= Karate India Organisation =

National governing body for karate in India

- Sport: Karate
- Jurisdiction: India
- Membership: State/UT associations
- Abbreviation: KIO
- Founded: 2020
- Affiliation: World Karate Federation
- Affiliation date: 15 November 2021
- Regional affiliation: Asian Karate Federation
- Affiliation date: 2021
- Headquarters: Delhi, India
- Location: Delhi, India
- President: Bharat Sharma
- Secretary: Sanjeev Kumar Jangra
- Replaced: Karate Association of India (KAI)

Official website
- www.karateindia.org
- (India)

The Karate India Organisation (KIO) replaced Karate Association of India (KAI) as the national governing body for karate in India on confirmation from World Karate Federation (WKF) on 15 November 2021.

KIO is incorporated as a non profitable company under section 8 of Companies Act, 2013 and established for the overall development of karate sport in India affiliated with World Karate Federation (WKF), Asian Karate Federation (AKF), and Commonwealth Karate Federation (CKF) from November 2021 to present.

Since 2019 there have been many disputes from the office bearers of the previous governing body (KAI), WKF de-recognition of Karate Association of India in accordance with the WKF Statutes and on 22 June 2020. Due to which the Sports Authority of India (SAI) and the Ministry of Youth Affairs and Sports, Government of India (MYAS) has de-recognized karate, and its governing federations are no more considered as National Sports Federation (NSF) under the Ministry of Youth Affairs and Sports, Government of India (MYAS) which is one of the major backlashes faced by karate in India since 2020.

On 15 November 2021, in Dubai at the 25th Senior World Karate Championship, the WKF Congress decided to permanently disaffiliate the Karate Association of India (KAI) from the WKF and give permanent affiliate recognition membership to KIO. WKF also notified to the Indian Olympic Association (IOA) and Ministry of Youth Affairs and Sports about the decision taken by the WKF Congress in Dubai, UAE, for the permanent affiliate KIO as the WKF member in India. Thus ratifying the earlier decision of the WKF Executive Committee (WKF EC), in accordance with the Olympic Charter Rule 28 to bring relief to the affected karate athletes of the whole country (India).

KAI was National Sports Federation for Karate Sports in India recognized by Government of India, Ministry of Youth Affairs and Sports until 2020 and was affiliated with WKF, AKF, SAKF and CKF from September 2013 to September 2020.

KIO now is only association or federation to select the athletes to represent country at Asian Games, World Karate Championships, Asian Karate Championships, Commonwealth Karate Championships, South Asian Karate Championship, World Youth Cup, Karate1 Youth League, Karate 1 Premier League, USA Open Karate Championship and other Good Will International Tournaments.

== Tournaments ==
=== National Karate Championship ===
- The National Championships are held annually for Senior, U-21, Junior, Cadet, and Sub-Junior categories. In addition, the All India Inter-Zone Championship is conducted, featuring top teams from East, North, West, South and Northeast Zones.
- KIO is the only sports body to promote karate across India at the school, college, university and corporate levels, not only as a martial art of self defense but also as a sport. Karate has been a medal event in Olympic, School Games, National Games, SAF Games & Asian Games, World Games, Youth Olympic, and karate has been recognised by the International Olympic Committee.

=== World Karate Championships ===
==== Senior World Karate Championship 2021 ====
- The India National Karate Team successfully participated in The 25th Senior World Karate Championship from 16 to 21 November 2021 in Dubai, United Arab Emirates, under the banner of KIO and captainship of Aniket Gupta.

==== Senior World Karate Championship 2023 ====
- The India National Karate Team successfully participated in The 26th Senior World Karate Championship from 24 to 29 October 2023 in Budapest, Hungary, under the banner of KIO and captainship of Aniket Gupta.

==== Junior World Karate Championship 2022 ====
- The India National Karate Team, under the banner of KIO, successfully participated in The 12th Cadet, Junior & U21 World Karate Championship 2022 from 26 to 30 October 2022 in Konya, Turkey.

=== Asian Karate Championships ===
==== Senior Asian Karate Championship 2021 ====
- The India National Karate Team, under the banner of KIO, successfully participated in The 2021 Asian Karate Championships held in Almaty, Kazakhstan, from 20 to 22, December 2021 and captainship of Aniket Gupta.

==== Senior Asian Karate Championship 2022 ====
- The India National Karate Team successfully participated in The 2022 Asian Karate Championships held in Tashkent, Uzbekistan, from 18 to 20, December 2022 under the banner of KIO and captainship of Aniket Gupta.

==== Senior Asian Karate Championship 2023 ====
- The India National Karate Team successfully participated in The 2023 Asian Karate Championships held in Malacca, Malaysia, from 21 to 23, July 2023 under the banner of KIO and captainship of Aniket Gupta.

== Affiliated associations ==
KIO has 36 state/province members all over India along with Services Sports Control Board (SSCB), Army, CRPF, Assam Rifles and many police forces as Corporate Members.

| State/Unit | Name of the affiliated Organisation |
|---|---|
| Karnataka | Akhil Karnataka Sports Karate Association |
| Nagaland | All Nagaland Karate Do Association |
| Jammu and Kashmir | Amateur Karate Do Association of Jammu and Kashmir |
| Arunachal Pradesh | Arunachal Pradesh Amateure Karate Association |
| Chandigarh | Chandigarh Karate Association |
| Chhattisgarh | Chhattisgarh Karate Association |
| Dadar and Nagar Haveli and Daman and Diu | DNH Sports & All Daman and Diu Karate Do Association |
| Haryana | Haryana United Karate Association |
| Delhi | Karate Association of Delhi |
| Himachal Pradesh | Karate Association of Himachal Pradesh |
| Uttar Pradesh | Karate Association of Uttar Pradesh |
| Maharashtra | Karate Do Association of Maharashtra |
| Gujarat | Karate Do Federation Gujarat |
| Kerala | Karate Kerala Association |
| West Bengal | Karate Do Association of Bengal |
| Manipur | Manipur Amateure Karate Do Association |
| Meghalaya | All Meghalaya Karate-Do Association |
| Madhyapradesh | Madhya Pradesh Sports Karate Association |
| Odisha | Odisha State Karate Do Association |
| Punjab | Punjab Karate Association |
| Rajasthan | Rajasthan Karate Association |
| Sikkim | Sikkim State Karate Do Association |
| Andaman Nicobar | Sports Karate Do Association Andaman and Nicobar Islands |
| Bihar | State Karate Association of Bihar |
| Tamilnadu | Tamil Nadu Sports Karate Do Association |
| Telangana | Telangana Sports Karate Do Association |
| Goa | Traditional Karate Association of Goa |
| Assam | Unified Karate Association of Assam |
| Tripura | United All Style Karate Tripura Association |
| Puducherry | Universal Karate Do Association of Puducherry |
| Uttarakhand | Uttarakhand Karate Association |

== KIO Presidents ==
| S.No. | Name | State | Tenure |
|---|---|---|---|
| 1. | Vijay Tiwari | Chhattisgarh | 2020 – 2024 |
| 2. | Bharat Sharma | Delhi | 2024 – present |

== KIO Secretaries General ==
| S.No. | Name | State | Tenure |
|---|---|---|---|
| 1. | Sanjeev Kumar Jangra | Uttrakhand | 2020 – present |

== KAI Presidents ==
| S.No. | Name | State | Tenure |
|---|---|---|---|
| 1. | Karate R. Thiagarajan Ex Deputy Mayor, | Tamil Nadu | 2013 to 2018 |
| 2. | Likha Tara | Arunachal Pradesh | 08.01.2020 to 26.10.2021 |
| 3. | Kuldeep Vats | Delhi | 26 November 2021 – present |

== KAI Secretaries General ==
| S.No. | Name | State | Tenure |
|---|---|---|---|
| 1. | Bharat Sharma | Delhi | 2013 – 2018 |
| 2. | Ambedkar Gupta | Jammu (Jammu and Kashmir) | 2019 – 2020 |
| 3. | Rajnesh Chaudhary | Haryana | 23 October 2020 – present |

== Athletes ==
The following is a list of athletes of the India National Karate Team who have represented India at international-level competitions such as Asian Games, World Karate Championships, Asian Karate Championships, Commonwealth Karate Championships, South Asian Karate Championship, Thailand open Karate Tournament, World Youth Cup, Karate 1 Premier League, USA Open Karate Championship, and other Good Will International Tournaments.

Athletes and results
| YEAR | NAME | STATE / UNIT | COMPETITION | VENUE | RANK / POSITION | EVENT |
|---|---|---|---|---|---|---|
| 2026 | Alisha Choudhary | Haryana | 2026 Asian Karate Championship | Bali, Indonesia | Gold | Individual Senior Female Kumite -55 kg |
| 2026 | Chetan Bhatt | Uttrakhand | Asian Games 2026 | Aichi-Nagoya, Japan | 5th | Individual male Kumite, -84 Kg |
| 2021 | Aniket Gupta | Delhi | Karate 1 Premier League | Istanbul Turkey | 25th | Individual Male Kata |
| 2020 | Deepika Dhiman | Delhi | Karate 1 Premier League | Santiago Chile | 9th | Female Kumite 55 kg |
| 2020 | Deepika Dhiman | Delhi | Karate 1 Premier League | Santiago Chile | 31st | Individual Female Kata |
| 2019 | Aniket Gupta | Delhi | 16th Senior Asian Karate Championship | Tashkent Uzbekistan | 15th | Individual Male Kata |
| 2019 | Pranay Sharma | Delhi | 16th Senior Asian Karate Championship | Tashkent Uzbekistan | 5th | Male Kumite 67 kg |
| 2019 | Priyanka Rami | Gujarat | 16th Senior Asian Karate Championship | Tashkent Uzbekistan | 13th | Individual Female Kata |
| 2019 | Deepika Dhiman | Delhi | 16th Senior Asian Karate Championship | Tashkent Uzbekistan | 9th | Female Kumite 55 kg |
| 2019 | Preksha Mittal | Haryana | 16th Senior Asian Karate Championship | Tashkent Uzbekistan | 7th | Female Kumite Above 68 kg |
| 2019 | Bobby Sharma | Punjab | 18th AKF CADET, JUNIOR and U21 Asian Karate Championships | Kota Kinabalu Malaysia | Bronze | Junior Kumite 48 kg |
| 2019 | Durga Das | Madhya Pradesh | 18th AKF CADET, JUNIOR and U21 Asian Karate Championships | Kota Kinabalu Malaysia | Bronze | U21 Kumite 55 kg |
| 2018 | Jayendran Sharath Kumar | Karnataka | Asian Games 2018 | Jakarta Indonesia | Participate | Men's Kumite 75 kg |
| 2018 | Vishal | Haryana | Asian Games 2018 | Jakarta Indonesia | Participate | Men's Kumite 84 kg |
| 2018 | Shruti Sharma | Haryana | 17th AKF CADET, JUNIOR and U21 Asian Karate Championships | Okinawa Japan | Bronze | Cadet Kumite 47 kg |
| 2018 | Amritpal Kaur | Delhi | 17th AKF CADET, JUNIOR and U21 Asian Karate Championships | Okinawa Japan | Bronze | U21 Kumite 55 kg |
| 2018 | Ananya Anand | Bihar | 17th AKF CADET, JUNIOR and U21 Asian Karate Championships | Okinawa Japan | Bronze | U21 Kumite Above 68 kg |
| 2018 | Vishal | Haryana | 17th AKF CADET, JUNIOR and U21 Asian Karate Championships | Okinawa Japan | Bronze | U21 Kumite 84 kg |

== Captain ==
Aniket Gupta represented India National Team for international competitions such as, World Karate Championship, Asian Karate Championship, Commonwealth Karate Championship and many recognized international tournaments through National Sports Federation of Karate - NSF recognized by Government of India (Ministry of Sports & Youth Affairs) as Team Captain of Indian Karate Team (from 2011–2020).

| S.No. | Name | State | Tenure |
|---|---|---|---|
| 1. | Aniket Gupta | Delhi | 23 October 2011 – present |

== Coach ==
The following is a list of coaches of the India National Karate Team who represented India at international competitions, such as: Asian Games, World Karate Championships, Asian Karate Championships, Commonwealth Karate Championships, South Asian Karate Championship, World Youth Cup, Karate 1 Premier League, USA Open Karate Championship and other Good Will International Tournaments.

Coach of National Teams for International Events
| YEAR | NAME | STATE / UNIT | COMPETITION | VENUE | COACH |
|---|---|---|---|---|---|
| 2019 | Ratan Gambhir | Madhya Pradesh | 16th Senior Asian Karate Championship | Tashkent Uzbekistan | Head coach |
| 2019 | Sanjeev Kumar | Uttarakhand | 16th Senior Asian Karate Championship | Tashkent Uzbekistan | Coach |
| 2019 | Sawan Kumar | SSCB Karate Team | 16th Senior Asian Karate Championship | Tashkent Uzbekistan | Coach |
| 2019 | Bharat Yadav | Haryana | 16th Senior Asian Karate Championship | Tashkent Uzbekistan | Coach |
| 2019 | Pacha Nobin Jomoh | Arunachal Pradesh | 16th Senior Asian Karate Championship | Tashkent Uzbekistan | Coach |
| 2019 | Linza Fanny | Meghalaya | 16th Senior Asian Karate Championship | Tashkent Uzbekistan | Coach |
| 2018 | Jaidev Sharma | Madhya Pradesh | Asian Games 2018 | Jakarta Indonesia | Coach |
