= Karate in Bihar =

National competitions
- Karate India Organisation; School Games Federation of India; AIU Games

International competitions
- Asian Karate Championships; Karate World Championships; Karate1 Youth League; Karate1 Premier League; Commonwealth Karate Championships

Karate in the Indian state of Bihar is overseen by the State Karate Association of Bihar which is affiliated to the Karate India Organisation and recognized by the Bihar Olympic Association.

Karate has been growing in popularity across Bihar, particularly among the youth, and is practised both for self-defence and as a competitive sport.

== Notable athletes ==
- Md Zabir Ansari

== See also ==
- Karate in India
- Karate India Organisation
