= Kübra Dağlı =

Turkish taekwondo practitioner

Personal information
- National team: TUR
- Born: 17 February 1996 (age 30) Isparta, Turkey
- Years active: 2009-

Sport
- Sport: Taekwondo
- Event(s): Recognized Poomsae; Freestyle Poomsae
Medal record
Representing Turkey
World Championships
Poomsae
Gold medal – first place	Rhodes 2018	f under 30
Bronze medal – third place	Rhodes 2017	Pair under 30
Freestyle
Gold medal – first place	Lima 2016	Pair over 17
Silver medal – second place	Aguascalientes 2014	Team over 17
Bronze medal – third place	Rhodes 2017	f over 17
Bronze medal – third place	Rhodes 2017	Pair over 17
Bronze medal – third place	Rhodes 2018	f over 17
European Championships
Poomsae
Bronze medal – third place	Rhodes 2017	f under 30
Freestyle
Gold medal – first place	Belgrade 2015	Pair over 18
Gold medal – first place	Rhodes 2017	Pair over 17
Gold medal – first place	Rhodes 2018	High Kick
Gold medal – first place	Portugal 2021	Pair over 17
Silver medal – second place	Belgrade 2015	f over 18
Bronze medal – third place	Rhodes 2017	f over 17
- Updated on 26 August 2023

Kübra Dağlı (born 17 February 1996) is a Turkish Taekwondo athlete, social media influencer and two-time world champion.

Dağlı, alongside her partner Emirhan Muran, won a gold medal in the senior competition at the 10th World Poomsae Championships held in Peru in 2016. In 2018, she won her second gold medal on the world stage by claiming first place in the women's Recognized Poomsae competition at the 2nd World Taekwondo Beach Championships held in Rhodes.

Following her world title in 2016, she received extensive media coverage, particularly for her competing in Taekwondo while wearing a headscarf. She wrote on social media: "They don't speak of my success, but of my headscarf. I don’t want this. Our success should be discussed." Milliyet newspaper columnist Asu Maro documented the two sources of criticism Dağlı faced – Muslims who saw Taekwondo itself as improper for women, and secular organizations who wanted her to remove her head covering during competitions. She condemned both groups as holding "sexist ideologies" that are harmful to her and other Muslim female athletes.

Headscarves are permitted by Taekwondo's international governing bodies, though Dağlı said she did have to wear a bandana instead of a hijab once, in 2013.

Her mother and her father, a boxing coach, have been supportive of her athleticism. After trying Karate, she switched to Taekwondo at the age of 13. At first, she was trained by her uncle, a Taekwondo coach. She has been training with her partner Emirhan Muran since 2014.

Over the years, Dağlı has been World champion twice and European champion four times. As of 2023, she is a seven-time European and seven-time World medalist.

She won her latest medal at the 15th Taekwondo European Poomsae Championships in Portugal in 2021, where she and Emirhan Muran claimed the gold medal in the Pair's Freestyle Poomsae competition.
