= Md Zabir Ansari =

Indian karate player (born 1997)

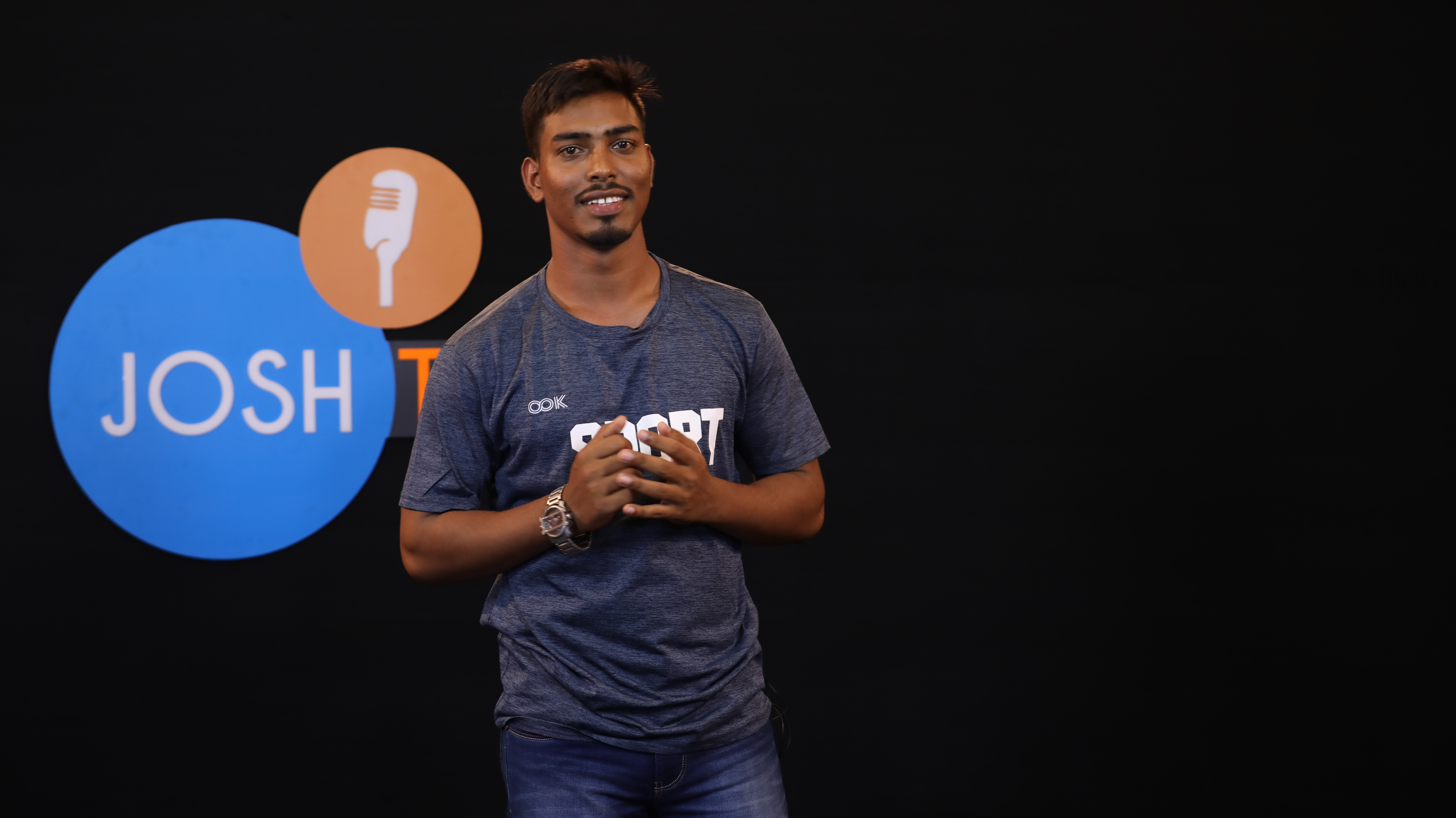

Personal information
- Full name: Mohammad Zabir Ansari
- National team: Karate India Organisation
- Born: February 1, 1997 (age 29) Tumba Pahad, Jamui district, Bihar
- Education: Bachelor of Arts at Patna University
- Years active: 2016-present
- Weight: 75 kg (165 lb; 11 st 11 lb)

Sport
- Country: India
- Sport: Karate
- Rank: 545 by World Karate Federation

Md Zabir Ansari (born 1 February 1997; Hindi: मोहम्मद ज़ाबिर अंसारी) is an Indian Karate player. He represents India in various Karate tournaments, across the globe. He secured a Gold in the National Karate Championship held at Kurukshetra University in 2025. He also won a bronze medal in 2022 and a gold medal in 2023 in the National Karate Competition organized by the Association of Indian Universities.

== Early life and background ==
Zabir was born into a Ansari family of Mohammad Imtiyaz Ansari, a government schoolteacher and Fahima Khatoon, a Beedi maker at Tumba Pahad village of Jhajha in Jamui district, Bihar.

He completed his graduation in Bachelor of Arts (Urdu) from Patna University and pursuing Master of Arts (Urdu) from Patna University.

== Career ==
Ansari was selected as the coach for the students of Patna University in the North East Zone Inter-University Karate Championship held at Chandigarh University in December 2024. Anurag Paswan, a student from Ansari's private classes, won a medal in the tournament.

In February 2025, Ansari launched a free admission campaign for female karate practitioners across Bihar at the Institute of Dynamic Martial Arts, a Karate Training centre he runs.

In August 2025, Ansari made a debut in acting with a role in Rangdar Ahir album with Tiger Yadav, a YouTuber from Bihar. Ansari also played a role as an Action Director.

== Achievements ==
He clinched the silver medal at the South Asia Karate Championship in Sri Lanka back in 2017. He showcased his skills at the Open Karate Championship in Thailand in 2018. He has actively taken part in numerous national and international karate tournaments. Bihar government has recognized his talent by bestowing him with sports accolades in 2018, 2021, 2022 and 2023.

He has achieved first place in the State Level Karate Championship for six consecutive years, in addition to earning silver and bronze medals in 2017 and 2019. In the previous year, He placed third in the All India Inter University Karate Championship. He secured fourth place in the Khelo India University Games 2022.

In June 2024, Ansari secured a gold medal at the International Karate Championship held in Kakarvitta Meshinagar Jhapa, Nepal. He was honored by Gopal Tamang, a local politician.

In August 2025, Ansari clinched the National-level gold medal at the Karate Championship 2025 held at Kurukshetra University, Haryana.

Zabir has also played in the championship in China in 2018, Turkey in 2019 and Egypt in 2022.

== Awards and Honours ==
- Champaran Satyagraha Award 2017
- Rashtriya Khel Ratna Samman 2018 by Government of Bihar
- Rashtriya Khel Ratna Samman 2021 by Government of Bihar
- Rashtriya Khel Ratna Samman 2022 by Government of Bihar
- Mahatma Gandhi Award 2022
- Mahatma Buddha Award 2022
- Bihar Social Pride Award 2022
- Rashtriya Khel Ratna Samman 2023 by Government of Bihar
- Shah Azimabad Khel Ratna 2023
- Bihar Pratibha Samman 2024
- Bihar Vaibhav Samman 2024.
- Rani Lakshmi Bai Khel Ratn Samman 2025

Ansari was featured in The Changemakers of Bihar by Awaz The Voice in 2025.
