= Pacha Nobin Jomoh =

Sportsman and police DySP of arunachal pradesh

Pacha Nobin Jomoh (born 1 November 1990) is an Indian karate player who hails from the state of Arunachal Pradesh

Jomoh is currently serving the Arunachal Pradesh Police as DySP and also designated as the Secretary of Athlete Commission Karate Association of India KAI (National Sports Federation)

Jomoh (Black Belt 5 Dan), a four-time Commonwealth Karate Championship medal winner, has so far won five gold medals in various international karate events.

He is the first from the Northeast to win a karate medal in the Commonwealth Karate Championships, and the first karateka from Arunachal Pradesh to participate in the World Karate Championship conducted by the World Karate Federation WKF.
