= 2019 in combat sports =

== Boxing ==
=== Amateur boxing ===
- March 8 – 17: 2019 EUBC Under 22 Men & Women European Boxing Championships in Vladikavkaz
  - Russia won both the gold and overall medal tallies.
- April 17 – 28: 2019 Asian Amateur Boxing Championships in (Thailand) Bangkok
  - China won the gold medal tally. India won the overall medal tally.
- June 21 – 30: 2019 European Amateur Boxing Championships in (Belarus) Minsk (in conjunction with the 2019 European Games)
  - Ukraine and Armenia won 2 gold medals each. Great Britain won the overall medal tally.
- September 7 – 21: 2019 AIBA World Boxing Championships in Yekaterinburg
  - Uzbekistan and Russia won 3 gold medals each. Kazakhstan won the overall medal tally.
- September 2 – 11: 2019 EUBC Youth Men & Women European Boxing Championships in (Bulgaria) Sofia
  - Russia won both the gold and overall medal tallies.
- October 3 – 13: 2019 AIBA Women's World Boxing Championships in Ulan-Ude
  - Russia won both the gold and overall medal tallies.

=== Professional boxing ===
Date	Location	Winner	Loser	Weight	Titles	Report
January 13	Los Angeles, United States	Caleb Plant	José Uzcátegui	Super middleweight	IBF	
January 18	New York, United States	Demetrius Andrade	Artur Akavov	Middleweight	WBO	
January 26	New York, United States	Keith Thurman	Josesito López	Welterweight	WBA (Super)	
February 2	Frisco, United States	Sergey Kovalev	Eleider Álvarez	Light heavyweight	WBO	
February 9	Verona, United States	Dmitry Bivol	Joe Smith Jr.	Light heavyweight	WBA	
February 10	Fresno, United States	José Ramírez	Jose Zepeda	Light welterweight	WBC	
February 23	Minneapolis, United States	Anthony Dirrell	Avni Yıldırım	Super middleweight	WBC	
March 9	Carson, United States	Shawn Porter	Yordenis Ugás	Welterweight	WBC	
March 16	Arlington, United States	Errol Spence Jr.	Mikey Garcia	Welterweight	IBF	
March 30	Philadelphia, United States	Oleksandr Gvozdyk	Doudou Ngumbu	Light heavyweight	WBC	
April 2	New York, United States	Terence Crawford	Amir Khan	Welterweight	WBO	
April 12	Los Angeles, United States	Vasyl Lomachenko	Anthony Crolla	Lightweight	WBA (Super), WBO	
April 12	Los Angeles, United States	Gilberto Ramírez	Tommy Karpency	Light heavyweight		
April 13	Monterrey, Mexico	Jaime Munguia	Dennis Hogan	Light middleweight	WBO	
May 4	Stockton, United States	Artur Beterbiev	Radivoje Kalajdzic	Light heavyweight	IBF	
May 4	Las Vegas, United States	Saúl Álvarez	Daniel Jacobs	Middleweight	WBA (Super), WBC, IBF	
May 11	Fairfax, United States	Julian Williams	Jarrett Hurd	Light middleweight	WBA (Super), IBF, IBO	
May 18	Stevenage, United Kingdom	Billy Joe Saunders	Shefat Isufi	Super middleweight	WBO	
May 18	Glasgow, United Kingdom	Josh Taylor	Ivan Baranchyk	Light welterweight	IBF	Report
May 18	New York, United States	Deontay Wilder	Dominic Breazeale	Heavyweight	WBC	
June 1	New York, United States	Callum Smith	Hassan N'Dam	Super middleweight	WBA	Report
June 1	New York, United States	Andy Ruiz Jr.	Anthony Joshua	Heavyweight	WBA (Super), IBF, WBO, IBO	Report
June 8	New York, United States	Gennady Golovkin	Steve Rolls	Middleweight		
June 15	Leeds, United Kingdom	Josh Warrington	Kid Galahad	Featherweight	IBF	
June 15	Las Vegas, United States	Tyson Fury	Tom Schwarz	Heavyweight		
July 20	London, United Kingdom	Dillian Whyte	Oscar Rivas	Heavyweight		Report
July 20	Las Vegas, United States	Manny Pacquiao	Keith Thurman	Welterweight	WBA (Super)	Report
August 24	Chelyabinsk, Russia	Sergey Kovalev	Anthony Yarde	Light heavyweight	WBO	
August 31	London, United Kingdom	Vasyl Lomachenko	Luke Campbell	Lightweight	WBA (Super), WBC, WBO	
September 14	Las Vegas, United States	Tyson Fury	Otto Wallin	Heavyweight		
September 28	Los Angeles, United States	Errol Spence Jr.	Shawn Porter	Welterweight	WBC, IBF	Report
October 18	Philadelphia, United States	Artur Beterbiev	Oleksandr Gvozdyk	Light heavyweight	WBC, IBF	
October 26	London, United Kingdom	Josh Taylor	Regis Prograis	Light welterweight	WBA (Super), IBF	Report
November 2	Las Vegas, United States	Saúl Álvarez	Sergey Kovalev	Light heavyweight	WBO	
November 23	Las Vegas, United States	Deontay Wilder	Luis Ortiz	Heavyweight	WBC	Report
December 7	Diriyah, Saudi Arabia	Anthony Joshua	Andy Ruiz Jr.	Heavyweight	WBA (Super), IBF, WBO, IBO	Report
December 14	New York, United States	Terence Crawford	Egidijus Kavaliauskas	Welterweight	WBO	

==== World Boxing Super Series tournaments ====
- October 7, 2018 – October 26, 2019: Super lightweight division Winner: (United Kingdom) Josh Taylor
- October 7, 2018 – November 7, 2019: bantamweight division Winner: (Japan) Naoya Inoue
- October 13, 2018 – December 14, 2019: cruiserweight division Winner:

== Fencing ==
=== World fencing events ===
- April 6 – 14: 2019 World Junior and Cadet Fencing Championships in (Poland) Toruń
  - Junior Individual Épée winners: (France) Arthur Philippe (m) / (Italy) Federica Isola (f)
  - Junior Team Épée winners: Hungary (m) / France (f)
  - Junior Individual Foil winners: (Russia) Kirill Borodachev (m) / (United States) Lauren Scruggs (f)
  - Junior Team Foil winners: Russia (m) / Russia (f)
  - Junior Individual Sabre winners: (Italy) Lorenzo Roma (m) / (Russia) Alina Mikhailova (f)
  - Junior Team Sabre winners: Italy (m) / Hungary (f)
  - Cadet Individual Épée winners: (Italy) Enrico Piatti (m) / (Hungary) Eszter Muhari (f)
  - Cadet Individual Foil winners: (Russia) Egor Barannikov (m) / (United States) Lauren Scruggs (f)
  - Cadet Individual Sabre winners: (Ukraine) Vasyl Humen (m) / (Hungary) Luca Szucs (f)
- July 15 – 23: 2019 World Fencing Championships in (Hungary) Budapest
  - Individual Épée winners: (Hungary) Gergely Siklósi (m) / (Brazil) Nathalie Moellhausen (f)
  - Team Épée winners: France (m) / China (f)
  - Individual Foil winners: (France) Enzo Lefort (m) / (Russia) Inna Deriglazova (f)
  - Team Foil winners: United States (m) / Russia (f)
  - Individual Sabre winners: (South Korea) Oh Sang-uk (m) / (Ukraine) Olha Kharlan (f)
  - Team Sabre winners: South Korea (m) / Russia (f)

=== Continental fencing events ===
- February 20 – 22: 2019 African Junior Fencing Championships in Algiers
  - Junior Individual Épée winners: (Egypt) Ibrahim Ramadan (m) / (Algeria) Yousra Zeboudj (f)
  - Junior Team Épée winners: Egypt (m) / Algeria (f)
  - Junior Individual Foil winners: (Egypt) Mohamed Hamza (m) / (Egypt) Noha Hany (f)
  - Junior Team Foil winners: Egypt (m) / Egypt (f)
  - Junior Individual Sabre winners: (Egypt) Medhat Moataz (m) / (Egypt) Mariam M.Ahmed (f)
  - Junior Team Sabre winners: Egypt (m) / Egypt (f)
- February 26 – March 3: 2019 Pan American Junior Fencing Championships in (Colombia) Bogotá
  - Junior Individual Épée winners: (Canada) Theodore (Ted) Vinnitchouk (m) / (United States) Greta Candreva (f)
  - Junior Team Épée winners: United States (m) / United States (f)
  - Junior Individual Foil winners: (United States) Kenji Bravo (m) / (Canada) Jessica Zi Jia GUO (f)
  - Junior Team Foil winners: United States (m) / United States (f)
  - Junior Individual Sabre winners: (United States) Kamar Skeete (m) / (Mexico) Natalia Botello (f)
  - Junior Team Sabre winners: United States (m) / Mexico (f)
- February 27 – March 3: 2019 European Junior Fencing Championships in Foggia
  - Junior Individual Épée winners: (Hungary) Mate Tamas Koch (m) / (Italy) Federica Isola (f)
  - Junior Team Épée winners: Poland (m) / Russia (f)
  - Junior Individual Foil winners: (Italy) Tommaso Marini (m) / (Italy) Serena Rossini (f)
  - Junior Team Foil winners: Russia (m) / Italy (f)
  - Junior Individual Sabre winners: (Italy) Matteo Neri (m) / (Hungary) Liza Pusztai (f)
  - Junior Team Sabre winners: France (m) / Germany (f)
- March 3 – 8: 2019 Asian Junior Fencing Championships in (Jordan) Amman
  - Junior Individual Épée winners: (South Korea) JANG Min-hyeok (m) / (China) SHI Yuexin (f)
  - Junior Team Épée winners: China (m) / South Korea (f)
  - Junior Individual Foil winners: (Japan) Kyota Kawamura (m) / (Singapore) Amita Berthier (f)
  - Junior Team Foil winners: Japan (m) / Singapore (f)
  - Junior Individual Sabre winners: (South Korea) SUNG Hyeon-mo (m) / (South Korea) JEON Su-in (f)
  - Junior Team Sabre winners: South Korea (m) / South Korea (f)
- June 13 – 18: 2019 Asian Fencing Championships in Tokyo
  - Individual Épée winners: (Japan) Masaru Yamada (m) / (China) ZHU Mingye (f)
  - Team Épée winners: China (m) / South Korea (f)
  - Individual Foil winners: (Japan) Takahiro Shikine (m) / (South Korea) Jeon Hee-sook (f)
  - Team Foil winners: Japan (m) / Japan (f)
  - Individual Sabre winners: (South Korea) Oh Sang-uk (m) / (South Korea) Yoon Ji-su (f)
  - Team Sabre winners: South Korea (m) / China (f)
- June 17 – 22: 2019 European Fencing Championships in Düsseldorf
  - Individual Épée winners: (Israel) Yuval Freilich (m) / (France) Coraline Vitalis (f)
  - Team Épée winners: Russia (m) / Poland (f)
  - Individual Foil winners: (Italy) Alessio Foconi (m) / (Italy) Elisa Di Francisca (f)
  - Team Foil winners: France (m) / Russia (f)
  - Individual Sabre winners: (Russia) Veniamin Reshetnikov (m) / (Ukraine) Olha Kharlan (f)
  - Team Sabre winners: Germany (m) / Russia (f)
- June 24 – 28: 2019 African Fencing Championships in (Mali) Bamako
  - Individual Épée winners: (Morocco) Houssam Elkord (m) / (Tunisia) Sarra Besbes (f)
  - Team Épée winners: Morocco (m) / Egypt (f)
  - Individual Foil winners: (Egypt) Alaaeldin Abouelkassem (m) / (Tunisia) Inès Boubakri (f)
  - Team Foil winners: Egypt (m) / Tunisia (f)
  - Individual Sabre winners: (Egypt) Mohamed Amer (m) / (Tunisia) Amira Ben Chaabane (f)
  - Team Sabre winners: Egypt (m) / Tunisia (f)
- June 27 – July 2: 2019 Pan American Fencing Championships in (Canada) Toronto
  - Individual Épée winners: (Venezuela) Rubén Limardo (m) / (United States) Kelley Hurley (f)
  - Team Épée winners: Cuba (m) / United States (f)
  - Individual Foil winners: (United States) Race Imboden (m) / (United States) Nicole Ross (f)
  - Team Foil winners: United States (m) / United States (f)
  - Individual Sabre winners: (United States) Eli Dershwitz (m) / (United States) Anne-Elizabeth Stone (f)
  - Team Sabre winners: United States (m) / United States (f)

=== 2018–19 Fencing Grand Prix ===
- Épée Grand Prix
  - January 25 – 27: Qatari Grand Prix in (Qatar) Doha
    - Winners: (France) Yannick Borel (m) / (Estonia) Julia Beljajeva (f)
  - March 8 – 10: Hungarian Grand Prix in (Hungary) Budapest
    - Winners: (Japan) Kazuyasu Minobe (m) / (Romania) Ana Maria Popescu (f)
  - May 3 – 5: Colombian Grand Prix (final) in (Colombia) Cali
    - Winners: (Japan) Kazuyasu Minobe (m) / (China) Sun Yiwen (f)
- Foil Grand Prix
  - February 8 – 10: Italian Grand Prix in (Italy) Turin
    - Winners: (United States) Race Imboden (m) / (Italy) Alice Volpi (f)
  - March 15 – 17: American Grand Prix in (United States) Anaheim
    - Winners: (France) Julien Mertine (m) / (Russia) Inna Deriglazova (f)
  - May 17 – 19: Chinese Grand Prix (final) in (China) Shanghai
    - Winners: (Italy) Alessio Foconi (m) / (Russia) Inna Deriglazova (f)
- Sabre Grand Prix
  - February 22 – 24: Egyptian Grand Prix in (Egypt) Cairo
    - Winners: (South Korea) Oh Sang-uk (m) / (Russia) Sofya Velikaya (f)
  - April 26 – 28: Korean Grand Prix in (South Korea) Seoul
    - Winners: (South Korea) Oh Sang-uk (m) / (Ukraine) Olha Kharlan (f)
  - May 24 – 26: Russian Grand Prix (final) in (Russia) Moscow
    - Winners: (France) Boladé Apithy (m) / (Russia) Sofya Velikaya (f)

=== 2018–19 Fencing World Cup ===
- Men's Épée World Cup
  - November 23 – 25, 2018: Swiss World Cup in (Switzerland) Bern
    - Individual: (Japan) Kazuyasu Minobe
    - Team: Russia
  - January 11 – 13: German Épée World Cup in (Germany) Heidenheim
    - Individual: (France) Alexandre Bardenet
    - Team: Russia
  - February 8 – 10: Canadian World Cup in (Canada) Vancouver
    - Individual: (Japan) Koki Kano
    - Team: Russia
  - March 22 – 24: Argentinian World Cup in (Argentina) Buenos Aires
    - Individual: (Russia) Sergey Bida
    - Team: Japan
  - May 17 – 19: French Épée World Cup (final) in (France) Paris
    - Individual: (South Korea) Park Sang-young
    - Team: Switzerland
- Women's Épée World Cup
  - November 9 – 11, 2018: Estonian World Cup in (Estonia) Tallinn
    - Individual: (South Korea) Jung Hyo-jung
    - Team: Russia
  - January 11 – 13: Cuban World Cup in (Cuba) Havana
    - Individual: (Hong Kong) Vivian Kong
    - Team: Estonia
  - February 8 – 10: Spanish Épée World Cup in (Spain) Barcelona
    - Individual: (Hong Kong) Vivian Kong
    - Team: Poland
  - March 22 – 24: Chinese World Cup in (China) Chengdu
    - Individual: (France) Helene Ngom
    - Team: Germany
  - May 17 – 19: Emirati World Cup (final) in (United Arab Emirates) Dubai
    - Individual: (South Korea) Choi In-jeong
    - Team: Poland
- Men's Foil World Cup
  - November 9 – 11, 2018: German Men's Foil World Cup in (Germany) Bonn
    - Individual: (United Kingdom) Richard Kruse
    - Team: United States
  - January 11 – 13: French Men's Foil World Cup in (France) Paris
    - Individual: (Italy) Alessio Foconi
    - Team: Russia
  - January 25 – 27: Japanese World Cup in (Japan) Tokyo
    - Individual: (United Kingdom) Richard Kruse
    - Team: Italy
  - March 1 – 3: Egyptian Men's Foil World Cup in (Egypt) Cairo
    - Individual: (Italy) Daniele Garozzo
    - Team: United States
  - May 3 – 5: Russian World Cup (final) in (Russia) Saint Petersburg
    - Individual: (Italy) Andrea Cassarà
    - Team: United States
- Women's Foil World Cup
  - November 23 – 25, 2018: Algerian Foil World Cup in (Algeria) Algiers
    - Individual: (Italy) Elisa Di Francisca
    - Team: France
  - January 11 – 13: Polish Foil World Cup in (Poland) Katowice
    - Individual: (Russia) Inna Deriglazova
    - Team: France
  - January 25 – 27: French Women's Foil World Cup in Saint-Maur
    - Individual: (Russia) Inna Deriglazova
    - Team: France
  - March 1 – 3: Egyptian Women's Foil World Cup in (Egypt) Cairo
    - Individual: (Russia) Inna Deriglazova
    - Team: Italy
  - May 3 – 5: German Women's Foil World Cup (final) in (Germany) Tauberbischofsheim
    - Individual: (Russia) Inna Deriglazova
    - Team: Russia
- Men's Sabre World Cup
  - November 16 – 18, 2018: Algerian Sabre World Cup in (Algeria) Algiers
    - Individual: (South Korea) HA Han-sol
    - Team: South Korea
  - February 1 – 3: Polish Sabre World Cup in (Poland) Warsaw
    - Individual: (United States) Eli Dershwitz
    - Team: Italy
  - March 8 – 10: Italian World Cup in (Italy) Padoue
    - Individual: (Italy) Luca Curatoli
    - Team: South Korea
  - March 22 – 24: Hungarian World Cup in (Hungary) Budapest
    - Individual: (Germany) Max Hartung
    - Team: South Korea
  - May 10 – 12: Spanish Sabre World Cup (final) in (Spain) Madrid
    - Individual: (Germany) Max Hartung
    - Team: Italy
- Women's Sabre World Cup
  - November 9 – 11, 2018: French Sabre World Cup in Orléans
    - Individual: (Hungary) Anna Márton
    - Team: France
  - January 25 – 27: American World Cup in (United States) Salt Lake City
    - Individual: (France) Cécilia Berder
    - Team: France
  - March 8 – 10: Greek World Cup in (Greece) Athens
    - Individual: (Russia) Sofia Pozdniakova
    - Team: France
  - March 22 – 24: Belgian World Cup in (Belgium) Sint-Niklaas
    - Individual: (France) Manon Brunet
    - Team: France
  - May 10 – 12: Tunisian World Cup (final) in (Tunisia) Tunis
    - Individual: (Russia) Sofya Velikaya
    - Team: Italy

== Judo ==
=== World and continental judo events ===
- April 20 – 23: 2019 Asian-Pacific Judo Championships in (United Arab Emirates) Fujairah
  - Japan won the gold medal tally. South Korea won the overall medal tally.
- April 25 – 28: 2019 African Judo Championships in (South Africa) Cape Town
  - Algeria and Tunisia won 4 gold medals each. Algeria won the overall medal tally.
- April 25 – 28: 2019 Pan American Judo Championships in Lima
  - Individual: Brazil and Canada won 4 gold medals each. Brazil won the overall medal tally.
  - Team Champions: Brazil; Second: Cuba; Third: Peru
- June 22 – 25: 2019 European Judo Championships in (Belarus) Minsk (in conjunction with the 2019 European Games)
  - Russia won 3 gold medals and 8 overall medals.
- August 25 – September 1: 2019 World Judo Championships in Tokyo
  - Japan won both the gold and overall medal tallies.
- September 25 – 28: 2019 World Cadet Judo Championships in (Kazakhstan) Almaty
  - Japan won both the gold and overall medal tallies.
- October 10 – 13: 2019 World Veterans Judo Championships in (Morocco) Marrakesh
  - France won both the gold and overall medal tallies.
- October 16 – 19: 2019 World Junior Judo Championships in (Morocco) Marrakesh
  - Japan won both the gold and overall medal tallies.
- November 1 – 3: 2019 European U23 Judo Championships in Izhevsk
  - Russia won both the gold and overall medal tallies.
- December 14 & 15: 2019 Judo World Masters Championship in (China) Guangzhou

=== 2019 Judo Grand Slam ===
- February 9 & 10: JGS #1 in (France) Paris
  - Japan won both the gold and overall medal tallies.
- February 22 – 24: JGS #2 in (Germany) Düsseldorf
  - Japan won both the gold and overall medal tallies.
- March 15 – 17: JGS #3 in Yekaterinburg
  - Russia won both the gold and overall medal tallies.
- May 10 – 12: JGS #4 in Baku
  - Japan and Brazil won 2 gold medals each. Azerbaijan won the overall medal tally.
- October 6 – 8: JGS #5 in Brasília
  - Brazil won both the gold and overall medal tallies.
- October 24 – 26: JGS #6 in (United Arab Emirates) Abu Dhabi
  - South Korea won both the gold and overall medal tallies.
- November 22 – 24: JGS #7 (final) in (Japan) Osaka

=== 2019 Judo Grand Prix ===
- January 24 – 26: JUGP #1 in Tel Aviv
  - Israel won both the gold and overall medal tallies.
- March 8 – 10: JUGP #2 in (Morocco) Marrakesh
  - Germany, Uzbekistan, and France won 2 gold medals each. Germany won the overall medal tally.
- March 29 – 31: JUGP #3 in (Georgia (country)) Tbilisi
  - France won the gold medal tally. Georgia won the overall medal tally.
- April 5 – 7: JUGP #4 in (Turkey) Antalya
  - 14 national teams won 1 gold medal each. Georgia won the overall medal tally.
- May 24 – 26: JUGP #5 in (China) Hohhot
  - South Korea won the gold medal tally. Germany won the overall medal tally.
- July 5 – 7: JUGP #6 in Montreal
  - Japan won the gold medal tally. Japan and Canada won 9 overall medals each.
- July 12 – 14: JUGP #7 in (Hungary) Budapest
  - Japan won both the gold and overall medal tallies.
- July 26 – 28: JUGP #8 in (Croatia) Zagreb
  - Japan won both the gold and overall medal tallies.
- September 20 – 22: JUGP #9 (final) in Tashkent
  - Russia won the gold medal tally. Russia and Uzbekistan won 7 overall medals each.

=== 2019 Asian Open ===
- July 18 & 19: AJO #1 in (Kazakhstan) Aktau
  - Russia won both the gold and overall medal tallies.
- August 3 & 4: AJO #2 in (Chinese Taipei) Taipei
  - South Korea and Japan won 6 gold medals each. South Korea won the overall medal tally.
- November 30 & December 1: AJO #3 (final) in Hong Kong

=== 2019 European Open ===
- February 2 & 3: European Open #1 in (Portugal) Odivelas (M) & (Bulgaria) Sofia (W)
  - Men: France and Japan won 3 gold medals each. France won the overall medal tally.
  - Women: France won both the gold and overall medal tallies.
- February 16 & 17: European Open #2 in Rome (M) & Oberwart (W)
  - Men: Russia won the gold medal tally. Italy won the overall medal tally.
  - Women: Austria and Mongolia won 2 gold medals each. China and Brazil won 6 overall medals each.
- March 2 & 3: European Open #3 in (Poland) Warsaw (M) & (Czech Republic) Prague (W)
  - Men: France won both the gold and overall medal tallies.
  - Women: China won both the gold and overall medal tallies.
- June 1 & 2: European Open #4 in (Romania) Cluj-Napoca
  - Italy and Georgia won 4 gold medals each. Italy and France won 7 overall medals each.
- September 28 & 29: European Open #5 in Luxembourg City
  - France won both the gold and overall medal tallies.
- October 12 & 13: European Open #6 (final) in (Estonia) Tallinn
  - France won both the gold and overall medal tallies.

=== 2019 European Cup ===
- March 9 & 10: European Cup #1 in (Switzerland) Uster-Zürich
  - Georgia won the gold medal tally. France won the overall medal tally.
- April 13 & 14: European Cup #2 in (Croatia) Dubrovnik
  - France and Ukraine won 3 gold medals each. Ukraine and the Netherlands won 9 overall medals each.
- May 4 & 5: European Cup #3 in (Bosnia and Herzegovina) Sarajevo
  - Hungary and Montenegro won 3 gold medals each. Hungary, Germany, and Croatia won 6 overall medals each.
- May 18 & 19: European Cup #4 in Orenburg
  - Russia won both the gold and overall medal tallies.
- May 25 & 26: European Cup #5 in (Slovenia) Celje-Podčetrtek
  - Netherlands, Hungary, and Great Britain won 3 gold medals each. Germany won the overall medal tally.
- September 7 & 8: European Cup #6 in (Slovakia) Bratislava
  - Germany won the gold medal tally. Germany and Poland won 9 overall medals each.
- October 19 & 20: European Cup #7 (final) in Málaga
  - Russia won the gold medal tally. France and Spain won 12 overall medals each.

=== 2019 Pan American Open ===
- March 9 & 10: PAJO #1 in Lima
  - 5 different national teams won 2 gold medals each. Argentina and Peru won 9 overall medals each.
- March 16 & 17: PAJO #2 in (Argentina) Córdoba
  - 4 different national teams won 2 gold medals each. Mexico won the overall medal tally.
- March 23 & 24: PAJO #3 in (Chile) Santiago
  - Brazil won the gold medal tally. France won the overall medal tally.
- June 15 & 16: PAJO #4 in Quito
  - Cuba won the gold medal tally. Ecuador won the overall medal tally.
- September 7 & 8: PAJO #5 (final) in Santo Domingo
  - The Dominican Republic won both the gold and overall medal tallies.

=== 2019 African Open ===
- November 9 & 10: AfJO #1 in Yaoundé
  - Cameroon won both the gold and overall medal tallies.
- November 16 & 17: AfJO #2 (final) in (Senegal) Dakar

=== 2019 Oceania Open ===
- November 3 & 4: OJO #1 (only) in (Australia) Perth
  - Russia won the gold medal tally. Germany won the overall medal tally.

== Karate ==
=== International & Continental karate events ===
- February 8 – 10: 2019 EKF Junior, Cadet & U21 Championships in (Denmark) Aalborg
  - Turkey won both the gold and overall medal tallies.
- March 18 – 23: 2019 PKF Championships in Panama City
  - The United States won both the gold and overall medal tallies.
- March 28 – 31: 2019 EKF Championships in Guadalajara
  - Spain won the gold medal tally. Turkey won the overall medal tally.
- April 6 & 7: 2019 EKF Mediterranean Championships in Antalya
  - Turkey won both the gold and overall medal tallies.
- April 11 & 12: 2019 OKF Championships in Sydney
  - Australia won both the gold and overall medal tallies.
- April 26 – 28: 2019 AKF Junior, Cadet & U21 Championships in (Malaysia) Kota Kinabalu
  - Japan won both the gold and overall medal tallies.
- July 9 – 15: 2019 UFAK Junior & Senior Championships in (Botswana) Gaborone
  - Egypt and Morocco won 11 gold medals each. Egypt won the overall medal tally.
- July 15 – 21: 2019 AKF Championships in (Uzbekistan) Tashkent
  - Japan won both the gold and overall medal tallies.
- August 26 – September 1: 2019 PKF Junior, Cadet & U21 Championships in (Ecuador) Guayaquil
  - Brazil won both the gold and overall medal tallies.
- October 23 – 27: 2019 WKF Junior, Cadet & U21 Championships in (Chile) Santiago
  - Egypt won both the gold and overall medal tallies.

=== 2019 Karate 1: Premier League ===
- January 25 – 27: K1PL #1 in (France) Paris
  - Japan won both the gold and overall medal tallies.
- February 15 – 17: K1PL #2 in (United Arab Emirates) Dubai
  - France and Turkey won 3 gold medals each. Iran won the overall medal tally.
- April 19 – 21: K1PL #3 in (Morocco) Rabat
  - Turkey and Ukraine won 3 gold medals each. Turkey won the overall medal tally.
- June 7 – 9: K1PL #4 in (China) Shanghai
  - Japan, Turkey, and Kazakhstan won 2 gold medals each. Japan won the overall medal tally.
- September 6 – 8: K1PL #5 in Tokyo
  - Japan won both the gold and overall medal tallies.
- October 4 – 6: K1PL #6 in (Russia) Moscow
  - Iran won the gold medal tally. Japan won the overall medal tally.
- November 29 – December 1: K1PL #7 (final) in (Spain) Madrid

=== 2019 Karate 1: Series A ===
- March 1 – 3: K1SA #1 in Salzburg
  - Japan, Iran, and Austria won 2 gold medals each. Japan won the overall medal tally.
- May 17 – 19: K1SA #2 in Istanbul
  - Iran won the gold medal tally. Iran and Turkey won 9 overall medals each.
- June 21 – 23: K1SA #3 in (Canada) Montreal
  - Japan won both the gold and overall medal tallies.
- September 20 – 22: K1SA #4 in (Chile) Santiago
  - Japan won both the gold and overall medal tallies.

=== 2019 Karate1 Youth League ===
- May 3 – 5: K1YL #1 in (Cyprus) Limassol
  - Russia won both the gold and overall medal tallies.
- July 5 – 7: K1YL #2 in (Croatia) Umag
  - Japan and Egypt won 4 gold medals each. Japan won the overall medal tally.
- September 27 – 29: K1YL #3 in Monterrey
  - Japan and Spain won 5 gold medals each. Mexico won the overall medal tally.
- December 13 – 15: K1YL #4 (final) in (Italy) Caorle-Venice

== Taekwondo ==
=== International Taekwondo championships ===
- February 7 – 12: 2019 President's Cup - European Region in Antalya
  - Senior: Great Britain and Turkey won 4 gold medals each. Russia won the overall medal tally.
  - Junior: Russia won both the gold and overall medal tallies.
  - Cadet: Russia won both the gold and overall medal tallies.
- February 26 & 27: 2019 Asian Taekwondo Clubs Championships in Kish Island
  - Iran won all the gold medals and won the overall medal tally, too.
- February 28 – March 3: 2019 European Taekwondo Clubs Championships in Thessaloniki
  - Senior: Russia won both the gold and overall medal tallies.
  - Junior: Greece won both the gold and overall medal tallies.
  - Cadet: Greece won both the gold and overall medal tallies.
- February 28 – March 3: 2019 President's Cup - Asian Region in Kish Island
  - Senior: Iran and China won 5 gold medals each. Iran won the overall medal tally.
  - Junior: Iran won both the gold and overall medal tallies.
- March 21 – 24: 2019 WTE Multi European Taekwondo Championships in (Bulgaria) Sofia
  - Senior: Russia won both the gold and overall medal tallies.
  - Junior: Russia won both the gold and overall medal tallies.
  - Cadet: Greece won both the gold and overall medal tallies.
- April 6 & 7: 2019 President's Cup - African Region in (Morocco) Agadir
  - Croatia won the gold medal tally. Croatia and Spain won 9 overall medals each.
- April 26 – 28: First Qualification Tournament for Wuxi 2019 WT Grand Slam Champions Series in China
  - China won both the gold and overall medal tallies.
- May 15 – 19: 2019 World Taekwondo Championships in (United Kingdom) Manchester
  - South Korea won the gold medal tally. South Korea and China won 7 overall medals each.
- June 7 – 9: 2019 World Taekwondo Grand Prix in (Italy) Rome
  - Men's 58 kg winner: (South Korea) Jang Jun
  - Men's 68 kg winner: (Iran) Mirhashem Hosseini
  - Men's 80 kg winner: (Russia) Maksim Khramtsov
  - Men's +80 kg winner: (Russia) Vladislav Larin
  - Women's 49 kg winner: (Russia) Elizaveta Ryadninskaya
  - Women's 57 kg winner: (South Korea) Lee Ah-reum
  - Women's 67 kg winner: (Croatia) Matea Jelić
  - Women's +67 kg winner: (South Korea) Lee Da-bin
- June 14 – 16: 2019 Pan American (Senior, Junior, & Cadet) Taekwondo Championships in Portland, Oregon
  - Senior: Canada won the gold medal tally. Canada and the United States won 17 overall medals each.
  - Junior: The United States won both the gold and overall medal tallies.
  - Cadet: The United States won both the gold and overall medal tallies.
- June 27: 2019 President's Cup - Oceania Region in Gold Coast, Queensland
  - Senior: Chinese Taipei and Great Britain won 3 gold medals each. Chinese Taipei won the overall medal tally.
  - Junior: Australia won both the gold and overall medal tallies.
  - Cadet: Australia won both the gold and overall medal tallies.
- July 7 – 13: Part of the 2019 Summer Universiade in (Italy) Naples
  - With poomsae: South Korea won both the gold and overall medal tallies.
  - Without poomsae: Iran won the gold medal tally. South Korea won the overall medal tally.
- July 15 – 17: 2019 Kimunyong Cup International Open Taekwondo Championships in Seoul
  - South Korea won both the gold and overall medal tallies.
- July 18 – 20: 2019 Oceania Taekwondo Championships & Part of the 2019 Pacific Games in (Samoa) Apia
  - Oceania: Australia won both the gold and overall medal tallies.
  - Pacific Games: Australia won both the gold and overall medal tallies.
- July 21 – 24: 2019 Asian Junior & Cadet Taekwondo Championships in (Jordan) Amman
  - Junior: Iran won both the gold and overall medal tallies.
  - Cadet: Iran won both the gold and overall medal tallies.
- July 26 – 28: 2019 El Hassan Taekwondo Cup in Amman
  - Jordan won both the gold and overall medal tallies.
- July 27 – 29: Part of the 2019 Pan American Games in (Peru) Lima
  - Men's 58 kg winner: (Argentina) Lucas Guzmán
  - Men's 68 kg winner: (Brazil) Edival Pontes
  - Men's 80 kg winner: (Colombia) Miguel Angel Trejos
  - Men's +80 kg winner: (United States) Jonathan Healy
  - Women's 49 kg winner: (Mexico) Daniela Souza
  - Women's 57 kg winner: (United States) Anastasija Zolotic
  - Women's 67 kg winner: (Brazil) Milena Titoneli
  - Women's +67 kg winner: (Mexico) Briseida Acosta
- August 7 – 10: 2019 World Cadet Taekwondo Championships in (Uzbekistan) Tashkent
  - Iran won both the gold and overall medal tallies.
- August 15 – 18: 2019 Asian Open Taekwondo Championships in Ho Chi Minh City
  - Senior: Chinese Taipei and South Korea won 4 gold medals each. Chinese Taipei won the overall medal tally.
  - Junior: Vietnam won both the gold and overall medal tallies.
  - Cadet: Vietnam won both the gold and overall medal tallies.
- August 21 – 23: Part of the 2019 African Games in Rabat
  - Morocco won the gold medal tally. Morocco and Egypt won 11 overall medals each.
- September 5 – 8: 2019 European U21 Taekwondo Championships in (Sweden) Helsingborg
  - Russia won both the gold and overall medal tallies.
- September 13 – 15: 2019 World Taekwondo Grand Prix in (Japan) Chiba
  - Men's 58 kg winner: (South Korea) Jang Jun
  - Men's 68 kg winner: (Iran) Mirhashem Hosseini
  - Men's 80 kg winner: (Azerbaijan) Milad Beigi
  - Men's +80 kg winner: (South Korea) In Kyo-don
  - Women's 49 kg winner: (Thailand) Panipak Wongpattanakit
  - Women's 57 kg winner: (Turkey) Hatice Kübra İlgün
  - Women's 67 kg winner: (France) Magda Wiet-Henin
  - Women's +67 kg winner: (China) Zheng Shuyin
- October 1 – 3: 2019 European Taekwondo Cadet Championships in (Spain) Marina d'Or
  - Russia won both the gold and overall medal tallies.
- October 4 – 6: 2019 European Taekwondo Junior Championships in (Spain) Marina d'Or
  - Senior: Russia won both the gold and overall medal tallies.
  - Junior: Russia won both the gold and overall medal tallies.
- October 10 – 13: 2019 President's Cup - Pan American Region in Las Vegas
  - Senior: Mexico won the gold medal tally. Mexico and the United States won 12 overall medals each.
  - Junior: The United States won both the gold and overall medal tallies.
  - Cadet: The United States won both the gold and overall medal tallies.
- October 11 – 13: 2019 World Taekwondo Beach Championships in (Egypt) Sahl Hasheesh
  - Thailand won both the gold and overall medal tallies.
- October 18 – 20: 2019 World Taekwondo Grand Prix in (Bulgaria) Sofia
  - Men's 58 kg winner: (South Korea) Jang Jun
  - Men's 68 kg winner: (China) Zhao Shuai
  - Men's 80 kg winner: (Jordan) Saleh El-Sharabaty
  - Men's +80 kg winner: (Brazil) Maicon Andrade
  - Women's 49 kg winner: (China) Wu Jingyu
  - Women's 57 kg winner: (China) Zhou Lijun
  - Women's 67 kg winner: (Ivory Coast) Ruth Gbagbi
  - Women's +67 kg winner: (China) Zheng Shuyin
- October 23 – 26: Part of the 2019 Military World Games in Wuhan
  - China and Uzbekistan won 4 gold medals each. China won the overall medal tally.
- November 1 – 3: 2019 Extra European Taekwondo Championships in (Italy) Bari
- November 1 – 3: Second Qualification Tournament for Wuxi 2019 WT Grand Slam Champions Series in China
- November 29 & 30: 2019 European Taekwondo Championships (Olympic Weights) in (Republic of Ireland) Dublin
- November 30 & December 1: 2019 European Taekwondo Masters Championships in (Republic of Ireland) Dublin
- November 30 & December 1: 2019 European Taekwondo Championships (Youth Olympic Weights for Clubs) in (Republic of Ireland) Dublin

=== 2019 WTF Open ===
- February 1 – 3: Cyprus Open in Larnaca
  - Senior: Serbia and the United States won 3 gold medals each. Greece won the overall medal tally.
  - Junior: Greece won the gold medal tally. Greece and Cyprus won 21 overall medals each.
  - Cadet: Cyprus won both the gold and overall medal tallies.
- February 1 – 3: Fujairah Open in the United Arab Emirates
  - Kazakhstan won both the gold and overall medal tallies.
- February 8 – 10: Nigeria Open in Abuja
  - Nigeria won both the gold and overall medal tallies.
- February 13 – 17: Turkish Open in Antalya
  - Senior: Uzbekistan won the gold medal tally. Uzbekistan and Turkey won 8 overall medals each.
  - Junior: Turkey won both the gold and overall medal tallies.
  - Cadet: Turkey won both the gold and overall medal tallies.
- February 21 – 24: Egypt Open in Hurghada
  - Senior: Spain won both the gold and overall medal tallies.
  - Cadet: Egypt won both the gold and overall medal tallies.
- February 23 & 24: Slovenia Open in Ljubljana
  - Russia won both the gold and overall medal tallies.
- February 28 – March 3: United States Open in Las Vegas
  - Senior: Turkey won the gold medal tally. The United States won the overall medal tally.
  - Junior: The United States won both the gold and overall medal tallies.
  - Cadet: The United States won both the gold and overall medal tallies.
- March 4 & 5: Fajr Open in Kish Island
  - Iran won both the gold and overall medal tallies.
- March 9 & 10: Dutch Open in (Netherlands) Eindhoven
  - Senior: France and Turkey won 3 gold medals each. Germany won the overall medal tally.
  - Junior: France won the gold medal tally. Germany won the overall medal tally.
  - Cadet: Germany won both the gold and overall medal tallies.
- March 9 & 10: Dominican Republic Open in Santo Domingo
  - Mexico won both the gold and overall medal tallies.
- March 16 & 17: Belgian Open in (Belgium) Lommel
  - Senior: Croatia won both the gold and overall medal tallies.
  - Junior: Thailand won the gold medal tally. Spain won the overall medal tally.
  - Cadet: Germany won both the gold and overall medal tallies.
- March 30 & 31: German Open in (Germany) Hamburg
  - China won the gold medal tally. China and Russia won 12 overall medals each.
- April 5 – 7: Puerto Rico Open in San Juan
  - Mexico won the gold medal tally. Mexico and Canada won 14 overall medals each.
- April 11 – 14: Mexico Open in Mexico City
  - Mexico won both the gold and overall medal tallies.
- April 12 – 14: Ukraine Open in Kharkiv
  - Senior: Azerbaijan won the gold medal tally. Ukraine won the overall medal tally.
  - Junior: Ukraine won both the gold and overall medal tallies.
  - Cadet: Ukraine won both the gold and overall medal tallies.
- April 14: Spanish Open in Castellón de la Plana
  - Turkey won the gold medal tally. Spain won the overall medal tally.
- April 20 & 21: Sofia Open in Bulgaria
  - Senior: Mexico won both the gold and overall medal tallies.
  - Junior: Greece won the gold medal tally. Serbia won the overall medal tally.
  - Cadet: Serbia and Bulgaria won 4 gold medals each. Serbia and Greece won 13 overall medals each.
- June 8 & 9: Austrian Open in (Austria) Innsbruck
  - Senior: Russia won the gold medal tally. Germany won the overall medal tally.
  - Junior: Germany won both the gold and overall medal tallies.
  - Cadet: Germany won both the gold and overall medal tallies.
- June 11 – 16: India Open in Hyderabad
  - India won both the gold and overall medal tallies.
- June 15 & 16: Luxembourg Open in Luxembourg City
  - Senior: Spain and Great Britain won 3 gold medals each. Spain won the overall medal tally.
  - Junior: Spain won the gold medal tally. Germany won the overall medal tally.
  - Cadet: Germany won both the gold and overall medal tallies.
- June 28 & 29: Australian Open in Gold Coast, Queensland
  - Senior: Russia won the gold medal tally. Chinese Taipei won the overall medal tally.
  - Junior: Australia won both the gold and overall medal tallies.
  - Cadet: Australia won both the gold and overall medal tallies.
- July 5 – 10: Korea Open in Chuncheon
  - South Korea won both the gold and overall medal tallies.
- August 29 – September 1: Costa Rica Open in San José
  - Brazil won both the gold and overall medal tallies.
- September 6 – 8: Beirut Open in Lebanon
  - Senior: Jordan won the gold medal tally. Lebanon won the overall medal tally.
  - Junior: Lebanon won both the gold and overall medal tallies.
  - Cadet: Lebanon won both the gold and overall medal tallies.
- September 12 – 15: Chile Open in Viña del Mar
  - Brazil won both the gold and overall medal tallies.
- September 20 – 22: Albanian Open in (Albania) Tirana
  - Turkey won the gold medal tally. Greece won the overall medal tally.
- September 21 & 22: Polish Open in Warsaw
  - Senior: Russia won the gold medal tally. Spain won the overall medal tally.
  - Junior: Poland won both the gold and overall medal tallies.
  - Cadet: Poland, Croatia, Germany, and Spain won 3 gold medals each. Poland won the overall medal tally.
- September 28 & 29: Russia Open in Moscow
  - Russia won both the gold and overall medal tallies.
- October 4 – 6: Canada Open in Montreal
  - Senior: Canada won both the gold and overall medal tallies.
  - Junior: The United States won the gold medal tally. The United States and Canada won 32 overall medals each.
  - Cadet: The United States won both the gold and overall medal tallies.
- October 5 & 6: Riga Open in Latvia
  - Senior: Ukraine won the gold medal tally. Belarus won the overall medal tally.
  - Junior: Belarus won both the gold and overall medal tallies.
  - Cadet: Russia won both the gold and overall medal tallies.
- October 11 – 13: Bosnia and Herzegovina Open in Zenica
  - Croatia won both the gold and overall medal tallies.
- October 18 – 20: Greece Open in Chalcis (Chalkida)
  - Senior: Greece won both the gold and overall medal tallies.
  - Junior: Greece won both the gold and overall medal tallies.
  - Cadet: Greece won both the gold and overall medal tallies.
- October 26 & 27: Serbia Open in Belgrade
  - Senior: Mexico won the gold medal tally. Serbia won the overall medal tally.
  - Junior:
  - Cadet:
- November 1 – 3: Palestine Open in Nablus
  - Jordan and Turkey won 6 gold medals each. Jordan won the overall medal tally.
- November 7 – 9: China Open in Xi'an
- November 9 & 10: Croatia Open in Zagreb
- November 16 & 17: Dracula Open in (Romania) Iași
- November 16 & 17: French Open in (France) Paris
- November 23 & 24: Israel Open in Ramla

== Wrestling ==
=== World wrestling championships ===
- July 29 – August 4: 2019 World Cadet Wrestling Championships in (Bulgaria) Sofia
  - Cadet Men's Freestyle: Russia won the gold medal tally. Russia and Iran won 7 overall medals each.
  - Cadet Women's Freestyle: Japan won both the gold and overall medal tallies.
  - Cadet Greco-Roman: Iran won the gold medal tally. Azerbaijan won the overall medal tally.
- August 11: 2019 World Junior & Cadet Beach Wrestling Championships in (Ukraine) Odesa

- Junior Men's 60 kg: (Turkey) Furkan Cay
- Junior Men's 70 kg: (Ukraine) Maksym Lavrov
- Junior Men's 80 kg: (Turkey) Buluthan Oksuz
- Junior Men's +80 kg: (Ukraine) Roman Dovhaliuk
- Cadet Men's 60 kg: (Turkey) Ahmet Gizir
- Cadet Men's 70 kg: (Ukraine) Andrii Zheliev
- Cadet Men's +70 kg: (Greece) Angelos Kouklaris

- Junior Women's 50 kg: (Ukraine) Kateryna Chalenko
- Junior Women's 60 kg: (Turkey) Zeynep Yildirim
- Junior Women's +60 kg: (Norway) Cathrine Frilseth
- Cadet Women's 50 kg: (Kazakhstan) Maral Tangirbergenova
- Cadet Women's +50 kg: (United States) Amit Elor

- August 12 – 18: 2019 World Junior Wrestling Championships in (Estonia) Tallinn
  - Junior Men's Freestyle: Russia, the United States, Iran, & Japan won 2 gold medals each. Russia won the overall medal tally.
  - Junior Women's Freestyle: Japan won both the gold and overall medal tallies.
  - Junior Greco-Roman: Russia won both the gold and overall medal tallies.
- September 14 – 22: 2019 World Wrestling Championships in (Kazakhstan) Nur-Sultan
  - Men's Freestyle: Russia won both the gold and overall medal tallies.
  - Women's Freestyle: The United States won the gold medal tally. Japan won the overall medal tally.
  - Greco-Roman: Russia, Georgia, and Japan won 2 gold medals each. Russia won the overall medal tally.
- October 28 – November 3: 2019 World U23 Wrestling Championships in (Hungary) Budapest
  - U23 Men's Freestyle: Iran won the gold medal tally. Russia won the overall medal tally.
  - U23 Women's Freestyle: Japan won both the gold and overall medal tallies.
  - U23 Greco-Roman: Iran won both the gold and overall medal tallies.

=== Wrestling World Cup ===
- March 16 & 17: 2019 Men's Freestyle World Cup in Yakutsk
  - Champions: Russia; Second: Iran; Third: United States
- November 16 & 17: 2019 Women's Freestyle World Cup in (Japan) Narita
- November 30 & December 1: 2019 Men's Greco-Roman World Cup in (Iran) Tehran
- December 5 & 6: 2019 World Wrestling Clubs Cup (Greco-Roman) in (Iran) Tehran
- December 19 & 20: 2019 World Wrestling Clubs Cup (Men's Freestyle) in (Iran) Tehran

=== Wrestling Grand Prix ===
- January 24 – 27: 2019 Grand Prix Ivan Yariguin in Krasnoyarsk
  - Men's Freestyle: Russia won all the gold medals and won the overall medal tally, too.
  - Women's Freestyle: Russia and Japan won 3 gold medals each. Russia won the overall medal tally.
- February 1 – 3: 2019 Grand Prix de France Henri Deglane in Nice
  - Men's Freestyle: Georgia won both the gold and overall medal tallies.
  - Women's Freestyle: Kyrgyzstan and Azerbaijan won 2 gold medals each. Kyrgyzstan won the overall medal tally.
  - Greco-Roman: Armenia won both the gold and overall medal tallies.
- February 9 & 10: 2019 Grand Prix Zagreb Open in Croatia
  - Greco-Roman: Uzbekistan and Hungary won 2 gold medals each. Turkey won the overall medal tally.
- February 22 – 24: 2019 Grand Prix of Germany (Women's Freestyle) in Dormagen
  - Women's Freestyle: The United States and Canada won 3 gold medals each. The United States won the overall medal tally.
- February 23 & 24: 2019 Hungarian Grand Prix (Polyák Imre Memorial) in Győr
  - Greco-Roman: Georgia and South Korea won 2 gold medals each. Hungary and Ukraine won 4 overall medals each.
- July 5 – 7: 2019 Grand Prix of Spain in Madrid
  - Men's Freestyle: Germany and the United States won 2 gold medals each. Germany won the overall medal tally.
  - Women's Freestyle: Russia won both the gold and overall medal tallies.
  - Greco-Roman: Russia and Ukraine won 4 gold medals each. Russia won the overall medal tally.
- August 3 & 4: 2019 Grand Prix of Germany (Greco-Roman) in Dortmund
  - Greco-Roman: Russia won both the gold and overall medal tallies.
- August 7 – 11: 2019 Tbilisi Grand Prix of V. Balavadze and G. Kartozia in Georgia
  - Men's Freestyle: Georgia won both the gold and overall medal tallies.
  - Greco-Roman: Iran won both the gold and overall medal tallies.

=== Continental and regional wrestling championships ===
- March 4 – 10: 2019 U23 Senior European Wrestling Championships in (Serbia) Novi Sad
  - Men's U23 Freestyle: Russia won both the gold and overall medal tallies.
  - Women's U23 Freestyle: Russia won both the gold and overall medal tallies.
  - U23 Greco-Roman: Georgia won the gold medal tally. Russia and Turkey won 8 overall medals each.
- March 21 – 24: 2019 U23 Senior Asian Championships in Ulaanbaatar
  - Men's U23 Freestyle: Iran won both the gold and overall medal tallies.
  - Women's U23 Freestyle: Mongolia and India won 4 gold medals each. Mongolia won the overall medal tally.
  - U23 Greco-Roman: Iran and Kyrgyzstan won 4 gold medals each. Iran won the overall medal tally.
- March 26 – 31: 2019 African Wrestling Championships (Senior, Junior, & Cadet) in Hammamet
  - Men's Freestyle: Egypt and Tunisia won 3 gold medals each. Egypt won the overall medal tally.
  - Women's Freestyle: Nigeria won the gold medal tally. Nigeria and Tunisia won 9 overall medals each.
  - Greco-Roman: Egypt won both the gold and overall medal tallies.
  - Men's Junior Freestyle: Algeria, Egypt, and South Africa won 3 gold medals each. Algeria and Egypt won 7 overall medals each.
  - Women's Junior Freestyle: Tunisia won both the gold and overall medal tallies.
  - Junior Greco-Roman: Egypt won the gold medal tally. Egypt and Tunisia won 9 overall medals each.
  - Men's Cadet Freestyle: Tunisia and South Africa won 3 gold medals each. Tunisia won the overall medal tally.
  - Women's Cadet Freestyle: Tunisia won both the gold and overall medal tallies.
  - Cadet Greco-Roman: Egypt won both the gold and overall medal tallies.
- April 8 – 14: 2019 European Wrestling Championships in (Romania) Bucharest
  - Men's Freestyle: Turkey and Azerbaijan won 3 gold medals each. Russia won the overall medal tally.
  - Women's Freestyle: Ukraine won both the gold and overall medal tallies.
  - Greco-Roman: Russia won both the gold and overall medal tallies.
- April 18 – 21: 2019 Pan American Wrestling Championships in (Argentina) Buenos Aires
  - Men's Freestyle: United States won all the gold medals and won the overall medal tally, too.
  - Women's Freestyle: United States won both the gold and overall medal tallies.
  - Greco-Roman: United States and Cuba won 4 gold medals each. The United States won the overall medal tally.
- April 20 & 21: 2019 Oceania Wrestling Championships (Senior, Junior, & Cadet) in Yona
  - Note: There was no junior & cadet women's freestyle events here.
  - Men's Freestyle: Guam won the gold medal tally. Australia won the overall medal tally.
  - Women's Freestyle: New Zealand and Guam won 2 gold medals each. New Zealand won the overall medal tally.
  - Greco-Roman: Palau won the gold medal tally. Palau and the Federated States of Micronesia 3 overall medals each.
  - Men's Junior Freestyle: Australia won the gold medal tally. Australia and the Federated States of Micronesia won 4 overall medals each.
  - Junior Greco-Roman: The Federated States of Micronesia won both the gold and overall medal tallies.
  - Men's Cadet Freestyle: Guam won the gold medal tally. Australia won the overall medal tally.
  - Cadet Greco-Roman: Nauru won by default.
- April 23 – 28: 2019 Asian Wrestling Championships in Xi'an
  - Men's Freestyle: Iran won both the gold and overall medal tallies.
  - Women's Freestyle: Japan and China won 4 gold medals each. Japan won the overall medal tally.
  - Greco-Roman: Iran won the gold medal tally. Iran and Kazakhstan won 7 overall medals each.
- May 2 – 5: 2019 Mediterranean Cadet & U23 Wrestling Championships in Tunis
  - Cadet Men's Freestyle: Tunisia won both the gold and overall medal tallies.
  - Cadet Women's Freestyle: Tunisia won both the gold and overall medal tallies.
  - Cadet Greco-Roman: Algeria won the gold medal tally. Tunisia won the overall medal tally.
  - U23 Men's Freestyle: Tunisia won both the gold and overall medal tallies.
  - U23 Women's Freestyle: Tunisia won both the gold and overall medal tallies.
  - U23 Greco-Roman: Algeria won the gold medal tally. Tunisia won the overall medal tally.
- May 4: 2019 Nordic Junior & Cadet Wrestling Championships in Daugavpils
  - Note: There was no junior men's and women's freestyle events here.
  - Junior Greco-Roman: Norway won both the gold and overall medal tallies.
  - Cadet Men's Freestyle: Latvia won both the gold and overall medal tallies.
  - Cadet Women's Freestyle: Norway won the gold medal tally. Sweden won the overall medal tally.
  - Cadet Greco-Roman: Sweden won the gold medal tally. Finland and Denmark won 6 overall medals each.
- May 11: 2019 Nordic (Senior) Wrestling Championships in Kristiansund
  - Women's Freestyle: Norway and Sweden both won 2 gold medals and 4 overall medals each.
  - Greco-Roman: Norway and Finland won 3 gold medals each. Norway won the overall medal tally.
- June 3 – 9: 2019 European Junior Wrestling Championships in (Spain) Pontevedra
  - Junior Men's Freestyle: Russia won both the gold and overall medal tallies.
  - Junior Women's Freestyle: Russia won the gold medal tally. Ukraine won the overall medal tally.
  - Junior Greco-Roman: Georgia and Hungary won 3 gold medals each. Russia won the overall medal tally.
- June 5 – 7: 2019 Pan American Junior Wrestling Championships in Guatemala City
  - Junior Men's Freestyle: The United States won both the gold and overall medal tallies.
  - Junior Women's Freestyle: The United States won both the gold and overall medal tallies.
  - Junior Greco-Roman: Mexico won the gold medal tally. The United States won the overall medal tally.
- June 17 – 23: 2019 European Cadet Wrestling Championships in (Italy) Faenza
  - Cadet Men's Freestyle: Russia won both the gold and overall medal tallies.
  - Cadet Women's Freestyle: Russia won both the gold and overall medal tallies.
  - Cadet Greco-Roman: Russia and Azerbaijan won 3 gold medals each. Russia won the overall medal tally.
- June 27 – 30: 2019 European U15 Wrestling Championships in (Poland) Kraków
  - U15 Men's Freestyle: Russia won both the gold and overall medal tallies.
  - U15 Women's Freestyle: Russia won the gold medal tally. Ukraine won the overall medal tally.
  - U15 Greco-Roman: Russia won both the gold and overall medal tallies.
- June 28 – 30: 2019 Pan American Cadet Wrestling Championships in Morelia
  - Cadet Men's Freestyle: The United States won both the gold and overall medal tallies.
  - Cadet Women's Freestyle: The United States won both the gold and overall medal tallies.
  - Cadet Greco-Roman: The United States won the gold medal tally. Mexico won the overall medal tally.
- July 4 – 7: 2019 Asian Cadet Wrestling Championships in Nur-Sultan
  - Cadet Men's Freestyle: Iran won both the gold and overall medal tallies.
  - Cadet Women's Freestyle: Japan won the gold medal tally. China won the overall medal tally.
  - Cadet Greco-Roman: Iran won the gold medal tally. Iran, Kazakhstan, & India won 7 overall medals each.
- July 9 – 14: 2019 Asian Junior Wrestling Championships in (Thailand) Chonburi
  - Junior Men's Freestyle: Iran won both the gold and overall medal tallies.
  - Junior Women's Freestyle: Japan won both the gold and overall medal tallies.
  - Junior Greco-Roman: Iran won both the gold and overall medal tallies.
- October 16 – 22: 2019 Arab Junior & Cadet Wrestling Championships in (Iraq) Sulaymaniyah
- November 19 – 23: 2019 South American Wrestling Championships (Senior, Junior, & Cadet) in (Chile) Santiago
- November 25 & 26: 2019 Arab Wrestling Championships in (Egypt) Cairo

== Wushu ==
- October 20 – 23: 2019 World Wushu Championships in Shanghai
  - China won both the gold and overall medal tallies.
