= Amritpal Kaur =

Indian Karate athlete

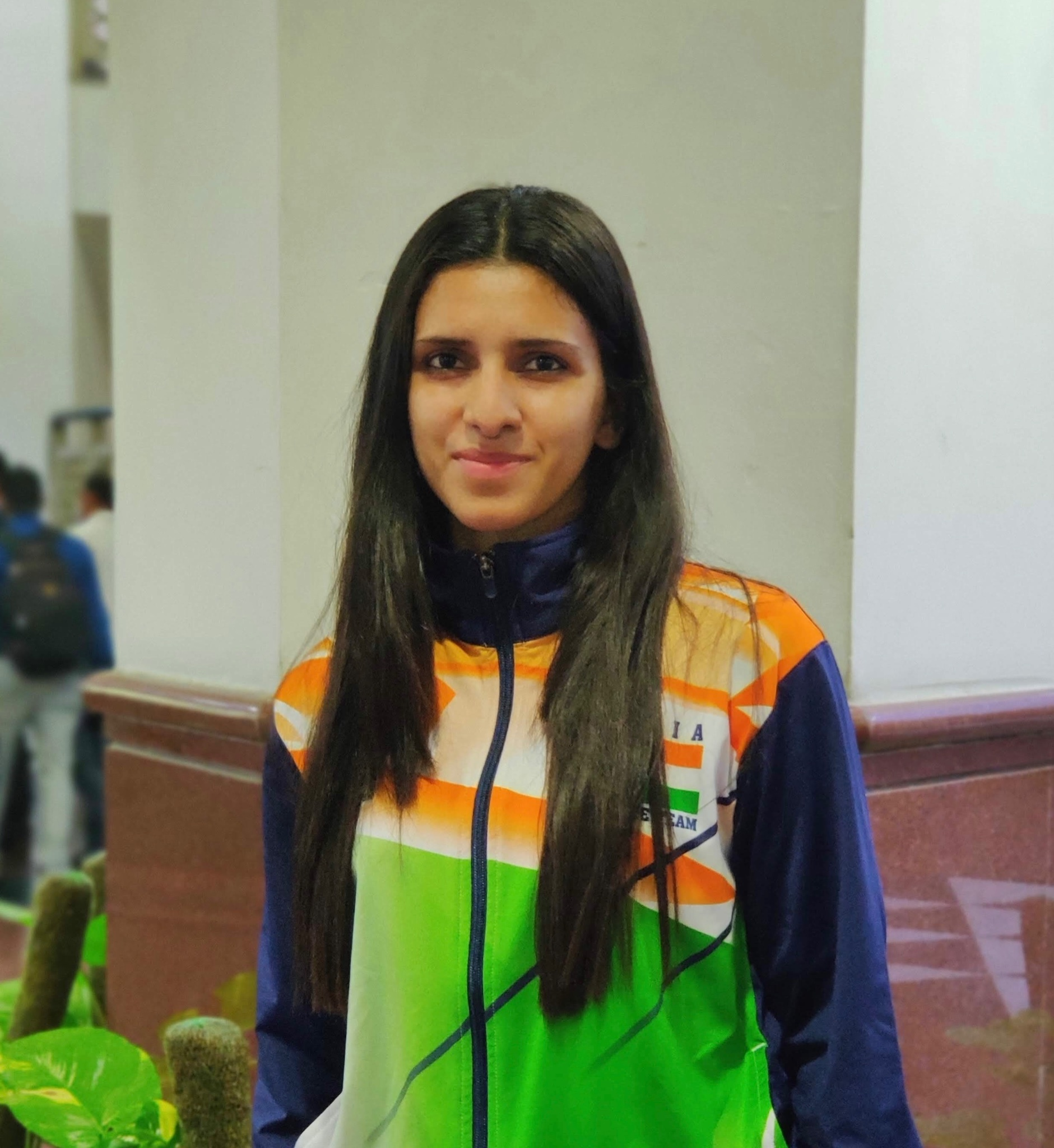

Personal information
- Nationality: Indian
- Height: 159 cm (5 ft 3 in)
- Weight: 54 kg (119 lb)

Sport
- Sport: Karate
- Event: South Asian Karate champion

Amritpal Kaur is an Indian karate athlete known for her achievements in the sport. As a black belt holder in Sito Tyo Seiko Kai, Kaur has represented India in various national and international competitions.

== Early life and education ==
Amritpal Kaur was born Amritpal Kaur Manpotra on 15 September 1997. She was raised in a lower-middle-class Ramgarhia Sikh family in New Delhi, India. She developed in interest in martial arts as a 13-year-old traveling alone in Delhi. She played badminton in high school.

Kaur attended Janki Devi Memorial College, from which she graduated with English Honours.

== Athletic career ==
During her time at Janki Devi Memorial College, Kaur began learning karate as a means of self-defense. She demonstrated great talent and passion for the sport, which led her to pursue a career in competitive karate. Soon, she joined the national team and started participating in state, national, and international tournaments.

Kaur won a gold medal in the Commonwealth Karate Championships in 2015 and secured the top position in the South Asian Championships for three consecutive years. Kaur did not qualify for the 2020 Tokyo Olympics, as she was unable to attend the qualifying matches in Europe and then suffered an ACL injury.

In 2022 film producer Sujay Jairaj optioned her story for a movie. Jairaj, known for securing the rights for a film on former world number one badminton player Saina Nehwal, also initiated a funding campaign for Amritpal on Ketto.

== Awards and achievements ==
Amritpal Kaur has received several accolades and achieved notable success in the field of karate. Her accomplishments include:

- Commonwealth Karate Championship 2015: Gold Medal
- South Asian Karate Championship 2016: Gold Medal
- Asian Karate Championship 2017: 5th Rank
- South Asian Karate Championship 2017: Gold Medal
- Asian Karate Championship 2018: Bronze Medal
- South Asian Karate Championship 2019: Gold Medal
- World Karate Championship 2021: Participation
- World Karate Series A 2022: 7th Rank

== Personal life ==
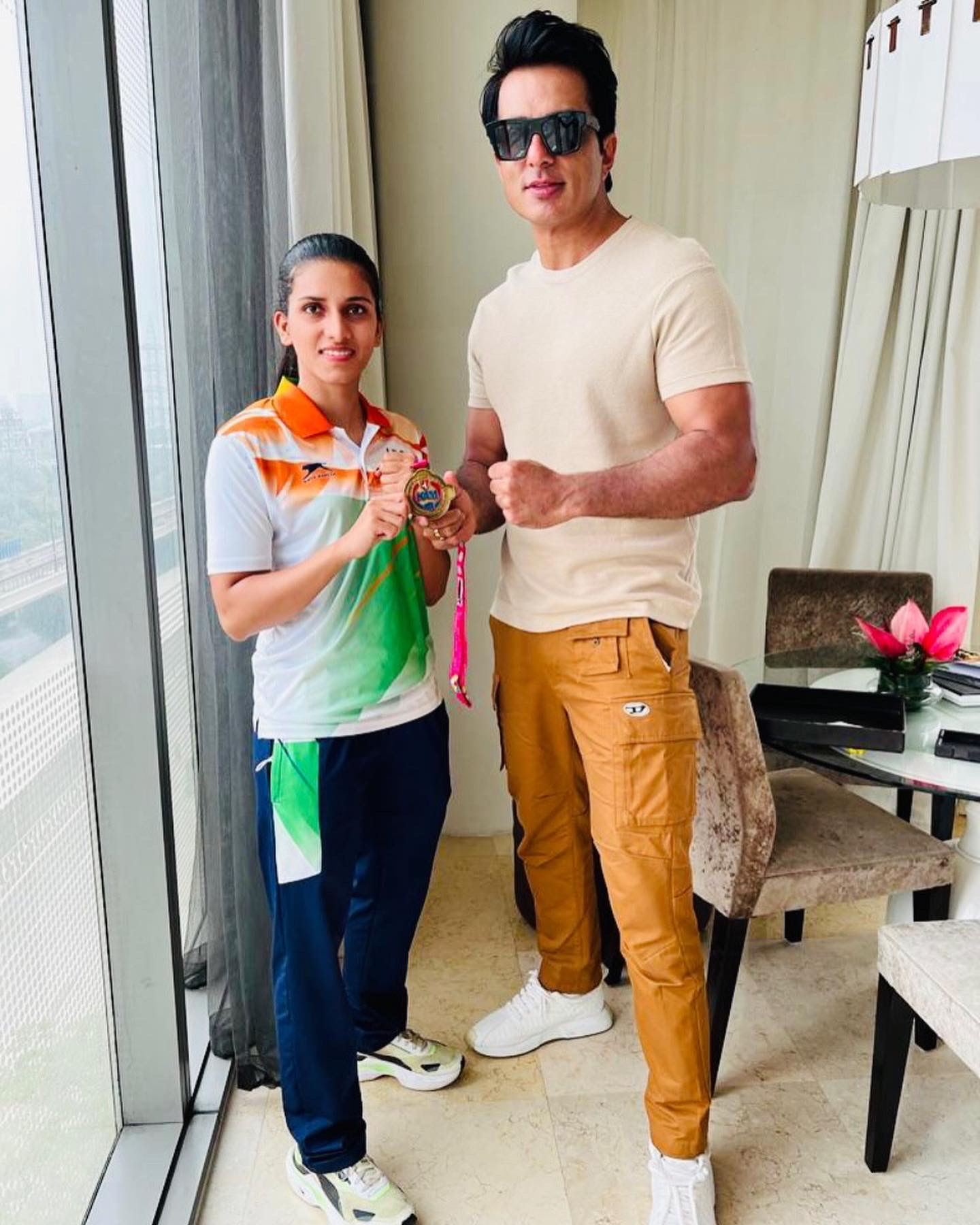
Amritpal Kaur and Sonu Sood

Amritpal Kaur gained significant attention after receiving assistance from Bollywood actor and social worker Sonu Sood for her knee surgery in 2020. The story was featured on The Kapil Sharma Show. A video clip showcasing Kaur's journey and expressing gratitude towards Sonu Sood for his support was shared on the India Times Facebook page.

Apart from her athletic career, Kaur leads a private life.
