= Karate R. Thiagarajan =

Indian politician

46th Mayor of Chennai
- In office October 2002 – October 2006
- Preceded by: M.K. Stalin
- Succeeded by: M. Subramaniam

Personal details
- Party: Bharatiya Janata Party
- Other political affiliations: Tamil Maanila Congress (1996-1998), AIADMK (2001-2005) Indian National Congress (1986-1996,1998-2001 and from 2006 -2021)

Karate R. Thiagarajan is an Indian politician from the Bharatiya Janata party (BJP). He was part of the AIADMK and congress before joining the BJP in February 2021. He was the 38th Mayor of Chennai in Tamil Nadu from October 2002 to October 2006. Thiagarajan is also a karate practitioner, and holds a black belt in the martial art.

== Karate association of India ==
He was the president of Karate Association of India one of the two bodies running Karate in India and is involved in a dispute with All India Karate- do Federation. He was earlier the President of the All India Karate- do Federation but was removed for alleged misappropriation of funds and Sanjay Singh became the President.

== Political career ==
Thiagarajan was elected to the Chennai Corporation as an AIADMK councillor and he became the deputy Mayor in-charge of Corporation of Chennai and after M. K. Stalin who had been reelected Mayor in 2001 was removed in 2002 and Thiagarajan who was the deputy Mayor became the de facto mayor and in-charge of Corporation of Chennai. He was an instrumental in filing cases in the construction of flyovers case. He was expelled from the AIADMK in 2005 and there was apprehension that he may be arrested over allegations relating to with irregularities in the allotment of space for hoardings. Thiagarajan went into hiding for over 6 months and returned before the 2006 elections and rejoined the Congress.

The All India Congress Committee suspended Thiagarajan in June 2019 for anti-party activities. He joined BJP in February 2021.
