= 2018 in combat sports =

This article lists the 12 different combat sports and their results for 2018.

== Boxing ==
=== Amateur boxing ===
- March 24 – April 2: 2018 EUBC Under 22 European Boxing Championships in (Romania) Târgu Jiu
  - Italy, Turkey, and Russia won 3 gold medals each. Italy won the overall medal tally.
- April 17 – 26: 2018 European Youth Boxing Championships in (Italy) Roseto degli Abruzzi
  - Russia won both the gold and overall medal tallies.
- April 19 – 28: 2018 Asian Youth Boxing Championships in (Thailand) Bangkok
  - Kazakhstan won both the gold and overall medal tallies.
- May 5 – 13: 2018 African Youth Boxing Championships in Casablanca
  - Morocco won the gold medal tally. Morocco, Algeria, & Tunisia won 11 overall medals each.
- May 19 – 27: 2018 Pan American Youth Boxing Championships in Colorado Springs, Colorado
  - United States won both the gold and overall medal tallies.
- May 29 – June 2: 2018 Oceania Youth Boxing Championships in (Samoa) Apia
  - Australia won both the gold and overall medal tallies.
- August 20 – 31: 2018 AIBA Youth World Boxing Championships in (Hungary) Budapest
  - For results, click here.
- September 2 – 7: 2018 FISU World University Boxing Championships in (Russia) Elista
- November 15 – 24: 2018 AIBA Women's World Boxing Championships in (India) New Delhi
  - China won both the gold and overall medal tallies.

=== Professional boxing ===
Date	Location	Winner	Loser	Weight	Titles	Report
January 27	Riga, Latvia	Oleksandr Usyk	Mairis Briedis	Cruiserweight	WBC, WBO	report
February 17	Manchester, England	George Groves	Chris Eubank Jr.	Super middleweight	WBA (Super)	report
March 3	New York City, United States	Deontay Wilder	Luis Ortiz	Heavyweight	WBC	report
March 10	San Antonio, United States	Mikey Garcia	Sergey Lipinets	Light welterweight	IBF	
March 31	Cardiff, Wales	Anthony Joshua	Joseph Parker	Heavyweight	WBA (Super), IBF, WBO, IBO	report
May 5	Los Angeles, United States	Gennady Golovkin	Vanes Martirosyan	Middleweight	WBA (Super), WBC, IBO	
May 12	New York City, United States	Vasyl Lomachenko	Jorge Linares	Lightweight	WBA (Super)	
May 19	Quebec City, Canada	Adonis Stevenson	Badou Jack	Light heavyweight	WBC	
July 21	Moscow, Russia	Oleksandr Usyk	Murat Gassiev	Cruiserweight	WBA (Unified), WBC, WBO, IBF	report
July 28	Los Angeles, United States	Mikey Garcia	Robert Easter Jr.	Lightweight	WBC, IBF	
August 4	Atlantic City, United States	Eleider Álvarez	Sergey Kovalev	Light heavyweight	WBO	
September 15	Las Vegas, United States	Canelo Álvarez	Gennady Golovkin	Middleweight	WBA (Super), WBC, IBO	report
September 22	London, England	Anthony Joshua	Alexander Povetkin	Heavyweight	WBA (Super), IBF, WBO, IBO	
September 28	Jeddah, Saudi Arabia	Callum Smith	George Groves	Super middleweight	WBA (Super)	report
October 13	Omaha, United States	Terence Crawford	José Benavidez Jr.	Welterweight	WBO	
October 20	Boston, United States	Demetrius Andrade	Walter Kautondokwa	Middleweight	WBO	
November 10	London, England	Oleksandr Usyk	Tony Bellew	Cruiserweight	WBA (Super), WBC, WBO, IBF	
December 1	Los Angeles, United States	Deontay Wilder SD Tyson Fury		Heavyweight	WBC	report
December 1	Quebec, Canada	Oleksandr Gvozdyk	Adonis Stevenson	Light heavyweight	WBC	
December 8	New York City, United States	Vasyl Lomachenko	José Pedraza	Lightweight	WBA (Super), WBO	
December 15	New York City, United States	Canelo Álvarez	Rocky Fielding	Super middleweight	WBA (Regular)	

== Fencing ==
=== World fencing events ===
- April 1 – 10: 2018 World Junior and Cadet Fencing Championships in (Italy) Verona
  - Russia won the gold medal tally. United States won the overall medal tally.
- July 19 – 27: 2018 World Fencing Championships in (China) Wuxi
  - Italy won the gold medal tally. Italy, South Korea, and Russia won 7 overall medals each.

=== Continental fencing events ===
- February 24 – March 4: 2018 Asian Junior Fencing Championships in (United Arab Emirates) Dubai
  - Junior Épée winners: (South Korea) KIM Myeong-ki (m) / (China) YU Sihan (f)
  - Junior Foil winners: (Japan) Yudai Nagano (m) / (Japan) Yuka Ueno (f)
  - Junior Sabre winners: (South Korea) SONG Eun-gyun (m) / (South Korea) JO Ye-won (f)
  - Junior Team Épée winners: South Korea (m) / Hong Kong (f)
  - Junior Team Foil winners: Japan (m) / Japan (f)
  - Junior Team Sabre winners: South Korea (m) / South Korea (f)
- February 27 – March 11: 2018 Pan American Junior Fencing Championships in (Costa Rica) San José
  - Junior Épée winners: (Brazil) Alexandre Camargo / (Canada) GUO Zishan (f)
  - Junior Foil winners: (United States) Kenji Bravo / (United States) Delphine Devore (f)
  - Junior Sabre winners: (United States) Andrew Doddo / (Mexico) Natalia Botello (f)
  - Junior Team Épée winners: United States (m) / United States (f)
  - Junior Team Foil winners: United States (m) / United States (f)
  - Junior Team Sabre winners: United States (m) / Mexico (f)
- March 1 – 5: 2018 African Junior Fencing Championships in (Nigeria) Lagos
  - Junior Épée winners: (Egypt) Ahmed Elsayed (m) / (Egypt) Lma Huzayen (f)
  - Junior Foil winners: (Egypt) Mohamed Hamza (m) / (Egypt) Yara Elsharkawy (f)
  - Junior Sabre winners: (Tunisia) Ahmed Ferjani (m) / (Algeria) Chaima Benadouda (f)
  - Junior Team Épée winners: Egypt (m) / Egypt (f)
  - Junior Team Foil winners: Egypt (m) / Egypt (f)
  - Junior Team Sabre winners: Algeria (m) / Algeria (f)
- March 2 – 11: 2018 European Junior Fencing Championships in Sochi
  - Junior Épée winners: (Italy) Davide di Veroli (m) / (Italy) Federica Isola (f)
  - Junior Foil winners: (Russia) Kirill Borodachev (m) / (Italy) Martina Favaretto (f)
  - Junior Sabre winners: (France) Maxime Pianfetti (m) / (Russia) Alina Mikhailova (f)
  - Junior Team Épée winners: Hungary (m) / Italy (f)
  - Junior Team Foil winners: Russia (m) / Germany (f)
  - Junior Team Sabre winners: France (m) / Russia (f)
- June 5 – 9: 2018 African Fencing Championships in Tunis
  - Épée winners: (Morocco) Houssam Elkord (m) / (Egypt) Aya Medany (f)
  - Foil winners: (Egypt) Alaaeldin Abouelkassem (m) / (Tunisia) Inès Boubakri (f)
  - Sabre winners: (Tunisia) Farès Ferjani (m) / (Tunisia) Azza Besbes (f)
  - Team Épée winners: Egypt (m) / Egypt (f)
  - Team Foil winners: Egypt (m) / Tunisia (f)
  - Team Sabre winners: Egypt (m) / Tunisia (f)
- June 15 – 20: 2018 Pan American Fencing Championships in (Cuba) Havana
  - Épée winners: (Argentina) Jesús Andrés Lugones Ruggeri (m) / (United States) Kelley Hurley (f)
  - Foil winners: (United States) Race Imboden (m) / (United States) Lee Kiefer (f)
  - Sabre winners: (United States) Eli Dershwitz (m) / (United States) Dagmara Wozniak (f)
  - Team Épée winners: United States (m) / United States (f)
  - Team Foil winners: United States (m) / United States (f)
  - Team Sabre winners: United States (m) / United States (f)
- June 16 – 21: 2018 European Fencing Championships in (Serbia) Novi Sad
  - Épée winners: (France) Yannick Borel (m) / (Estonia) Katrina Lehis (f)
  - Foil winners: (Russia) Aleksey Cheremisinov (m) / (Russia) Inna Deriglazova (f)
  - Sabre winners: (Germany) Max Hartung (m) / (Russia) Sofya Velikaya (f)
  - Team Épée winners: Russia (m) / France (f)
  - Team Foil winners: Russia (m) / Italy (f)
  - Team Sabre winners: Hungary (m) / Russia (f)
- June 17 – 22: 2018 Asian Fencing Championships in (Thailand) Bangkok
  - Épée winners: (South Korea) Jung Jin-sun (m) / (Hong Kong) Vivian Kong (f)
  - Foil winners: (Hong Kong) CHEUNG Siu Lun (m) / (Japan) Komaki Kikuchi (f)
  - Sabre winners: (South Korea) Gu Bon-gil (m) / (South Korea) Kim Ji-yeon (f)
  - Team Épée winners: China (m) / China (f)
  - Team Foil winners: South Korea (m) / South Korea (f)
  - Team Sabre winners: China (m) / China (f)

=== 2017–18 Fencing Grand Prix ===
- Épée Grand Prix
  - December 8 – 10, 2017: Qatari Grand Prix in (Qatar) Doha
    - Winners: (South Korea) Park Sang-young (m) / (Romania) Ana Maria Popescu (f)
  - March 23 – 25: Hungarian Grand Prix in (Hungary) Budapest
    - Winners: (Switzerland) Max Heinzer (m) / (Italy) Mara Navarria (f)
  - May 25 – 27: Colombian Grand Prix in (Colombia) Cali
    - Winners: (France) Yannick Borel (m) / (Hungary) Emese Szász-Kovács (f)
- Foil Grand Prix
  - December 1 – 3, 2017: Italian Grand Prix in (Italy) Turin
    - Winners: (United States) Alexander Massialas (m) / (Russia) Inna Deriglazova (f)
  - March 16 – 18: United States Grand Prix in Long Beach, California
    - Winners: (United States) Race Imboden (m) / (Russia) Inna Deriglazova (f)
  - May 18 – 20: Chinese Grand Prix in (China) Shanghai
    - Winners: (United Kingdom) Richard Kruse (m) / (Russia) Inna Deriglazova (f)
- Sabre Grand Prix
  - December 15 – 17, 2017: Mexican Grand Prix in (Mexico) Cancún
    - Winners: (South Korea) Oh Sang-uk (m) / (Ukraine) Olha Kharlan (f)
  - March 30 – April 1: Korean Grand Prix in (South Korea) Seoul
    - Winners: (Hungary) Áron Szilágyi (m) / (Ukraine) Olha Kharlan (f)
  - May 11 – 13: Russian Grand Prix (final) in (Russia) Moscow
    - Winners: (South Korea) Oh Sang-uk (m) / (Russia) Sofya Velikaya (f)

=== 2017–18 Fencing World Cup ===
- Men's Épée World Cup
  - October 27 – 29, 2017: Swiss World Cup in (Switzerland) Bern
    - Individual: (South Korea) Park Sang-young
    - Team: South Korea
  - November 17 – 19, 2017: Italian Men's Épée World Cup in (Italy) Legnano
    - Individual: (Hungary) András Rédli
    - Team: Russia
  - January 25 – 27: German Men's Épée World Cup in (Germany) Heidenheim an der Brenz
    - Individual: (Japan) Kazuyasu Minobe
    - Team: South Korea
  - February 16 – 18: Canadian World Cup in (Canada) Vancouver
    - Individual: (Ukraine) Bohdan Nikishyn
    - Team: France
  - May 11 – 13: French Men's Épée World Cup in (France) Paris
    - Individual: (Estonia) Nikolai Novosjolov
    - Team: Hungary
- Women's Épée World Cup
  - October 20 – 22, 2017: Estonian World Cup in (Estonia) Tallinn
    - Individual: (Italy) Mara Navarria
    - Team: France
  - November 10 – 12, 2017: Chinese World Cup in (China) Suzhou
    - Individual: (China) Sun Yiwen
    - Team: Poland
  - January 19 – 21: Cuban World Cup in (Cuba) Havana
    - Individual: (France) Coraline Vitalis
    - Team: South Korea
  - February 9 – 11: Spanish Women's Épée World Cup in (Spain) Barcelona
    - Individual: (China) ZHU Mingye
    - Team: Russia
  - May 4 – 6: Emirati World Cup in (United Arab Emirates) Dubai
    - Individual: (China) Sun Yiwen
    - Team: United States
- Men's Foil World Cup
  - October 20 – 22, 2017: Egyptian World Cup in (Egypt) Cairo
    - Individual: (United Kingdom) Richard Kruse
    - Team: United States
  - November 10 – 12, 2017: Japanese World Cup in (Japan) Tokyo
    - Individual: (France) Erwann Le Péchoux
    - Team: United States
  - January 19 – 21: French Men's Foil World Cup in (France) Paris
    - Individual: (Italy) Alessio Foconi
    - Team: United States
  - February 9 – 11: German Men's Foil World Cup in (Germany) Bonn
    - Individual: (Russia) Aleksey Cheremisinov
    - Team: United States
  - May 4 – 6: Russian World Cup in (Russia) Saint Petersburg
    - Individual: (France) Maxime Pauty
    - Team: United States
- Women's Foil World Cup
  - October 13 – 15, 2017: Mexican World Cup in (Mexico) Cancún
    - Individual: (United States) Lee Kiefer
    - Team: Russia
  - November 3 – 5, 2017: French Women's Foil World Cup in (France) Saint-Maur-des-Fossés
    - Individual: (South Korea) Hong Hyo-jin
    - Team: Italy
  - January 12 – 14: Polish Women's Foil World Cup in (Poland) Gdańsk
    - Individual: (Russia) Inna Deriglazova
    - Team: Russia
  - February 2 – 4: Algerian Women's Foil World Cup in (Algeria) Algiers
    - Individual: (Italy) Alice Volpi
    - Team: Russia
  - April 27 – 29: German Women's Foil World Cup in (Germany) Tauberbischofsheim
    - Individual: (Russia) Inna Deriglazova
    - Team: Russia
- Men's Sabre World Cup
  - November 3 – 5, 2017: Algerian Men's Sabre World Cup in (Algeria) Algiers
    - Individual: (United States) Eli Dershwitz
    - Team: Germany
  - December 1 – 3, 2017: Hungarian World Cup in (Hungary) Győr
    - Individual: (South Korea) OH San-guk
    - Team: South Korea
  - February 2 – 4: Italian Men's Sabre World Cup in (Italy) Padua
    - Individual: (United States) Eli Dershwitz
    - Team: South Korea
  - February 23 – 25: Polish Men's Sabre World Cup in (Poland) Warsaw
    - Individual: (South Korea) Gu Bon-gil
    - Team: South Korea
  - May 18 – 20: Spanish Men's Sabre World Cup in (Spain) Madrid
    - Individual: (Italy) Enrico Berrè
    - Team: South Korea
- Women's Sabre World Cup
  - October 27 – 29, 2017: French Women's Sabre World Cup in (France) Orléans
    - Individual: (Italy) Rossella Gregorio
    - Team: Russia
  - November 17 – 19, 2017: Belgian World Cup in (Belgium) Sint-Niklaas
    - Individual: (Ukraine) Olha Kharlan
    - Team: Italy
  - January 26 – 28: American World Cup in (United States) Baltimore
    - Individual: (Italy) Martina Criscio
    - Team: France
  - March 16 – 18: Greek World Cup in (Greece) Athens
    - Individual: (Romania) Bianca Pascu
    - Team: Italy
  - June 1 – 3: Tunisian World Cup in (Tunisia) Tunis
    - Individual: (France) Manon Brunet
    - Team: Russia

== Judo ==
=== World and continental judo events ===
- April 6 & 7: 2018 Oceania Judo Championships in (France) / (New Caledonia) Nouméa
  - Australia won both the gold and overall medal tallies.
- April 12 – 15: 2018 African Judo Championships in Tunis
  - Tunisia and Morocco won 4 gold medals each. Algeria won the overall medal tally.
- April 21 & 22: 2018 Pan American Judo Championships in (Costa Rica) San José
  - Cuba won both the gold and overall medal tallies.
- April 26 – 28: 2018 European Judo Championships in (Israel) Tel Aviv
  - Russia won both the gold and overall medal tallies.
- May 19 & 20: 2018 Kata European Judo Championships in (Slovenia) Koper
  - France won the gold medal tally. Italy won the overall medal tally.
- July 18: 2018 European Mixed Team Judo Championships in (Russia) Yekaterinburg
  - France won both the gold and overall medal tallies.
- September 20 – 27: 2018 World Judo Championships in (Azerbaijan) Baku
  - Japan won both the gold and overall medal tallies.

=== 2018 Grand Slam ===
- February 10 & 11: Grand Slam #1 in (France) Paris
  - Japan won both the gold and overall medal tallies.
- February 23 – 25: Grand Slam #2 in (Germany) Düsseldorf
  - Japan won both the gold and overall medal tallies.
- March 17 & 18: Grand Slam #3 in (Russia) Yekaterinburg
  - Japan won both the gold and overall medal tallies.
- October 27 – 29: Grand Slam #4 in (United Arab Emirates) Abu Dhabi
  - Georgia won the gold medal tally. Israel won the overall medal tally.
- November 23 – 25: Grand Slam #5 (final) in Osaka
  - Japan won both the gold and overall medal tallies.

=== 2018 Grand Prix ===
- January 19 – 21: GP #1 in (Tunisia) Tunis
  - Kazakhstan and Ukraine won 2 gold medals each. Japan won the overall medal tally.
- March 9 – 11: GP #2 in (Morocco) Agadir
  - Russia won both the gold and overall medal tallies.
- March 30 – April 1: GP #3 in (Georgia (country)) Tbilisi
  - Georgia and France won 5 gold medals each. Georgia won the overall medal tally.
- April 6 – 8: GP #4 in (Turkey) Antalya
  - Kosovo won the gold medal tally. Russia won the overall medal tally.
- May 25 – 27: GP #5 in (China) Hohhot
  - Japan won both the gold and overall medal tallies.
- July 27 – 29: GP #6 in (Croatia) Zagreb
  - Japan won both the gold and overall medal tallies.
- August 10 – 12: GP #7 in (Hungary) Budapest
  - Japan won both the gold and overall medal tallies.
- October 12 – 14: GP #8 in (Mexico) Cancún
  - Russia, Austria, and Cuba won 2 gold medals each. Brazil won the overall medal tally.
- November 9 – 11: GP #9 in (Uzbekistan) Tashkent
  - Kosovo and Azerbaijan won 3 gold medals each. Germany won the overall medal tally.
- November 16 – 18: GP #10 (final) in The Hague
  - Ukraine and Russia won 2 gold medals each. The Netherlands won the overall medal tally.

=== 2018 European Open ===
- February 3 & 4: European Open #1 in (Portugal) Odivelas (W) & (Bulgaria) Sofia (M)
  - Men: Russia won both the gold and overall medal tallies.
  - Women: Japan and Canada won 2 gold medals each. Spain won the overall medal tally.
- February 17 & 18: European Open #2 in Rome (W) & (Austria) Oberwart (M)
  - Men: Azerbaijan and Georgia won 2 gold medals each. Azerbaijan won the overall medal tally.
  - Women: Japan won the gold medal tally. Italy won the overall medal tally.
- March 3 & 4: European Open #3 in Warsaw (W) & (Czech Republic) Prague (M)
  - Men: Belarus won both the gold and overall medal tallies.
  - Women: Poland won both the gold and overall medal tallies.
- June 2 & 3: European Open #4 in Madrid (M & W)
  - Germany and France won 3 gold medals each. Spain won the overall medal tally.
- August 18 & 19: European Open #5 in Minsk (M & W)
  - Belarus won the gold medal tally. Russia won the overall medal tally.
- October 6 & 7: European Open #6 (final) in (United Kingdom) Glasgow (M & W)
  - France won both the gold and overall medal tallies.

=== 2018 European Cup ===
- March 10 & 11: European Cup #1 in (Switzerland) Uster-Zürich
  - France won both the gold and overall medal tallies.
- April 7 & 8: European Cup #2 in (Croatia) Dubrovnik
  - France won both the gold and overall medal tallies.
- May 5 & 6: European Cup #3 in (Bosnia and Herzegovina) Sarajevo
  - France won both the gold and overall medal tallies.
- May 12 & 13: European Cup #4 in Orenburg
  - Russia won both the gold and overall medal tallies.
- June 9 & 10: European Cup #5 in Belgrade
  - Serbia won both the gold and overall medal tallies.
- June 23 & 24: European Cup #6 in (Slovenia) Celje-Podčetrtek
  - Russia and France won 4 gold medals each. Germany won the overall medal tally.
- July 14 & 15: European Cup #7 in (Germany) Saarbrücken
  - Russia won the gold medal tally. France won the overall medal tally.
- September 1 & 2: European Cup #8 in (Slovakia) Bratislava
  - Russia won both the gold and overall medal tallies.
- October 27 & 28: European Cup #9 (final) in (Spain) Málaga
  - France won both the gold and overall medal tallies.

=== 2018 EJU Kata Tournaments ===
- February 25: 2018 EJU Kata Tournament #1 in Brussels
  - Nage No Kata winners: Netherlands (Erik Faes & Niels Neumann)
  - Ju No Kata winners: Italy (Giovanni Tarabelli & Angelica Tarabelli)
  - Katame No Kata winners: Belgium (Nicolas Gilon & Jean-Philippe Gilon)
  - Kime No Kata winners: France (Michel Jeuffroy & Laurent Jeuffroy)
  - Goshin Jutsu winners: Italy (Ubaldo Volpi & Maurizio Calderini)
- March 24: 2018 EJU Kata Tournament #2 in Pordenone
  - Nage No Kata winners: Italy (Mauro Collini & Tommaso Rondini)
  - Katame No Kata winners: France (Nicolas Fourmaux & Jean-Daniel Nguyen)
  - Ju No Kata winners: Germany (Wolfgang Daxromswinkel & Ulla Loosen)
  - Kime No Kata winners: France (Michel Jeuffroy & Laurent Jeuffroy)
  - Goshin Jutsu winners: Italy (Ubaldo Volpi & Maurizio Calderini)
- April 29: 2018 EJU Kata Tournament #3 (final) in Tours
  - Nage No Kata winners: Belgium (Nicolas Gilon & Jean-Philippe Gilon)
  - Katame No Kata winners: Belgium (Nicolas Gilon & Jean-Philippe Gilon)
  - Ju No Kata winners: France (Emmanuel Wirtz & Armelle Voindrot)
  - Kime No Kata winners: France (Michel Jeuffroy & Laurent Jeuffroy)
  - Goshin Jutsu winners: France (Kamel Ben Tekfa & Alexis Lacroix)

=== 2018 Pan American Open ===
- March 10 & 11: Pan American Open #1 in (Chile) Santiago
  - Ecuador and Brazil won 3 gold medals each. Argentina won the overall medal tally.
- March 17 & 18: Pan American Open #2 in (Peru) Lima
  - Brazil won both the gold and overall medal tallies.
- March 24 & 25: Pan American Open #3 in Buenos Aires
  - Brazil won the gold medal tally. Argentina won the overall medal tally.
- September 1 & 2: Pan American Open #4 (final) in Santo Domingo
  - Dominican Republic won both the gold and overall medal tallies.

=== 2018 Asian Open ===
- July 7 & 8: Asian Open #1 in (Chinese Taipei) Taipei
  - South Korea and Japan won 5 gold medals each. South Korea won the overall medal tally.
- November 3 & 4: Asian Open #2 in Aktau
  - Kazakhstan won both the gold and overall medal tallies.
- December 1 & 2: Asian Open #3 (final) in Hong Kong
  - China won both the gold and overall medal tallies.

=== 2018 African Open ===
- November 17 & 18: African Open #1 in (Senegal) Dakar
  - Algeria won both the gold and overall medal tallies.
- November 24 & 25: African Open #2 (final) in Yaoundé
  - Algeria won the gold medal tally. Cameroon won the overall medal tally.

=== 2018 Oceania Open ===
- November 17 & 18: Oceania Open in Perth
  - Australia won both the gold and overall medal tallies.

== Karate ==
=== World & Continental Karate Events ===
- February 2 – 4: 45th EKF Junior, Cadet & U21 Championships in Sochi
  - Italy, Russia, and Spain won 5 gold medals each. Turkey won the overall medal tally.
- May 10 – 13: 53rd EKF Senior Championships in (Serbia) Novi Sad
  - Spain and Turkey won 3 gold medals each. Italy won the overall medal tally.
- May 10 – 13: 17th AKF Cadet, Junior & U21 Championships in Okinawa
  - Japan won both the gold and overall medal tallies.
- May 18 – 20: 18th OKF Cadet, Junior & U21 Championships in (New Zealand) Auckland
  - Australia won both the gold and overall medal tallies.
- June 15 – 17: 32nd PKF Senior Championships in (Chile) Santiago
  - United States won both the gold and overall medal tallies.
- July 11 – 15: 15th AKF Senior Championships in (Jordan) Amman
  - Japan won both the gold and overall medal tallies.
- July 19 – 22: 11th World University Karate Championship in Kobe
  - Japan won both the gold and overall medal tallies.
- August 22 – 25: PKF Cadet, Junior & U21 Championships in Rio de Janeiro
  - Brazil won both the gold and overall medal tallies.
- August 31 – September 2: UFAK Senior Championships in (Rwanda) Kigali
  - Egypt won both the gold and overall medal tallies.
- November 6 – 11: 24th WKF Senior Championships in (Spain) Madrid
  - Japan won both the gold and overall medal tallies.

=== WKF Premier League ===
- January 26 – 28: Karate 1-Premier League #1 in Paris
  - Japan won the gold medal tally. France won the overall medal tally.
- February 16 – 18: Karate 1-Premier League #2 in (United Arab Emirates) Dubai
  - Turkey won the gold medal tally. Turkey and Iran won 6 overall medals each.
- March 16 – 18: Karate 1-Premier League #3 in (Netherlands) Rotterdam
  - Japan won the gold medal tally. Turkey won the overall medal tally.
- April 6 – 8: Karate 1-Premier League #4 in (Morocco) Rabat
  - Turkey, France, and Egypt won 2 gold medals each. Turkey won the overall medal tally.
- June 8 – 10: Karate 1-Premier League #5 in (Turkey) Istanbul
  - Iran won both the gold and overall medal tallies.
- September 14 – 16: Karate 1-Premier League #6 in (Germany) Berlin
  - Japan won both the gold and overall medal tallies.
- October 12 – 14: Karate 1-Premier League #7 (final) in Tokyo
  - Japan won both the gold and overall medal tallies.

=== WKF Series A ===
- February 9 – 11: Karate 1 - Series A #1 in (Spain) Guadalajara
  - Japan won both the gold and overall medal tallies.
- March 2 – 4: Karate 1 - Series A #2 in (Austria) Salzburg
  - Japan won both the gold and overall medal tallies.
- September 21 – 23: Karate 1 - Series A #3 in (Chile) Santiago
  - Turkey won both the gold and overall medal tallies.
- December 7 – 9: Karate 1 - Series A #4 (final) in (China) Shanghai
  - Spain won the gold medal tally. Japan won the overall medal tally.

=== WKF Youth League ===
- May 25 – 27: Karate 1 - Youth League #1 in (Bulgaria) Sofia
  - Cadet: Russia and Switzerland won 2 gold medals each. Russia won the overall medal tally.
  - Junior: Japan and Slovakia won 2 gold medals each. Japan won the overall medal tally.
  - U14: Ukraine won both the gold and overall medal tallies.
- July 6 – 8: Karate 1 - Youth League #2 in Umag
  - Cadet: Russia, Bosnia and Herzegovina, and Croatia won 2 gold medals each. Russia won the overall medal tally.
  - Junior: Russia won both the gold and overall medal tallies.
  - U14: Russia won both the gold and overall medal tallies.
- October 26 – 28: Karate 1 - Youth League #3 in Cancún
  - Cadet: Russia won the gold medal tally. Mexico won the overall medal tally.
  - Junior: Mexico won the gold medal tally. United States won the overall medal tally.
  - U14: Mexico and United States won 3 gold medals each. Mexico won the overall medal tally.
- December 14 – 16: Karate 1 - Youth League #4 (final) in Caorle
  - Cadet: Russia, Slovakia, and Azerbaijan won 2 gold medals each. Russia won the overall medal tally.
  - Junior: France won the gold medal tally. Italy won the overall medal tally.
  - U14: Ukraine won the gold medal tally. Italy won the overall medal tally.

== Mixed martial arts ==
=== International mixed martial arts championships ===
- March 16 – 18: 2018 IMMAF Oceania Open Championships in (Australia) Melbourne
  - Men's Lightweight winner: (Australia) Jordan Thomas
  - Men's Welterweight winner: (United States) Darian Weeks
  - Men's Middleweight winner: (Australia) Joseph Luciano
  - Men's Featherweight winner: (Japan) Kohei Maeda
  - Men's Lightweight winner: (Japan) Teruhiko Kato
  - Men's Welterweight winner: (United States) Darian Weeks
  - Men's Bantamweight winner: (Australia) Reo Yamaguchi
  - Women's Bantamweight winner: (Australia) Amber Thompson
  - Women's Flyweight winner: (New Zealand) Anne Wilson
  - Women's Bantamweight winner: (Australia) Amber Thompson
- March 23 – 26: World Amateur Junior and Youth MMA Championships in (Russia) Saint Petersburg
- May 24 – 26: 2018 IMMAF Africa Open Championships in (South Africa) Johannesburg
- June 17 – 23: 2018 IMMAF European Championships and European Youth Open in (Romania) Bucharest
- September 3 – 8: 2018 IMMAF Asian Open and Junior MMA World Championships in (China) Beijing

== Muay Thai ==
- May 10 – 19: 2018 IFMA World Championships in (Mexico) Cancún
- June 29 – July 8: 2018 European Championships in (Czech Republic) Prague
- July 23 – 29: 1st World University Muaythai Championship in (Thailand) Pattaya
- August 3 – 11: 2018 Youth World Championships in (Thailand) Bangkok
- October 26 – 29: 2018 Pan American Championships in (Mexico) Acapulco
- December 3 – 11: 2018 Asian Championships in Macau

== Sambo ==
=== World and Continental Championships ===
- April 11 & 12: Southeast Asian SAMBO Championships (M&W, Combat Sambo) in Jakarta
  - Indonesia won both the gold and overall medal tallies.
- April 13 – 15: 2018 European Youth and Junior Championships in (Czech Republic) Prague
  - Russia won both the gold and overall medal tallies.
- May 11 – 13: 2018 Asian Sambo Championships & Asian Youth and Junior Championships in (Mongolia) Ulaanbaatar
  - Uzbekistan won both the gold and overall medal tallies.
- May 18 – 20: European Sambo Championships in (Greece) Athens
  - Russia won both the gold and overall medal tallies.
- June 23 & 25: African Sambo Championships in (Tunisia) Tunis
- July 21 & 22: Pan American Sambo Championships in (Mexico) Acapulco
- August 23 & 24: World Schools Sambo Championships in (Russia) Oryol
- September 28: European Union Sambo Cup in (Latvia) Riga
- October 12 – 14: World Youth & Junior Sambo Championships in (Georgia (country)) Tbilisi
- October 20 & 21: World Masters Sambo Championships in Morocco
- November 9 – 11: World Sambo Championships in (Romania) Bucharest
- December 6 & 7: World Cadets Sambo Championships in (Serbia) Novi Sad
- December 7 – 9: 2nd World University Sambo Championships in (Serbia) Novi Sad
- December 16: European Sambo Cup in (Spain) Madrid

=== World Cup ===
- March 23 & 24: WC (A. Kharlampiev Memorial) #1 in Moscow
  - Russia won both the gold and overall medal tallies.

== Taekwondo ==
=== International Taekwondo championships ===
- February 6 – 9: 2018 European Clubs Taekwondo Championships in Istanbul
  - Turkey won both the gold and overall medal tallies.
- March 29 & 30: 2018 African Taekwondo Championships in Agadir
  - Morocco won both the gold and overall medal tallies.
- March 31: 2018 President's Cup - African Region in (Morocco) Agadir
  - Russia won the gold medal tally. Spain won the overall medal tally.
- April 9 – 13: 2018 World Taekwondo Junior Championships in (Tunisia) Hammamet
  - Iran won both the gold and overall medal tallies.
- April 23 & 24: 2018 Asian Taekwondo Club Championships in Karaj
  - Iran won all the gold medals and the overall medal tally.
- April 25 – 28: 2018 World Taekwondo Beach Championships in (Greece) Rhodes
  - Recognized Poomsae
  - Under 17 winners: (Italy) Michelangelo Sampognaro (m) / (Denmark) Eva Sandersen (f)
  - Under 30 (Age 18-30) winners: (Finland) Frans Salmi (m) / (Turkey) Kubra Dagli (f)
  - Under 30 (Age 31 and up) winners: (Qatar) Othman Boularas (m) / (United Kingdom) LI Wenqi (f)
  - Pair Under 17 winners: Thailand (Kanokchanok Jareonying & Pattarapong Sengmueang)
  - Pair Under 30 (Age 18-30) winners: Denmark (Annaline Soeberg & Benjamin Harder)
  - Pair Over 30 (Age 31 and up) winners: Denmark (Lisa Lents & Kim Nedergaard)
  - Team Under 17 winners: Thailand (m) / Thailand (f)
  - Team Over 17 winners: Finland (m) / Denmark (f)
  - Freestyle Poomsae
  - Under 17 (Age 15-17) winners: (Thailand) Thanaphat Bompenthomnumsuk (m) / (Russia) Anastasiia Sumenkova (f)
  - Over 17 (Age 18 and up) winners: (Finland) Christian Kamphuis (m) / (Netherlands) Soraya Wahjudi (f)
  - Pair Over 17 winners: Spain (Sandra Gardini Gallo & Adrian Alonso Simon)
  - Team winners: Thailand
  - Technical Breaking
  - Jumping Multiple Kick winner: (South Korea) SEO Jae-won
  - Spinning Kick winner: (South Korea) JANG Jong-pil
  - Free Style Breaking winner: (South Korea) KIM Min-song
  - High Kick Performance winners: (Turkey) Kübra Dağlı (f) / (South Korea) PARK Seung-jin (f)
  - Free Style Dynamic Kicks & Breaking Challenge
  - Winners: (South Korea) LEE Chan-min (m) / (South Korea) CHOE Han-na (f)
- April 25 – 29: 2018 President's Cup - European Region in (Greece) Athens
  - Russia won both the gold and overall medal tallies.
- May 10 – 13: 2018 European Taekwondo Championships in Kazan
  - Russia won both the gold and overall medal tallies.
- May 26 – 28: 2018 Asian Taekwondo Championships in (Vietnam) Ho Chi Minh City
  - South Korea won both the gold and overall medal tallies.
- May 31 – June 10: 2018 World Taekwondo Europe Open Multi European Games in (Bulgaria) Plovdiv
  - Senior: Turkey and Russia won 3 gold medals each. Turkey won the overall medal tally.
  - Junior: Greece and Turkey won 5 gold medals each. Greece won the overall medal tally.
  - Cadet: Turkey won both the gold and overall medal tallies.
- June 1 – 3: 2018 Rome World Taekwondo Grand-Prix in Italy
  - Russia won the gold medal tally. South Korea won the overall medal tally.
- July 5 – 8: 2018 El Hassan Cup International Open in Amman
  - Jordan won both the gold and overall medal tallies.
- July 13 – 15: 2018 Pan Am Taekwondo Championships in (United States) Spokane, Washington
  - Mexico won the gold medal tally. Brazil won the overall medal tally.
- July 27 – 29: 2018 World Taekwondo World Cup Team Championships in Wuxi
  - Men's winners: South Korea
  - Women's winners: China
  - Mixed winners: Russia
- August 3: 2018 President's Cup - Oceania Region in (French Polynesia) Mahina
  - Australia won both the gold and overall medal tallies.
- August 5: 2018 Oceania Taekwondo Championships in Mahina
  - Senior: Australia won all the gold medals and won the overall medal tally, too.
  - Junior: French Polynesia won both the gold and overall medal tallies.
- August 10 – 12: 2018 Moscow World Taekwondo Grand-Prix in Russia
  - South Korea won both the gold and overall medal tallies.
- August 11 – 15: 2018 Kimunyong Cup International Open Taekwondo Championships in Seoul
  - South Korea won both the gold and overall medal tallies.
- September 7 – 9: 2018 Asian Taekwondo Open Championships in Atyrau (debut event)
  - Uzbekistan won the gold medal tally. Kazakhstan won the overall medal tally.
- September 19 – 21: Taoyuan 2018 World Taekwondo Grand-Prix in Chinese Taipei
  - South Korea won both the gold and overall medal tallies.
- October 12 – 14: 2018 President's Cup - Pan American Region in Las Vegas
  - Mexico won the gold medal tally. United States won the overall medal tally.
- October 19 – 21: 2018 Manchester World Taekwondo Grand-Prix in Great Britain
  - Great Britain won both the gold and overall medal tallies.
- November 11 – 13: 2018 President's Cup - Asian Region in Taipei
  - Senior: South Korea won the gold medal tally. Chinese Taipei won the overall medal tally.
  - Junior: Chinese Taipei won both the gold and overall medal tallies.
  - Cadet: Chinese Taipei won both the gold and overall medal tallies.
- November 22 & 23: 2018 World Taekwondo Grand-Prix Final in (United Arab Emirates) Fujairah
  - South Korea won both the gold and overall medal tallies.
- November 24 & 25: 2018 World Taekwondo Team Championships in (United Arab Emirates) Fujairah
  - Men -> Champions: Iran; Second: Russia; Third: Azerbaijan & Kazakhstan
  - Women -> Champions: China; Second: Ivory Coast; Third: France & Russia
  - Mixed -> Champions: Russia; Second: Turkey; Third: Ivory Coast & Kazakhstan
- December 9 – 16: 2018 World Taekwondo Grand Slam Series in Wuxi
  - China and Great Britain won 2 gold medals each. South Korea won the overall medal tally.

=== 2018 WTF Open ===
- February 10 – 14: Turkish Open in Istanbul
  - Turkey won both the gold and overall medal tallies.
- February 16 – 18: Fujairah Open in the United Arab Emirates
  - Kazakhstan won the gold medal tally. The United Arab Emirates won the overall medal tally.
- February 24 & 25: Slovenia Open in Maribor
  - Croatia and Poland won 4 gold medals each. Croatia won the overall medal tally.
- February 24 & 25: Egypt Open in Alexandria
  - Turkey won the gold medal tally. Italy won the overall medal tally.
- March 1 – 4: Malaysia Open in Kuala Lumpur
  - Malaysia won both the gold and overall medal tallies.
- March 3 & 4: Sofia Open in Bulgaria
  - Turkey won the gold medal tally. Great Britain won the overall medal tally.
- March 8 – 11: Mexico Open in Monterrey
  - Mexico won both the gold and overall medal tallies.
- March 10 & 11: Dutch Open in (Netherlands) Eindhoven
  - South Korea won the gold medal tally. Russia won the overall medal tally.
- March 16 – 18: Belgian Open in (Belgium) Lommel
  - Turkey and South Korea won 3 gold medals each. France won the overall medal tally.
- March 16 – 18: Ukraine Open in Kharkiv
  - Kazakhstan won both the gold and overall medal tallies.
- March 25: Spanish Open in (Spain) Alicante
  - Russia won both the gold and overall medal tallies.
- April 7 & 8: German Open in Hamburg
  - Germany won both the gold and overall medal tallies.
- April 21 & 22: Fajr Open in Karaj
  - Iran won all the gold medals and the overall medal tally.
- May 26 & 27: Austrian Open in (Austria) Innsbruck
  - Croatia won both the gold and overall medal tallies.
- June 16 & 17: LuxOpen in Luxembourg City
  - Spain won both the gold and overall medal tallies.
- July 18 – 24: Korea Open in Jeju City
  - South Korea won both the gold and overall medal tallies.
- August 3 – 5: Argentina Open in Buenos Aires
  - Brazil won both the gold and overall medal tallies.
- August 30 – September 2: Costa Rica Open in San José
  - Brazil won the gold medal tally. United States won the overall medal tally.
- September 3 – 6: Russia Open in Moscow
  - Russia won both the gold and overall medal tallies.
- September 6 – 8: Palestinian Open in Ramallah
  - Senior: Turkey won the gold medal tally. Palestine won the overall medal tally.
  - Junior: Palestine won both the gold and overall medal tallies.
  - Cadet: Palestine won both the gold and overall medal tallies.
- September 13 – 16: Canada Open in Richmond
  - Canada won the gold medal tally. United States won the overall medal tally.
- September 14 – 16: Polish Open Cup in (Poland) Warsaw
  - Croatia and Serbia won 4 gold medals each. Croatia won the overall medal tally.
- September 21 – 23: Lebanon Open in Beirut
  - Iran won the gold medal tally. Lebanon won the overall medal tally.
- October 6 & 7: Riga Open in Latvia
  - Senior: Russia won both the gold and overall medal tallies.
  - Junior: Russia won both the gold and overall medal tallies.
  - Cadet: Russia won both the gold and overall medal tallies.
- October 19 – 21: Greek Open in Athens
  - Greece won both the gold and overall medal tallies.
- October 27 & 28: Serbian Open in (Serbia) Belgrade
  - Spain won both the gold and overall medal tallies.
- November 10 & 11: Croatia Open in Zagreb
  - Croatia and Serbia won 4 gold medals each. Croatia won the overall medal tally.
- November 24 & 25: Israel Open in Ramla
  - Senior: France and Russia won 4 gold medals each. France and Greece won 10 overall medals each.
  - Junior: Israel, Russia, and Cyprus won 3 gold medals each. Israel won the overall medal tally.
  - Cadet: Israel won both the gold and overall medal tallies.

== Wrestling ==
=== World wrestling championships ===
- May 14 – 20: 2018 World Military Wrestling Championships in Moscow
  - Men's Freestyle: Russia won both the gold and overall medal tallies.
  - Women's Freestyle: China won both the gold and overall medal tallies.
  - Greco-Roman: Russia won both the gold and overall medal tallies.
- July 2 – 8: 2018 World Cadet Wrestling Championships in (Croatia) Zagreb
  - Cadet Men's Freestyle: Iran won both the gold and overall medal tallies.
  - Cadet Women's Freestyle: Japan won both the gold and overall medal tallies.
  - Cadet Greco-Roman: Iran, Russia, Uzbekistan, & Turkey won 2 gold medals each. Iran won the overall medal tally.
- September 5 – 9: 2018 World University Wrestling Championships in (Brazil) Goiana
  - Men's Freestyle: Japan, Turkey, & Russia won 3 gold medals each. Japan won the overall medal tally.
  - Women's Freestyle: Canada won both the gold and overall medal tallies.
  - Greco-Roman: Turkey won both the gold and overall medal tallies.
- September 17 – 23: 2018 World Junior Wrestling Championships in (Slovakia) Trnava
  - Junior Men's Freestyle: Russia won both the gold and overall medal tallies.
  - Junior Women's Freestyle: Japan won both the gold and overall medal tallies.
  - Junior Greco-Roman: Iran won the gold medal tally. Russia won the overall medal tally.
- September 28 – 30: 2018 World Veterans Wrestling Championships (Men's Freestyle) in (North Macedonia) Skopje
  - Russia won both the gold and overall medal tallies.
- October 5 – 7: 2018 World Veterans Wrestling Championships (Greco-Roman) in Perm
  - Russia won both the gold and overall medal tallies.
- October 20 – 28: 2018 World Wrestling Championships in (Hungary) Budapest
  - Russia won both the gold and overall medal tallies.
- November 12 – 18: 2018 U23 World Wrestling Championships in (Romania) Bucharest
  - Men's U23 Freestyle: Georgia won the gold medal tally. Russia won the overall medal tally.
  - Women's U23 Freestyle: Japan won both the gold and overall medal tallies.
  - U23 Greco-Roman: Georgia won both the gold and overall medal tallies.

=== Wrestling World Cup ===
- March 17 & 18: 2018 Women's Freestyle World Cup in Takasaki, Gunma
  - Champions: Japan; Second: China; Third: Mongolia
- April 7 & 8: 2018 Men's Freestyle World Cup in Iowa City, Iowa
  - Champions: United States; Second: Azerbaijan; Third: Japan
- December 13 & 14: 2018 World Men's Wrestling Clubs Cup (Freestyle) in Babol
  - Champions: Iran #1; Second: Turkey; Third: Iran #2
- December 20 & 21: 2018 World Men's Wrestling Clubs Cup (Greco-Roman) in (Iran) Ardabil
  - Champions: (Iran) Bimeh Razi Ardabil; Second: Russia; Third: (Iran) Sina Sanat Izeh

=== Wrestling Grand Prix ===
- February 3: 2018 Grand Prix of Croatia in Zagreb
  - Greco-Roman: Hungary, Belarus, Turkey, and Romania won 2 gold medals each. Hungary won the overall medal tally.
- June 23 & 24: 2018 Grand Prix of Hungary in Győr
  - Greco-Roman: Kazakhstan won the gold medal tally. Hungary won the overall medal tally.
- July 14 & 15: 2018 Grand Prix of Spain in Madrid
  - Men's Freestyle: Spain and Russia won 2 gold medals each. Spain won the overall medal tally.
  - Women's Freestyle: United States won both the gold and overall medal tallies.
  - Greco-Roman: Russia won both the gold and overall medal tallies.
- August 18 & 19: 2018 Grand Prix of Germany in Dortmund
  - Greco-Roman: Hungary won both the gold and overall medal tallies.

=== Continental wrestling championships ===
- February 7 – 11: 2018 African Wrestling Championships (Senior, Junior, & Cadet) in Port Harcourt
  - Men's Freestyle: Nigeria won both the gold and overall medal tallies.
  - Women's Freestyle: Nigeria won both the gold and overall medal tallies.
  - Greco-Roman: Algeria won the gold medal tally. Egypt won the overall medal tally.
  - Junior Men's Freestyle: Nigeria, Algeria, and Egypt won 3 gold medals each. Nigeria won the overall medal tally.
  - Junior Women's Freestyle: Tunisia won the gold medal tally. Tunisia and Nigeria won 8 overall medals each.
  - Junior Greco-Roman: Egypt won the gold medal tally. Egypt and Nigeria won 8 overall medals each.
  - Cadet Men's Freestyle: Egypt won the gold medal tally. South Africa and Nigeria won 6 overall medals each.
  - Cadet Women's Freestyle: Nigeria won both the gold and overall medal tallies.
  - Cadet Greco-Roman: Algeria and Tunisia won 3 gold medals each. Egypt won the overall medal tally.
- February 27 – March 4: 2018 Asian Wrestling Championships in Bishkek
  - Men's Freestyle: Uzbekistan and Iran won 3 gold medals each. Uzbekistan won the overall medal tally.
  - Women's Freestyle: China won the gold medal tally. Mongolia won the overall medal tally.
  - Greco-Roman: Iran won the gold medal tally. Kyrgyzstan won the overall medal tally.
- March 20 – 25: 2018 Central American and Caribbean Wrestling Championship in Havana
  - Men's Freestyle: Cuba won all the gold medals and the overall medal tally.
  - Women's Freestyle: Colombia won the gold medal tally. Cuba won the overall medal tally.
  - Greco-Roman: Cuba won both the gold and overall medal tallies.
- March 29 – 31: 2018 Mediterranean Wrestling Championship in Algiers
  - Men's Freestyle: Tunisia won the gold medal tally. Algeria won the overall medal tally.
  - Women's Freestyle: Tunisia won the gold medal tally. Tunisia and Algeria won 7 overall medals each.
  - Greco-Roman: Algeria won both the gold and overall medal tallies.
  - Junior Men's Freestyle: Algeria won both the gold and overall medal tallies.
  - Junior Women's Freestyle: Tunisia won the gold medal tally. Algeria won the overall medal tally.
  - Junior Greco-Roman: Algeria won both the gold and overall medal tallies.
  - Cadet Men's Freestyle: Algeria won both the gold and overall medal tallies.
  - Cadet Women's Freestyle: Algeria won both the gold and overall medal tallies.
  - Cadet Greco-Roman: Algeria and Egypt won 3 gold medals each. Algeria won the overall medal tally.
- April 20 & 21: 2018 Arab Cadet Wrestling Championship in Baghdad
  - Cadet Men's Freestyle: Iraq won both the gold and overall medal tallies.
  - Cadet Greco-Roman: Iraq won both the gold and overall medal tallies.
- April 30 – May 6: 2018 European Wrestling Championships in Kaspiysk
  - Men's Freestyle: Russia won the gold medal tally. Russia and Azerbaijan won 8 overall medals each.
  - Women's Freestyle: Russia, Bulgaria, and Turkey won 2 gold medals each. Russia won the overall medal tally.
  - Greco-Roman: Russia won both the gold and overall medal tallies.
- May 3 – 6: 2018 Pan American Wrestling Championships in (Peru) Lima
  - Men's Freestyle: United States won both the gold and overall medal tallies.
  - Women's Freestyle: United States won both the gold and overall medal tallies.
  - Greco-Roman: Cuba won the gold medal tally. Cuba and the United States won 6 overall medals each.
- May 10 – 13: 2018 Asian Cadet Wrestling Championships in Tashkent
  - Cadet Men's Freestyle: Iran won the gold medal tally. Iran and Kazakhstan won 8 overall medals each.
  - Cadet Women's Freestyle: Japan won both the gold and overall medal tallies.
  - Cadet Greco-Roman: Iran won the gold medal tally. Iran and Uzbekistan won 7 overall medals each.
- May 14 – 20: 2018 European Cadet Wrestling Championships in (North Macedonia) Skopje
  - Cadet Men's Freestyle: Russia won both the gold and overall medal tallies.
  - Cadet Women's Freestyle: Ukraine won both the gold and overall medal tallies.
  - Cadet Greco-Roman: Russia won both the gold and overall medal tallies.
- May 18 – 20: 2018 Oceania Wrestling Championships (Senior, Junior, & Cadet) in Yigo
  - Men's Freestyle: Guam won the gold medal tally. Federated States of Micronesia won the overall medal tally.
  - Women's Freestyle: All events (except the 55 kg event) were won by default.
  - Greco-Roman: Palau won the gold medal tally. Federated States of Micronesia won the overall medal tally.
  - Junior Men's Freestyle: American Samoa, New Zealand, & Guam won 2 gold medals each. American Samoa won the overall medal tally.
  - Junior Women's Freestyle: All events here were won by default.
  - Junior Greco-Roman: American Samoa, New Zealand, & Federated States of Micronesia won 2 gold medals each. American Samoa won the overall medal tally.
  - Cadet Men's Freestyle: New Zealand won the gold medal tally. New Zealand and American Samoa won 4 overall medals each.
  - Cadet Women's Freestyle: All individual women's wrestlers here won a gold medal by default.
  - Cadet Greco-Roman: American Samoa won both the gold and overall medal tallies.
- May 19: 2018 Nordic Senior Wrestling Championships in Västerås
  - Men's Freestyle: Sweden and Latvia won 2 gold medals each. Finland won the overall medal tally.
  - Women's Freestyle: Sweden won both the gold and overall medal tallies.
  - Greco-Roman: Finland won both the gold and overall medal tallies.
- May 25 – 27: 2018 Pan American Cadet Wrestling Championships in Guatemala City
  - Cadet Men's Freestyle: United States won both the gold and overall medal tallies.
  - Cadet Women's Freestyle: United States won both the gold and overall medal tallies.
  - Cadet Greco-Roman: United States won both the gold and overall medal tallies.
- May 26 & 27: 2018 Nordic Junior and Cadet Wrestling Championships in Kajaani
  - Note: There were no junior freestyle events in this championship.
  - Junior Greco-Roman: Estonia won the gold medal tally. Estonia and Finland won 7 overall medals each.
  - Cadet Men's Freestyle: Finland won both the gold and overall medal tallies.
  - Cadet Women's Freestyle: Norway won the gold medal tally. Sweden won the overall medal tally.
  - Cadet Greco-Roman: Denmark won the gold medal tally. Finland won the overall medal tally.
- June 4 – 10: 2018 European U23 Wrestling Championships in Istanbul
  - Men's Freestyle: Russia won both the gold and overall medal tallies.
  - Women's Freestyle: Russia and Ukraine won 3 gold and 6 overall medals each.
  - Greco-Roman: Russia and Georgia won 3 gold medals each. Russia and Turkey won 7 overall medals each.
- July 17 – 22: 2018 Asian Junior Wrestling Championships in (India) New Delhi
  - Junior Men's Freestyle: Iran won both the gold and overall medal tallies.
  - Junior Women's Freestyle: Japan won the gold medal tally. China won the overall medal tally.
  - Junior Greco-Roman: Iran won both the gold and overall medal tallies.
- July 25 & 26: 2018 Arab Senior Wrestling Championships in Sharm El Sheikh
  - Men's Freestyle: Egypt won both the gold and overall medal tallies.
  - Greco-Roman: Egypt won all the gold medals and won the overall medal tally, too.
- July 30 – August 5: 2018 European Junior Wrestling Championships in (Italy) Rome
  - Junior Men's Freestyle: Russia won the gold medal tally. Azerbaijan won the overall medal tally.
  - Junior Women's Freestyle: Russia won both the gold and overall medal tallies.
  - Junior Greco-Roman: Russia won both the gold and overall medal tallies.
- August 17 – 19: 2018 Pan American Junior Wrestling Championships in (Brazil) Fortaleza
  - Junior Men's Freestyle: United States won both the gold and overall medal tallies.
  - Junior Women's Freestyle: Mexico and Canada won 3 gold medals each. Mexico and United States won 7 overall medals each.
  - Junior Greco-Roman: United States won the gold medal tally. The United States and Mexico won 7 overall medals each.
- November 1 – 4: 2018 Balkan Junior Wrestling Championships in (Albania) Tirana
  - Junior Men's Freestyle: Turkey won both the gold and overall medal tallies.
  - Junior Women's Freestyle: Turkey won all the gold medals and the overall medal tally, too.
  - Junior Greco-Roman: Turkey won both the gold and overall medal tallies.

== Wushu ==
- August 2 – 5: 2018 World University Wushu Championship in Macau (debut event)
  - China won the gold medal tally. China and Malaysia won 8 overall medals each.
