= Karate in India =

- Country: India
- National team: India

International competitions
- Asian Karate Championships; Karate World Championships

Karate is one of the most popular and practiced martial arts in India. Because of Its simplicity & incredibly fast application time. Karate originated in the island of Okinawa with the influence of Chinese martial arts. Karate is a striking based martial art, which includes punches, blocks, kicks and open hand strikes. It does not require full contact sparring like boxing and MMA. This makes it safer for children. These factors contributes the growth of Karate world wide.

== History ==
Karate grew in popularity in India in the 1970s and 1980s, with many dojos first established in major cities.

Karate India Organization (KIO) is the World Karate Federation recognised body for karate in India. KIO has 40 affiliated units with 29 state teams, 7 union territory teams along with Services, ITBP, Assam rifles, Jain University etc has associate members. Even then the Indian karate team couldn't take part in the first ever competition of Karate at the Summer Olympics due to the disputes from the office bearers of the governing body of Karate in India.
