= Karate1 Youth League =

Global series of karate tournaments

- Current event or competition: 2026 Karate1 Youth League

Competition details
- Discipline: Karate
- Organiser: World Karate Federation (WKF)

History
- First edition: 2018

The Karate1 Youth League is a global series of karate tournaments established by the World Karate Federation.

The league was created to provide a structured, high level competitive platform for young athletes in the Under-14, Cadet, and Junior age categories. It serves as a developmental pathway toward senior level events, particularly the Karate1 Premier League.
