= Commonwealth Karate Championships =

Karate competition

The Commonwealth Karate Championships is an event that is organised by the Commonwealth Karate Federation for karateka from the Commonwealth. As well as creating competitive opportunities and crowning Commonwealth champions in the sport, the event aims to demonstrate that competition karate is suitable for inclusion in the Commonwealth Games, having been included in the 2020 Summer Olympics and other multisport events. The karate federations of Commonwealth countries are invited to send their national squads to participate in the elite competition, provided that they are members of the World Karate Federation.

This was expanded in Edinburgh 2008, as an open division was introduced, allowing competitors from outside a national squad to enter the event. Further expansion occurred in Johannesburg 2009 with the introduction of cadet and junior categories in the elite competition. In 2022, the championships will be held in the same city as that years Commonwealth Games for the first time, but as a separate event. As of 2022, Karate has not been included in a Games program.

== List of Commonwealth Karate Championships ==
Edition	Year	City	Country	Date	Events
1	1988	Sydney	Australia		
2	2003	Manchester	England	30 Aug – 31 Aug	
3	2005	Wellington	New Zealand	12 Aug – 14 Aug	
4	2008	Edinburgh	Scotland	31 May - 1 Jun	
5	2009	Johannesburg	South Africa	16 Oct - 17 Oct	
6	2011	Sydney	Australia	30 Jul - 31 Jul	
7	2013	Montreal	Canada	11 Oct - 13 Oct	113
8	2015	New Delhi	India	18 Sep - 20 Sep	79
9	2018	Durban	South Africa	29 Nov. to 2nd Dec.	51
10	2022	Birmingham	England	September 6th-11th	TBD

== Championships ==
=== Australia 1988 ===
The first Commonwealth Karate Championships were held Sidney Australia in 1988. Competition was for men only, and consisted of only three weight categories.

Great Britain entered as a single entity. In addition, at this tournament, Australia, Canada, India, Malaysia, New Zealand, Pakistan, Singapore and Sri Lanka were also represented.

Event	First	Second	Third
Lightweight	Terry Prescott; Great Britain	Milos Ivanovic; Australia	Wayne Hinschen; Australia
Middleweight	Nicholas Da Costa; Great Britain	Peter Collas; Australia	Tom Levar; Australia
Heavyweight	Michael Thompson; Great Britain	Hale Pahetogia; New Zealand	Trevor Marriott; Great Britain

* Host nation (Australia)

1st Commonwealth Karate Championships
Rank	Nation	Gold	Silver	Bronze	Total
1	Great Britain (GBR)	3	0	1	4
2	Australia (AUS)	0	2	2	4
3	New Zealand (NZL)	0	1	0	1
Totals (3 entries)		3	3	3	9

Manchester 2003

The second Commonwealth Karate Championships were held in Manchester, England on 30–31 August 2003.

=== Wellington 2005 ===
The third Commonwealth Karate Championships were held in Wellington, New Zealand on 12–14 August 2005, hosted by Karate New Zealand.

==== Elite Event Medal Table 2005 ====
Country	Gold	Silver	Bronze	Total
England	5	2	5	12
Scotland	4	5	5	14
South Africa	4	4	10	18
Australia	2	7	19	28
Canada	2	2	2	6
Wales	1		3	4
Botswana		2	4	6
New Zealand		1	1	2
Northern Ireland			2	2

=== Edinburgh 2008 ===
The fourth Commonwealth Karate Championships were held in Edinburgh, Scotland on 31 May to 1 June 2008, hosted by the Scottish Karate Governing Body. An open division was introduced, which allowed competitors from outside a national squad to enter the event and also provided the first children's categories at the event.

==== Elite Event Medal Table 2008 ====
Rank	Nation	Gold	Silver	Bronze	Total
1	England	5	2	5	12
2	Scotland	4	5	5	14
3	South Africa	4	4	10	18
4	Canada	2	2	2	6
5	Wales	1	0	3	4
6	Botswana	0	2	3	5
7	New Zealand	0	1	1	2
8	Northern Ireland	0	0	2	2
Totals (8 entries)		16	16	31	63

=== Johannesburg 2009 ===
The fifth Commonwealth Karate Championships were held in Johannesburg, South Africa on 16–17 October 2009, hosted by Karate South Africa. Following the introduction of an open event in Edinburgh 2009, cadet and junior categories were introduced to the elite event in line with World Karate Federation rules of competition.

=== Sydney 2011 ===
The sixth Commonwealth Karate Championships were held in Sydney, Australia on 30–31 July 2011, hosted by Australian Karate Federation.

=== Montreal 2013 ===
The seventh Commonwealth Karate Championships were held in Montreal, Quebec, Canada on 11–13 October 2013, hosted by Karate Canada.

=== New Delhi 2015 ===
The eighth Commonwealth Karate Championships will be held at Talkatora Indoor Stadium, New Delhi, India 18–20 September 2015. It will be hosted by Karate Association of India.

==== Elite Event Medal Table 2015 ====
Country	Gold	Silver	Bronze	Total
India	44	44	81	169
Sri Lanka	9	12	30	51
Australia	9	5	10	24
New Zealand	7	7	11	25
South Africa	5	5	4	14
Malaysia	4	1	4	9
Botswana	1	2	4	6
Bangladesh		2	2	4

=== Durban South Africa 2018 ===
The 9th Commonwealth Karate Championships will be held at Olive Convention Centre in Durban, South Africa 29 November to 2 December 2018 – It will be hosted by Karate South Africa.

== National Karate Federations ==
- India
- Australia
- Canada
- England
- New Zealand
- Northern Ireland
- Scotland
- South Africa
- Wales
