= 2012 Karate1 Premier League =

International karate competition series

The Karate 1 – Premier League 2012 is a series of international karate competitions organized by the World Karate Federation (WKF) during the year 2012. It includes several stages of the Premier League circuit as well as Karate World Cup tournaments.

== Events ==
Karate 1 – Premier League 2012
Stages	Date	Series	City	Country
1	14–15 January 2012	Premier League – Paris	Paris	France
2	10–11 March 2012	Premier League – Dordrecht	Dordrecht	Netherlands
3	23–24 June 2012	Premier League – Jakarta	Jakarta	Indonesia
4	18–19 August 2012	World Cup – Busan	Busan	South Korea
5	1–2 September 2012	Premier League – Istanbul	Istanbul	Turkey
6	22–23 September 2012	Premier League – Frankfurt/Hanau	Hanau	Germany
7	13–14 October 2012	World Cup – Athens	Athens	Greece
8	8–9 December 2012	Premier League – Salzburg	Salzburg	Austria

== Karate 1 Premier League – Paris 2012 ==
The Karate 1 Premier League – Paris 2012 was held from 14 to 15 January 2012 in Paris, France.

=== Men ===
Event	Gold	Silver	Bronze
Individual kata	Antonio Díaz; Venezuela	Cleiver Casanova; Venezuela	Miguel Galindo; Venezuela
Individual kata	Antonio Díaz; Venezuela	Cleiver Casanova; Venezuela	Mattia Busato; Italy
Team kata	France; Romain Lacoste; Jonathan Maruani; Jonathan Plagnol	Croatia; Ivan Ermenc; Franjo Maskarin; Damjan Padovan	Germany; Kristian Agsten; Wolf-Peter Mühlhans; Jan Urke
Team kata	France; Romain Lacoste; Jonathan Maruani; Jonathan Plagnol	Croatia; Ivan Ermenc; Franjo Maskarin; Damjan Padovan	France; Ahmed Zemouri; Adrien Leitao; Lucas Jeannot
Kumite -60 kg	Johan Lopes; France	Antonio Vastola; Italy	Luca Maresca; Italy
Kumite -60 kg	Johan Lopes; France	Antonio Vastola; Italy	Michele Giuliani; Italy
Kumite -67 kg	William Rolle; France	Abdelillah Boujedi; Morocco	Raphaël Bonelli; France
Kumite -67 kg	William Rolle; France	Abdelillah Boujedi; Morocco	Nikolaos Gidakos; Greece
Kumite -75 kg	Rafael Aghayev; Azerbaijan	Nizar Halim; Morocco	Azdin Rghoui; France
Kumite -75 kg	Rafael Aghayev; Azerbaijan	Nizar Halim; Morocco	Illya Nikulin; Ukraine
Kumite -84 kg	Diego Vandeschrick; Belgium	Mehmet Bolat; Germany	Thomas Aubertin; France
Kumite -84 kg	Diego Vandeschrick; Belgium	Mehmet Bolat; Germany	Yaroslav Horuna; Ukraine
Kumite +84 kg	Zharko Arsovski; North Macedonia	Stefano Maniscalco; Italy	Almir Cecunjanin; Montenegro
Kumite +84 kg	Zharko Arsovski; North Macedonia	Stefano Maniscalco; Italy	Jonathan Horne; Germany

=== Women ===
Event	Gold	Silver	Bronze
Individual kata	Rika Usami; Japan	Kazuyo Inoue; Japan	Rimi Kajikawa; Japan
Individual kata	Rika Usami; Japan	Kazuyo Inoue; Japan	Sandy Scordo; France
Team kata	Italy; Michela Pezzetti; Viviana Bottaro; Sara Battaglia	Croatia; Marijana Kiuk; Vlatka Kiuk; Petra Krivičić	Italy; Giulia Bertagna; Martina Russi; Chiara Zucchi
Kumite -50 kg	Betty Aquilina; France	Alexandra Recchia; France	Asunur Yıldırım; Turkey
Kumite -50 kg	Betty Aquilina; France	Alexandra Recchia; France	Dyhia Chiki; Algeria
Kumite -55 kg	Maeva Samy; France	Bahar Erşeker; Turkey	Lucie Ignace; France
Kumite -55 kg	Maeva Samy; France	Bahar Erşeker; Turkey	Natasha Ilievska; North Macedonia
Kumite -61 kg	Alisa Buchinger; Austria	Lolita Dona; France	Cristina Ferrer García; Spain
Kumite -61 kg	Alisa Buchinger; Austria	Lolita Dona; France	Natalie Williams; England
Kumite -68 kg	Maria Weiß; Germany	Inga Sherozia; Russia	Tiffany Fanjat; France
Kumite -68 kg	Maria Weiß; Germany	Inga Sherozia; Russia	Kamila Warda; Poland
Kumite +68 kg	Nadège Ait Ibrahim; France	Katie Hurry; England	Masa Martinovic; Croatia
Kumite +68 kg	Nadège Ait Ibrahim; France	Katie Hurry; England	Anne-Laure Florentin; France

== Karate 1 Premier League – Dordrecht 2012 ==
The Karate 1 Premier League – Dordrecht 2012 was held from 10 to 11 March 2012 in Dordrecht, Netherlands.

=== Men ===
Event	Gold	Silver	Bronze
Individual kata	Minh Dack; France	Kristian Agsten; Germany	Reece Taylor; England
Individual kata	Minh Dack; France	Kristian Agsten; Germany	Roman Kubovic; Slovakia
Team kata	Croatia; Damjan Padovan; Franjo Maskarin; Ivan Ermenc	Germany; Kristian Agsten; Jonas Glaser; Jan Urke	France; Lucas Jeannot; Adrien Leitao; Ahmed Zemouri
Team kata	Croatia; Damjan Padovan; Franjo Maskarin; Ivan Ermenc	Germany; Kristian Agsten; Jonas Glaser; Jan Urke	Netherlands; Fabrice de Boer; Giorgio Fung; Ivan Fung
Kumite -60 kg	Casper Lidegaard; Denmark	Angelo Crescenzo; Italy	Douglas Brose; Brazil
Kumite -60 kg	Casper Lidegaard; Denmark	Angelo Crescenzo; Italy	Alexander Heimann; Germany
Kumite -67 kg	Marvin Garin; France	Geoffrey Berens; Netherlands	William Rolle; France
Kumite -67 kg	Marvin Garin; France	Geoffrey Berens; Netherlands	Salvatore Serino; Italy
Kumite -75 kg	Davy Dona; France	Thomas Scott; United States	Noah Bitsch; Germany
Kumite -75 kg	Davy Dona; France	Thomas Scott; United States	Rene Smaal; Netherlands
Kumite -84 kg	Ognen Gruevski; North Macedonia	Tarek Abdesselem; France	Hany Keshta; Egypt
Kumite -84 kg	Ognen Gruevski; North Macedonia	Tarek Abdesselem; France	Ruslan Sadikov; Latvia
Kumite +84 kg	Jonathan Horne; Germany	Lauri Mengel; Estonia	Philip Carlsen; Denmark
Kumite +84 kg	Jonathan Horne; Germany	Lauri Mengel; Estonia	Michael Chantalou; France

=== Women ===
Event	Gold	Silver	Bronze
Individual kata	Rika Usami; Japan	Rimi Kajikawa; Japan	Sandy Scordo; France
Individual kata	Rika Usami; Japan	Rimi Kajikawa; Japan	Kazuyo Inoue; Japan
Team kata	Germany; Franziska Krieg; Denise Pawlowsky; Sabine Schneider	France; Céline Carbonnel; Fanny Carbonnel; Sarah Lehmann	Croatia; Petra Krivičić; Vlatka Kiuk; Marijana Kiuk
Team kata	Germany; Franziska Krieg; Denise Pawlowsky; Sabine Schneider	France; Céline Carbonnel; Fanny Carbonnel; Sarah Lehmann	Germany; Christine Heinrich; Jasmin Bleul; Sophie Wachter
Kumite -50 kg	Alexandra Recchia; France	Betty Aquilina; France	Lucia Kovačiková; Slovakia
Kumite -50 kg	Alexandra Recchia; France	Betty Aquilina; France	Gülşah Akdağ; Sweden
Kumite -55 kg	Jana Bitsch; Germany	Sara Cardin; Italy	Jana Vojtikevičová; Slovakia
Kumite -55 kg	Jana Bitsch; Germany	Sara Cardin; Italy	Lucie Ignace; France
Kumite -61 kg	Alisa Buchinger; Austria	Natasha Stefanovska; North Macedonia	Natalie Williams; England
Kumite -61 kg	Alisa Buchinger; Austria	Natasha Stefanovska; North Macedonia	Sonja Steland; Luxembourg
Kumite -68 kg	Maria Weiß; Germany	Kamila Warda; Poland	Ivona Tubić; Croatia
Kumite -68 kg	Maria Weiß; Germany	Kamila Warda; Poland	Tiffany Fanjat; France
Kumite +68 kg	Vanesca Nortan; Netherlands	Ciska van der Voort; Netherlands	Jessica Cargill; Switzerland
Kumite +68 kg	Vanesca Nortan; Netherlands	Ciska van der Voort; Netherlands	Katie Hurry; England

== Karate 1 Premier League – Jakarta 2012 ==
The Karate 1 Premier League – Jakarta 2012 was held from 23 to 24 June 2012 in Jakarta, Indonesia.

=== Men ===
Event	Gold	Silver	Bronze
Individual kata	Antonio Díaz; Venezuela	Kam Kah Sam; Malaysia	James Giuliano; Australia
Individual kata	Antonio Díaz; Venezuela	Kam Kah Sam; Malaysia	Ryo Kiyuna; Japan
Team kata	Indonesia; Aswar Aswar; Faizal Zainuddin; Fidelys Lolobua	Iran; Farzad Mohammad Khanloo; Armin Roushanioskouei; Ahad Shahin Haragh	Japan; Takuya Uemura; Ryo Kiyuna; Arata Kinjo
Team kata	Indonesia; Aswar Aswar; Faizal Zainuddin; Fidelys Lolobua	Iran; Farzad Mohammad Khanloo; Armin Roushanioskouei; Ahad Shahin Haragh	Indonesia; Angga Firmala Putera; Ridi Okwar; Veri Maradona Sinaga
Kumite -60 kg	Ji Hwan Lee; South Korea	Saeid Alipour; Iran	Ho Chun Lee; Hong Kong
Kumite -60 kg	Ji Hwan Lee; South Korea	Saeid Alipour; Iran	Prasetyo Piscesa Yellovin; Indonesia
Kumite -67 kg	Saeid Ahmadi Karyani; Iran	Hamed Ziksari; Iran	Thomas Kaserer; Austria
Kumite -67 kg	Saeid Ahmadi Karyani; Iran	Hamed Ziksari; Iran	Tsuneari Yahiro; Australia
Kumite -75 kg	Ko Matsuhisa; Japan	Mohammad Hadi Davoudabadi Farahani; Iran	Hiroto Shinohara; Japan
Kumite -75 kg	Ko Matsuhisa; Japan	Mohammad Hadi Davoudabadi Farahani; Iran	Saeid Farrokhi; Iran
Kumite -84 kg	Ali Fadakar; Iran	Ryutaro Araga; Japan	Amir Amiri; Iran
Kumite -84 kg	Ali Fadakar; Iran	Ryutaro Araga; Japan	Mansour Hassan Beigy; Iran
Kumite +84 kg	Ibrahim Gary; France	Zabihollah Poorshab; Iran	Saman Heydari; Iran
Kumite +84 kg	Ibrahim Gary; France	Zabihollah Poorshab; Iran	Michael Chantalou; France

=== Women ===
Event	Gold	Silver	Bronze
Individual kata	Rika Usami; Japan	Rimi Kajikawa; Japan	Kazuyo Inoue; Japan
Individual kata	Rika Usami; Japan	Rimi Kajikawa; Japan	Afsaneh Mahsa; Iran
Team kata	Iran; Elnaz Taghipour; Najmeh Sadat Ghazizadeh-Fard; Afsaneh Mahsa	Malaysia; Chee Yee Thor; Celine Xin Yi Lee; Yee Voon Khaw	Indonesia; Ayu Rachmawati; Eva Fitria Setiawati; Siti Maryam
Team kata	Iran; Elnaz Taghipour; Najmeh Sadat Ghazizadeh-Fard; Afsaneh Mahsa	Malaysia; Chee Yee Thor; Celine Xin Yi Lee; Yee Voon Khaw	Indonesia; Dewi Prasetya Kurniawan; Mayangsari Prima Jeihen Putri; Ulfah Maria
Kumite -50 kg	Alexandra Recchia; France	So-Young Jang; South Korea	Nur Eleena Ab Malik; Malaysia
Kumite -50 kg	Alexandra Recchia; France	So-Young Jang; South Korea	Bettina Plank; Austria
Kumite -55 kg	Miki Kobayashi; Japan	Nisha Alagasan; Malaysia	Leila Bahrami; Iran
Kumite -55 kg	Miki Kobayashi; Japan	Nisha Alagasan; Malaysia	Maéva Samy; France
Kumite -61 kg	Yu Miyamoto; Japan	Alisa Buchinger; Austria	Yamini Gopalasamy; Malaysia
Kumite -61 kg	Yu Miyamoto; Japan	Alisa Buchinger; Austria	Shakila Salni Jefry Krishnan; Malaysia
Kumite -68 kg	Tiffany Fanjat; France	Kamila Warda; Poland	Pegah Zangeneh Karkooti; Iran
Kumite -68 kg	Tiffany Fanjat; France	Kamila Warda; Poland	Stephanie Harris; Australia
Kumite +68 kg	Hamideh Abbasali; Iran	Elaheh Rezazadeh Mehrizi; Iran	Kendra Clough; Australia
Kumite +68 kg	Hamideh Abbasali; Iran	Elaheh Rezazadeh Mehrizi; Iran	Michelle Wilson; Australia

== Karate 1 World Cup - Busan 2012 ==
Karate 1 World Cup - Busan 2012 was held from 18 to 19 August 2012 in Busan, Korea

=== Men ===
Event	Gold	Silver	Bronze
Individual kata	Tze Wai Leong; Malaysia	Heejun Park; South Korea	Kah Sam Kam; Malaysia
Individual kata	Tze Wai Leong; Malaysia	Heejun Park; South Korea	Yi Hsiang Wang; Taiwan
Kumite -60 kg	Ji Hwan Lee; South Korea	Chin Pang Law; Hong Kong	Minh Duc Tran; Vietnam
Kumite -60 kg	Ji Hwan Lee; South Korea	Chin Pang Law; Hong Kong	Mohammad Ghasemilaskoukalayeh; Iran
Kumite -67 kg	Shahin Naghipour Jafari; Iran	Huy Thanh Nguyen; Vietnam	Gyu Sen Kang; South Korea
Kumite -67 kg	Shahin Naghipour Jafari; Iran	Huy Thanh Nguyen; Vietnam	Wei Chieh Tang; Taiwan
Kumite -75 kg	Ka Wai Lee; Hong Kong	Tzu-Yao Yen; Taiwan	Chun Ming Sun; Taiwan
Kumite -75 kg	Ka Wai Lee; Hong Kong	Tzu-Yao Yen; Taiwan	Mohammdreza Bakhshmohammadlo; Iran
Kumite -84 kg	Mahdi Soltani Kalvanagh; Iran	Jae Heon Shin; South Korea	Min Soo Jang; South Korea
Kumite -84 kg	Mahdi Soltani Kalvanagh; Iran	Jae Heon Shin; South Korea	Kyung Nam Kang; South Korea
Kumite +84 kg	Maksim Shimchenko; Russia	Seung Min Cha; South Korea	Rojas Diego Saucedo; Bolivia

=== Women ===
Event	Gold	Silver	Bronze
Individual kata	Sandy Scordo; France	Nguyen Hoang Ngan; Vietnam	Nguyen Thi Hang; Vietnam
Individual kata	Sandy Scordo; France	Nguyen Hoang Ngan; Vietnam	Do Thi Thu Ha; Vietnam
Kumite -50 kg	So Young Jang; South Korea	Meng Hsien Hsieh; Chinese Taipei	Wan Yu Choi; Hong Kong
Kumite -50 kg	So Young Jang; South Korea	Meng Hsien Hsieh; Chinese Taipei	Mut Yiu Yip; Hong Kong
Kumite -55 kg	Tzu Yun Wen; Chinese Taipei	Elham Khorramjah; Iran	Man Sum Ma; Hong Kong
Kumite -55 kg	Tzu Yun Wen; Chinese Taipei	Elham Khorramjah; Iran	Ting Ting Lee; Hong Kong
Kumite -61 kg	Hau Yan Chan; Hong Kong	Princess Diane Sicangco; Philippines	Pui Ho Chan; Hong Kong
Kumite -61 kg	Hau Yan Chan; Hong Kong	Princess Diane Sicangco; Philippines	Su Jung Shin; South Korea
Kumite -68 kg	Joanna Mae Ylanan; Philippines	On You Park; South Korea	Nasim Armandaei; Iran
Kumite -68 kg	Joanna Mae Ylanan; Philippines	On You Park; South Korea	[[|]]
Kumite +68 kg	Han Na Cheon; South Korea	Chia-Yu Chen; Chinese Taipei	[[|]]
Kumite +68 kg	Han Na Cheon; South Korea	Chia-Yu Chen; Chinese Taipei	[[|]]

== Karate 1 Premier League - Istanbul 2012 ==
The Karate 1 Premier League – Istanbul 2012 was held from 1 to 2 September 2012 in Istanbul, Turkey.

=== Men ===
Event	Gold	Silver	Bronze
Individual kata	Japan; Ryo Kiyuna	Japan; Itaru Oki	Iran; Farid Haghighi
Individual kata	Japan; Ryo Kiyuna	Japan; Itaru Oki	Venezuela; Antonio Díaz
Team kata	Japan; Takuya Uemura; Ryo Kiyuna; Arata Kinjo	Croatia; Ivan Ermenc; Franjo Maskarin; Damjan Padovan	Germany; Philip Juettner; Florian Genau; Jan Urke
Team kata	Japan; Takuya Uemura; Ryo Kiyuna; Arata Kinjo	Croatia; Ivan Ermenc; Franjo Maskarin; Damjan Padovan	Russia; Emil Skovorodnikov; Aleksander Rusanov; Nikita Bakanov
Kumite -60 kg	Latvia; Kalvis Kalniņš	Iran; Amir Mahdi Zadeh	Italy; Michele Giuliani
Kumite -60 kg	Latvia; Kalvis Kalniņš	Iran; Amir Mahdi Zadeh	Iran; Alireza Ajdadi Hasankiadeh
Kumite -67 kg	Iran; Saeid Ahmadi Karyani	Armenia; Vigen Ohanyan	Austria; Thomas Kaserer
Kumite -67 kg	Iran; Saeid Ahmadi Karyani	Armenia; Vigen Ohanyan	Russia; Albert Budaev
Kumite -75 kg	Italy; Luigi Busà	Germany; Noah Bitsch	Iran; Saeid Farrokhi
Kumite -75 kg	Italy; Luigi Busà	Germany; Noah Bitsch	Iran; Ebrahim Hassan Beigi
Kumite -84 kg	Italy; Valentino Fioravante	Iran; Ali Fadakar	Iran; Maziar Elhami Varmezani
Kumite -84 kg	Italy; Valentino Fioravante	Iran; Ali Fadakar	Turkey; Gökhan Gündüz
Kumite +84 kg	Germany; Jonathan Horne	Iran; Saman Heydari	Italy; Stefano Maniscalco
Kumite +84 kg	Germany; Jonathan Horne	Iran; Saman Heydari	Netherlands; Moreno Sheppard

=== Women ===
Event	Gold	Silver	BronzeA
Individual kata	Japan; Rika Usami	Japan; Rimi Kajikawa	Japan; Yoko Kimura
Individual kata	Japan; Rika Usami	Japan; Rimi Kajikawa	Japan; Suzuka Kashioka
Team kata	Japan; Miku Morioka; Yoko Kimura; Suzuka Kashioka	Iran; Elnaz Taghipour; Najmeh Sadat Ghazizadeh Fard; Mahsa Afsaneh	Croatia; Marijana Kiuk; Vlatka Kiuk; Petra Krivičić
Team kata	Japan; Miku Morioka; Yoko Kimura; Suzuka Kashioka	Iran; Elnaz Taghipour; Najmeh Sadat Ghazizadeh Fard; Mahsa Afsaneh	Germany; Jasmin Bleul; Christine Heinrich; Sophie Wachter
Kumite -50 kg	Turkey; Serap Özçelik	Chile; Gabriela Bruna Piutrin	Kazakhstan; Sabina Zakharova
Kumite -50 kg	Turkey; Serap Özçelik	Chile; Gabriela Bruna Piutrin	Iran; Nasrin Dousti
Kumite -55 kg	Brazil; Valéria Kumizaki	Turkey; Tuba Yenen	Italy; Sara Cardin
Kumite -55 kg	Brazil; Valéria Kumizaki	Turkey; Tuba Yenen	Germany; Jana Bitsch
Kumite -61 kg	Austria; Alisa Buchinger	Switzerland; Elena Quirici	Turkey; Bahar Erseker
Kumite -61 kg	Austria; Alisa Buchinger	Switzerland; Elena Quirici	Japan; Yu Miyamoto
Kumite -68 kg	Russia; Inga Sherozia	Russia; Evgeniya Podborodnikova	Turkey; Hafsa Seyda Burucu
Kumite -68 kg	Russia; Inga Sherozia	Russia; Evgeniya Podborodnikova	Poland; Kamila Warda
Kumite +68 kg	Turkey; Meltem Hocaoğlu	Netherlands; Ciska van der Voort	Finland; Helena Kuusisto
Kumite +68 kg	Turkey; Meltem Hocaoğlu	Netherlands; Ciska van der Voort	Switzerland; Jessica Cargill

== Karate 1 Premier League - Frankfurt/Hanau 2012 ==
The Karate 1 Premier League – Frankfurt/Hanau 2012 was held from 22 to 23 September 2012 in Hanau, Germany.

=== Men ===
Event	Gold	Silver	Bronze
Individual kata	Venezuela; Antonio Díaz	Italy; Luca Valdesi	Colombia; David Contreras
Individual kata	Venezuela; Antonio Díaz	Italy; Luca Valdesi	Egypt; Ahmed Ashraf Shawky
Team kata	Italy; Vincenzo Figuccio; Lucio Maurino; Luca Valdesi	Germany; Florian Genau; Philip Jüttner; Jan Urke	Croatia; Ivan Ermenc; Franjo Maskarin; Damjan Padovan
Team kata	Italy; Vincenzo Figuccio; Lucio Maurino; Luca Valdesi	Germany; Florian Genau; Philip Jüttner; Jan Urke	Portugal; Jorge Caeiros; Pedro Monteiro; Luis Silva
Kumite -60 kg	Latvia; Kalvis Kalniņš	Colombia; Andrés Rendón	Italy; Luca Maresca
Kumite -60 kg	Latvia; Kalvis Kalniņš	Colombia; Andrés Rendón	Ukraine; Oleh Filipovych
Kumite -67 kg	France; Mathieu Cossou	Venezuela; Andrés Eduardo Madera	Italy; Ciro Massa
Kumite -67 kg	France; Mathieu Cossou	Venezuela; Andrés Eduardo Madera	Austria; Thomas Kaserer
Kumite -75 kg	Netherlands; Rene Smaal	Germany; Noah Bitsch	France; Davy Dona
Kumite -75 kg	Netherlands; Rene Smaal	Germany; Noah Bitsch	United States; Thomas Scott
Kumite -84 kg	Netherlands; Timothy Petersen	Belgium; Diego Davy Vandeschrick	Portugal; Nuno Moreira
Kumite -84 kg	Netherlands; Timothy Petersen	Belgium; Diego Davy Vandeschrick	France; Kenji Grillon
Kumite +84 kg	France; Nadir Benaisa	Netherlands; Moreno Sheppard	Chile; Alejandro Mellado Muñoz
Kumite +84 kg	France; Nadir Benaisa	Netherlands; Moreno Sheppard	France; Ibrahim Gary

=== Women ===
Event	Gold	Silver	Bronze
Individual kata	Vietnam; Nguyen Hoang Ngan	Japan; Rimi Kajikawa	Dominican Republic; Maria Dimitrova
Individual kata	Vietnam; Nguyen Hoang Ngan	Japan; Rimi Kajikawa	Italy; Viviana Bottaro
Team kata	Vietnam; Do Thi Thu Ha; Thanh Hang Nguyen; Thi Hang Nguyen	Germany; Jasmin Bleul; Christine Heinrich; Sophie Wachter	Italy; Sara Battaglia; Viviana Bottaro; Michela Pezzetti
Team kata	Vietnam; Do Thi Thu Ha; Thanh Hang Nguyen; Thi Hang Nguyen	Germany; Jasmin Bleul; Christine Heinrich; Sophie Wachter	Croatia; Marijana Kiuk; Vlatka Kiuk; Petra Krivičić
Kumite -50 kg	France; Betty Aquilina	France; Emilie Thouy	Germany; Duygu Bugur
Kumite -50 kg	France; Betty Aquilina	France; Emilie Thouy	Austria; Bettina Plank
Kumite -55 kg	France; Lucie Ignace	Germany; Jana Bitsch	Slovakia; Jana Vojtikevičová
Kumite -55 kg	France; Lucie Ignace	Germany; Jana Bitsch	Italy; Sara Cardin
Kumite -61 kg	Australia; Kristina Mah	France; Alizée Agier	England; Natalie Karina Joyce Williams
Kumite -61 kg	Australia; Kristina Mah	France; Alizée Agier	Italy; Laura Pasqua
Kumite -68 kg	France; Tiffany Fanjat	Spain; Cristina Vizcaíno González	United States; Cheryl Murphy
Kumite -68 kg	France; Tiffany Fanjat	Spain; Cristina Vizcaíno González	Norway; Gitte Brunstad
Kumite +68 kg	Croatia; Masa Martinovic	Netherlands; Vanesca Nortan	Finland; Helena Kuusisto
Kumite +68 kg	Croatia; Masa Martinovic	Netherlands; Vanesca Nortan	France; Anne-Laure Florentin

== Karate 1 World Cup - Athens 2012 ==
The Karate 1 World Cup – Athens 2012 was held from 13 to 14 October 2012 in Athens, Greece.

=== Men ===
Event	Gold	Silver	Bronze
Individual kata	Luca Valdesi; Italy	Mustafa Ibrahim; Egypt	Ibrahim Magdy Moussa Ahmed; Egypt
Individual kata	Luca Valdesi; Italy	Mustafa Ibrahim; Egypt	Ali Sofuoğlu; Turkey
Team kata	Italy; Italy	Egypt; Egypt	Turkey; Turkey
Team kata	Italy; Italy	Egypt; Egypt	Russia; Russia
Kumite -60 kg	Mohamed Ali; Egypt	Angelo Crescenzo; Italy	Michele Giuliani; Italy
Kumite -60 kg	Mohamed Ali; Egypt	Angelo Crescenzo; Italy	Nissan Davidov; Israel
Kumite -67 kg	Ahmed Naser Rady; Egypt	Magdy Mamdouh Mohamed; Egypt	Nikolaos Gidakos; Greece
Kumite -67 kg	Ahmed Naser Rady; Egypt	Magdy Mamdouh Mohamed; Egypt	Ciro Massa; Italy
Kumite -75 kg	Luigi Busà; Italy	Sayed Abdelnabi; Egypt	Mauro Scognamiglio; Italy
Kumite -75 kg	Luigi Busà; Italy	Sayed Abdelnabi; Egypt	Nikolaos Kosmas; Greece
Kumite -84 kg	Nello Maestri; Italy	Hany Shaker Keshta; Egypt	Ahmed Mokhtar; Egypt
Kumite -84 kg	Nello Maestri; Italy	Hany Shaker Keshta; Egypt	Simon Antikj; North Macedonia
Kumite +84 kg	Iraklis Tsamourlidis; Greece	Abdelrahman Abdelmonem; Egypt	Stefano Maniscalco; Italy
Kumite +84 kg	Iraklis Tsamourlidis; Greece	Abdelrahman Abdelmonem; Egypt	Dimitrios Margaritopoulos; Greece

=== Women ===
Event	Gold	Silver	Bronze
Individual kata	Sara Battaglia; Italy	Sofia Marika Livitsanou; Greece	Kübra Akarsu; Turkey
Individual kata	Sara Battaglia; Italy	Sofia Marika Livitsanou; Greece	Mai Gamaleldin Salama; Egypt
Team kata	Greece; Greece	Egypt; Egypt	Austria; Austria
Kumite -50 kg	Maria Alexiadis; Australia	Ting Ting Lee; Hong Kong	Eudoxia Kosmidou; Greece
Kumite -50 kg	Maria Alexiadis; Australia	Ting Ting Lee; Hong Kong	Ngai Ching Choi; Hong Kong
Kumite -55 kg	Nadia Ahmed Abdel Monem; Egypt	Jennifer Warling; Luxembourg	Jacqueline Factos Henao; Ecuador
Kumite -55 kg	Nadia Ahmed Abdel Monem; Egypt	Jennifer Warling; Luxembourg	Yassmin Attia; Egypt
Kumite -61 kg	Randa Roshdy; Egypt	Sonja Steland; Luxembourg	Nada Mohamed; Egypt
Kumite -61 kg	Randa Roshdy; Egypt	Sonja Steland; Luxembourg	Ka Man Chan; Hong Kong
Kumite -68 kg	Heba Abd El Rahman Abd El Hamid; Egypt	Natalia Brozulatto; Brazil	Lucélia Ribeiro; Brazil
Kumite -68 kg	Heba Abd El Rahman Abd El Hamid; Egypt	Natalia Brozulatto; Brazil	Roberta Minet; Italy
Kumite +68 kg	Zeinab Koutb; Egypt	Helena Kuusisto; Finland	Eleni Chatziliadou; Greece
Kumite +68 kg	Zeinab Koutb; Egypt	Helena Kuusisto; Finland	Aya Gharib; Egypt

== Karate1 Premier League -Grand Final- Salzburg 2012 ==
The Karate 1 Premier League -Grand Final- Salzburg 2012 was held from 8 to 9 December 2012 in Salzburg, Austria.

=== Men ===
Event	Gold	Silver	Bronze
Individual kata	Austria; Alisa Buchinger	Croatia; Ana Lenard	Luxembourg; Sonja Steland
Individual kata	Austria; Alisa Buchinger	Croatia; Ana Lenard	Belgium; Nele De Vos
Team kata	Croatia; Ivan Ermenc; Franjo Maskarin; Damjan Padovan	Germany; Kristian Agsten; Jonas Glaser; Jan Urke	Austria; Benjamin Rath; Mike Schaunig; Patrick Valet
Kumite -60 kg	Latvia; Kalvis Kalniņš	Ukraine; Oleh Filipovych	Italy; Luca Maresca
Kumite -60 kg	Latvia; Kalvis Kalniņš	Ukraine; Oleh Filipovych	Belgium; Raphael Piras
Kumite -67 kg	Austria; Thomas Kaserer	Ukraine; Ostap Hladun	France; Marvin Garin
Kumite -67 kg	Austria; Thomas Kaserer	Ukraine; Ostap Hladun	Ukraine; Denys Sumishevskyi
Kumite -75 kg	Germany; Noah Bitsch	Ukraine; Stanislav Horuna	Hong Kong; Ka Wai Lee
Kumite -75 kg	Germany; Noah Bitsch	Ukraine; Stanislav Horuna	Ukraine; Illya Nikulin
Kumite -84 kg	France; Clément Besniet	Ukraine; Yaroslav Horuna	Spain; Luis García Jiménez
Kumite -84 kg	France; Clément Besniet	Ukraine; Yaroslav Horuna	Ukraine; Ivan Drozd
Kumite +84 kg	Germany; Jonathan Horne	Belarus; Andrei Grinevich	Ukraine; Artem Vokh
Kumite +84 kg	Germany; Jonathan Horne	Belarus; Andrei Grinevich	Ukraine; Yevhen Motovylin

=== Women ===
Event	Gold	Silver	Bronze
Individual kata	Sandy Scordo; France	Miroslava Vašeková; Czech Republic	Lok Man Wu; Hong Kong
Individual kata	Sandy Scordo; France	Miroslava Vašeková; Czech Republic	Yee Yin Tung; Hong Kong
Team kata	Croatia; Marijana Kiuk; Vlatka Kiuk; Petra Krivičić	Austria; Berner; König; Thajer	Austria; Sabrina Herzog; Julia Langhammer; Anna Reifberger
Kumite -50 kg	Austria; Bettina Plank	Andorra; Tania Ribeiro	Hong Kong; Mut Yiu Yip
Kumite -50 kg	Austria; Bettina Plank	Andorra; Tania Ribeiro	Ukraine; Kateryna Kryva
Kumite -55 kg	Ukraine; Zhanna Melnyk	Luxembourg; Jennifer Warling	Italy; Alessandra Hasani
Kumite -55 kg	Ukraine; Zhanna Melnyk	Luxembourg; Jennifer Warling	France; Maeva Samy
Kumite -61 kg	Austria; Alisa Buchinger	Croatia; Ana Lenard	Luxembourg; Sonja Steland
Kumite -61 kg	Austria; Alisa Buchinger	Croatia; Ana Lenard	Belgium; Nele De Vos
Kumite -68 kg	France; Tiffany Fanjat	Spain; Cristina Vizcaíno González	Ukraine; Iryna Kaminska
Kumite -68 kg	France; Tiffany Fanjat	Spain; Cristina Vizcaíno González	France; Alizée Agier
Kumite +68 kg	Croatia; Masa Martinovic	Italy; Chiara Zuanon	Venezuela; Yeisy Pina
Kumite +68 kg	Croatia; Masa Martinovic	Italy; Chiara Zuanon	Finland; Helena Kuusisto
