= 2011 Asian Karate Championships =

Karate competition

- Host city: Quanzhou, China
- Dates: 21–24 July 2011
- Main venue: Haixia Sports Center

The 2011 Asian Karate Championships are the tenth edition of the Senior Asian Karate Championships and 11th edition of the Cadet, Junior & U21 Asian Karate Championships and were held in Haixia Sports Center, Quanzhou, China from July 21 to July 24, 2011.

== Medalists ==
=== Men ===
Event	Gold	Silver	Bronze
Individual kata	Leong Tze Wai; Malaysia	Marwan Al-Maazmi; United Arab Emirates	Issei Shimbaba; Japan
Individual kata	Leong Tze Wai; Malaysia	Marwan Al-Maazmi; United Arab Emirates	Made Kateshov; Kazakhstan
Team kata	Japan; Takumi Sugino; Takato Soma; Koji Arimoto	Vietnam; Phạm Thái Huy; Nguyễn Thanh Long; Nguyễn Sơn Tùng	Indonesia; Faisal Zainuddin; Fidelys Lolobua; Aswar
Team kata	Japan; Takumi Sugino; Takato Soma; Koji Arimoto	Vietnam; Phạm Thái Huy; Nguyễn Thanh Long; Nguyễn Sơn Tùng	Kuwait; Mohammad Al-Qattan; Waleed Al-Enezi; Abdullah Al-Easa
Kumite −55 kg	Andrey Aktauov; Kazakhstan	Cheung Kwan Lok; Hong Kong	Sun Jingchao; China
Kumite −55 kg	Andrey Aktauov; Kazakhstan	Cheung Kwan Lok; Hong Kong	Loganeshaa Rao Ramarow; Malaysia
Kumite −60 kg	Lee Ji-hwan; South Korea	Darkhan Assadilov; Kazakhstan	Chien Cheng-kang; Chinese Taipei
Kumite −60 kg	Lee Ji-hwan; South Korea	Darkhan Assadilov; Kazakhstan	Amir Mehdizadeh; Iran
Kumite −67 kg	Saadi Abbas Jalbani; Pakistan	Kim Do-won; South Korea	Fahad Al-Khathami; Saudi Arabia
Kumite −67 kg	Saadi Abbas Jalbani; Pakistan	Kim Do-won; South Korea	Shinji Nagaki; Japan
Kumite −75 kg	Saeid Farrokhi; Iran	Li Haojie; China	Nguyễn Minh Phụng; Vietnam
Kumite −75 kg	Saeid Farrokhi; Iran	Li Haojie; China	Ryuichi Tani; Japan
Kumite −84 kg	Hatta Mahamut; Malaysia	Lee Ka Wai; Hong Kong	Mehdi Soltani; Iran
Kumite −84 kg	Hatta Mahamut; Malaysia	Lee Ka Wai; Hong Kong	Hendro Salim; Indonesia
Kumite +84 kg	Zabihollah Pourshab; Iran	Rustam Ashurov; Uzbekistan	Peng Hui; China
Kumite +84 kg	Zabihollah Pourshab; Iran	Rustam Ashurov; Uzbekistan	Ahmad Faqeer; Kuwait
Team kumite	Iran; Majid Khosravi; Zabihollah Pourshab; Mehdi Soltani; Nader Jodat; Saeid Farrokhi; Ebrahim Hassanbeigi; Ehsan Heidari	China; Liu Zhe; Peng Hui; Zhu Gangyong; Li Haojie; Chen Weijie; Cui Wenju; Dong Mingming	Saudi Arabia; Amro Al-Turkistani; Yahya Maydy; Imad Al-Malki; Majed Al-Khalifah; Fahad Al-Khathami
Team kumite	Iran; Majid Khosravi; Zabihollah Pourshab; Mehdi Soltani; Nader Jodat; Saeid Farrokhi; Ebrahim Hassanbeigi; Ehsan Heidari	China; Liu Zhe; Peng Hui; Zhu Gangyong; Li Haojie; Chen Weijie; Cui Wenju; Dong Mingming	Kazakhstan; Nikolay Repin; Rinat Sagandykov; Marlen Taukebayev; Yerzhan Kozhayev; Yermek Ainazarov; Darkhan Assadilov; Khalid Khalidov

=== Women ===
Event	Gold	Silver	Bronze
Individual kata	Rika Usami; Japan	Đỗ Thị Thu Hà; Vietnam	Flenty Enoch; Indonesia
Individual kata	Rika Usami; Japan	Đỗ Thị Thu Hà; Vietnam	Mahsa Afsaneh; Iran
Team kata	Japan; Miku Morioka; Yoko Kimura; Suzuka Kashioka	Iran; Elnaz Taghipour; Najmeh Ghazizadeh; Mahsa Afsaneh	Indonesia; Yulianti Syafrudin; Dewi Prasetya; Sisilia Agustin
Team kata	Japan; Miku Morioka; Yoko Kimura; Suzuka Kashioka	Iran; Elnaz Taghipour; Najmeh Ghazizadeh; Mahsa Afsaneh	Vietnam; Nguyễn Thanh Hằng; Nguyễn Thị Hằng; Đỗ Thị Thu Hà
Kumite −50 kg	Jang So-young; South Korea	Hikaru Ono; Japan	Vũ Thị Nguyệt Ánh; Vietnam
Kumite −50 kg	Jang So-young; South Korea	Hikaru Ono; Japan	Sabina Zakharova; Kazakhstan
Kumite −55 kg	Wang Xiaohong; China	Miki Kobayashi; Japan	Ahn Tae-eun; South Korea
Kumite −55 kg	Wang Xiaohong; China	Miki Kobayashi; Japan	Yekaterina Khupovets; Kazakhstan
Kumite −61 kg	Yu Miyamoto; Japan	Yin Xiaoyan; China	Madina Utelbayeva; Kazakhstan
Kumite −61 kg	Yu Miyamoto; Japan	Yin Xiaoyan; China	Yamini Gopalasamy; Malaysia
Kumite −68 kg	Emiko Honma; Japan	Tang Lingling; China	Sofiya Kaspulatova; Uzbekistan
Kumite −68 kg	Emiko Honma; Japan	Tang Lingling; China	Yulanda Asmuruf; Indonesia
Kumite +68 kg	Zeng Cuilan; China	Hamideh Abbasali; Iran	Chen Chia-yu; Chinese Taipei
Kumite +68 kg	Zeng Cuilan; China	Hamideh Abbasali; Iran	Jamaliah Jamaludin; Malaysia
Team kumite	China; Yin Xiaoyan; Zeng Cuilan; Li Hong; Tang Lingling	Japan; Yu Miyamoto; Hikaru Ono; Emiko Honma; Miki Kobayashi	Vietnam; Trần Hoàng Yến Phượng; Vũ Thị Nguyệt Ánh; Bùi Thị Ngân; Lê Bích Phương
Team kumite	China; Yin Xiaoyan; Zeng Cuilan; Li Hong; Tang Lingling	Japan; Yu Miyamoto; Hikaru Ono; Emiko Honma; Miki Kobayashi	Iran; Samira Malekipour; Pegah Zangeneh; Hamideh Abbasali; Samaneh Khoshghadam

== Medal table ==
Rank	Nation	Gold	Silver	Bronze	Total
1	Japan	5	3	3	11
2	China	3	4	2	9
3	Iran	3	2	4	9
4	South Korea	2	1	1	4
5	Malaysia	2	0	3	5
6	Kazakhstan	1	1	5	7
7	Pakistan	1	0	0	1
8	Vietnam	0	2	4	6
9	Hong Kong	0	2	0	2
10	Uzbekistan	0	1	1	2
11	United Arab Emirates	0	1	0	1
12	Indonesia	0	0	5	5
13	Chinese Taipei	0	0	2	2
13	Kuwait	0	0	2	2
13	Saudi Arabia	0	0	2	2
Totals (15 entries)		17	17	34	68
