= 2012 Asian Karate Championships =

Karate competition

- Host city: Tashkent, Uzbekistan
- Dates: 14–17 July 2012
- Main venue: Sport Complex Uzbekistan

The 2012 Asian Karate Championships are the 11th edition of the Senior Asian Karate Championships and 12th edition of the Cadet, Junior & U21 Asian Karate Championships and were held in Tashkent, Uzbekistan from July 14 to July 17, 2012.

== Medalists ==
=== Men ===
Event	Gold	Silver	Bronze
Individual kata	Leong Tze Wai; Malaysia	Itaru Oki; Japan	Chris Cheng; Hong Kong
Individual kata	Leong Tze Wai; Malaysia	Itaru Oki; Japan	Kuok Kin Hang; Macau
Team kata	Iran; Ahad Shahin; Armin Roshani; Farzad Mohammadkhanloo	Indonesia; Aswar; Fidelys Lolobua; Faisal Zainuddin	South Korea; Ahn Jun-seob; Choi Jae-moo; Park Hee-jun
Team kata	Iran; Ahad Shahin; Armin Roshani; Farzad Mohammadkhanloo	Indonesia; Aswar; Fidelys Lolobua; Faisal Zainuddin	Malaysia; Kam Kah Sam; Leong Tze Wai; Lim Chee Wei
Kumite −55 kg	Sun Jingchao; China	Loganeshaa Rao Ramarow; Malaysia	Imam Tauhid Ragananda; Indonesia
Kumite −55 kg	Sun Jingchao; China	Loganeshaa Rao Ramarow; Malaysia	Gu Ju-yeong; South Korea
Kumite −60 kg	Lee Ji-hwan; South Korea	Darkhan Assadilov; Kazakhstan	Shintaro Araga; Japan
Kumite −60 kg	Lee Ji-hwan; South Korea	Darkhan Assadilov; Kazakhstan	Saeid Alipour; Iran
Kumite −67 kg	Rinat Sagandykov; Kazakhstan	Mukhammadzaid Iminov; Uzbekistan	Saadi Abbas Jalbani; Pakistan
Kumite −67 kg	Rinat Sagandykov; Kazakhstan	Mukhammadzaid Iminov; Uzbekistan	Kim Do-won; South Korea
Kumite −75 kg	Ko Matsuhisa; Japan	Mohammad Al-Rifi; Jordan	Yermek Ainazarov; Kazakhstan
Kumite −75 kg	Ko Matsuhisa; Japan	Mohammad Al-Rifi; Jordan	Ahmad Al-Mesfer; Kuwait
Kumite −84 kg	Ali Fadakar; Iran	Rafat Al-Sheikh Ali; Syria	Mutasembellah Khair; Jordan
Kumite −84 kg	Ali Fadakar; Iran	Rafat Al-Sheikh Ali; Syria	Jang Min-soo; South Korea
Kumite +84 kg	Zabihollah Pourshab; Iran	Khalid Khalidov; Kazakhstan	Rustam Ashurov; Uzbekistan
Kumite +84 kg	Zabihollah Pourshab; Iran	Khalid Khalidov; Kazakhstan	Hideyoshi Kagawa; Japan
Team kumite	Japan; Shintaro Araga; Yoshihito Ide; Rikiya Iimura; Hideyoshi Kagawa; Ko Matsuhisa; Hiroto Shinohara; Daisuke Watanabe	Malaysia; Shaharudin Jamaludin; Teagarajan Kunasakaran; Kunasilan Lakanathan; Sharmendran Raghonathan; Loganeshaa Rao Ramarow; Senthil Kumaran Selvarajoo; Moenraj Sugumaran	Iran; Ebrahim Hassanbeigi; Nasser Najafi; Saeid Ahmadi; Saeid Farrokhi; Sajjad Ganjzadeh; Saman Heidari; Zabihollah Pourshab
Team kumite	Japan; Shintaro Araga; Yoshihito Ide; Rikiya Iimura; Hideyoshi Kagawa; Ko Matsuhisa; Hiroto Shinohara; Daisuke Watanabe	Malaysia; Shaharudin Jamaludin; Teagarajan Kunasakaran; Kunasilan Lakanathan; Sharmendran Raghonathan; Loganeshaa Rao Ramarow; Senthil Kumaran Selvarajoo; Moenraj Sugumaran	China; Cheng Fei; Cui Wenju; Dong Mingming; Li Haojie; Liu Zhe; Peng Hui; Zhang Yahao

=== Women ===
Event	Gold	Silver	Bronze
Individual kata	Rika Usami; Japan	Nguyễn Hoàng Ngân; Vietnam	Choi Ji-hye; South Korea
Individual kata	Rika Usami; Japan	Nguyễn Hoàng Ngân; Vietnam	Mahsa Afsaneh; Iran
Team kata	Japan; Suzuka Kashioka; Yoko Kimura; Miku Morioka	Iran; Elnaz Taghipour; Mahsa Afsaneh; Najmeh Ghazizadeh	Vietnam; Đỗ Thị Thu Hà; Nguyễn Thanh Hằng; Nguyễn Thị Hằng
Team kata	Japan; Suzuka Kashioka; Yoko Kimura; Miku Morioka	Iran; Elnaz Taghipour; Mahsa Afsaneh; Najmeh Ghazizadeh	Malaysia; Khaw Yee Voon; Lee Xin Yi; Thor Chee Yee
Kumite −50 kg	Nasrin Dousti; Iran	Hikaru Ono; Japan	Jang So-young; South Korea
Kumite −50 kg	Nasrin Dousti; Iran	Hikaru Ono; Japan	Sabina Zakharova; Kazakhstan
Kumite −55 kg	Miki Kobayashi; Japan	Fatemeh Chalaki; Iran	Lê Bích Phương; Vietnam
Kumite −55 kg	Miki Kobayashi; Japan	Fatemeh Chalaki; Iran	Ma Man Sum; Hong Kong
Kumite −61 kg	Yu Miyamoto; Japan	Madina Utelbayeva; Kazakhstan	Yamini Gopalasamy; Malaysia
Kumite −61 kg	Yu Miyamoto; Japan	Madina Utelbayeva; Kazakhstan	Niu Conghui; China
Kumite −68 kg	Yulanda Asmuruf; Indonesia	Pegah Zangeneh; Iran	Gao Mengmeng; China
Kumite −68 kg	Yulanda Asmuruf; Indonesia	Pegah Zangeneh; Iran	Mayumi Someya; Japan
Kumite +68 kg	Hamideh Abbasali; Iran	Emiko Honma; Japan	Yin Xiaoyan; China
Kumite +68 kg	Hamideh Abbasali; Iran	Emiko Honma; Japan	Dilfuza Akbarova; Uzbekistan
Team kumite	China; Gao Mengmeng; Niu Conghui; Shi Jianling; Yin Xiaoyan	Vietnam; Bùi Thị Ngân; Lăng Thị Hoa; Lê Bích Phương; Trần Hoàng Yến Phượng	Japan; Emiko Honma; Miki Kobayashi; Yu Miyamoto; Mayumi Someya
Team kumite	China; Gao Mengmeng; Niu Conghui; Shi Jianling; Yin Xiaoyan	Vietnam; Bùi Thị Ngân; Lăng Thị Hoa; Lê Bích Phương; Trần Hoàng Yến Phượng	Iran; Samaneh Khoshghadam; Pegah Zangeneh; Leila Bahrami; Hamideh Abbasali; Samira Malekipour

== Medal table ==
Rank	Nation	Gold	Silver	Bronze	Total
1	Japan	6	3	4	13
2	Iran	5	3	4	12
3	China	2	0	4	6
4	Kazakhstan	1	3	2	6
5	Malaysia	1	2	3	6
6	Indonesia	1	1	1	3
7	South Korea	1	0	6	7
8	Vietnam	0	2	2	4
9	Uzbekistan	0	1	2	3
10	Jordan	0	1	1	2
11	Syria	0	1	0	1
12	Hong Kong	0	0	2	2
13	Kuwait	0	0	1	1
13	Macau	0	0	1	1
13	Pakistan	0	0	1	1
Totals (15 entries)		17	17	34	68
