= Karate at the 2018 Asian Games =

Karate competition

- Venue: Jakarta Convention Center
- Dates: 25–27 August 2018
- Competitors: 186 from 34 nations

Karate at the 2018 Asian Games was held at the Jakarta Convention Center Plenary Hall, Jakarta, Indonesia, from 25 August to 27 August 2018.

== Schedule ==
P	Preliminary rounds & Repechage	F	Finals

Event↓/Date →	25th Sat		26th Sun		27th Mon	
Men's kata	P	F				
Men's kumite 60 kg			P	F		
Men's kumite 67 kg			P	F		
Men's kumite 75 kg					P	F
Men's kumite 84 kg					P	F
Men's kumite +84 kg	P	F				
Women's kata	P	F				
Women's kumite 50 kg					P	F
Women's kumite 55 kg			P	F		
Women's kumite 61 kg			P	F		
Women's kumite 68 kg					P	F
Women's kumite +68 kg	P	F				

== Medalists ==
=== Men ===
Event	Gold	Silver	Bronze
Kata	Ryo Kiyuna; Japan	Wang Yi-ta; Chinese Taipei	Ahmad Zigi Zaresta Yuda; Indonesia
Kata	Ryo Kiyuna; Japan	Wang Yi-ta; Chinese Taipei	Park Hee-jun; South Korea
Kumite −60 kg	Rifki Ardiansyah Arrosyiid; Indonesia	Amir Mehdizadeh; Iran	Prem Kumar Selvam; Malaysia
Kumite −60 kg	Rifki Ardiansyah Arrosyiid; Indonesia	Amir Mehdizadeh; Iran	Sadriddin Saymatov; Uzbekistan
Kumite −67 kg	Ali Al-Shatti; Kuwait	Didar Amirali; Kazakhstan	Abdelrahman Al-Masatfa; Jordan
Kumite −67 kg	Ali Al-Shatti; Kuwait	Didar Amirali; Kazakhstan	Jintar Simanjuntak; Indonesia
Kumite −75 kg	Bahman Asgari; Iran	Raef Al-Turkistani; Saudi Arabia	Hsu Wei-chun; Chinese Taipei
Kumite −75 kg	Bahman Asgari; Iran	Raef Al-Turkistani; Saudi Arabia	Bashar Al-Najjar; Jordan
Kumite −84 kg	Ryutaro Araga; Japan	Ahmad Al-Mesfer; Kuwait	Zabihollah Pourshab; Iran
Kumite −84 kg	Ryutaro Araga; Japan	Ahmad Al-Mesfer; Kuwait	Wu Chun-wei; Chinese Taipei
Kumite +84 kg	Sajjad Ganjzadeh; Iran	Nguyễn Minh Phụng; Vietnam	Tareg Hamedi; Saudi Arabia
Kumite +84 kg	Sajjad Ganjzadeh; Iran	Nguyễn Minh Phụng; Vietnam	Daniyar Yuldashev; Kazakhstan

=== Women ===
Event	Gold	Silver	Bronze
Kata	Kiyou Shimizu; Japan	Sou Soi Lam; Macau	Monsicha Tararattanakul; Thailand
Kata	Kiyou Shimizu; Japan	Sou Soi Lam; Macau	Grace Lau; Hong Kong
Kumite −50 kg	Gu Shiau-shuang; Chinese Taipei	Bakhriniso Babaeva; Uzbekistan	Miho Miyahara; Japan
Kumite −50 kg	Gu Shiau-shuang; Chinese Taipei	Bakhriniso Babaeva; Uzbekistan	Junna Tsukii; Philippines
Kumite −55 kg	Wen Tzu-yun; Chinese Taipei	Taravat Khaksar; Iran	Cok Istri Agung Sanistyarani; Indonesia
Kumite −55 kg	Wen Tzu-yun; Chinese Taipei	Taravat Khaksar; Iran	Wong Sok I Macau
Kumite −61 kg	Yin Xiaoyan; China	Rozita Alipour; Iran	Choi Wan Yu; Hong Kong
Kumite −61 kg	Yin Xiaoyan; China	Rozita Alipour; Iran	Barno Mirzaeva; Uzbekistan
Kumite −68 kg	Guzaliya Gafurova; Kazakhstan	Tang Lingling; China	Pegah Zangeneh; Iran
Kumite −68 kg	Guzaliya Gafurova; Kazakhstan	Tang Lingling; China	Kayo Someya; Japan
Kumite +68 kg	Ayumi Uekusa; Japan	Gao Mengmeng; China	Hamideh Abbasali; Iran
Kumite +68 kg	Ayumi Uekusa; Japan	Gao Mengmeng; China	Nargis Hameedullah; Pakistan

== Medal table ==
Rank	Nation	Gold	Silver	Bronze	Total
1	Japan (JPN)	4	0	2	6
2	Iran (IRI)	2	3	3	8
3	Chinese Taipei (TPE)	2	1	2	5
4	China (CHN)	1	2	0	3
5	Kazakhstan (KAZ)	1	1	1	3
6	Kuwait (KUW)	1	1	0	2
7	Indonesia (INA)	1	0	3	4
8	Uzbekistan (UZB)	0	1	2	3
9	Macau (MAC)	0	1	1	2
9	Saudi Arabia (KSA)	0	1	1	2
11	Vietnam (VIE)	0	1	0	1
12	Hong Kong (HKG)	0	0	2	2
12	Jordan (JOR)	0	0	2	2
14	Malaysia (MAS)	0	0	1	1
14	Pakistan (PAK)	0	0	1	1
14	Philippines (PHI)	0	0	1	1
14	South Korea (KOR)	0	0	1	1
14	Thailand (THA)	0	0	1	1
Totals (18 entries)		12	12	24	48

== Participating nations ==
A total of 186 athletes from 34 nations competed in karate at the 2018 Asian Games:

- Afghanistan (6)
- Brunei (1)
- Cambodia (2)
- China (8)
- Chinese Taipei (8)
- Hong Kong (7)
- India (2)
- Indonesia (8)
- Iran (8)
- Japan (8)
- Jordan (6)
- Kazakhstan (8)
- Kuwait (4)
- Kyrgyzstan (6)
- Laos (4)
- Macau (6)
- Malaysia (6)
- Mongolia (3)
- Nepal (8)
- North Korea (3)
- Pakistan (6)
- Palestine (4)
- Philippines (5)
- Qatar (3)
- Saudi Arabia (4)
- South Korea (8)
- Sri Lanka (6)
- Tajikistan (3)
- Thailand (8)
- Timor-Leste (5)
- United Arab Emirates (3)
- Uzbekistan (8)
- Vietnam (8)
- Yemen (3)
