= 2013 Asian Karate Championships =

Karate competition

- Host city: Dubai, United Arab Emirates
- Dates: 5–7 December 2013
- Main venue: Hamdan Sports Complex

The 2013 Asian Karate Championships are the 12th edition of the Senior Asian Karate Championships and 13th edition of the Cadet, Junior & U21 Asian Karate Championships and were held in Dubai, United Arab Emirates from December 5 to December 7, 2013.

== Medalists ==
=== Men ===
| Event | Gold | Silver | Bronze |
|---|---|---|---|
| Individual kata | Marwan Al-Maazmi; United Arab Emirates | Wang Yi-ta; Chinese Taipei | Ryo Kiyuna; Japan |
| Individual kata | Marwan Al-Maazmi; United Arab Emirates | Wang Yi-ta; Chinese Taipei | Lim Chee Wei; Malaysia |
| Team kata | Japan; Takumi Sugino; Takato Soma; Koji Arimoto | Iran; Armin Roshani; Ahad Shahin; Farzad Mohammadkhanloo | Kuwait; Mohammad Al-Mosawi; Salman Al-Mosawi; Mohammad Al-Qattan |
| Team kata | Japan; Takumi Sugino; Takato Soma; Koji Arimoto | Iran; Armin Roshani; Ahad Shahin; Farzad Mohammadkhanloo | Malaysia; Lim Chee Wei; Leong Tze Wai; Emmanuel Leong |
| Kumite −55 kg | Majid Hassannia; Iran | Abdullah Al-Harbi; Saudi Arabia | Cheung Kwan Lok; Hong Kong |
| Kumite −55 kg | Majid Hassannia; Iran | Abdullah Al-Harbi; Saudi Arabia | Sun Jingchao; China |
| Kumite −60 kg | Hamoun Derafshipour; Iran | Imad Al-Malki; Saudi Arabia | Shintaro Araga; Japan |
| Kumite −60 kg | Hamoun Derafshipour; Iran | Imad Al-Malki; Saudi Arabia | Wang Zhiwei; China |
| Kumite −67 kg | Rinat Sagandykov; Kazakhstan | Hiroto Shinohara; Japan | Saeid Ahmadi; Iran |
| Kumite −67 kg | Rinat Sagandykov; Kazakhstan | Hiroto Shinohara; Japan | Saadi Abbas Jalbani; Pakistan |
| Kumite −75 kg | Bahman Asgari; Iran | Saad Al-Rashidi; Kuwait | Meirambek Toleyev; Kazakhstan |
| Kumite −75 kg | Bahman Asgari; Iran | Saad Al-Rashidi; Kuwait | Yen Tzu-yao; Chinese Taipei |
| Kumite −84 kg | Ryutaro Araga; Japan | Zabihollah Pourshab; Iran | Igor Chikhmarev; Kazakhstan |
| Kumite −84 kg | Ryutaro Araga; Japan | Zabihollah Pourshab; Iran | Jaber Al-Zaabi; United Arab Emirates |
| Kumite +84 kg | Sajjad Ganjzadeh; Iran | Hideyoshi Kagawa; Japan | Sulaiman Al-Mulla; United Arab Emirates |
| Kumite +84 kg | Sajjad Ganjzadeh; Iran | Hideyoshi Kagawa; Japan | Ahmad Al-Mesfer; Kuwait |
| Team kumite | Iran; Mehdi Soltani; Saeid Hassanipour; Hamed Ziksari; Saman Heidari; Hossein Samandar; Zabihollah Pourshab; Sajjad Ganjzadeh | Kazakhstan; Yermek Ainazarov; Khalid Khalidov; Igor Chikhmarev; Meirambek Toleyev; Darkhan Assadilov; Andrey Aktauov; Rinat Sagandykov | Jordan; Mohammad Al-Rifi; Bashar Al-Najjar; Mahmoud Sajan; Mutasembellah Khair; Hatem Al-Dweik |
| Team kumite | Iran; Mehdi Soltani; Saeid Hassanipour; Hamed Ziksari; Saman Heidari; Hossein Samandar; Zabihollah Pourshab; Sajjad Ganjzadeh | Kazakhstan; Yermek Ainazarov; Khalid Khalidov; Igor Chikhmarev; Meirambek Toleyev; Darkhan Assadilov; Andrey Aktauov; Rinat Sagandykov | Kuwait; Hamad Al-Bather; Fahad Al-Saree; Abdullah Al-Nasser; Mohammad Al-Mejadi; Saad Al-Rashidi; Ahmad Al-Mesfer; Ali Al-Shatti |

=== Women ===
| Event | Gold | Silver | Bronze |
|---|---|---|---|
| Individual kata | Rimi Kajikawa; Japan | Đỗ Hà Mi; Vietnam | Mahsa Afsaneh; Iran |
| Individual kata | Rimi Kajikawa; Japan | Đỗ Hà Mi; Vietnam | Chien Hui-hsuan; Chinese Taipei |
| Team kata | Japan; Yoko Kimura; Miku Morioka; Suzuka Kashioka | Iran; Mahsa Afsaneh; Elnaz Taghipour; Najmeh Ghazizadeh | India; Ryena Gupta; Sweta Gupta; Erina Pal |
| Team kata | Japan; Yoko Kimura; Miku Morioka; Suzuka Kashioka | Iran; Mahsa Afsaneh; Elnaz Taghipour; Najmeh Ghazizadeh | Vietnam; Đỗ Hà Mi; Nguyễn Hà Giang; Lê Thị Yến |
| Kumite −50 kg | Li Hong; China | Chen Yen-hui; Chinese Taipei | Sahar Karaji; Iran |
| Kumite −50 kg | Li Hong; China | Chen Yen-hui; Chinese Taipei | Tsang Yee Ting; Hong Kong |
| Kumite −55 kg | Miki Kobayashi; Japan | Wen Tzu-yun; Chinese Taipei | Fatemeh Chalaki; Iran |
| Kumite −55 kg | Miki Kobayashi; Japan | Wen Tzu-yun; Chinese Taipei | Ma Man Sum; Hong Kong |
| Kumite −61 kg | Barno Mirzaeva; Uzbekistan | Anastassiya Oleshko; Kazakhstan | Delaram Dousti; Iran |
| Kumite −61 kg | Barno Mirzaeva; Uzbekistan | Anastassiya Oleshko; Kazakhstan | Chang Ting; Chinese Taipei |
| Kumite −68 kg | Tang Lingling; China | Pegah Zangeneh; Iran | Kayo Someya; Japan |
| Kumite −68 kg | Tang Lingling; China | Pegah Zangeneh; Iran | Nour Abusalah; Jordan |
| Kumite +68 kg | Hamideh Abbasali; Iran | Ayumi Uekusa; Japan | Paula Carion; Macau |
| Kumite +68 kg | Hamideh Abbasali; Iran | Ayumi Uekusa; Japan | Zeng Cuilan; China |
| Team kumite | Iran; Pegah Zangeneh; Hamideh Abbasali; Rozita Alipour; Delaram Dousti | China; Li Hong; Gao Mengmeng; Tang Lingling; Zeng Cuilan | Hong Kong; Tsang Yee Ting; Ma Man Sum; Chan Ka Man; Lee Ting Ting |
| Team kumite | Iran; Pegah Zangeneh; Hamideh Abbasali; Rozita Alipour; Delaram Dousti | China; Li Hong; Gao Mengmeng; Tang Lingling; Zeng Cuilan | Chinese Taipei; Chen Yen-hui; Wen Tzu-yun; Chang Ting; Chao Jou |

== Medal table ==
| Rank | Nation | Gold | Silver | Bronze | Total |
|---|---|---|---|---|---|
| 1 | Iran | 7 | 4 | 5 | 16 |
| 2 | Japan | 5 | 3 | 3 | 11 |
| 3 | China | 2 | 1 | 3 | 6 |
| 4 | Kazakhstan | 1 | 2 | 2 | 5 |
| 5 | United Arab Emirates | 1 | 0 | 2 | 3 |
| 6 | Uzbekistan | 1 | 0 | 0 | 1 |
| 7 | Chinese Taipei | 0 | 3 | 4 | 7 |
| 8 | Saudi Arabia | 0 | 2 | 0 | 2 |
| 9 | Kuwait | 0 | 1 | 3 | 4 |
| 10 | Vietnam | 0 | 1 | 1 | 2 |
| 11 | Hong Kong | 0 | 0 | 4 | 4 |
| 12 | Jordan | 0 | 0 | 2 | 2 |
| 12 | Malaysia | 0 | 0 | 2 | 2 |
| 14 | India | 0 | 0 | 1 | 1 |
| 14 | Macau | 0 | 0 | 1 | 1 |
| 14 | Pakistan | 0 | 0 | 1 | 1 |
| Totals (16 entries) | | 17 | 17 | 34 | 68 |
