= Choi Wan Yu =

Hong Kong karateka (born 1993)

Personal information
- Born: 5 April 1993 (age 33)

Sport
- Country: Hong Kong
- Sport: Karate
- Weight class: 61 kg
- Events: Kumite; Team kumite
Medal record
Women's karate
Representing Hong Kong
Asian Games
Bronze medal – third place	2018 Jakarta	Kumite 61 kg
Asian Championships
Silver medal – second place	2017 Astana	Kumite 61 kg
Bronze medal – third place	2022 Tashkent	Team kumite

Choi Wan Yu (born 5 April 1993) is a Hong Kong karateka. She won one of the bronze medals in the women's kumite 61 kg event at the 2018 Asian Games held in Jakarta, Indonesia.

At the 2017 Asian Karate Championships held in Astana, Kazakhstan, she won the silver medal in the women's kumite 61 kg event. In the final, she lost against Yin Xiaoyan of China.

In 2023, she competed in the women's kumite 55 kg event at the 2022 Asian Games held in Hangzhou, China.

== Achievements ==
Year	Competition	Venue	Rank	Event
2017	Asian Championships	Astana, Kazakhstan	2nd	Kumite 61 kg
2018	Asian Games	Jakarta, Indonesia	3rd	Kumite 61 kg
2022	Asian Championships	Tashkent, Uzbekistan	3rd	Team kumite
