= Samaneh =

Samaneh (Persian: سمانه, romanized: Samâneh, lit. 'Sky') is a feminine given name of Persian origin. Notable people with the name include:

- Samaneh Beyrami Baher (born 1991), Iranian cross-country skier
- Samaneh Chahkandi (born 1989), Iranian footballer
- Samaneh Khoshghadam (born 1983), Iranian karateka
- Samaneh Sheshpari (born 1987), Iranian taekwondo practitioner
