= 2015 Asian Karate Championships =

Karate competition

- Host city: Yokohama, Japan
- Dates: 4–6 September 2015
- Main venue: Yokohama Cultural Gymnasium

The 2015 Asian Karate Championships are the 13th edition of the Asian Karate Championships, and were held in Yokohama, Japan from September 4 to September 6, 2015.

== Medalists ==
=== Men ===
Event	Gold	Silver	Bronze
Individual kata	Ryo Kiyuna; Japan	Chris Cheng; Hong Kong	Mehran Ghorbanalipour; Iran
Individual kata	Ryo Kiyuna; Japan	Chris Cheng; Hong Kong	Lim Chee Wei; Malaysia
Team kata	Japan; Arata Kinjo; Ryo Kiyuna; Takuya Uemura	Malaysia; Thomson Hoe; Emmanuel Leong; Leong Tze Wai	Kuwait; Mohammad Al-Mosawi; Salman Al-Mosawi; Mohammad Bader
Team kata	Japan; Arata Kinjo; Ryo Kiyuna; Takuya Uemura	Malaysia; Thomson Hoe; Emmanuel Leong; Leong Tze Wai	Iran; Behnam Ghasemi; Jamshid Hosseini; Reza Khodashenas
Kumite −55 kg	Andrey Aktauov; Kazakhstan	Abdullah Shaaban; Kuwait	Taihei Hanaguruma; Japan
Kumite −55 kg	Andrey Aktauov; Kazakhstan	Abdullah Shaaban; Kuwait	Cheung Kwan Lok; Hong Kong
Kumite −60 kg	Amir Mehdizadeh; Iran	Liu Chung-chiang; Chinese Taipei	Shintaro Araga; Japan
Kumite −60 kg	Amir Mehdizadeh; Iran	Liu Chung-chiang; Chinese Taipei	Lee Chun Ho; Hong Kong
Kumite −67 kg	Rinat Sagandykov; Kazakhstan	Saeid Ahmadi; Iran	Ali Al-Shatti; Kuwait
Kumite −67 kg	Rinat Sagandykov; Kazakhstan	Saeid Ahmadi; Iran	Hiroto Gomyo; Japan
Kumite −75 kg	Yermek Ainazarov; Kazakhstan	Saad Al-Rashidi; Kuwait	Daisuke Watanabe; Japan
Kumite −75 kg	Yermek Ainazarov; Kazakhstan	Saad Al-Rashidi; Kuwait	Bader Al-Otaibi; Saudi Arabia
Kumite −84 kg	Ryutaro Araga; Japan	Mohammad Al-Mejadi; Kuwait	Ibrahim Nantumi; Saudi Arabia
Kumite −84 kg	Ryutaro Araga; Japan	Mohammad Al-Mejadi; Kuwait	Zabihollah Pourshab; Iran
Kumite +84 kg	Hideyoshi Kagawa; Japan	Sajjad Ganjzadeh; Iran	Ahmad Al-Mesfer; Kuwait
Kumite +84 kg	Hideyoshi Kagawa; Japan	Sajjad Ganjzadeh; Iran	Teerawat Kangtong; Thailand
Team kumite	Japan	Iran	Jordan
Team kumite	Japan	Iran	Thailand

=== Women ===
Event	Gold	Silver	Bronze
Individual kata	Kiyou Shimizu; Japan	Grace Lau; Hong Kong	Praifah Sitthiwong; Thailand
Individual kata	Kiyou Shimizu; Japan	Grace Lau; Hong Kong	Celine Lee; Malaysia
Team kata	Vietnam; Đỗ Thị Thu Hà; Nguyễn Hoàng Ngân; Nguyễn Thị Hằng	United Arab Emirates; Huda Ahmed; Salama Al-Akrawi; Munira Ali	Iran; Maedeh Nassiri; Parisa Rahmani; Mehri Yazdani
Team kata	Vietnam; Đỗ Thị Thu Hà; Nguyễn Hoàng Ngân; Nguyễn Thị Hằng	United Arab Emirates; Huda Ahmed; Salama Al-Akrawi; Munira Ali	Sri Lanka; D. R. E. Bopitige; Wathsala Ganewaththe; H. M. H. K. Hindagoda
Kumite −50 kg	Ayaka Tadano; Japan	Sahar Karaji; Iran	Trần Thị Khánh Vy; Vietnam
Kumite −50 kg	Ayaka Tadano; Japan	Sahar Karaji; Iran	Tsang Yee Ting; Hong Kong
Kumite −55 kg	Wen Tzu-yun; Chinese Taipei	Sabina Zakharova; Kazakhstan	Shiori Nakamura; Japan
Kumite −55 kg	Wen Tzu-yun; Chinese Taipei	Sabina Zakharova; Kazakhstan	Syakilla Salni; Malaysia
Kumite −61 kg	Yin Xiaoyan; China	Mayumi Someya; Japan	Shree Sharmini Segaran; Malaysia
Kumite −61 kg	Yin Xiaoyan; China	Mayumi Someya; Japan	Barno Mirzaeva; Uzbekistan
Kumite −68 kg	Kayo Someya; Japan	Guzaliya Gafurova; Kazakhstan	Elaheh Rezazadeh; Iran
Kumite −68 kg	Kayo Someya; Japan	Guzaliya Gafurova; Kazakhstan	Chao Jou; Chinese Taipei
Kumite +68 kg	Hamideh Abbasali; Iran	Gao Mengmeng; China	Gaukhar Chaikuzova; Kazakhstan
Kumite +68 kg	Hamideh Abbasali; Iran	Gao Mengmeng; China	Ayumi Uekusa; Japan
Team kumite	Japan	Chinese Taipei	China
Team kumite	Japan	Chinese Taipei	Malaysia

== Medal table ==
Rank	Nation	Gold	Silver	Bronze	Total
1	Japan	9	1	6	16
2	Kazakhstan	3	2	1	6
3	Iran	2	4	5	11
4	Chinese Taipei	1	2	1	4
5	China	1	1	1	3
6	Vietnam	1	0	1	2
7	Kuwait	0	3	3	6
8	Hong Kong	0	2	3	5
9	Malaysia	0	1	5	6
10	United Arab Emirates	0	1	0	1
11	Thailand	0	0	3	3
12	Saudi Arabia	0	0	2	2
13	Jordan	0	0	1	1
13	Sri Lanka	0	0	1	1
13	Uzbekistan	0	0	1	1
Totals (15 entries)		17	17	34	68
