= Gao Mengmeng =

Chinese karateka (born 1993)

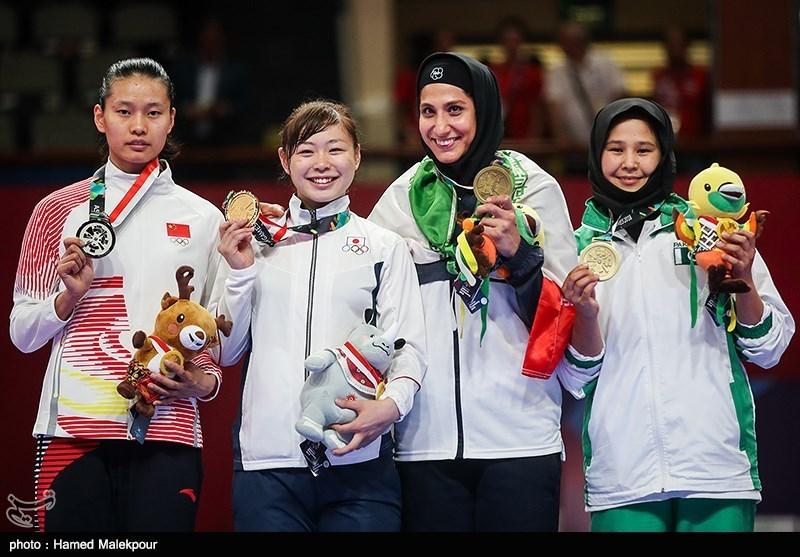
- Gao Mengmeng in 2018 (far left)

Personal information
- Born: 17 January 1993 (age 33)

Sport
- Country: China
- Sport: Karate
- Weight class: +68 kg
- Event: Kumite
Medal record
Women's karate
Representing China
Asian Games
Silver medal – second place	2018 Jakarta	Kumite +68 kg
Asian Championships
Gold medal – first place	2012 Tashkent	Team kumite
Silver medal – second place	2013 Dubai	Team kumite
Silver medal – second place	2015 Yokohama	Kumite +68 kg
Bronze medal – third place	2012 Tashkent	Kumite 68 kg
Bronze medal – third place	2017 Astana	Kumite +68 kg
Bronze medal – third place	2018 Amman	Team kumite
Bronze medal – third place	2019 Tashkent	Kumite +68 kg
Bronze medal – third place	2019 Tashkent	Team kumite

Gao Mengmeng (born 17 January 1993) is a Chinese karateka. She won the silver medal in the women's kumite +68 kg event at the 2018 Asian Games held in Jakarta, Indonesia.

At the 2019 Asian Karate Championships held in Tashkent, Uzbekistan, she won one of the bronze medals in the women's kumite +68 kg event. She also won the bronze medal in the women's team kumite event.

== Achievements ==
Year	Competition	Venue	Rank	Event
2012	Asian Championships	Tashkent, Uzbekistan	3rd	Kumite 68 kg
2012	Asian Championships	Tashkent, Uzbekistan	1st	Team kumite
2013	Asian Championships	Dubai, United Arab Emirates	2nd	Team kumite
2015	Asian Championships	Yokohama, Japan	2nd	Kumite +68 kg
2017	Asian Championships	Astana, Kazakhstan	3rd	Kumite +68 kg
2018	Asian Championships	Amman, Jordan	3rd	Team kumite
2018	Asian Games	Jakarta, Indonesia	2nd	Kumite +68 kg
2019	Asian Championships	Tashkent, Uzbekistan	3rd	Kumite +68 kg
2019	Asian Championships	Tashkent, Uzbekistan	3rd	Team kumite
