= Andrey Aktauov =

Kazakhstani karateka

Sport
- Country: Kazakhstan
- Sport: Karate
- Weight class: 55 kg
- Event: Kumite
Medal record
Men's karate
Representing Kazakhstan
Asian Games
| Gold medal – first place | 2014 Incheon | Kumite 55 kg |
Asian Championships
| Gold medal – first place | 2011 Quanzhou | Kumite 55 kg |
| Gold medal – first place | 2015 Yokohama | Kumite 55 kg |
| Gold medal – first place | 2017 Astana | Kumite 55 kg |
| Gold medal – first place | 2019 Tashkent | Kumite 55 kg |
| Gold medal – first place | 2021 Almaty | Kumite 55 kg |
| Silver medal – second place | 2013 Dubai | Team kumite |

Andrey Aktauov (Андрей Дастанович Актауов, born 14 September 1991) is a Kazakhstani karateka. He is five-time gold medalist in the men's kumite 55 kg event at the Asian Karate Championships. In 2014, he won the gold medal in the men's kumite 55 kg event at the 2014 Asian Games held in Incheon, South Korea.

== Career ==
At the 2019 Asian Karate Championships held in Tashkent, Uzbekistan, he won the gold medal in the men's kumite 55 kg event.
