= Mae Soriano =

Filipino karateka (born 1982)

Personal information
- Born: May 22, 1982 (age 44)

Sport
- Country: Philippines
- Sport: Karate
- Weight class: 55 kg
- Event: Kumite
Medal record
Women's karate
Representing Philippines
Event	1st	2nd	3rd
Asian Games	0	0	1
Asian Championships	0	0	1
Southeast Asian Games	0	2	7
Total	0	2	9
Asian Games
Bronze medal – third place	2014 Incheon	Kumite 55 kg
Asian Championships
Bronze medal – third place	2009 Foshan	Kumite 55 kg
Southeast Asian Games
Silver medal – second place	2007 Nakhon Ratchasima	Team kumite
Silver medal – second place	2013 Naypyidaw	Kumite 55 kg
Bronze medal – third place	2007 Nakhon Ratchasima	Kumite 53 kg
Bronze medal – third place	2011 Jakarta	Kumite 55 kg
Bronze medal – third place	2011 Jakarta	Team kumite
Bronze medal – third place	2017 Kuala Lumpur	Kumite 55 kg
Bronze medal – third place	2017 Kuala Lumpur	Team kumite
Bronze medal – third place	2019 Philippines	Kumite 55 kg
Bronze medal – third place	2021 Vietnam	Team kumite

Mae Soriano (born May 22, 1982) is a Filipino karateka. She won one of the bronze medals in the women's kumite 55 kg event at the 2014 Asian Games held in Incheon, South Korea. She also competed at the Asian Games in 2006, 2010 and 2018.

Soriano lost her bronze medal match in her event at the 2009 Asian Martial Arts Games held in Bangkok, Thailand. Soriano won one of the bronze medals in the women's kumite 55 kg event at the 2009 Asian Karate Championships held in Foshan, China.

Soriano won one of the bronze medals in the women's kumite 55 kg event at the 2017 Southeast Asian Games held in Kuala Lumpur, Malaysia. She also won one of the bronze medals in her event at the 2019 Southeast Asian Games held in the Philippines. She won one of the bronze medals in the women's team kumite event at the 2021 Southeast Asian Games held in Hanoi, Vietnam.

She is from Bacolod City in Negros Occidental, Philippines.

== Achievements ==
Year	Competition	Venue	Rank	Event
2007	Southeast Asian Games	Nakhon Ratchasima, Thailand	3rd	Kumite 53 kg
2007	Southeast Asian Games	Nakhon Ratchasima, Thailand	2nd	Team kumite
2009	Asian Championships	Foshan, China	3rd	Kumite 55 kg
2011	Southeast Asian Games	Jakarta, Indonesia	3rd	Kumite 55 kg
2011	Southeast Asian Games	Jakarta, Indonesia	3rd	Team kumite
2013	Southeast Asian Games	Naypyidaw, Myanmar	2nd	Kumite 55 kg
2014	Asian Games	Incheon, South Korea	3rd	Kumite 55 kg
2017	Southeast Asian Games	Kuala Lumpur, Malaysia	3rd	Kumite 55 kg
2017	Southeast Asian Games	Kuala Lumpur, Malaysia	3rd	Team kumite
2019	Southeast Asian Games	Manila, Philippines	3rd	Kumite 55 kg
2022	Southeast Asian Games	Hanoi, Vietnam	3rd	Team kumite
