= Saadi Abbas Jalbani =

Pakistani karateka (born 1988)

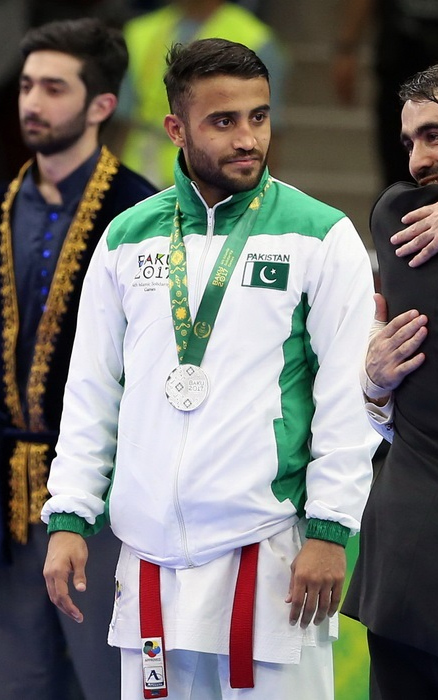
- Saadi Abbas Jalbani at the 2017 Islamic Solidarity Games in Baku

Personal information
- Born: 1988 (age 37–38) Lyari Town, Karachi, Pakistan
- Height: 1.75 m (5 ft 9 in)
- Weight: −75 kg (−165 lb)

Sport
- Sport: Karate
- Club: Al-Ittihad Kalba SC WAPDA
Medal record
Representing Pakistan
Islamic Solidarity Games
Silver medal – second place	2017 Baku	Kumite, -75 kg
Asian Karate Championships
Gold medal – first place	2011 Quanzhou	Kumite, -67 kg
Bronze medal – third place	2012 Tashkent	Kumite, -67 kg
Bronze medal – third place	2013 Dubai	Kumite, -67 kg
Commonwealth Karate Championships
Gold medal – first place	2009 Johannesburg	Kumite
Gold medal – first place	2013 Montreal	Kumite
US Open Karate Championships
Gold medal – first place	2014 Las Vegas	Kumite
South Asian Karate Championships
Gold medal – first place	2012 New Delhi	Kumite
Gold medal – first place	2017 Colombo	Kumite
South Asian Games
Gold medal – first place	2006 Colombo	Kumite
Silver medal – second place	2010 Dhaka	Kumite
Gold medal – first place	2019 Khatmandu	Kumite
UAE Karate Championships
Gold medal – first place	2017 UAE President Karate Championship	Kumite
Gold medal – first place	2018 UAE President Cup	Kumite
Gold medal – first place	2018 UAE Karate League	Kumite
Gold medal – first place	2018 UAE Open Karate Championship	Kumite
Gold medal – first place	2019 UAE Open Karate Championship	Kumite

Saadi Abbas Jalbani (born 1 January 1988 in Karachi) is a Pakistani karate competitor and captain of Pakistan National Karate team. In 2011, Saadi became the first ever Asian Champion from South Asian region at the 2011 Asian Championships in Quanzhou, China.

== Biography ==
Jalbani was born in 1988 in Lyari Town Karachi South. He started Karate in 1996 when he was 7 years old, Saadi has earned a black belt in karate on 15 April 2001. In 2018, he became the captain of Pakistan National Karate Team and joined WAPDA Karate team in 2007 As of 2014, he was the only karate competitor from South Asia who has won a gold medal at an Asian Karate Championship.
