= Darkhan Assadilov =

Kazakhstani karateka (born 1987)

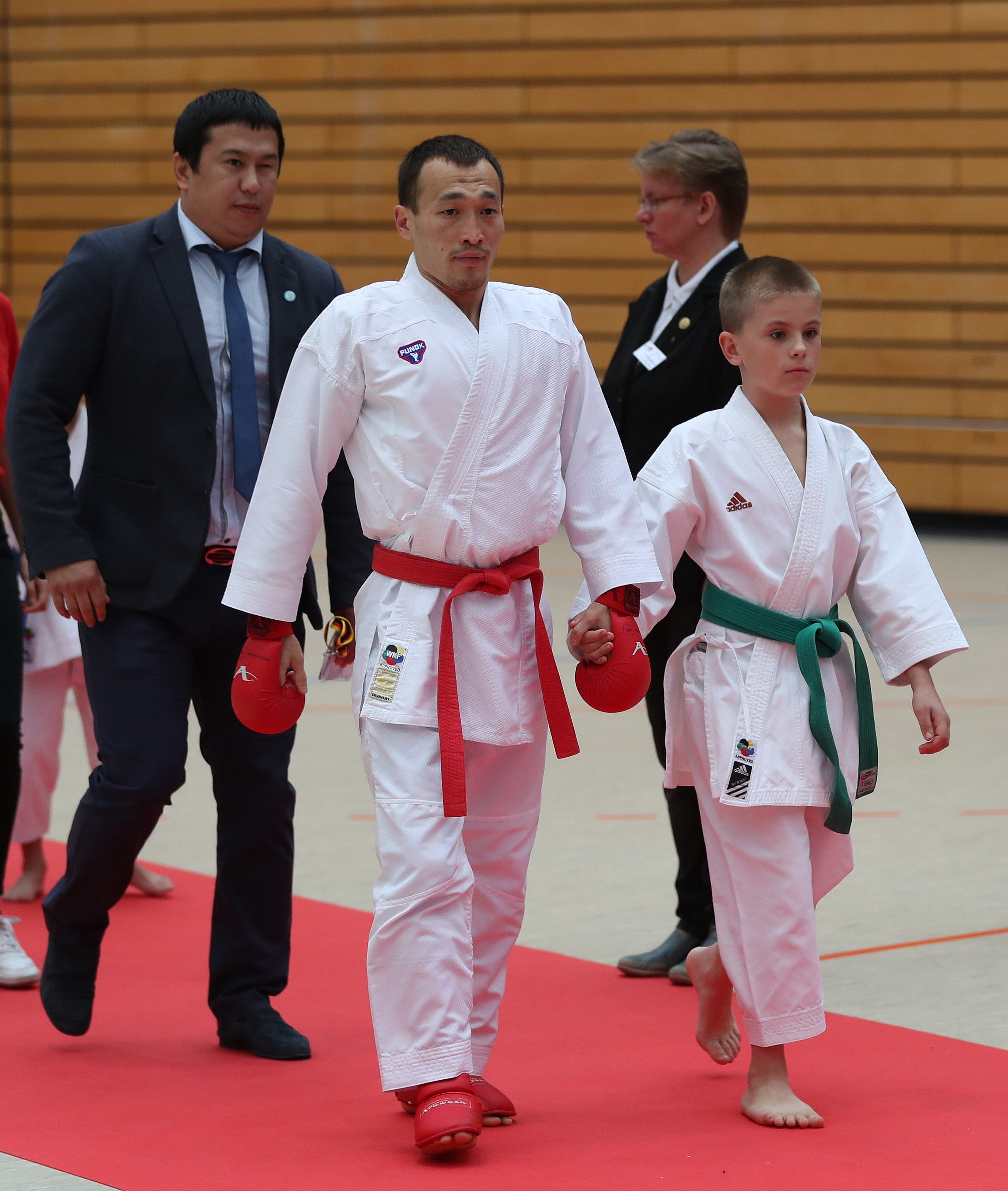
- Assadilov (wearing red belt) in 2018

Personal information
- Born: August 8, 1987 (age 38) Saryagash, Kazakh SSR, Soviet Union
- Height: 167 cm (5 ft 6 in)

Sport
- Country: Kazakhstan
- Sport: Karate
- Weight class: 60 kg
- Events: Kumite; Team kumite
Medal record
Men's karate
Representing Kazakhstan
Olympic Games
Bronze medal – third place	2020 Tokyo	Kumite 67 kg
World Championships
Silver medal – second place	2008 Tokyo	Kumite 60 kg
Bronze medal – third place	2018 Madrid	Kumite 60 kg
Asian Games
Gold medal – first place	2010 Guangzhou	Kumite 60 kg
Asian Championships
Silver medal – second place	2011 Quanzhou	Kumite 60 kg
Silver medal – second place	2012 Tashkent	Kumite 60 kg
Silver medal – second place	2013 Dubai	Team kumite
Bronze medal – third place	2009 Foshan	Kumite 60 kg
Bronze medal – third place	2011 Quanzhou	Team kumite
Bronze medal – third place	2017 Astana	Kumite 60 kg
Asian Martial Arts Games
Bronze medal – third place	2009 Bangkok	Kumite 60 kg

Darkhan Assadilov (born 8 August 1987) is a Kazakhstani karateka. He won one of the bronze medals in the men's 67 kg event at the 2020 Summer Olympics held in Tokyo, Japan. In 2010, he won the gold medal in the men's kumite 60 kg event at the Asian Games held in Guangzhou, China.

Assadilov is also a two-time medalist at the World Karate Championships.

== Career ==
In 2009, Assadilov competed in the men's kumite 60 kg at the World Games held in Kaohsiung, Taiwan without winning a medal. He won one match, drew one match and lost one match and he did not advance to the knock-out stage.

At the Asian Games he competed in the men's kumite 60 kg event in 2014 and in that event in 2018 without winning a medal.

In 2018, Assadilov won one of the bronze medals in the men's kumite 60 kg event at the World Karate Championships held in Madrid, Spain.

In 2020, Assadilov qualified to represent Kazakhstan in karate at the 2020 Summer Olympics in Tokyo, Japan. He won one of the bronze medals in the men's 67 kg event.

Assadilov competed in the men's kumite 60 kg event at the 2022 World Games held in Birmingham, United States. He finished in third place in his pool in the elimination round and he did not advance to the semi-finals.

== Achievements ==
Year	Competition	Venue	Rank	Event
2008	World Championships	Tokyo, Japan	2nd	Kumite 60 kg
2009	Asian Championships	Foshan, China	3rd	Kumite 60 kg
2010	Asian Games	Guangzhou, China	1st	Kumite 60 kg
2011	Asian Championships	Quanzhou, China	2nd	Kumite 60 kg
2011	Asian Championships	Quanzhou, China	3rd	Team kumite
2012	Asian Championships	Tashkent, Uzbekistan	2nd	Kumite 60 kg
2013	Asian Championships	Dubai, United Arab Emirates	2nd	Team kumite
2017	Asian Championships	Astana, Kazakhstan	3rd	Kumite 60 kg
2018	World Championships	Madrid, Spain	3rd	Kumite 60 kg
2021	Summer Olympics	Tokyo, Japan	3rd	Kumite 67 kg
