= Alireza Hashemzade =

Iranian karateka

Ali Reza Hashemzadeh
Personal information
- Full name: Ali Reza Hashemzadeh
- Born: 12 September 1995 (age 30) Gonbad-e Kavus, Iran
- Occupation: Karateka
- Height: 1.91 m (6 ft 3 in)

Alireza Hashemzade (Persian علیرضا هاشم زاده), is an Iranian karateka and member of the Iranian national karate team and a gold medalist in karate at the 2018 Asian Games.

Hashemzade started karate professionally in 2010 and after 10 months he was invited to the Iranian National Youth Karate Team. In his first international competition, he went to Turkey with the national youth team, where he won two team and individual gold medals. In 2016, he was appointed as Iran's cultural and sports ambassador to China. Alireza Hashemzade won a bronze medal at the 2012 Malaysian Youth Grand Prix. He won a gold medal at the 2018 Uzbekistan Asian Senior Karate Championships and the 2013 Turkey Individual Grand Prix.
