= Bahman Asgari =

Iranian karate athlete (born 1991)

Bahman Asgari Goncheh
Personal information
- Born: 21 December 1991 (age 34) Alvand, Qazvin, Iran
- Education: physical education

Sport
- Country: Iran
- Sport: Karate
- Weight class: 75 kg
- Event: Kumite
Medal record
Representing Iran
World Championships
Gold medal – first place	2018 Madrid	-75 kg kumite
Gold medal – first place	2018 Madrid	Team kumite
Gold medal – first place	2016 Linz	Team kumite
Gold medal – first place	2014 Bremen	Team kumite
Asian Games
Gold medal – first place	2018 Jakarta	-75 kg kumite
Asian Championships
Gold medal – first place	2013 Dubai	-75 kg kumite
Gold medal – first place	2018 Amman	Team kumite
Gold medal – first place	2017 Astana	-75 kg kumite
Gold medal – first place	2017 Astana	Team kumite
Silver medal – second place	2015 Yokohama	Team kumite
Silver medal – second place	2023 Malacca	-75 kg kumite
Silver medal – second place	2026 Bali	Team kumite
Bronze medal – third place	2019 Tashkent	-75 kg kumite
Karate1 Premier League
Silver medal – second place	2022 Baku	-75kg kumite
Gold medal – first place	2020 Salzburg	-75kg kumite
Bronze medal – third place	2020 Dubai	-75kg kumite
Gold medal – first place	2020 Paris	-75kg kumite
Gold medal – first place	2020 Santiago	-75kg kumite
Bronze medal – third place	2019 Moscow	-75kg kumite
Bronze medal – third place	2019 Tokyo	-75kg kumite
Silver medal – second place	2019 Shanghai	-75kg kumite
Gold medal – first place	2019 Stanbul	-75kg kumite
Bronze medal – third place	2019 Salzburg	-75kg kumite
Gold medal – first place	2019 Dubai	-75kg kumite
Silver medal – second place	2018 Stanbul	-75kg kumite
Silver medal – second place	2018 Rotterdam	-75kg kumite
Bronze medal – third place	2018 Paris	-75kg kumite
Gold medal – first place	2017 Stanbul	-75kg kumite
Silver medal – second place	2017 Toledo	-75kg kumite
Silver medal – second place	2016 Dubai	-75kg kumite
Bronze medal – third place	2014 Stanbul	-75kg kumite
Gold medal – first place	2014 Jakarta	-75kg kumite
Gold medal – first place	2013 Stanbul	-75kg kumite

Bahman Asgari Ghoncheh (Persian: بهمن عسگری غنچه, born 21 December 1991) is an Iranian karateka athlete who won a gold medal at the 2018 World Karate Championships and at the 2018 Asian Games.

== 2020 Summer Olympics ==
Bahman Asgari was qualified for Tokyo through the World Karate Federation's (WKF) Olympic rankings in the 75 kg category. However, he has been banned for 12 months for using a "prohibited substance" by the World Karate Federation in July 2021 and he missed the 2020 Olympics.

== Achievements ==
Karate1 Premier League

- Silver Medal - 2022 Baku (AZE) - kumite 75 kg
- Gold Medal - 2020 Salzburg (AUT) - kumite 75 kg
- Bronze Medal - 2020 Dubai (UAE) - kumite 75 kg
- Gold Medal - 2020 Paris (FRA) - kumite 75 kg
- Gold Medal - 2020 Santiago (CHI) - kumite 75 kg
- Bronze Medal - 2019 Moscow (RUS) - kumite 75 kg
- Bronze Medal - 2019 Tokyo (JPN) - kumite 75 kg
- Silver Medal - 2019 Shanghai (CHN) - kumite 75 kg
- Gold Medal - 2019 Stanbul (TUR) - kumite 75 kg
- Bronze Medal - 2019 Salzburg (AUT) - kumite 75 kg
- Gold Medal - 2019 Dubai (UAE) - kumite 75 kg
- Silver Medal - 2018 Stanbul (TUR) - kumite 75 kg
- Silver Medal - 2018 Rotterdam (NED) - kumite 75 kg
- Bronze Medal - 2018 Paris (FRA) - kumite 75 kg
- Gold Medal - 2017 Stanbul (TUR) - kumite 75 kg
- Silver Medal - 2017 Toledo (ESP) - kumite 75 kg
- Silver Medal - 2016 Dubai (UAE) - kumite 75 kg
- Bronze Medal - 2014 Stanbul (TUR) - kumite 75 kg
- Gold Medal - 2014 Jakarta (INA) - kumite 75 kg
- Gold Medal - 2013 Stanbul (TUR) - kumite 75 kg
