= Karate at the 2014 Asian Games – Women's kumite 55 kg =

Karate competition

Women's kumite 55 kg at the 2014 Asian Games
- Venue: Gyeyang Gymnasium
- Date: 3 October 2014
- Competitors: 14 from 14 nations

Medalists
gold medal	Wen Tzu-yun	Chinese Taipei
silver medal	Sabina Zakharova	Kazakhstan
bronze medal	Mae Soriano	Philippines
bronze medal	Miki Kobayashi	Japan

The women's kumite 55 kilograms competition at the 2014 Asian Games in Incheon, South Korea was held on 3 October 2014 at the Gyeyang Gymnasium.

== Schedule ==
All times are Korea Standard Time (UTC+09:00)

Date	Time	Event
Friday, 3 October 2014	13:30	1/8 finals
Friday, 3 October 2014	13:30	Quarterfinals
Friday, 3 October 2014	13:30	Semifinals
Friday, 3 October 2014	13:30	Final of repechage
Friday, 3 October 2014	13:30	Finals

== Results ==
Legend

- H — Won by hansoku (8–0)
- K — Won by kiken (8–0)

=== Main bracket ===
1/8 finals
Ahn Tae-eun (KOR)	3
Aigerim Prieva (KGZ)	1
Sabina Zakharova (KAZ)	H
Cok Istri Agung Sanistyarani (INA)
Ma Man Sum (HKG)	2
Mae Soriano (PHI)	4
Nisha Alagasan (MAS)	1
Wen Tzu-yun (TPE)	5
Kim Myong-hwa (PRK)	0
Trần Hoàng Yến Phương (VIE)	8
Miki Kobayashi (JPN)	7
Samah Al-Najjar (JOR)	5

Quarterfinals
Ahn Tae-eun (KOR)	0
Sabina Zakharova (KAZ)	0
Mae Soriano (PHI)	11
Wong Sok I (MAC)	3
Wen Tzu-yun (TPE)	5
Trần Hoàng Yến Phương (VIE)	0
Miki Kobayashi (JPN)	5
Malika Thapa Chhetri (NEP)	0

Semifinals
Sabina Zakharova (KAZ)	6
Mae Soriano (PHI)	1
Wen Tzu-yun (TPE)	7
Miki Kobayashi (JPN)	7

Final
Sabina Zakharova (KAZ)	1
Wen Tzu-yun (TPE)	7

=== Repechage ===
Final of repechage
Cok Istri Agung Sanistyarani (INA)	2
Ahn Tae-eun (KOR)	1
Nisha Alagasan (MAS)	K
Trần Hoàng Yến Phương (VIE)

Bronze medal contest
Cok Istri Agung Sanistyarani (INA)	3
Mae Soriano (PHI)	11
Nisha Alagasan (MAS)	0
Miki Kobayashi (JPN)	1
