= Karate at the 2018 Asian Games – Women's kumite +68 kg =

Karate competition

Women's kumite +68 kg at the 2018 Asian Games
- Venue: Jakarta Convention Center
- Date: 25 August 2018
- Competitors: 7 from 7 nations

Medalists
gold medal	Ayumi Uekusa	Japan
silver medal	Gao Mengmeng	China
bronze medal	Hamideh Abbasali	Iran
bronze medal	Nargis Hameedullah	Pakistan

The women's kumite +68 kilograms competition at the 2018 Asian Games took place on 25 August 2018 at Jakarta Convention Center Plenary Hall, Jakarta, Indonesia.

== Schedule ==
All times are Western Indonesia Time (UTC+07:00)

Date	Time	Event
Saturday, 25 August 2018	14:00	Quarterfinals
Saturday, 25 August 2018	14:00	Semifinals
Saturday, 25 August 2018	17:00	Finals

== Results ==
=== Main bracket ===
Quarterfinals		Semifinals		Final
Nguyễn Thị Hồng Anh (VIE)	1
Ayumi Uekusa (JPN)	2	Ayumi Uekusa (JPN)	2
Hamideh Abbasali (IRI)	7	Hamideh Abbasali (IRI)	1
Aybibi Akhmedova (UZB)	0			Ayumi Uekusa (JPN)	5
Rita Karki (NEP)	0			Gao Mengmeng (CHN)	3
Gao Mengmeng (CHN)	3	Gao Mengmeng (CHN)	8
		Nargis Hameedullah (PAK)	0

=== Repechage ===
Bronze medals
Nguyễn Thị Hồng Anh (VIE)	0
Hamideh Abbasali (IRI)	3
Rita Karki (NEP)	1
Nargis Hameedullah (PAK)	3
