= Karate at the 2014 Asian Games – Men's kumite 55 kg =

Karate competition

Men's kumite 55 kg at the 2014 Asian Games
- Venue: Gyeyang Gymnasium
- Date: 3 October 2014
- Competitors: 16 from 16 nations

Medalists
gold medal	Andrey Aktauov	Kazakhstan
silver medal	Abdullah Al-Harbi	Saudi Arabia
bronze medal	Sun Jingchao	China
bronze medal	Senthil Kumaran Silvarajoo	Malaysia

The men's kumite 55 kilograms competition at the 2014 Asian Games in Incheon, South Korea was held on 3 October 2014 at the Gyeyang Gymnasium.

== Schedule ==
All times are Korea Standard Time (UTC+09:00)

Date	Time	Event
Friday, 3 October 2014	09:30	1/8 finals
Friday, 3 October 2014	09:30	Quarterfinals
Friday, 3 October 2014	09:30	Semifinals
Friday, 3 October 2014	09:30	Final of repechage
Friday, 3 October 2014	09:30	Finals

== Results ==
=== Main bracket ===
1/8 finals
Sun Jingchao (CHN)	7
Abdulla Shalwan (QAT)	0
Muhammad Kashif (PAK)	1
Nino Franco (PHI)	9
Andrey Aktauov (KAZ)	8
Teodoro Coli (TLS)	0
Mohd Fida'iy Hj Sanif (BRU)	8
Ali Al-Madhfari (YEM)	4
Abdullah Al-Harbi (KSA)	4
Suryadi (INA)	2
Cheung Kwan Lok (HKG)	5
Hsieh Cheng-kang (TPE)	2
Bijay Lama (NEP)	9
Song Yun-hak (PRK)	3
Senthil Kumaran Silvarajoo (MAS)	3
Gu Ju-yeong (KOR)	1

Quarterfinals
Sun Jingchao (CHN)	2
Nino Franco (PHI)	0
Andrey Aktauov (KAZ)	6
Mohd Fida'iy Hj Sanif (BRU)	2
Abdullah Al-Harbi (KSA)	6
Cheung Kwan Lok (HKG)	1
Bijay Lama (NEP)	0
Senthil Kumaran Silvarajoo (MAS)	7

Semifinals
Sun Jingchao (CHN)	0
Andrey Aktauov (KAZ)	7
Abdullah Al-Harbi (KSA)	8
Senthil Kumaran Silvarajoo (MAS)	0

Final
Andrey Aktauov (KAZ)	3
Abdullah Al-Harbi (KSA)	3

=== Repechage ===
Final of repechage
Teodoro Coli (TLS)	0
Mohd Fida'iy Hj Sanif (BRU)	8
Suryadi (INA)	5
Cheung Kwan Lok (HKG)	1

Bronze medal contest
Mohd Fida'iy Hj Sanif (BRU)	0
Sun Jingchao (CHN)	8
Suryadi (INA)	4
Senthil Kumaran Silvarajoo (MAS)	4
