= 2009 Asian Karate Championships =

Karate competition

- Host city: Foshan, China
- Dates: 25–27 September 2009
- Main venue: Nanhai Gymnasium

The 2009 Asian Karate Championships are the ninth edition of the Asian Karate Championships, and were held in Nanhai Gymnasium, Foshan, China from September 25 to September 27, 2009.

== Medalists ==
=== Men ===
Event	Gold	Silver	Bronze
Individual kata	Itaru Oki; Japan	Tan Chee Sheng; Malaysia	Chris Cheng; Hong Kong
Individual kata	Itaru Oki; Japan	Tan Chee Sheng; Malaysia	Davoud Shahcheraghi; Iran
Team kata	Japan	Iran	Indonesia
Team kata	Japan	Iran	Malaysia
Kumite −55 kg	Mohammad Ghasemi; Iran	Phạm Hoài Long; Vietnam	Imad Al-Malki; Saudi Arabia
Kumite −55 kg	Mohammad Ghasemi; Iran	Phạm Hoài Long; Vietnam	Ahmed Saif; Iraq
Kumite −60 kg	Mohammad Reza Ghoroubi; Iran	Mohd Fida'iy Hj Sani; Brunei	Donny Dharmawan; Indonesia
Kumite −60 kg	Mohammad Reza Ghoroubi; Iran	Mohd Fida'iy Hj Sani; Brunei	Darkhan Assadilov; Kazakhstan
Kumite −67 kg	Shinji Nagaki; Japan	Rinat Sagandykov; Kazakhstan	Hassan Ghaffari; Iran
Kumite −67 kg	Shinji Nagaki; Japan	Rinat Sagandykov; Kazakhstan	Abdullah Al-Otaibi; Kuwait
Kumite −75 kg	Saeid Farrokhi; Iran	Ko Matsuhisa; Japan	Shaharudin Jamaludin; Malaysia
Kumite −75 kg	Saeid Farrokhi; Iran	Ko Matsuhisa; Japan	Lee Ka Wai; Hong Kong
Kumite −84 kg	Nader Jodat; Iran	Satoshi Ibuchi; Japan	Hatta Mahamut; Malaysia
Kumite −84 kg	Nader Jodat; Iran	Satoshi Ibuchi; Japan	Xu Xiangwu; China
Kumite +84 kg	Zabihollah Pourshab; Iran	Kim Rak-won; South Korea	Umar Syarief; Indonesia
Kumite +84 kg	Zabihollah Pourshab; Iran	Kim Rak-won; South Korea	Amer Abu Afifeh; Jordan
Team kumite	Iran	Japan	Jordan
Team kumite	Iran	Japan	Kazakhstan

=== Women ===
Event	Gold	Silver	Bronze
Individual kata	Rika Usami; Japan	Nguyễn Hoàng Ngân; Vietnam	Lim Lee Lee; Malaysia
Individual kata	Rika Usami; Japan	Nguyễn Hoàng Ngân; Vietnam	Cheung Pui Si; Macau
Team kata	Japan	Vietnam	Hong Kong
Team kata	Japan	Vietnam	Malaysia
Kumite −50 kg	Li Hong; China	Chen Yen-hui; Chinese Taipei	Martinel Prihastuti; Indonesia
Kumite −50 kg	Li Hong; China	Chen Yen-hui; Chinese Taipei	Vũ Thị Nguyệt Ánh; Vietnam
Kumite −55 kg	Miki Kobayashi; Japan	Chen Dan; China	Mae Soriano; Philippines
Kumite −55 kg	Miki Kobayashi; Japan	Chen Dan; China	Vathana Gopalasamy; Malaysia
Kumite −61 kg	Wu Qiufeng; China	Chang Ting; Chinese Taipei	Yamini Gopalasamy; Malaysia
Kumite −61 kg	Wu Qiufeng; China	Chang Ting; Chinese Taipei	Bùi Thị Triều; Vietnam
Kumite −68 kg	Feng Lanlan; China	Jamaliah Jamaludin; Malaysia	Sofiya Kaspulatova; Uzbekistan
Kumite −68 kg	Feng Lanlan; China	Jamaliah Jamaludin; Malaysia	Ni Ni Cho Thae; Myanmar
Kumite +68 kg	Emiko Honma; Japan	Gaukhar Chaikuzova; Kazakhstan	Tang Lingling; China
Kumite +68 kg	Emiko Honma; Japan	Gaukhar Chaikuzova; Kazakhstan	Looi Lai Yan; Malaysia
Team kumite	Japan	Uzbekistan	Malaysia
Team kumite	Japan	Uzbekistan	China

== Medal table ==
Rank	Nation	Gold	Silver	Bronze	Total
1	Japan	8	3	0	11
2	Iran	6	1	2	9
3	China	3	1	3	7
4	Vietnam	0	3	2	5
5	Malaysia	0	2	9	11
6	Kazakhstan	0	2	2	4
7	Chinese Taipei	0	2	0	2
8	Uzbekistan	0	1	1	2
9	Brunei	0	1	0	1
9	South Korea	0	1	0	1
11	Indonesia	0	0	4	4
12	Hong Kong	0	0	3	3
13	Jordan	0	0	2	2
14	Iraq	0	0	1	1
14	Kuwait	0	0	1	1
14	Macau	0	0	1	1
14	Myanmar	0	0	1	1
14	Philippines	0	0	1	1
14	Saudi Arabia	0	0	1	1
Totals (19 entries)		17	17	34	68
