= Yin Xiaoyan =

Chinese karateka (born 1993)

Personal information
- Born: 28 August 1993 (age 32) Henan, China

Sport
- Country: China
- Sport: Karate
- Weight class: 61 kg
- Events: Kumite; Team kumite
Medal record
Women's karate
Representing China
Olympic Games
| Silver medal – second place | 2020 Tokyo | Kumite 61 kg |
Asian Games
| Gold medal – first place | 2018 Jakarta | Kumite 61 kg |
| Bronze medal – third place | 2014 Incheon | Kumite 61 kg |
World Championships
| Silver medal – second place | 2018 Madrid | Kumite 61 kg |
Asian Championships
| Gold medal – first place | 2011 Quanzhou | Team kumite |
| Gold medal – first place | 2012 Tashkent | Team kumite |
| Gold medal – first place | 2015 Yokohama | Kumite 61 kg |
| Gold medal – first place | 2017 Astana | Kumite 61 kg |
| Gold medal – first place | 2018 Amman | Kumite 61 kg |
| Gold medal – first place | 2019 Tashkent | Kumite 61 kg |
| Silver medal – second place | 2011 Quanzhou | Kumite 61 kg |
| Bronze medal – third place | 2012 Tashkent | Kumite +68 kg |
| Bronze medal – third place | 2018 Amman | Team kumite |

Yin Xiaoyan (尹 笑言, born 28 August 1993) is a Chinese karateka. She won the silver medal in the women's 61 kg event at the 2020 Summer Olympics in Tokyo, Japan. At the 2018 World Karate Championships in Madrid, Spain, she won the silver medal in the women's kumite 61 kg event.

== Career ==
She won one of the bronze medals in the women's 61 kg event at the 2016 World University Karate Championships held in Braga, Portugal.

In 2018, she won the gold medal in the women's kumite 61 kg event at the Asian Games held in Jakarta, Indonesia. In the final she defeated Rozita Alipour of Iran. Four years earlier, she won one of the bronze medals in the same event at the 2014 Asian Games held in Incheon, South Korea.

She represented China at the 2020 Summer Olympics in karate. She won the silver medal in the women's 61 kg event.

== Achievements ==
| Year | Competition | Venue | Rank | Event |
|---|---|---|---|---|
| 2011 | Asian Championships | Quanzhou, China | 1st | Team kumite |
| 2011 | Asian Championships | Quanzhou, China | 2nd | Kumite 61 kg |
| 2012 | Asian Championships | Tashkent, Uzbekistan | 1st | Team kumite |
| 2012 | Asian Championships | Tashkent, Uzbekistan | 3rd | Kumite +68 kg |
| 2014 | Asian Games | Incheon, South Korea | 3rd | Kumite 61 kg |
| 2015 | Asian Championships | Yokohama, Japan | 1st | Kumite 61 kg |
| 2017 | Asian Championships | Astana, Kazakhstan | 1st | Kumite 61 kg |
| 2018 | Asian Championships | Amman, Jordan | 1st | Kumite 61 kg |
| 2018 | Asian Championships | Amman, Jordan | 3rd | Team kumite |
| 2018 | Asian Games | Jakarta, Indonesia | 1st | Kumite 61 kg |
| 2018 | World Championships | Madrid, Spain | 2nd | Kumite 61 kg |
| 2019 | Asian Championships | Tashkent, Uzbekistan | 1st | Kumite 61 kg |
| 2021 | Summer Olympics | Tokyo, Japan | 2nd | Kumite 61 kg |
