= Sabina Zakharova =

Kazakhstani karateka (born 1992)

Sport
- Country: Kazakhstan
- Sport: Karate
- Event: Kumite
Medal record
Women's karate
Representing Kazakhstan
Asian Games
Silver medal – second place	2014 Incheon	Kumite 55 kg
Asian Karate Championships
Silver medal – second place	2015 Yokohama	Kumite 55 kg
Bronze medal – third place	2011 Quanzhou	Kumite 50 kg
Bronze medal – third place	2012 Tashkent	Kumite 50 kg
Bronze medal – third place	2017 Astana	Team kumite
Bronze medal – third place	2021 Almaty	Team kumite

Sabina Zakharova (Сабина Валерьевна Захарова, born 13 March 1992) is a Kazakhstani karateka. She won the silver medal in the women's kumite 55 kg event at the 2014 Asian Games held in Incheon, South Korea. She is also a five-time medalist at the Asian Karate Championships.

== Career ==
Zakharova competed in the women's kumite 55 kg event at the 2018 Asian Games held in Jakarta, Indonesia. She lost her first match against Wen Tzu-yun of Chinese Taipei and she was then eliminated in the repechage by Syakilla Salni of Malaysia.

In June 2021, Zakharova competed at the World Olympic Qualification Tournament held in Paris, France hoping to qualify for the 2020 Summer Olympics in Tokyo, Japan. She competed in the 61 kg weight class and she reached the round-robin stage of the tournament where she failed to qualify for the Summer Olympics. In November 2021, she competed in the women's 55 kg event at the World Karate Championships held in Dubai, United Arab Emirates.

== Achievements ==
Year	Competition	Venue	Rank	Event
2011	Asian Championships	Quanzhou, China	3rd	Kumite 50 kg
2012	Asian Championships	Tashkent, Uzbekistan	3rd	Kumite 50 kg
2014	Asian Games	Incheon, South Korea	2nd	Kumite 55 kg
2015	Asian Championships	Yokohama, Japan	2nd	Kumite 55 kg
2017	Asian Championships	Astana, Kazakhstan	3rd	Team kumite
2021	Asian Championships	Almaty, Kazakhstan	3rd	Team kumite
