= Karate at the 2009 World Games – Men's kumite 60 kg =

Karate competition

The men's 60 kg tournament in karate at the 2009 World Games was held on July 26 at the National Sun Yat-Sen University Gymnasium.

== Medalists ==
1st place, gold medalist(s)	Douglas Santos (BRA)
2nd place, silver medalist(s)	Hsia Wenhaung (TPE)
3rd place, bronze medalist(s)	Daniel Domdjoni (CRO)

== Round robin ==
=== Group A ===
Rank	Athlete	W	D	L
1	Daniel Domdjoni (CRO)	2	0	1
2	Keita Fujimoto (JPN)	1	1	1
3	Darkhan Assadilov (KAZ)	1	1	1
4	Hsieh Chengkang (TPE)	1	0	2

	CRO	JPN	KAZ	TPE
Domdjoni (CRO)		2–0	0–2	2–0
Fujimoto (JPN)	0–2		1–1	2–0
Assadilov (KAZ)	2–0	1–1		0–2
Hsieh (TPE)	0–2	0–2	2–0	

=== Group B ===
Rank	Athlete	W	D	L
1	Hsia Wenhaung (TPE)	2	1	0
2	Douglas Santos (BRA)	1	2	0
3	Tsuneari Yahiro (AUS)	1	0	2
4	Andrės Felipe Rendón (COL)	0	1	2

	TPE	BRA	AUS	COL
Hsia (TPE)		1–1	2–0	2–0
Santos (BRA)	1–1		2–0	1–1
Tsuneari (AUS)	0–2	0–2		2–0
Rendón (COL)	0–2	1–1	0–2	

== Knock-out stage ==
Semifinals
A2	Fujimoto (JPN)	4
B1	Hsia (TPE)	5
B2	Santos (BRA)	3
A1	Domdjoni (CRO)	1

Gold medal fight
B1	Hsia (TPE)	1
B2	Santos (BRA)	7
Bronze medal fight
A2	Fujimoto (JPN)	0
A1	Domdjoni (CRO)	8
