= Nargis Hameedullah =

Pakistani karateka (born 1998)

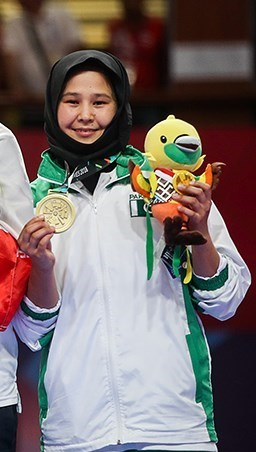
- Nargis Hameedullah in the Asian Games Karate Classification Competition, 2018
- Born: Nargis Hameed; December 15, 1998 (age 27); Quetta, Pakistan
- Occupation: Karateka
- Years active: 2017 - Present
- Known for: Gold Medal (2017 South Asian Championship); Bronze Medal (2018 Asian Games)

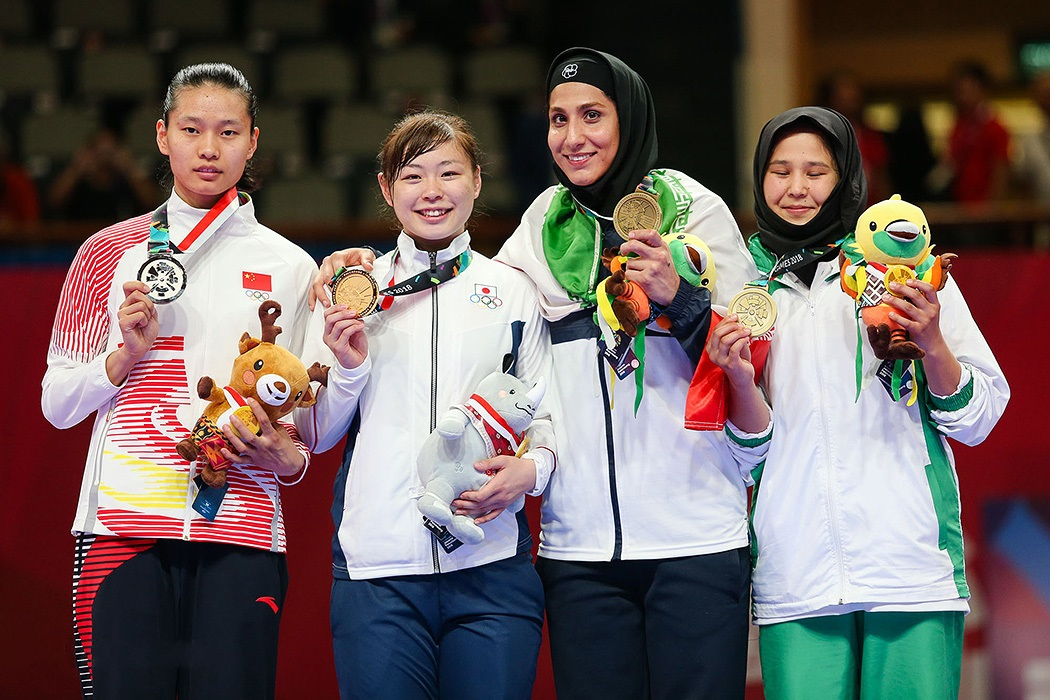
2018 Asian Games podium, Nargis in right

Nargis Hameedullah (Urdu: نرگس حمید اللہ; born 15 December 1998; Quetta, Pakistan) is a Pakistani karateka who won the bronze medal in the kumite +68 kg event at the 2018 Asian Games. This was the first ever medal for Pakistan in Asian Games karate competitions.

== Early life ==
Nargis was born in Quetta, Balochistan on 15 December 1998. She belongs to Quetta's Hazara community.

== Professional career ==
Nargis is the first female karate instructor of Quetta and has represented Pakistan internationally.

Nargis defeated Nepal's Karki Rita 3–1 in the match played for Bronze medals on 25 August 2018. Nargis won this bronze medal in over sixty-eight kilograms category competition. She won gold medal in the South Asian Championship in Colombo, Sri Lanka in 2017. She is also part of Pakistan Female Karate Association. She teaches karate to girls at a Quetta club and says "through karate, girls can defend themselves".
