= Karate at the 2018 Asian Games – Women's kumite 61 kg =

Karate competition

Women's kumite 61 kg at the 2018 Asian Games
- Venue: Jakarta Convention Center
- Date: 26 August 2018
- Competitors: 16 from 16 nations

Medalists
gold medal	Yin Xiaoyan	China
silver medal	Rozita Alipour	Iran
bronze medal	Choi Wan Yu	Hong Kong
bronze medal	Barno Mirzaeva	Uzbekistan

The women's kumite 61 kilograms competition at the 2018 Asian Games took place on 26 August 2018 at Jakarta Convention Center Plenary Hall, Jakarta, Indonesia.

== Schedule ==
All times are Western Indonesia Time (UTC+07:00)

Date	Time	Event
Sunday, 26 August 2018	14:00	1/8 finals
Sunday, 26 August 2018	14:00	Quarterfinals
Sunday, 26 August 2018	14:00	Semifinals
Sunday, 26 August 2018	14:00	Final of repechage
Sunday, 26 August 2018	17:00	Finals

== Results ==
Legend

- K — Won by kiken (8–0)

=== Main bracket ===
1/8 finals
Huda Jaber (JOR)	8
Tharika Samanmali (SRI)	0
Lucelia Fernandes (TLS)	0
Madina Utelbayeva (KAZ)	8
Shafiqa Mogul (AFG)	1
Hồ Thị Thu Hiền (VIE)	5
Choi Wan Yu (HKG)	0
Yin Xiaoyan (CHN)	2
Sunita Maharjan (NEP)	1
Arm Sukkiaw (THA)	4
Rozita Alipour (IRI)	5
Shin Su-jung (KOR)	0
Ko Ji-ryon (PRK)	0
Hsu Wei-ning (TPE)	1
Barno Mirzaeva (UZB)	K
Kymbat Toitonova (KGZ)

Quarterfinals
Huda Jaber (JOR)	1
Madina Utelbayeva (KAZ)	2
Hồ Thị Thu Hiền (VIE)	1
Yin Xiaoyan (CHN)	4
Arm Sukkiaw (THA)	0
Rozita Alipour (IRI)	3
Hsu Wei-ning (TPE)	0
Barno Mirzaeva (UZB)	3

Semifinals
Madina Utelbayeva (KAZ)	1
Yin Xiaoyan (CHN)	1
Rozita Alipour (IRI)	0
Barno Mirzaeva (UZB)	0

Final
Yin Xiaoyan (CHN)	0
Rozita Alipour (IRI)	0

=== Repechage ===
Final of repechage
Choi Wan Yu (HKG)	1
Hồ Thị Thu Hiền (VIE)	0
Shin Su-jung (KOR)	1
Arm Sukkiaw (THA)	3

Bronze medals
Choi Wan Yu (HKG)	2
Madina Utelbayeva (KAZ)	1
Arm Sukkiaw (THA)	1
Barno Mirzaeva (UZB)	2
