= Saeid Ahmadi =

Iranian karateka (born 1988)

Saeid Ahmadi Karyani
- Born: 2 October 1988 (age 38); Kermanshah, Iran
- Other name: Sniper
- Education: Azad University of Tehran
- Martial arts career
- Height: 181 cm (5 ft 11 in)
- Weight: 67 kg (148 lb; 10 st 8 lb)
- Style: Kumite
- Teacher: Touraj Sasani
- Rank: Black belt, 5th dan

Other information
- Occupation: Personal trainer
- Website: www.saeidahmadi.name

Saeid Ahmadi Karyani (Persian: سعید احمدی کریانی, also Romanized as "Sa'īd Ahmadī (Karyānī)"; born October 2, 1988 in Kermanshah) is an Iranian karateka and current professional personal trainer. He has participated in three world championships and he won two golds and a silver medal. He also won the silver medal in 2012 and 2014 and 2016 world championships.

He began karate training at age eight, with his first coach Touraj Sasani at Azadegan Karate Club and, from 2008 to 2011, won several medals of provincial and national karate. In 2012, he became a member of the Iran karate national team.

On 11 February 2026, Ahmadi signed a letter to the World Karate Federation with prominent Iranian karateka demanding the suspension of the Islamic Republic of Iran Karate Federation, and permitting Iranian karateka to compete independently in international competitions, in response to the government's crackdown of the 2025–2026 Iranian protests.

== See also ==
- Amir Mehdizadeh
- Sajad Ganjzadeh
- Bahman Asgari
- Samaneh Khoshghadam
