= Ali Fadakar =

Iranian karateka (born 1991)

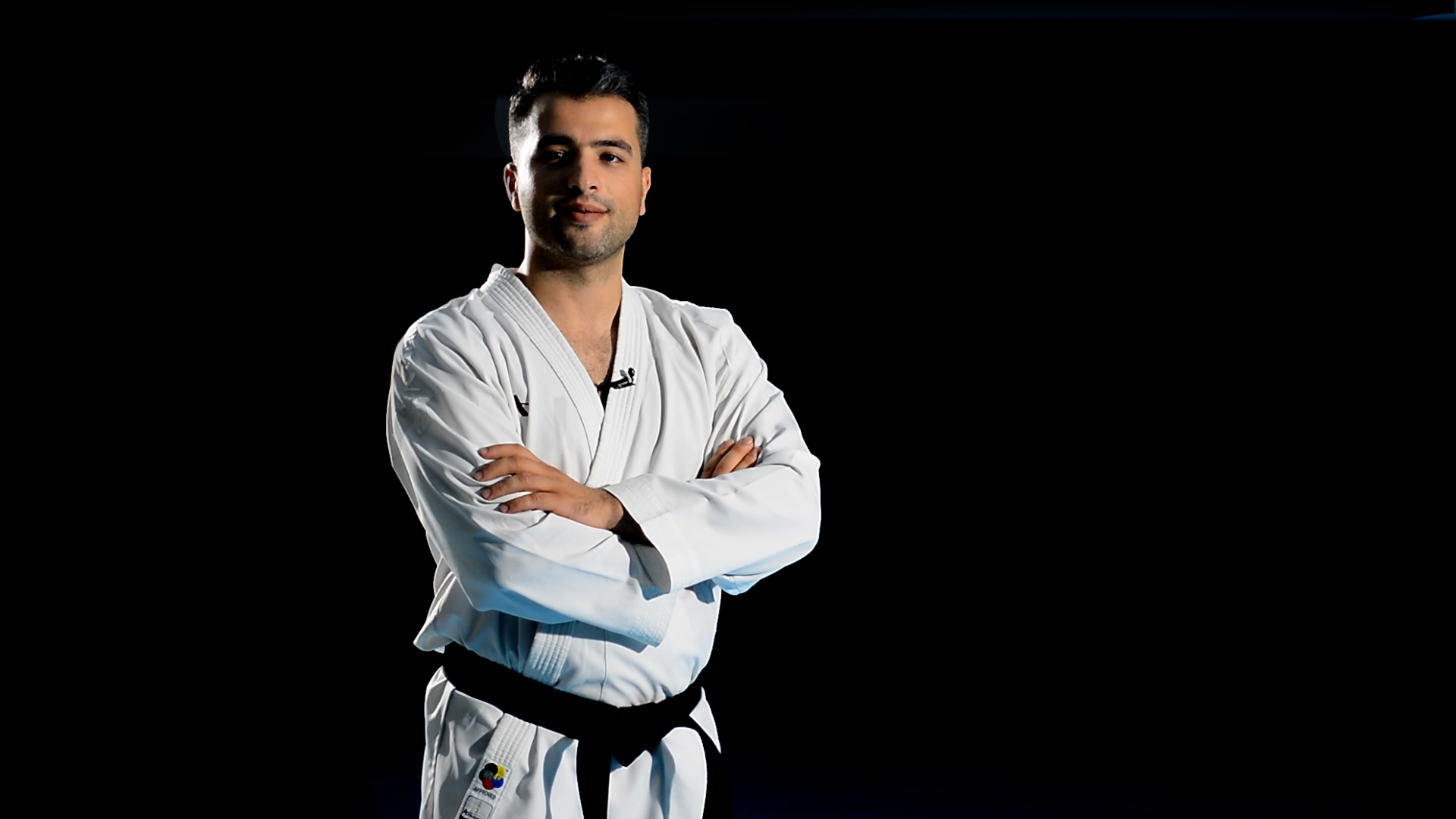
- Ali Fadkar in the club

Personal information
- Born: 26 November 1991 (age 34) Tehran, Iran
- Education: Tehran University, sport psychology
- Height: 181 cm (5 ft 11 in)
- Weight: 84 kg (185 lb)

Sport
- Sport: Karate
- Event: Kumite
Medal record
Men's Karate -84kg
Representing Iran
World Championships
Gold medal – first place	2016 Linz	Team kumite
Bronze medal – third place	2012 Paris	Team kumite
Asian Championships
Gold medal – first place	2012 Tashkent	Kumite −84 kg

Ali Fadakar (Persian: علی فداکار; born November 26, 1991) is an Iranian karateka. He began karate training at age 10, and after several champions of national karate championships, became a member of Iran's karate national team in 2008. He has won 3 gold medals of 2009, 2012 and 2016 Junior and Senior World karate championships.

== World Karate Championships ==
- Austria, 2016, 🥇Gold Medal (Iran Team kumite - seniors)
- Morocco, 2009, 🥇Gold Medal (-76 kg - Juniors )
- France, 2012, 🥉 Bronze Medal (Iran Team kumite - seniors)

== Asian Karate Championships ==
- Uzbekistan, 2012, 🥇Gold Medal (-84kg - Seniors )
- Uzbekistan, 2015, 🥇Gold Medal ( Azad University Kumite Team - Seniors)
- Hongkong, 2010, 🥉 Bronze Medal (+78 kg - Under 21)

== Karate 1 Premier League ==
- Indonesia, 2012,🥇 Gold Medal (-84 kg - Seniors)
- Dubai, 2019,🥈 Silver Medal (-84 kg - Seniors)
- Turkey, 2012, 🥈 Silver Medal (-84 kg - Seniors)
- Dubai, 2018, 🥈 Silver Medal (-84 kg - Seniors)
- Turkey, 2017, 🥉 Bronze Medal (-84 kg - Seniors)
- Japan, 2014,🥉 Bronze Medal (-84 kg - Seniors)

== International Karate Competitions ==
- Switzerland, 2016, 🥇Gold Medal ( -84 kg - Basel Open Cup)
- Iran, 2016, 🥇Gold Medal (-84 kg - The International Solidarity & Friendship Championships - Seniors)

== Academic Resume ==
- Master Of Sport Psychology, Tehran University
- Bachelor Of Sport Science And Physical Education, Tehran University
