= Helena Kuusisto =

Finnish karateka

Helena Ksenia Kuusisto (born November 6, 1992) is a Finnish karateka. She represents the Shotokan karate club in Pori, Finland.

Her trainer is Sade-Maria Pirttinen who previously coached karate champion Anssi Kaltevo.

== Career ==
Competing in the Women's +68 kg kumite, Kuusisto won the silver medal in the 2012 World Cup in Athens, as well as the Premier League bronze medals in Frankfurt, Germany, Istanbul, Turkey and Salzburg, Austria. In 2013, Kuusisto competed in the Young People's European Championships held in Konya, Turkey She won the Youth European Championship bronze medal for participants 18 to 20 years of age. In addition, she also won silver medals in several matches in the Premier League Competitions in Paris.

In 2014, Kuusisto won the general series of European Championship bronze in the +68 kg category. Kuusisto was also involved in the EM-silver speed, a women's team along with Emma Aronen, Melis Abatin and Henna Kuusisto. She has won the Finnish Open in her career (2008, 2009, 2011, 2012, 2013), as well as the Estonia Open (2010, 2012), Budapest Open (2010, 2011), Stockholm Open (2011), Latvia Open (2011) and the Czech Karate Euro GP (2013). Kuusisto won her first world title, most commonly won in northern European countries such as Finland, in the spring of 2012. She won gold in the PM-2013 and 2014. During her career she achieved a number of the most common series of Finnish championships, first in 2009 when she won at age 16 SM-gold and the women's + 68 kg in the women's open weight class. She has a number of young Finnish championships.

In the 2011 Youth World Championships in Malaysia, Kuusisto won the 5th place from 18 to 20 years in the +60 kg category. She has participated in the Junior World Championships in 2009. In the Youth Championship competitions, she has participated in 2010, 2011, 2012 and 2013. Kuusisto has also participated in a series of general European championships in 2011, 2012, 2013 and 2014.
