= Hamideh Abbasali =

Iranian karateka (born 1990)

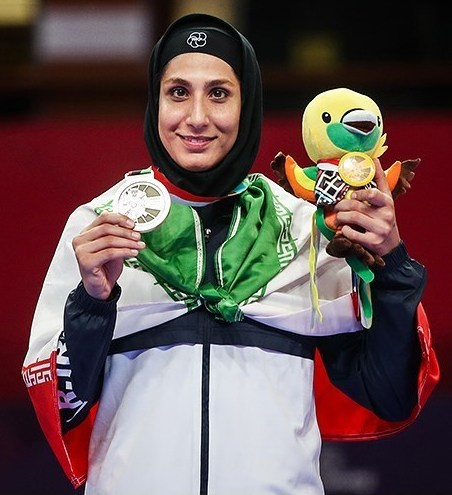
- Abbasali at Asian Games 2018

Personal information
- Born: 14 March 1990 (age 36) Rey, Tehran province, Iran
- Education: Physical education
- Height: 1.80 m (5 ft 11 in)
- Weight: 72 kg (159 lb)

Sport
- Event: Kumite
- College team: Islamic Azad University
- Club: Al-Ahli, UAE (2014); Al-Yarmouk, Kuwait (2014)
- Coached by: Samaneh Khoshghadam
Medal record
Women's karate
Representing Iran
World Championships
Silver medal – second place	2014 Bremen	+68 kg
Bronze medal – third place	2016 Linz	+68 kg
Asian Games
Gold medal – first place	2014 Incheon	+68 kg
Bronze medal – third place	2018 Jakarta	+68 kg
World Games
Silver medal – second place	2017 Wrocław	+68 kg
Asian Championships
Gold medal – first place	2012 Tashkent	+68 kg
Gold medal – first place	2013 Dubai	+68 kg
Gold medal – first place	2013 Dubai	Team
Gold medal – first place	2015 Yokohama	+68 kg
Gold medal – first place	2017 Astana	Team
Gold medal – first place	2018 Amman	+68 kg
Gold medal – first place	2019 Tashkent	+68 kg
Gold medal – first place	2019 Tashkent	Team
Silver medal – second place	2011 Guangzhou	+68 kg
Bronze medal – third place	2011 Guangzhou	Team
Bronze medal – third place	2012 Tashkent	Team

Hamideh Abbasali (Persian: حمیده عباسعلی, also Romanized as "Hamīdeh ’Abbās’alī"; born 14 March 1990 in Rey) is an Iranian karateka.

She won the silver medal in the 2014 world karate championships held in Bremen, Germany, losing the final against Shima Abouzeyd from Egypt in kumite +68 category. In 2016, she attended world karate championships 2016, which were held in Linz Austria, and she won bronze medal. At Islamic Solidarity Games in palembang kunite +68 she won a gold medal

Abbasali competed at the postponed 2020 Summer Olympics. She competed in the women's +61 kg event.

== Personal life ==
On 8 February 2026, Abbasali reacted to the arrest of fellow world karate champion Jasem Vishkaei for supporting the 2025–2026 Iranian protests, writing to the World Karate Federation on her Instagram stating that Vishkaei was at risk of torture.
