= Asian Karate Federation =

Governing body of karate

- Jurisdiction: Asian Continental countries/regions
- Membership: 39 Affiliated Countries
- Abbreviation: AKF
- Founded: 1973
- Headquarters: Headquarters of the AKF is situated in the country/region the elected President resides.
- Location: Asia
- President: Major Gen Nasser Al Sayed Abdulrazak Alrazooqi of United Arab Emirates

Official website
- asiankaratefederation.net

The Asian Karate Federation (AKF) is the governing body of sport karate of about 44 countries of karatedo federation in Asia. The AKF is a non-profit organization and performs its activities on an amateur basis in compliance with the principles set forth in the Olympic Charter, duly recognized by the World Karate Federation, the largest international governing body of sport karate with over 198 member countries. It is the only karate organization recognised by the International Olympic Committee and has more than fifty million members. The AKF organizes the Asian Karatedo Championships, the Junior and Senior AKF Championships in every two years in between the Olympic and Asian Games and participates in WKF World Karate Championships. The current president of the Asian Karate Federation (AKF) is Major Gen Nasser Al Sayed Abdulrazak Alrazooqi of UAE and Mr. Kuong Im Che of Macau, China, serves as the secretary general.

== History of AKF ==
Asian Karatedo Federation founded as APUKO (Asian Pacific Union of Karatedo Organizations) in the year 1973.

It changed to AUKO (Asian Union of Karatedo Organizations) in 1992 after WUKO was admitted to IOC.

The name was changed again in 1999 to AKF (Asian Karatedo Federation) in line with World Union of Karate-Do Organizations (WUKO) changed to World Karate Federation (WKF).

== AKF Country Member's Federations ==
- Asian Karate Federation (AKF) Affiliated Countries:
- Afghanistan
- Bangladesh
- Bahrain
- Bhutan
- Brunei
- Cambodia
- China
- Hong Kong
- Indonesia
- India
- Iraq
- Iran
- Jordan
- Japan
- Kazakhstan
- (South Korea) Korea
- Kuwait
- Kyrgyzstan
- (Laos) Lao PDR
- Lebanon
- Macau
- Malaysia
- Mongolia
- Myanmar
- Nepal
- Oman
- Pakistan
- Philippines
- (North Korea) DPR Korea
- Qatar
- Saudi Arabia
- Singapore
- Sri Lanka
- Syria
- Thailand
- Tajikistan
- Timor-Leste
- Chinese Taipei
- Turkmenistan
- United Arab Emirates
- Uzbekistan
- Vietnam
- Yemen
