= Rika Usami =

Japanese karateka (born 1986)

- Born: February 20, 1986 (age 40); Tokyo, Japan
- Native name: 宇佐美里香
- Nationality: Japanese
- Style: Shitō-ryū
- Trainer: Yoshimi Inoue

Other information
- University: Kokushikan University

Rika Usami
Medal record

Women's karate

Representing Japan

World Karate Championships
Gold medal – first place	Paris 2012	
Bronze medal – third place	Belgrade 2010	

Asian Games
Gold medal – first place	Guangzhou 2010	

Rika Usami (宇佐美 里香, Usami Rika; born February 20, 1986) is a Japanese karateka. She won a Gold medal in individual kata at the 2012 World Karate Championships after previously winning Bronze at the 2010 Championships. She also won Gold in the same category at the 2010 Asian Games. As of March 2021, Usami is coaching the karate team at Kokushikan University.

== Early life ==
Usami was born on February 20, 1986, in Tokyo, Japan. She had said in an interview that she started karate when she was 10 years old by joining a Goju-ryu-style dojo located near her family's house in Tokyo, after seeing a female fighter on television. Her older brother had been practicing karate and let Usami wear his karate gi on occasions, resulting in helping her a lot when she decided to eventually start practicing karate herself.

Usami's first karate tournament was when she was a green belt at 12 years old in elementary school. Usami did not participate in major tournaments until age 15 and won her first tournament at 17 years old at the All Japan High School Karatedo Championships.

== Achievements ==
Year	Competition	Venue	Rank	Event
2003	30th Japan National High School Karatedo Championships	Sasebo	1st	
2005	4th World Junior & Cadet Karatedo Championships	Cyprus	1st	
2006	8th Asian Junior & Cadet Karatedo Championships	Singapore	1st	
2007	35th Japan Cup Karatedo Championships		1st	Individual kata
2007	51st All Japan Universities' Karatedo Championship		1st	Individual kata
2007	36th Japan Cup Karatedo Championships		2nd	Individual kata
2008	37th Japan Cup Karatedo Championships		1st	Individual kata
2009	Asian Karate Championships	Foshan, China	1st	Individual kata
2010	38th Japan Cup Karatedo Championships		1st	Individual kata
2011	39th Japan Cup Karatedo Championships		1st	Individual kata
2012	40th Japan Cup Karatedo Championships	Japan	1st	Individual kata
2012	21st World Championships	Paris, France	1st	Individual kata

== Publications ==
- Usami, Rika. "Interview 2011 (今月の時の顔(第9回)宇佐美里香(空手道-女子形-金メダリスト) 追いつけない"師"を持つということ)", 総合教育技術. vol.65 no.14 (March 2011): pp. 3–6. ISSN 0911-0526, OCLC 5173379407.
- Japan best players-the medalist of the 21st WKF Paris. vol.2 "Kata." Tokyo : CHAMP. DVD video. OCLC 1126002786.
- Rika Usami's best karate (宇佐美里香のベスト空手 : 世界一の形とそれを創るベーシックス&マインド). Tokyo : CHAMP, DVD video. OCLC 1111859875.
- Usami, Rika. Karatedo yondai ryuha kihonkei : Divuidi de yoku wakaru ! (空手道四大流派基本形 : DVDでよくわかる!), Baseball Magazine Co., Ltd. ISBN 9784583106885, 4583106882, OCLC 881380997.
- "Usami Rika-san ni kiku ... : (Kokushikan-daigaku karatedo-bu sen'nin kochi, 2012-nen WKF senshuken (France) kojin kata yusho) (「フェアプレイで日本を元気に!」応援企画(15)宇佐美里香さん(国士舘大学空手道部専任コーチ、2012年世界空手道選手権大会〈フランス〉個人形優勝)に聞く...)", Coaching clinic, vol. 28 no.2 (February 2014) pp. 28–31. OCLC 8198964937.
- Usami, Rika; Waranabe, Yusuke (渡邊祐介). "Jibun no "iro" wo hassuru hito ni (自分の「色」を発する人に : 地道な繰り返しが一流の魅力をつくる)", Matsushita Kōnosuke Juku, vol.21, January 2015, pp. 26–29. OCLC 5724709675.
- Usami, Rika; 松久功; 千野ひとみ. 2016 zensho BS11 version, Final soshuhen. (2016全少BS11 ver. final 総集編 文部科学大臣旗第16回全日本少年少女空手道選手権大会より). Tokyo : CHAMP, Blu-ray disc. OCLC 1128248117.
- Usami, Rika. Rika Usami's gold seminar vol.1 (宇佐美里香のゴールドセミナー : 呼吸を止めず力まず楽に技を極める! : 世界一の基本とチャタンヤラクーサンクー), Tokyo : CHAMP, Blu-ray disc. 2018. OCLC 1078623702.
- Usami, Rika. (2019) Rika Usami's gold seminar vol.2 (宇佐美里香のゴールドセミナー : スピードとキレを生む世界一のテクニック! : スーパーリンペイ&トマリバッサイ. 2), Tokyo : CHAMP, Blu-ray disc. OCLC 1091037944.
