= Pegah Zangeneh =

Iranian karateka (born 1984)

Pegah Zangeneh Karkooti
- Born: 6 February 1984 (age 42); Kermanshah, Iran
- Style: Kumite
- Rank: Black belt, 5th dan

Other information
- Website: www.instagram.com/zangenehpegah

Pegah Zangeneh Karkooti (Persian: پگاه زنگنه کرکوتی; born February 6, 1984, in Kermanshah) is an Iranian karateka and coach. She began karate training at age eight with her first coach, Maryam Moshiri, at Milad Club in Kermanshah. She then continued karate training under the supervision of her brother, Babak Zangeneh. She won the 2018 Jakarta Asian Games Bronze medal. Currently, she is one of the Iranian karate national female team's coaches.

== See also ==
- Asian Games
- Asian Karate Championships
- Karate1 Premier League
