= Samaneh Khoshghadam =

Iranian karateka (born 1983)

- Born: 1 April 1983 (age 43); Tehran, Iran
- Height: 168 cm (5 ft 6 in)
- Weight: 60 kg (132 lb; 9 st 6 lb)
- Style: Kumite
- Rank: Black belt, 6th dan

Other information
- Website: karatenationalgirls.com

Samaneh Khoshghadam (Persian: سمانه خوشقدم; born on 1 April 1983 in Tehran) is an Iranian karateka. The champions like Hamideh Abbasali and Taravat Khaksar are her trainees. She began Karate at the age of 16. In 2003, she joined the Iran karate national women's team. She is now the head coach of the Iranian karate women's national team.

== Coaching background ==
=== Olympic Games ===
- Head coach of Iran's Karate national team in Premier League 2021 Lisbon and getting two quotas 2020 Summer Olympics Tokyo.
- At the 2020 Summer Olympics Tokyo, she was the head coach of the Iranian women's karate team. Her students Hamideh Abbasali, in +61 kg weight with two wins and two losses, could not get a medal and stood in 7th place. Also, Sara Bahmanyar in -55 kg weight with 1 win and 1 loss stood in 5th place.
- Head coach of Iran's Karate national team in 2018 Croatia Youth Premier league and getting 3 quota's Youth Olympic Games 2018 Buenos Aires.
- Head coach of Iran's Karate national team in 2018 Buenos Aires Youth Olympic Games, and getting 3 bronze medals by Negin Altooni, Fateme Khonakdar, Mobina Heydari

=== World Karate Championships ===
- Head coach of Iran's under-23 karate national team in 2017 Spain - World Karate Championships and winner of one gold and one silver individual medal and fifth place worldwide.

=== Islamic Solidarity Games ===
- Coach of Iran's adult karate national team in 2017 Islamic Solidarity Games and winner of one gold medal and two bronze medals.

=== International University Sports Federation|FISU ===
- Head coach of Iran's student karate national team in 2018 World University Karate Championships - Japan and winner of second place.
- coach of Iran's students karate national team in 2014 World University Karate Championships - Montenegro and ranked the first.

=== Asian Karate Championships ===
- Head coach of Iran's Cadet and Junior national teams in Asian Karate Championships - 2018 Okinawa and winner of the first place.
- Coach of Iran's under-23 and adult karate national team in 2017 Asian Karate Championships - Astana, Kazakhstan and winner of four gold, one silver and two bronze medal, and totally, earned Asia's second ranked.
- Head coach of Iran's under-23 national team in Asian karate championships Indonesia 2016 and winner of one gold, one silver, and two bronze, ranked second in Asia.
