= Amir Mehdizadeh =

Iranian karateka (born 1989)

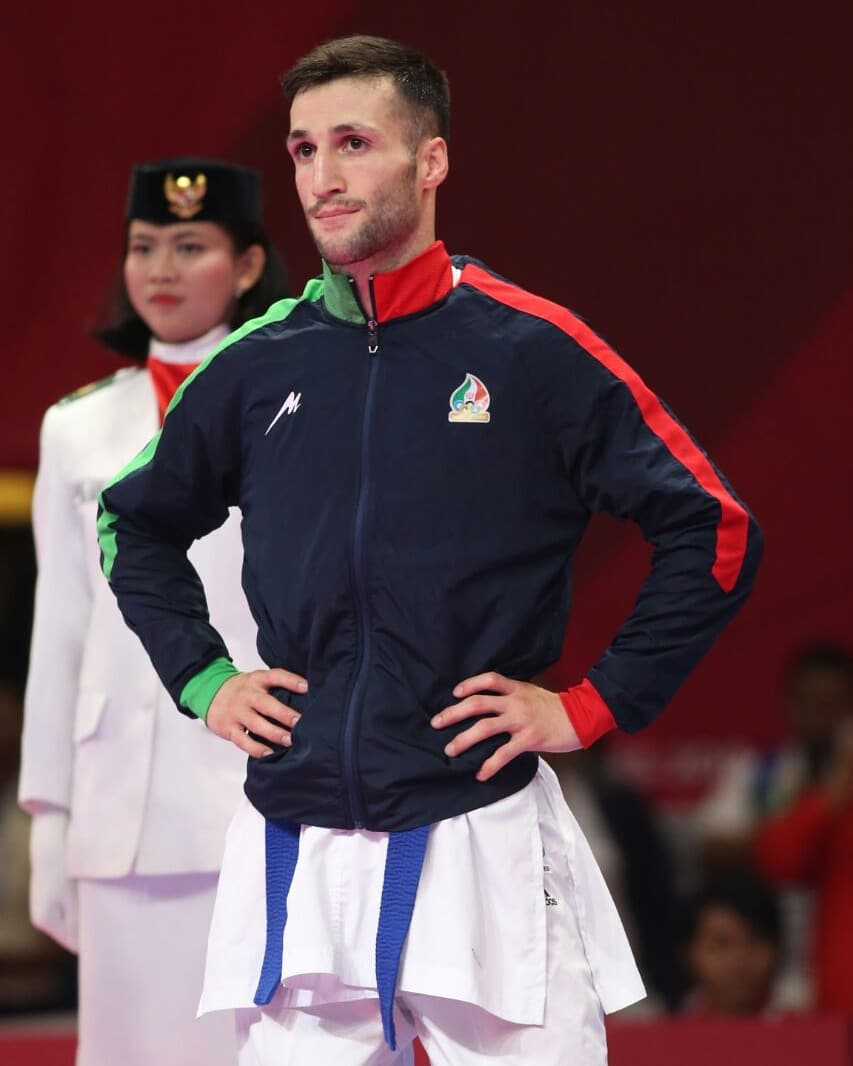
- Mehdizadeh in 2018
- Born: 22 September 1989 (age 37); Qom (Iran)
- Style: Kumite

Amir Mehdizadeh (Persian: امیر مهدی‌زاده, also Romanized as "Amīr Mehdīzādeh"; born 22 September 1989) is an Iranian karateka. Mehdizadeh competed at the 2014 Asian Games at the 60 kg division and won the gold medal. He also won the gold medal in 2012 and 2016 World Karate Championships.
