= Asian Karate Championships =

Karate competition

Asian Karatedo Championships
- Abbreviation: AKF Championships
- Location: Asia
- Region served: Asian Continental countries/regions
- Members: 40 Affiliated Countries
- Official language: English is the official language. If any question in respect to the sport or technique of karate, it will be referred to the original Japanese text.
- Website: http://asiankaratefederation.net

The Asian Karatedo Championships are the highest level of competition for sport karate in Asia. The competition is held in a different country every two years organized by the Asian Karatedo Federation (AKF) under the supervision of World Karate Federation (WKF), the largest international governing body of sport karate with over 180 member countries. It is the only karate organization recognised by the International Olympic Committee and has more than ten million members. The AKF organizes the Junior and Senior Asian Karatedo Championships in every two years in between the Olympic and Asian Games and participates in WKF World Karate Championships which its member Japan play as a powerhouse country when it comes to sport karate vying for world titles with counterpart opponents from the powerful nations such as France, United Kingdom, Netherlands, Spain and Italy in many world championships.

== Asian Senior Karate Championships ==
Year	Edition	Date	City and host country
1993	1	23–24 November	Taipei, Taiwan
1995	2	18–24 September	Manila, Philippines
1997	3	3–9 November	Macau
1999	4	1–2 December	Singapore
2001	5	2–4 November	Genting Highlands, Malaysia
2004	6	6–8 February	Taoyuan, Taiwan
2005	7	19–22 May	Macau
2007	8	24–26 August	Seremban, Malaysia
2009	9	25–27 September	Foshan, China
2011	10	21–24 July	Quanzhou, China
2012	11	14–17 July	Tashkent, Uzbekistan
2013	12	5–7 December	Dubai, United Arab Emirates
2015	13	4–6 September	Yokohama, Japan
2017	14	15–17 July	Astana, Kazakhstan
2018	15	13–15 July	Amman, Jordan
2019	16	19–21 July	Tashkent, Uzbekistan
2021	17	20–22 December	Almaty, Kazakhstan
2022	18	16–20 December	Tashkent, Uzbekistan
2023	19	18–23 July	Malacca, Malaysia
2024	20	20–22 September	Hangzhou, China
2025	21	23–25 May	Tashkent, Uzbekistan
2026	22	18–21 June	Bali, Indonesia

== Asian Cadet, Junior and U-21yrs Karate Championships ==
Year	Edition	Date	City and host country
1992	1 AUKO	September	Kuala Lumpur, Malaysia
1994	2 AUKO	September	Hanoi, Vietnam
1996	3 AUKO	September	Taichung, Taiwan
1998	4 AUKO	November	Macau
2000	5 AKF	August	Macau
2002	6 AKF	September	Tokyo, Japan
2005	7 AKF	November	Macau
2006	8 AKF	October	Singapore, Singapore
2008	9 AKF	September	Sabah, Malaysia
2010	10 AKF	August	Hong Kong, Hong Kong China
2011	11 AKF	July	Quanzhou, China
2012	12 AKF	July	Tashkent, Uzbekistan
2013	13 AKF	December	Dubai, United Arab Emirates
2015	14 AKF	August	Kuala Lumpur, Malaysia
2016	15 AKF	November	Makassar, Indonesia
2017	16 AKF	July	Astana, Kazakhstan
2018	17 AKF	May	Okinawa, Japan
2019	18 AKF	April	Kota Kinabalu, Sabah, Malaysia
2021	19 AKF	19–22 December	Almaty, Kazakhstan
2022	20 AKF	16–20 December	Tashkent, Uzbekistan
2023	21 AKF	6–8 November	Almaty, Kazakhstan
2024	22 AKF	23–25 August	Manila, Philippines
2025	23 AKF	05-07 September	Shaoguan China
2026	24 AKF	08-11 September	Amman, Jordan

== See also ==
- World Karate Championships
- Karate at the Asian Games
- World Cadet, Junior and U21 Karate Championships
