= List of Asian Games medalists in karate =

This is the complete list of Asian Games medalists in karate from 1994 to 2026.

== Men ==
=== Kata ===
Games	Gold	Silver	Bronze
1994 Hiroshima	Ryoki Abe (JPN)	Abdullah Kadir (INA)	Richard Lim (PHI)
1998 Bangkok	Ryoki Abe (JPN)	Alaeddin Nekoufar (IRI)	Abdullah Kadir (INA)
2002 Busan	Yukimitsu Hasegawa (JPN)	Wong Pak Cheong (MAC)	Ku Jin Keat (MAS)
2002 Busan	Yukimitsu Hasegawa (JPN)	Wong Pak Cheong (MAC)	Rayappan Jebamalai Edward (SRI)
2006 Doha	Tetsuya Furukawa (JPN)	Ku Jin Keat (MAS)	Noel Espinosa (PHI)
2006 Doha	Tetsuya Furukawa (JPN)	Ku Jin Keat (MAS)	Shen Chia-hao (TPE)
2010 Guangzhou	Ku Jin Keat (MAS)	Itaru Oki (JPN)	Faisal Zainuddin (INA)
2010 Guangzhou	Ku Jin Keat (MAS)	Itaru Oki (JPN)	Yousef Al-Harbi (IOC)
2014 Incheon	Lim Chee Wei (MAS)	Fidelys Lolobua (INA)	Issei Shimbaba (JPN)
2014 Incheon	Lim Chee Wei (MAS)	Fidelys Lolobua (INA)	Marwan Al-Maazmi (UAE)
2018 Jakarta–Palembang	Ryo Kiyuna (JPN)	Wang Yi-ta (TPE)	Ahmad Zigi Zaresta Yuda (INA)
2018 Jakarta–Palembang	Ryo Kiyuna (JPN)	Wang Yi-ta (TPE)	Park Hee-jun (KOR)
2022 Hangzhou	Kazumasa Moto (JPN)	Kuok Kin Hang (MAC)	Park Hee-jun (KOR)
2022 Hangzhou	Kazumasa Moto (JPN)	Kuok Kin Hang (MAC)	Salman Al-Mosawi (KUW)
2026 Aichi–Nagoya	Kakeru Nishiyama (JPN)	Fong Man Hou (MAC)	Howard Hung (HKG)
2026 Aichi–Nagoya	Kakeru Nishiyama (JPN)	Fong Man Hou (MAC)	Mohammad Al-Mosawi (KUW)

=== Team kata ===
Games	Gold	Silver	Bronze
2022 Hangzhou	Japan (JPN); Koji Arimoto; Kazumasa Moto; Ryuji Moto	Macau (MAC); Cheang Pei Lok; Fong Man Hou; Kuok Kin Hang	Iraq (IRQ); Pazhar Mahdi; Binar Mustafa; Yousif Salam
2022 Hangzhou	Japan (JPN); Koji Arimoto; Kazumasa Moto; Ryuji Moto	Macau (MAC); Cheang Pei Lok; Fong Man Hou; Kuok Kin Hang	Kuwait (KUW); Mohammad Al-Mosawi; Salman Al-Mosawi; Mohammad Bader
2026 Aichi–Nagoya	Kuwait (KUW); Mohammad Al-Mosawi; Salman Al-Mosawi; Mohammad Bader	Macau (MAC); Cheang Pei Lok; Fong Man Hou; Kuok Kin Hang	Hong Kong (HKG); Howard Hung; Li Chi Kong; Tang Yu Hin
2026 Aichi–Nagoya	Kuwait (KUW); Mohammad Al-Mosawi; Salman Al-Mosawi; Mohammad Bader	Macau (MAC); Cheang Pei Lok; Fong Man Hou; Kuok Kin Hang	Malaysia (MAS); Aiqal Asmadie; Haznil Henry; Mukhriz Mazlan

=== Kumite flyweight ===
- 55 kg: 1998–

Games	Gold	Silver	Bronze
1998 Bangkok	Muralitharan Chandra (MAS)	Bader Al-Otaibi (KUW)	Isfan Tanjung (INA)
1998 Bangkok	Muralitharan Chandra (MAS)	Bader Al-Otaibi (KUW)	Lê Tùng Dương (VIE)
2002 Busan	Puvaneswaran Ramasamy (MAS)	Otabek Kasimov (UZB)	Bambang Maulidin (INA)
2002 Busan	Puvaneswaran Ramasamy (MAS)	Otabek Kasimov (UZB)	Phạm Trần Nguyên (VIE)
2006 Doha	Hsieh Cheng-kang (TPE)	Puvaneswaran Ramasamy (MAS)	Thamer Al-Malki (KSA)
2006 Doha	Hsieh Cheng-kang (TPE)	Puvaneswaran Ramasamy (MAS)	Phạm Trần Nguyên (VIE)
2010 Guangzhou	Puvaneswaran Ramasamy (MAS)	Imad Al-Malki (KSA)	Hirannithishatphol Saratham (THA)
2010 Guangzhou	Puvaneswaran Ramasamy (MAS)	Imad Al-Malki (KSA)	Hsieh Cheng-kang (TPE)
2014 Incheon	Andrey Aktauov (KAZ)	Abdullah Al-Harbi (KSA)	Sun Jingchao (CHN)
2014 Incheon	Andrey Aktauov (KAZ)	Abdullah Al-Harbi (KSA)	Senthil Kumaran Silvarajoo (MAS)
2026 Aichi–Nagoya	Zholaman Bigabyl (KAZ)	Khumoyunmirzo Khalimov (UZB)	Thevendran Kaliana Sundram (MAS)
2026 Aichi–Nagoya	Zholaman Bigabyl (KAZ)	Khumoyunmirzo Khalimov (UZB)	Makhsatullo Muminov (TJK)

=== Kumite bantamweight ===
- 60 kg: 1994–

Games	Gold	Silver	Bronze
1994 Hiroshima	Shinichiro Yamamoto (JPN)	Trần Văn Thông (VIE)	Ng Iat On (MAC)
1994 Hiroshima	Shinichiro Yamamoto (JPN)	Trần Văn Thông (VIE)	Puvaneswaran Ramasamy (MAS)
1998 Bangkok	Arief Taufan Syamsuddin (INA)	None awarded	Sambar Bahadur Gole (NEP)
1998 Bangkok	Arief Taufan Syamsuddin (INA)	None awarded	Adnan Laoundi (SYR)
2002 Busan	Kenichi Imai (JPN)	Hossein Rouhani (IRI)	Hussain Al-Qattan (KUW)
2002 Busan	Kenichi Imai (JPN)	Hossein Rouhani (IRI)	Ilkhom Karimov (UZB)
2006 Doha	Hossein Rouhani (IRI)	Kunasilan Lakanathan (MAS)	Abdullah Dalloul (QAT)
2006 Doha	Hossein Rouhani (IRI)	Kunasilan Lakanathan (MAS)	Huang Hsiang-chen (TPE)
2010 Guangzhou	Darkhan Assadilov (KAZ)	Bashar Al-Najjar (JOR)	Donny Dharmawan (INA)
2010 Guangzhou	Darkhan Assadilov (KAZ)	Bashar Al-Najjar (JOR)	Trần Minh Đức (VIE)
2014 Incheon	Amir Mehdizadeh (IRI)	Abdelrahman Al-Masatfa (JOR)	Lee Ji-hwan (KOR)
2014 Incheon	Amir Mehdizadeh (IRI)	Abdelrahman Al-Masatfa (JOR)	Nguyễn Thanh Duy (VIE)
2018 Jakarta–Palembang	Rifki Ardiansyah Arrosyiid (INA)	Amir Mehdizadeh (IRI)	Prem Kumar Selvam (MAS)
2018 Jakarta–Palembang	Rifki Ardiansyah Arrosyiid (INA)	Amir Mehdizadeh (IRI)	Sadriddin Saymatov (UZB)
2022 Hangzhou	Kaisar Alpysbay (KAZ)	Abdullah Shaaban (KUW)	Abdallah Hammad (JOR)
2022 Hangzhou	Kaisar Alpysbay (KAZ)	Abdullah Shaaban (KUW)	Siwakon Muekthong (THA)
2026 Aichi–Nagoya	Abdullah Shaaban (KUW)	Abdelrahman Abdelhamid (QAT)	Saud Al-Basher (KSA)
2026 Aichi–Nagoya	Abdullah Shaaban (KUW)	Abdelrahman Abdelhamid (QAT)	Sureeya Sankar (MAS)

=== Kumite featherweight ===
- 65 kg: 1994–2006
- 67 kg: 2010–

Games	Gold	Silver	Bronze
1994 Hiroshima	Raafat Al-Karad (SYR)	Arash Javanshir (IRI)	Sharif Ismail (KSA)
1994 Hiroshima	Raafat Al-Karad (SYR)	Arash Javanshir (IRI)	David Lay (PHI)
1998 Bangkok	Norihide Narazaki (JPN)	Chen Teng-tien (TPE)	Eakarach Loongban (THA)
1998 Bangkok	Norihide Narazaki (JPN)	Chen Teng-tien (TPE)	Đỗ Tuấn Cương (VIE)
2002 Busan	Hasan Basri (INA)	Mehdi Amouzadeh (IRI)	Nayef Al-Matrouk (KUW)
2002 Busan	Hasan Basri (INA)	Mehdi Amouzadeh (IRI)	Shao Chih-kang (TPE)
2006 Doha	Hassan Rouhani (IRI)	Shion Kayahara (JPN)	Lim Yoke Wai (MAS)
2006 Doha	Hassan Rouhani (IRI)	Shion Kayahara (JPN)	Magid Adwan (QAT)
2010 Guangzhou	Rinat Sagandykov (KAZ)	Abdullah Al-Otaibi (IOC)	Lee Ji-hwan (KOR)
2010 Guangzhou	Rinat Sagandykov (KAZ)	Abdullah Al-Otaibi (IOC)	Fahad Al-Khathami (KSA)
2014 Incheon	Hiroto Shinohara (JPN)	Rinat Sagandykov (KAZ)	Kim Do-won (KOR)
2014 Incheon	Hiroto Shinohara (JPN)	Rinat Sagandykov (KAZ)	Ali Al-Shatti (KUW)
2018 Jakarta–Palembang	Ali Al-Shatti (KUW)	Didar Amirali (KAZ)	Jintar Simanjuntak (INA)
2018 Jakarta–Palembang	Ali Al-Shatti (KUW)	Didar Amirali (KAZ)	Abdelrahman Al-Masatfa (JOR)
2022 Hangzhou	Fahed Al-Ajmi (KUW)	Abdelrahman Al-Masatfa (JOR)	Didar Amirali (KAZ)
2022 Hangzhou	Fahed Al-Ajmi (KUW)	Abdelrahman Al-Masatfa (JOR)	Baýry Baýryýew (TKM)
2026 Aichi–Nagoya	Abdul Vakhkhob Rashidov (UZB)	Yugo Kozaki (JPN)	Abdelrahman Al-Masatfa (JOR)
2026 Aichi–Nagoya	Abdul Vakhkhob Rashidov (UZB)	Yugo Kozaki (JPN)	Shih Cheng-chung (TPE)

=== Kumite lightweight ===
- 70 kg: 1994–2006

Games	Gold	Silver	Bronze
1994 Hiroshima	Maziar Farid-Khomami (IRI)	Adel Al-Mejadi (KUW)	Kazuaki Matsumoto (JPN)
1994 Hiroshima	Maziar Farid-Khomami (IRI)	Adel Al-Mejadi (KUW)	Mohamed Salem Ghalaita (UAE)
1998 Bangkok	Muniandy Rajoo (MAS)	Mehdi Amouzadeh (IRI)	Shizuo Shiina (JPN)
1998 Bangkok	Muniandy Rajoo (MAS)	Mehdi Amouzadeh (IRI)	Raafat Al-Karad (SYR)
2002 Busan	Alireza Katiraei (IRI)	Shattyk Kazhymukanov (KAZ)	Magid Adwan (QAT)
2002 Busan	Alireza Katiraei (IRI)	Shattyk Kazhymukanov (KAZ)	Hsu Hsiang-ming (TPE)
2006 Doha	Abdullah Al-Otaibi (KUW)	Naowras Al-Hamwi (SYR)	Saeid Farrokhi (IRI)
2006 Doha	Abdullah Al-Otaibi (KUW)	Naowras Al-Hamwi (SYR)	Takuro Nihei (JPN)

=== Kumite welterweight ===
- 75 kg: 1994–

Games	Gold	Silver	Bronze
1994 Hiroshima	Shizuo Shiina (JPN)	Saeid Ashtian (IRI)	Ahmad Al-Khaledi (KUW)
1994 Hiroshima	Shizuo Shiina (JPN)	Saeid Ashtian (IRI)	Arivalagan Ponniah (MAS)
1998 Bangkok	Alireza Katiraei (IRI)	Takahiro Niki (JPN)	Ahmad Al-Khaledi (KUW)
1998 Bangkok	Alireza Katiraei (IRI)	Takahiro Niki (JPN)	Arivalagan Ponniah (MAS)
2002 Busan	Ahmad Muneer (KUW)	Jasem Vishkaei (IRI)	Tong Kit Siong (BRU)
2002 Busan	Ahmad Muneer (KUW)	Jasem Vishkaei (IRI)	Kim Byung-chul (KOR)
2006 Doha	Jasem Vishkaei (IRI)	Ko Matsuhisa (JPN)	Talat Khalil (JOR)
2006 Doha	Jasem Vishkaei (IRI)	Ko Matsuhisa (JPN)	Shattyk Kazhymukanov (KAZ)
2010 Guangzhou	Hamad Al-Nweam (IOC)	Huang Hao-yun (TPE)	Lee Ka Wai (HKG)
2010 Guangzhou	Hamad Al-Nweam (IOC)	Huang Hao-yun (TPE)	Kim Do-won (KOR)
2014 Incheon	Saeid Hassanipour (IRI)	Lee Ka Wai (HKG)	Songvut Muntaen (THA)
2014 Incheon	Saeid Hassanipour (IRI)	Lee Ka Wai (HKG)	Gofurjon Zokhidov (UZB)
2018 Jakarta–Palembang	Bahman Asgari (IRI)	Raef Al-Turkistani (KSA)	Bashar Al-Najjar (JOR)
2018 Jakarta–Palembang	Bahman Asgari (IRI)	Raef Al-Turkistani (KSA)	Hsu Wei-chun (TPE)
2022 Hangzhou	Nurkanat Azhikanov (KAZ)	Hasan Masarweh (JOR)	Ignatius Joshua Kandou (INA)
2022 Hangzhou	Nurkanat Azhikanov (KAZ)	Hasan Masarweh (JOR)	Nazim Nurlanov (KGZ)
2026 Aichi–Nagoya	Morteza Nemati (IRI)	Dawut Nazmyradow (TKM)	Nurkanat Azhikanov (KAZ)
2026 Aichi–Nagoya	Morteza Nemati (IRI)	Dawut Nazmyradow (TKM)	Fawaz Bani Al-Marjeh (SYR)

=== Kumite middleweight ===
- 80 kg: 1994–2006
- 84 kg: 2010–

Games	Gold	Silver	Bronze
1994 Hiroshima	Toshihito Kokubun (JPN)	Nour Shamseh (SYR)	Isroil Ismoilov (TJK)
1994 Hiroshima	Toshihito Kokubun (JPN)	Nour Shamseh (SYR)	Liao Yun-chih (TPE)
2006 Doha	Ahmad Muneer (KUW)	Ryosuke Shimizu (JPN)	Esmaeil Torkzad (IRI)
2006 Doha	Ahmad Muneer (KUW)	Ryosuke Shimizu (JPN)	Mutasembellah Khair (JOR)
2010 Guangzhou	Jasem Vishkaei (IRI)	Ryutaro Araga (JPN)	Mutasembellah Khair (JOR)
2010 Guangzhou	Jasem Vishkaei (IRI)	Ryutaro Araga (JPN)	Yen Tzu-yao (TPE)
2014 Incheon	Ryutaro Araga (JPN)	Hamad Al-Nweam (KUW)	Jang Min-soo (KOR)
2014 Incheon	Ryutaro Araga (JPN)	Hamad Al-Nweam (KUW)	Shakhboz Akhatov (UZB)
2018 Jakarta–Palembang	Ryutaro Araga (JPN)	Ahmad Al-Mesfer (KUW)	Zabihollah Pourshab (IRI)
2018 Jakarta–Palembang	Ryutaro Araga (JPN)	Ahmad Al-Mesfer (KUW)	Wu Chun-wei (TPE)
2022 Hangzhou	Arif Afifuddin (MAS)	Daniyar Yuldashev (KAZ)	Mohammad Al-Jafari (JOR)
2022 Hangzhou	Arif Afifuddin (MAS)	Daniyar Yuldashev (KAZ)	Đỗ Thành Nhân (VIE)
2026 Aichi–Nagoya	Mohammad Al-Jafari (JOR)	Ali Asghar Asiabari (IRI)	Abdulla Babikr (QAT)
2026 Aichi–Nagoya	Mohammad Al-Jafari (JOR)	Ali Asghar Asiabari (IRI)	Chung Meng-yu (TPE)

=== Kumite heavyweight ===
- +80 kg: 1994
- +75 kg: 1998–2002
- +80 kg: 2006
- +84 kg: 2010–

Games	Gold	Silver	Bronze
1994 Hiroshima	Yasumasa Shimizu (JPN)	Abdulmuttalib Al-Bargawi (KSA)	Vahid Khajeh-Hosseini (IRI)
1994 Hiroshima	Yasumasa Shimizu (JPN)	Abdulmuttalib Al-Bargawi (KSA)	Fairuz Mohd Fajeer (MAS)
1998 Bangkok	Jaber Al-Hammad (KUW)	Ali Shaterzadeh (IRI)	Suresh Rao Subramaniam (MAS)
1998 Bangkok	Jaber Al-Hammad (KUW)	Ali Shaterzadeh (IRI)	Chu Tien-lai (TPE)
2002 Busan	Mehran Behnamfar (IRI)	Andrey Korolev (KAZ)	Jaber Al-Hammad (KUW)
2002 Busan	Mehran Behnamfar (IRI)	Andrey Korolev (KAZ)	Isroil Ismoilov (TJK)
2006 Doha	Khalid Khalidov (KAZ)	Jaber Al-Hammad (KUW)	Umar Syarief (INA)
2006 Doha	Khalid Khalidov (KAZ)	Jaber Al-Hammad (KUW)	Amer Abu Afifeh (JOR)
2010 Guangzhou	Zabihollah Pourshab (IRI)	Umar Syarief (INA)	Khalid Khalidov (KAZ)
2010 Guangzhou	Zabihollah Pourshab (IRI)	Umar Syarief (INA)	Lei Kuong Cheong (MAC)
2014 Incheon	Rashed Al-Mutairi (KUW)	Hideyoshi Kagawa (JPN)	Khalid Khalidov (KAZ)
2014 Incheon	Rashed Al-Mutairi (KUW)	Hideyoshi Kagawa (JPN)	Sengpheng Duangvilai (LAO)
2018 Jakarta–Palembang	Sajjad Ganjzadeh (IRI)	Nguyễn Minh Phụng (VIE)	Daniyar Yuldashev (KAZ)
2018 Jakarta–Palembang	Sajjad Ganjzadeh (IRI)	Nguyễn Minh Phụng (VIE)	Tareg Hamedi (KSA)
2022 Hangzhou	Sajjad Ganjzadeh (IRI)	Adilet Shadykanov (KGZ)	Tareg Hamedi (KSA)
2022 Hangzhou	Sajjad Ganjzadeh (IRI)	Adilet Shadykanov (KGZ)	Teerawat Kangtong (THA)
2026 Aichi–Nagoya	Mahmoud Nemati (IRI)	Sanad Sufyani (KSA)	Tenzing Sherpa (NEP)
2026 Aichi–Nagoya	Mahmoud Nemati (IRI)	Sanad Sufyani (KSA)	Teerawat Kangtong (THA)

== Women ==
=== Kata ===
Games	Gold	Silver	Bronze
1994 Hiroshima	Hisami Yokoyama (JPN)	Omita Olga Ompi (INA)	Chen Shu-chen (TPE)
1998 Bangkok	Atsuko Wakai (JPN)	Omita Olga Ompi (INA)	Lim Lee Lee (MAS)
2002 Busan	Atsuko Wakai (JPN)	Lim Lee Lee (MAS)	Cheung Pui Si (MAC)
2002 Busan	Atsuko Wakai (JPN)	Lim Lee Lee (MAS)	Cherli Tugday (PHI)
2006 Doha	Nao Morooka (JPN)	Nguyễn Hoàng Ngân (VIE)	Cheung Pui Si (MAC)
2006 Doha	Nao Morooka (JPN)	Nguyễn Hoàng Ngân (VIE)	Lim Lee Lee (MAS)
2010 Guangzhou	Rika Usami (JPN)	Huang Yu-chi (TPE)	Cheung Pui Si (MAC)
2010 Guangzhou	Rika Usami (JPN)	Huang Yu-chi (TPE)	Lim Lee Lee (MAS)
2014 Incheon	Kiyou Shimizu (JPN)	Nguyễn Hoàng Ngân (VIE)	Cheung Pui Si (MAC)
2014 Incheon	Kiyou Shimizu (JPN)	Nguyễn Hoàng Ngân (VIE)	Bimala Tamang (NEP)
2018 Jakarta–Palembang	Kiyou Shimizu (JPN)	Sou Soi Lam (MAC)	Grace Lau (HKG)
2018 Jakarta–Palembang	Kiyou Shimizu (JPN)	Sou Soi Lam (MAC)	Monsicha Tararattanakul (THA)
2022 Hangzhou	Kiyou Shimizu (JPN)	Lovelly Anne Robberth (MAS)	Grace Lau (HKG)
2022 Hangzhou	Kiyou Shimizu (JPN)	Lovelly Anne Robberth (MAS)	Sakura Alforte (PHI)
2026 Aichi–Nagoya	Maho Ono (JPN)	Grace Lau (HKG)	Chien Hui-hsuan (TPE)
2026 Aichi–Nagoya	Maho Ono (JPN)	Grace Lau (HKG)	Bùi Ngọc Nhi (VIE)

=== Team kata ===
Games	Gold	Silver	Bronze
2022 Hangzhou	Vietnam (VIE); Lưu Thị Thu Uyên; Nguyễn Ngọc Trâm; Nguyễn Thị Phương	Malaysia (MAS); Naccy Nelly Evvaferra; Lovelly Anne Robberth; Niathalia Sherawinnie	Brunei (BRU); Rodhyatul Adhwanna; Farhana Najeeha; Farhah Syahirah
2022 Hangzhou	Vietnam (VIE); Lưu Thị Thu Uyên; Nguyễn Ngọc Trâm; Nguyễn Thị Phương	Malaysia (MAS); Naccy Nelly Evvaferra; Lovelly Anne Robberth; Niathalia Sherawinnie	Cambodia (CAM); Oun Sreyda; Puthea Sreynuch; That Chhenghorng
2026 Aichi–Nagoya	Vietnam (VIE); Bùi Ngọc Nhi; Hoàng Thị Thu Uyên; Nguyễn Ngọc Trâm	Iran (IRI); Sepideh Amini; Zeinab Hosseini; Fatemeh Sadeghi	Philippines (PHI); Ysabielle Arrogante; Rebecca Torres; Samantha Veguillas
2026 Aichi–Nagoya	Vietnam (VIE); Bùi Ngọc Nhi; Hoàng Thị Thu Uyên; Nguyễn Ngọc Trâm	Iran (IRI); Sepideh Amini; Zeinab Hosseini; Fatemeh Sadeghi	Chinese Taipei (TPE); Chien Hui-hsuan; Hung Chih-hsuan; Tien Hsin-erh

=== Kumite flyweight ===
- 48 kg: 2006
- 50 kg: 2010–

Games	Gold	Silver	Bronze
2006 Doha	Vũ Thị Nguyệt Ánh (VIE)	Vasantha Marial Anthony (MAS)	Jittikan Tiemsurakan (THA)
2006 Doha	Vũ Thị Nguyệt Ánh (VIE)	Vasantha Marial Anthony (MAS)	Chen Yen-hui (TPE)
2010 Guangzhou	Li Hong (CHN)	Vũ Thị Nguyệt Ánh (VIE)	Yanisa Torrattanawathana (THA)
2010 Guangzhou	Li Hong (CHN)	Vũ Thị Nguyệt Ánh (VIE)	Chen Yen-hui (TPE)
2014 Incheon	Ku Tsui-ping (TPE)	Yekaterina Khupovets (KAZ)	Nasrin Dousti (IRI)
2014 Incheon	Ku Tsui-ping (TPE)	Yekaterina Khupovets (KAZ)	Jang So-young (KOR)
2018 Jakarta–Palembang	Gu Shiau-shuang (TPE)	Bakhriniso Babaeva (UZB)	Miho Miyahara (JPN)
2018 Jakarta–Palembang	Gu Shiau-shuang (TPE)	Bakhriniso Babaeva (UZB)	Junna Tsukii (PHI)
2022 Hangzhou	Gu Shiau-shuang (TPE)	Moldir Zhangbyrbay (KAZ)	Sara Bahmanyar (IRI)
2022 Hangzhou	Gu Shiau-shuang (TPE)	Moldir Zhangbyrbay (KAZ)	Hawraa Al-Ajmi (UAE)
2026 Aichi–Nagoya	Shahmalarani Chandran (MAS)	Tsang Yee Ting (HKG)	Fong Man Wai (MAC)
2026 Aichi–Nagoya	Shahmalarani Chandran (MAS)	Tsang Yee Ting (HKG)	Marie June Adriano (PHI)

=== Kumite bantamweight ===
- 53 kg: 1994–2006
- 55 kg: 2010–

Games	Gold	Silver	Bronze
1994 Hiroshima	Hiromi Hasama (JPN)	Phạm Hồng Hà (VIE)	Nurosi Nurasjati (INA)
1994 Hiroshima	Hiromi Hasama (JPN)	Phạm Hồng Hà (VIE)	Liu Ya-chen (TPE)
1998 Bangkok	Eri Fujioka (JPN)	Sandra Aryani (INA)	Chang Chin-chih (TPE)
1998 Bangkok	Eri Fujioka (JPN)	Sandra Aryani (INA)	Phạm Hồng Hà (VIE)
2002 Busan	Vũ Kim Anh (VIE)	Eri Fujioka (JPN)	Murugaiyan Srirajarajeswari (MAS)
2002 Busan	Vũ Kim Anh (VIE)	Eri Fujioka (JPN)	Hsieh Ai-chen (TPE)
2006 Doha	Tomoko Araga (JPN)	Marna Pabillore (PHI)	Jenny Zeannet (INA)
2006 Doha	Tomoko Araga (JPN)	Marna Pabillore (PHI)	Venera Zhetibay (KAZ)
2010 Guangzhou	Lê Bích Phương (VIE)	Miki Kobayashi (JPN)	Fatemeh Chalaki (IRI)
2010 Guangzhou	Lê Bích Phương (VIE)	Miki Kobayashi (JPN)	Ahn Tae-eun (KOR)
2014 Incheon	Wen Tzu-yun (TPE)	Sabina Zakharova (KAZ)	Miki Kobayashi (JPN)
2014 Incheon	Wen Tzu-yun (TPE)	Sabina Zakharova (KAZ)	Mae Soriano (PHI)
2018 Jakarta–Palembang	Wen Tzu-yun (TPE)	Taravat Khaksar (IRI)	Cok Istri Agung Sanistyarani (INA)
2018 Jakarta–Palembang	Wen Tzu-yun (TPE)	Taravat Khaksar (IRI)	Wong Sok I (MAC)
2022 Hangzhou	Sevinch Rakhimova (UZB)	Ku Tsui-ping (TPE)	Ding Jiamei (CHN)
2022 Hangzhou	Sevinch Rakhimova (UZB)	Ku Tsui-ping (TPE)	Fatemeh Saadati (IRI)
2026 Aichi–Nagoya	Adeola Fay Robert (MAS)	Fatemeh Zahra Saeidabadi (IRI)	Cok Istri Agung Sanistyarani (INA)
2026 Aichi–Nagoya	Adeola Fay Robert (MAS)	Fatemeh Zahra Saeidabadi (IRI)	Bella Samasheva (KAZ)

=== Kumite lightweight ===
- 60 kg: 1994–2006
- 61 kg: 2010–

Games	Gold	Silver	Bronze
1994 Hiroshima	Hisako Yoshimi (JPN)	Su Su-chen (TPE)	Marliza Pg Omar (BRU)
1994 Hiroshima	Hisako Yoshimi (JPN)	Su Su-chen (TPE)	Nilawati Daud (INA)
1998 Bangkok	Li Wan-yu (TPE)	Phạm Hồng Thắm (VIE)	Nilawati Daud (INA)
1998 Bangkok	Li Wan-yu (TPE)	Phạm Hồng Thắm (VIE)	Phetlada Ausabay (THA)
2002 Busan	Premila Supramaniam (MAS)	Chan Ka Man (HKG)	Kwan Man Fei (MAC)
2002 Busan	Premila Supramaniam (MAS)	Chan Ka Man (HKG)	Gretchen Malalad (PHI)
2006 Doha	Yuka Sato (JPN)	Nguyễn Thị Hải Yến (VIE)	Chan Ka Man (HKG)
2006 Doha	Yuka Sato (JPN)	Nguyễn Thị Hải Yến (VIE)	Yamini Gopalasamy (MAS)
2010 Guangzhou	Yu Miyamoto (JPN)	Yamini Gopalasamy (MAS)	Chan Ka Man (HKG)
2010 Guangzhou	Yu Miyamoto (JPN)	Yamini Gopalasamy (MAS)	Barno Mirzaeva (UZB)
2014 Incheon	Syakilla Salni (MAS)	Barno Mirzaeva (UZB)	Yin Xiaoyan (CHN)
2014 Incheon	Syakilla Salni (MAS)	Barno Mirzaeva (UZB)	Fatemeh Chalaki (IRI)
2018 Jakarta–Palembang	Yin Xiaoyan (CHN)	Rozita Alipour (IRI)	Choi Wan Yu (HKG)
2018 Jakarta–Palembang	Yin Xiaoyan (CHN)	Rozita Alipour (IRI)	Barno Mirzaeva (UZB)
2022 Hangzhou	Gong Li (CHN)	Nguyễn Thị Ngoan (VIE)	Assel Kanay (KAZ)
2022 Hangzhou	Gong Li (CHN)	Nguyễn Thị Ngoan (VIE)	Kymbat Toitonova (KGZ)
2026 Aichi–Nagoya	Gong Li (CHN)	Assel Kanay (KAZ)	Vann Chakriya (CAM)
2026 Aichi–Nagoya	Gong Li (CHN)	Assel Kanay (KAZ)	Sarara Shimada (JPN)

=== Kumite middleweight ===
- 68 kg: 2010–

Games	Gold	Silver	Bronze
2010 Guangzhou	Feng Lanlan (CHN)	Emiko Honma (JPN)	Samira Malekipour (IRI)
2010 Guangzhou	Feng Lanlan (CHN)	Emiko Honma (JPN)	Liu Ya-li (TPE)
2014 Incheon	Guzaliya Gafurova (KAZ)	Tang Lingling (CHN)	Shree Sharmini Segaran (MAS)
2014 Incheon	Guzaliya Gafurova (KAZ)	Tang Lingling (CHN)	Chao Jou (TPE)
2018 Jakarta–Palembang	Guzaliya Gafurova (KAZ)	Tang Lingling (CHN)	Pegah Zangeneh (IRI)
2018 Jakarta–Palembang	Guzaliya Gafurova (KAZ)	Tang Lingling (CHN)	Kayo Someya (JPN)
2022 Hangzhou	Li Qiaoqiao (CHN)	Laura Alikul (KAZ)	Hala Al-Qadi (PLE)
2022 Hangzhou	Li Qiaoqiao (CHN)	Laura Alikul (KAZ)	Đinh Thị Hương (VIE)
2026 Aichi–Nagoya	Li Qiaoqiao (CHN)	Joud Al-Drous (JOR)	Wong Cheuk Lee (HKG)
2026 Aichi–Nagoya	Li Qiaoqiao (CHN)	Joud Al-Drous (JOR)	Nguyễn Thị Diệu Ly (VIE)

=== Kumite heavyweight ===
- +60 kg: 1994–2006
- +68 kg: 2010–

Games	Gold	Silver	Bronze
1994 Hiroshima	Hiromi Hirose (JPN)	Meity Johana Kaseger (INA)	Meghan Loo (BRU)
1994 Hiroshima	Hiromi Hirose (JPN)	Meity Johana Kaseger (INA)	Sita Kumari Rai (NEP)
1998 Bangkok	Izumi Nabeki (JPN)	Panadda Tamchuchaichana (THA)	Premila Supramaniam (MAS)
1998 Bangkok	Izumi Nabeki (JPN)	Panadda Tamchuchaichana (THA)	Hà Thị Kiều Trang (VIE)
2002 Busan	Nguyễn Trọng Bảo Ngọc (VIE)	Sofiya Kaspulatova (UZB)	Emiko Honma (JPN)
2002 Busan	Nguyễn Trọng Bảo Ngọc (VIE)	Sofiya Kaspulatova (UZB)	Natalya Solodilova (KAZ)
2006 Doha	Sofiya Kaspulatova (UZB)	Maitha Al-Maktoum (UAE)	Mardiah Nasution (INA)
2006 Doha	Sofiya Kaspulatova (UZB)	Maitha Al-Maktoum (UAE)	Paula Carion (MAC)
2010 Guangzhou	Manar Shath (JOR)	Jamaliah Jamaludin (MAS)	Tang Lingling (CHN)
2010 Guangzhou	Manar Shath (JOR)	Jamaliah Jamaludin (MAS)	Paula Carion (MAC)
2014 Incheon	Hamideh Abbasali (IRI)	Zeng Cuilan (CHN)	Ayumi Uekusa (JPN)
2014 Incheon	Hamideh Abbasali (IRI)	Zeng Cuilan (CHN)	Paula Carion (MAC)
2018 Jakarta–Palembang	Ayumi Uekusa (JPN)	Gao Mengmeng (CHN)	Hamideh Abbasali (IRI)
2018 Jakarta–Palembang	Ayumi Uekusa (JPN)	Gao Mengmeng (CHN)	Nargis Hameedullah (PAK)
2022 Hangzhou	Sofya Berultseva (KAZ)	Arika Gurung (NEP)	Joud Al-Drous (JOR)
2022 Hangzhou	Sofya Berultseva (KAZ)	Arika Gurung (NEP)	Yuzuki Sawae (JPN)
2026 Aichi–Nagoya	Sofya Berultseva (KAZ)	Maneewan Butsuwan (THA)	Leica Al Humaira Lubis (INA)
2026 Aichi–Nagoya	Sofya Berultseva (KAZ)	Maneewan Butsuwan (THA)	Dina Mustafa (KSA)
