= Karate at the 2002 Asian Games =

Karate competition

- Venue: Yangsan College Gymnasium
- Dates: 11–12 October 2002
- Competitors: 117 from 30 nations

Karate was competed by men and women at the 2002 Asian Games in Busan, South Korea. Kata was contested along with kumite. There were 11 gold medals contested for this sport. All competition took place at the Yangsan College Gymnasium on October 11 and 12. Each country was limited to having 5 athletes.

== Schedule ==
P	Preliminary rounds & Repechage	F	Finals

Event↓/Date →	11th Fri		12th Sat	
Men's kata	P	F		
Men's kumite 55 kg			P	F
Men's kumite 60 kg			P	F
Men's kumite 65 kg			P	F
Men's kumite 70 kg			P	F
Men's kumite 75 kg	P	F		
Men's kumite +75 kg	P	F		
Women's kata	P	F		
Women's kumite 53 kg	P	F		
Women's kumite 60 kg	P	F		
Women's kumite +60 kg	P	F		

== Medalists ==
=== Men ===
Event	Gold	Silver	Bronze
Kata	Yukimitsu Hasegawa; Japan	Wong Pak Cheong; Macau	Rayappan Jebamalai Edward; Sri Lanka
Kata	Yukimitsu Hasegawa; Japan	Wong Pak Cheong; Macau	Ku Jin Keat; Malaysia
Kumite −55 kg	Puvaneswaran Ramasamy; Malaysia	Otabek Kasimov; Uzbekistan	Bambang Maulidin; Indonesia
Kumite −55 kg	Puvaneswaran Ramasamy; Malaysia	Otabek Kasimov; Uzbekistan	Phạm Trần Nguyên; Vietnam
Kumite −60 kg	Kenichi Imai; Japan	Hossein Rouhani; Iran	Ilkhom Karimov; Uzbekistan
Kumite −60 kg	Kenichi Imai; Japan	Hossein Rouhani; Iran	Hussain Al-Qattan; Kuwait
Kumite −65 kg	Hasan Basri; Indonesia	Mehdi Amouzadeh; Iran	Shao Chih-kang; Chinese Taipei
Kumite −65 kg	Hasan Basri; Indonesia	Mehdi Amouzadeh; Iran	Nayef Al-Matrouk; Kuwait
Kumite −70 kg	Alireza Katiraei; Iran	Shattyk Kazhymukanov; Kazakhstan	Hsu Hsiang-ming; Chinese Taipei
Kumite −70 kg	Alireza Katiraei; Iran	Shattyk Kazhymukanov; Kazakhstan	Magid Adwan; Qatar
Kumite −75 kg	Ahmad Muneer; Kuwait	Jasem Vishkaei; Iran	Tong Kit Siong; Brunei
Kumite −75 kg	Ahmad Muneer; Kuwait	Jasem Vishkaei; Iran	Kim Byung-chul; South Korea
Kumite +75 kg	Mehran Behnamfar; Iran	Andrey Korolev; Kazakhstan	Jaber Al-Hammad; Kuwait
Kumite +75 kg	Mehran Behnamfar; Iran	Andrey Korolev; Kazakhstan	Isroil Ismoilov; Tajikistan

=== Women ===
Event	Gold	Silver	Bronze
Kata	Atsuko Wakai; Japan	Lim Lee Lee; Malaysia	Cheung Pui Si; Macau
Kata	Atsuko Wakai; Japan	Lim Lee Lee; Malaysia	Cherli Tugday; Philippines
Kumite −53 kg	Vũ Kim Anh; Vietnam	Eri Fujioka; Japan	Murugaiyan Srirajarajeswari; Malaysia
Kumite −53 kg	Vũ Kim Anh; Vietnam	Eri Fujioka; Japan	Hsieh Ai-chen; Chinese Taipei
Kumite −60 kg	Premila Supramaniam; Malaysia	Chan Ka Man; Hong Kong	Kwan Man Fei; Macau
Kumite −60 kg	Premila Supramaniam; Malaysia	Chan Ka Man; Hong Kong	Gretchen Malalad; Philippines
Kumite +60 kg	Nguyễn Trọng Bảo Ngọc; Vietnam	Sofiya Kaspulatova; Uzbekistan	Natalya Solodilova; Kazakhstan
Kumite +60 kg	Nguyễn Trọng Bảo Ngọc; Vietnam	Sofiya Kaspulatova; Uzbekistan	Emiko Honma; Japan

== Medal table ==
Rank	Nation	Gold	Silver	Bronze	Total
1	Japan (JPN)	3	1	1	5
2	Iran (IRI)	2	3	0	5
3	Malaysia (MAS)	2	1	2	5
4	Vietnam (VIE)	2	0	1	3
5	Kuwait (KUW)	1	0	3	4
6	Indonesia (INA)	1	0	1	2
7	Kazakhstan (KAZ)	0	2	1	3
7	Uzbekistan (UZB)	0	2	1	3
9	Macau (MAC)	0	1	2	3
10	Hong Kong (HKG)	0	1	0	1
11	Chinese Taipei (TPE)	0	0	3	3
12	Philippines (PHI)	0	0	2	2
13	Brunei (BRU)	0	0	1	1
13	Qatar (QAT)	0	0	1	1
13	South Korea (KOR)	0	0	1	1
13	Sri Lanka (SRI)	0	0	1	1
13	Tajikistan (TJK)	0	0	1	1
Totals (17 entries)		11	11	22	44

== Participating nations ==
A total of 117 athletes from 30 nations competed in karate at the 2002 Asian Games:

- Afghanistan (1)
- Brunei (5)
- Chinese Taipei (5)
- Hong Kong (4)
- India (2)
- Indonesia (5)
- Iran (5)
- Japan (5)
- Jordan (2)
- Kazakhstan (5)
- Kuwait (5)
- Laos (1)
- Macau (5)
- Malaysia (5)
- Nepal (5)
- North Korea (5)
- Pakistan (2)
- Palestine (3)
- Philippines (5)
- Qatar (5)
- South Korea (5)
- Sri Lanka (4)
- Syria (2)
- Tajikistan (5)
- Thailand (2)
- Timor-Leste (2)
- United Arab Emirates (5)
- Uzbekistan (5)
- Vietnam (5)
- Yemen (2)
