= Karate at the Asian Games =

Karate competition

- Governing bodies: WKF (World) / AKF (Asia)
- Events: 15 (men: 8; women: 7)

Games
- 1951; 1954; 1958; 1962; 1966; 1970; 1974; 1978; 1982; 1986; 1990; 1994; 1998; 2002; 2006; 2010; 2014; 2018; 2022; 2026
- Medalists

Karate is an Asian Games event first held at the 1994 in Hiroshima, Japan.

== Editions ==
Games	Year	Host city	Best nation
XII	1994	Hiroshima, Japan	Japan
XIII	1998	Bangkok, Thailand	Japan
XIV	2002	Busan, South Korea	Japan
XV	2006	Doha, Qatar	Japan
XVI	2010	Guangzhou, China	Japan
XVII	2014	Incheon, South Korea	Japan
XVII	2018	Jakarta–Palembang, Indonesia	Japan
XIX	2022	Hangzhou, China	Kazakhstan
XX	2026	Aichi–Nagoya, Japan	Iran

== Events ==
Event	94	98	02	06	10	14	18	22	26	Years
Men's kata	X	X	X	X	X	X	X	X	X	9
Men's team kata								X	X	2
Men's kumite 55 kg		X	X	X	X	X			X	6
Men's kumite 60 kg	X	X	X	X	X	X	X	X	X	9
Men's kumite 65 kg	X	X	X	X						4
Men's kumite 67 kg					X	X	X	X	X	5
Men's kumite 70 kg	X	X	X	X						4
Men's kumite 75 kg	X	X	X	X	X	X	X	X	X	9
Men's kumite 80 kg	X			X						2
Men's kumite 84 kg					X	X	X	X	X	5
Men's kumite +84 kg	X	X	X	X	X	X	X	X	X	9
Women's kata	X	X	X	X	X	X	X	X	X	9
Women's team kata								X	X	2
Women's kumite 48 kg				X						1
Women's kumite 50 kg					X	X	X	X	X	5
Women's kumite 53 kg	X	X	X	X						4
Women's kumite 55 kg					X	X	X	X	X	5
Women's kumite 60 kg	X	X	X	X						4
Women's kumite 61 kg					X	X	X	X	X	5
Women's kumite 68 kg					X	X	X	X	X	5
Women's kumite +68 kg	X	X	X	X	X	X	X	X	X	9
Total	11	11	11	13	13	13	12	14	15	

== Medal table ==
Rank	Nation	Gold	Silver	Bronze	Total
1	Japan (JPN)	35	11	11	57
2	Iran (IRI)	17	14	12	43
3	Kazakhstan (KAZ)	11	10	10	31
4	Malaysia (MAS)	11	9	19	39
5	Kuwait (KUW)	10	7	10	27
6	Chinese Taipei (TPE)	7	6	22	35
7	China (CHN)	7	4	4	15
8	Vietnam (VIE)	6	9	12	27
9	Indonesia (INA)	3	7	17	27
10	Uzbekistan (UZB)	3	5	6	14
11	Jordan (JOR)	2	5	10	17
12	Syria (SYR)	1	2	3	6
13	Macau (MAC)	0	6	12	18
14	Saudi Arabia (KSA)	0	5	7	12
15	Hong Kong (HKG)	0	4	9	13
16	Thailand (THA)	0	2	10	12
17	Philippines (PHI)	0	1	10	11
18	Nepal (NEP)	0	1	4	5
18	Qatar (QAT)	0	1	4	5
20	United Arab Emirates (UAE)	0	1	3	4
21	Kyrgyzstan (KGZ)	0	1	2	3
22	Turkmenistan (TKM)	0	1	1	2
23	South Korea (KOR)	0	0	10	10
24	Brunei (BRU)	0	0	4	4
25	Tajikistan (TJK)	0	0	3	3
26	Cambodia (CAM)	0	0	2	2
27	Iraq (IRQ)	0	0	1	1
27	Laos (LAO)	0	0	1	1
27	Pakistan (PAK)	0	0	1	1
27	Palestine (PLE)	0	0	1	1
27	Sri Lanka (SRI)	0	0	1	1
Totals (31 entries)		113	112	222	447
