= 2001 Asian Karate Championships =

Karate competition

- Host city: Genting Highlands, Malaysia
- Dates: 2–4 November 2001

The 2001 Asian Karate Championships are the fifth edition of the Asian Karate Championships, and were held in Genting Highlands, Malaysia from 2 to 4 November 2001.

== Medalists ==
=== Men ===
Event	Gold	Silver	Bronze
Individual kata	Hideto Tsuchiya; Japan	Wang Tsu-hsiang; Chinese Taipei	Ku Jin Keat; Malaysia
Individual kata	Hideto Tsuchiya; Japan	Wang Tsu-hsiang; Chinese Taipei	Wong Pan Pan; Hong Kong
Team kata	Malaysia; Ku Jin Keat; Yeoh Swee King; James Ch'ng	Japan; Shinichi Hasegawa; Katsuhide Hasegawa; Yukimitsu Hasegawa	Iran; Ebad Feizi; Majid Ashjaei; Amin Mazareei
Team kata	Malaysia; Ku Jin Keat; Yeoh Swee King; James Ch'ng	Japan; Shinichi Hasegawa; Katsuhide Hasegawa; Yukimitsu Hasegawa	Kuwait; Alaa Al-Hawaj; Mustafa Al-Shatti; Haytham Al-Qattan
Kumite −55 kg	Puvaneswaran Ramasamy; Malaysia	Bambang Maulidin; Indonesia	Bader Al-Otaibi; Kuwait
Kumite −55 kg	Puvaneswaran Ramasamy; Malaysia	Bambang Maulidin; Indonesia	Hj Eddie Jofriani Hj Johari; Brunei
Kumite −60 kg	Kenichi Imai; Japan	Bakhtiyar Tokseitov; Kazakhstan	Tsai Sang-yang; Chinese Taipei
Kumite −60 kg	Kenichi Imai; Japan	Bakhtiyar Tokseitov; Kazakhstan	Vladimir Korzh; Uzbekistan
Kumite −65 kg	Tsunaki Fujimura; Japan	Lim Yoke Wai; Malaysia	Hasan Basri; Indonesia
Kumite −65 kg	Tsunaki Fujimura; Japan	Lim Yoke Wai; Malaysia	Alireza Sarikhani; Iran
Kumite −70 kg	Yasuhisa Inada; Japan	Jasem Vishkaei; Iran	Shattyk Yeleussinov; Kazakhstan
Kumite −70 kg	Yasuhisa Inada; Japan	Jasem Vishkaei; Iran	Dhojman Moktan; Nepal
Kumite −75 kg	Ahmad Muneer; Kuwait	Mahendran Supremaniam; Malaysia	Doniyorbek Kholmatov; Uzbekistan
Kumite −75 kg	Ahmad Muneer; Kuwait	Mahendran Supremaniam; Malaysia	Nasser Khajeh-Hosseini; Iran
Kumite −80 kg	Ryosuke Shimizu; Japan	Ali Shaterzadeh; Iran	Nael Oweimer; Jordan
Kumite −80 kg	Ryosuke Shimizu; Japan	Ali Shaterzadeh; Iran	Khalid Falatah; Saudi Arabia
Kumite +80 kg	Jaber Al-Hammad; Kuwait	Mehran Behnamfar; Iran	Hassan Masoud; Jordan
Kumite +80 kg	Jaber Al-Hammad; Kuwait	Mehran Behnamfar; Iran	Azamat Kalandarov; Uzbekistan
Kumite open	Hassan Shaterzadeh; Iran	Sawanori Matsuzaki; Japan	Lin Huan-wei; Chinese Taipei
Kumite open	Hassan Shaterzadeh; Iran	Sawanori Matsuzaki; Japan	Kong Tai Moon; Malaysia
Team kumite	Japan	Kuwait	Jordan
Team kumite	Japan	Kuwait	Iran

=== Women ===
Event	Gold	Silver	Bronze
Individual kata	Atsuko Wakai; Japan	Tsai Yi-ling; Chinese Taipei	Chan Ka Hing; Hong Kong
Individual kata	Atsuko Wakai; Japan	Tsai Yi-ling; Chinese Taipei	Lim Lee Lee; Malaysia
Team kata	Japan; Kasuga Wakabayashi; Nao Morooka; Mayumi Asano	Indonesia; Endah Jubaedah; Iin Hasanah; Yulianti Syafrudin	Jordan; Marina Harb; Manar Shath; Rada Jasser
Team kata	Japan; Kasuga Wakabayashi; Nao Morooka; Mayumi Asano	Indonesia; Endah Jubaedah; Iin Hasanah; Yulianti Syafrudin	Malaysia; Lim Lee Lee; Jaclyn Ch'ng; Thoe Ai Poh
Kumite −48 kg	Sachiko Miyamoto; Japan	Ng Chai Lin; Malaysia	Jenny Zeannet; Indonesia
Kumite −48 kg	Sachiko Miyamoto; Japan	Ng Chai Lin; Malaysia	Hoàng Lê Thu Thuỷ; Vietnam
Kumite −53 kg	Irina Tishina; Kazakhstan	Mayuko Okamoto; Japan	Sandra Aryani; Indonesia
Kumite −53 kg	Irina Tishina; Kazakhstan	Mayuko Okamoto; Japan	Murugaiyan Srirajarajeswari; Malaysia
Kumite −60 kg	Kanako Iwakiri; Japan	Gretchen Malalad; Philippines	Premila Supramaniam; Malaysia
Kumite −60 kg	Kanako Iwakiri; Japan	Gretchen Malalad; Philippines	Sun Hsiao-yun; Chinese Taipei
Kumite +60 kg	Sofiya Kaspulatova; Uzbekistan	Agnes Tan; Malaysia	Natalya Solodilova; Kazakhstan
Kumite +60 kg	Sofiya Kaspulatova; Uzbekistan	Agnes Tan; Malaysia	Buthaina Al-Mahsiri; Jordan
Kumite open	Tomomi Shibuya; Japan	Sofiya Kaspulatova; Uzbekistan	Hà Thị Kiều Trang; Vietnam
Kumite open	Tomomi Shibuya; Japan	Sofiya Kaspulatova; Uzbekistan	Natalya Solodilova; Kazakhstan
Team kumite	Malaysia	Japan	Jordan
Team kumite	Malaysia	Japan	Kazakhstan

== Medal table ==
Rank	Nation	Gold	Silver	Bronze	Total
1	Japan	11	4	0	15
2	Malaysia	3	4	6	13
3	Kuwait	2	1	2	5
4	Iran	1	3	4	8
5	Kazakhstan	1	1	4	6
6	Uzbekistan	1	1	3	5
7	Chinese Taipei	0	2	3	5
7	Indonesia	0	2	3	5
9	Philippines	0	1	0	1
10	Jordan	0	0	6	6
11	Hong Kong	0	0	2	2
11	Vietnam	0	0	2	2
13	Brunei	0	0	1	1
13	Nepal	0	0	1	1
13	Saudi Arabia	0	0	1	1
Totals (15 entries)		19	19	38	76
