= 2004 Asian Karate Championships =

Karate competition

- Host city: Taoyuan, Taiwan
- Dates: 6–8 February 2004
- Main venue: Ching Yun University Gymnasium

The 2004 Asian Karate Championships are the sixth edition of the Asian Karate Championships, and were held in Taoyuan, Taiwan from 6 to 8 February 2004.

== Medalists ==
=== Men ===
| Event | Gold | Silver | Bronze |
|---|---|---|---|
| Individual kata | Hideto Tsuchiya; Japan | Lee Ta-chiun; Chinese Taipei | Myint Zaw Oo; Myanmar |
| Individual kata | Hideto Tsuchiya; Japan | Lee Ta-chiun; Chinese Taipei | Ku Jin Keat; Malaysia |
| Team kata | Japan | Myanmar | Chinese Taipei |
| Team kata | Japan | Myanmar | Iran |
| Kumite −55 kg | Otabek Kasimov; Uzbekistan | Puvaneswaran Ramasamy; Malaysia | Ahmad Akhavan; Iran |
| Kumite −55 kg | Otabek Kasimov; Uzbekistan | Puvaneswaran Ramasamy; Malaysia | Đỗ Hải Đức; Vietnam |
| Kumite −60 kg | Hassan Rouhani; Iran | Donny Dharmawan; Indonesia | Bader Al-Otaibi; Kuwait |
| Kumite −60 kg | Hassan Rouhani; Iran | Donny Dharmawan; Indonesia | Bakhtiyar Tokseitov; Kazakhstan |
| Kumite −65 kg | Norimitsu Takahashi; Japan | Asem Abujamous; Jordan | Hossein Rouhani; Iran |
| Kumite −65 kg | Norimitsu Takahashi; Japan | Asem Abujamous; Jordan | Lim Yoke Wai; Malaysia |
| Kumite −70 kg | Shinji Nagaki; Japan | Hsu Hsiang-ming; Chinese Taipei | I Ketut Murti; Indonesia |
| Kumite −70 kg | Shinji Nagaki; Japan | Hsu Hsiang-ming; Chinese Taipei | Mehdi Amouzadeh; Iran |
| Kumite −75 kg | Saeid Farrokhi; Iran | Mahendran Supremaniam; Malaysia | Talat Khalil; Jordan |
| Kumite −75 kg | Saeid Farrokhi; Iran | Mahendran Supremaniam; Malaysia | Rustam Gofurjonov; Uzbekistan |
| Kumite −80 kg | Ahmad Muneer; Kuwait | Jasem Vishkaei; Iran | Khalid Khalidov; Kazakhstan |
| Kumite −80 kg | Ahmad Muneer; Kuwait | Jasem Vishkaei; Iran | Turki Bukhari; Saudi Arabia |
| Kumite +80 kg | Umar Syarief; Indonesia | Andrey Korolev; Kazakhstan | Jaber Al-Hammad; Kuwait |
| Kumite +80 kg | Umar Syarief; Indonesia | Andrey Korolev; Kazakhstan | Maziar Elhami; Iran |
| Kumite open | Alireza Katiraei; Iran | Taiju Higuchi; Japan | Jaber Al-Hammad; Kuwait |
| Kumite open | Alireza Katiraei; Iran | Taiju Higuchi; Japan | Ilkhom Karimov; Uzbekistan |
| Team kumite | Japan | Iran | Indonesia |
| Team kumite | Japan | Iran | Kazakhstan |

=== Women ===
| Event | Gold | Silver | Bronze |
|---|---|---|---|
| Individual kata | Atsuko Wakai; Japan | Lim Lee Lee; Malaysia | Nguyễn Hoàng Ngân; Vietnam |
| Individual kata | Atsuko Wakai; Japan | Lim Lee Lee; Malaysia | Cheung Pui Si; Macau |
| Team kata | Japan | Macau | Chinese Taipei |
| Team kata | Japan | Macau | Vietnam |
| Kumite −48 kg | Telly Melinda; Indonesia | Hsieh Ai-chen; Chinese Taipei | Nazym Askarova; Kazakhstan |
| Kumite −48 kg | Telly Melinda; Indonesia | Hsieh Ai-chen; Chinese Taipei | She Lai Man; Hong Kong |
| Kumite −53 kg | Jenny Zeannet; Indonesia | Yanisa Torrattanawathana; Thailand | Sachiko Yamauchi; Japan |
| Kumite −53 kg | Jenny Zeannet; Indonesia | Yanisa Torrattanawathana; Thailand | Ha Ryon-bok; North Korea |
| Kumite −60 kg | Yuko Takahashi; Japan | Premila Supramaniam; Malaysia | Lin Kuan-chun; Chinese Taipei |
| Kumite −60 kg | Yuko Takahashi; Japan | Premila Supramaniam; Malaysia | Mai Thị Phương Liên; Vietnam |
| Kumite +60 kg | Sofiya Kaspulatova; Uzbekistan | Đình Thị Thu Thuỷ; Vietnam | Natalya Solodilova; Kazakhstan |
| Kumite +60 kg | Sofiya Kaspulatova; Uzbekistan | Đình Thị Thu Thuỷ; Vietnam | Yuko Okuda; Japan |
| Kumite open | Sofiya Kaspulatova; Uzbekistan | Natalya Solodilova; Kazakhstan | Maki Ogasawara; Japan |
| Kumite open | Sofiya Kaspulatova; Uzbekistan | Natalya Solodilova; Kazakhstan | Mai Thị Phương Liên; Vietnam |
| Team kumite | Japan | Indonesia | Chinese Taipei |
| Team kumite | Japan | Indonesia | Malaysia |

== Medal table ==
| Rank | Nation | Gold | Silver | Bronze | Total |
|---|---|---|---|---|---|
| 1 | Japan | 9 | 1 | 3 | 13 |
| 2 | Iran | 3 | 2 | 5 | 10 |
| 3 | Indonesia | 3 | 2 | 2 | 7 |
| 4 | Uzbekistan | 3 | 0 | 2 | 5 |
| 5 | Kuwait | 1 | 0 | 3 | 4 |
| 6 | Malaysia | 0 | 4 | 3 | 7 |
| 7 | Chinese Taipei | 0 | 3 | 4 | 7 |
| 8 | Kazakhstan | 0 | 2 | 5 | 7 |
| 9 | Vietnam | 0 | 1 | 5 | 6 |
| 10 | Jordan | 0 | 1 | 1 | 2 |
| 10 | Macau | 0 | 1 | 1 | 2 |
| 10 | Myanmar | 0 | 1 | 1 | 2 |
| 13 | Thailand | 0 | 1 | 0 | 1 |
| 14 | Hong Kong | 0 | 0 | 1 | 1 |
| 14 | North Korea | 0 | 0 | 1 | 1 |
| 14 | Saudi Arabia | 0 | 0 | 1 | 1 |
| Totals (16 entries) | | 19 | 19 | 38 | 76 |

== See also ==
- List of sporting events in Taiwan
