= 2007 Asian Karate Championships =

Karate competition

- Host city: Seremban, Malaysia
- Dates: 24–26 August 2007
- Main venue: Nilai Indoor Stadium

The 2007 Asian Karate Championships are the eighth edition of the Asian Karate Championships, and were held in Nilai Indoor Stadium, Seremban, Malaysia from August 24 to August 26, 2007.

== Medalists ==
=== Men ===
Event	Gold	Silver	Bronze
Individual kata	Takashi Katada; Japan	Ku Jin Keat; Malaysia	Dennies Ibrahim Sani; Indonesia
Individual kata	Takashi Katada; Japan	Ku Jin Keat; Malaysia	Mohsen Ashrafi; Iran
Team kata	Japan	Malaysia	Vietnam
Team kata	Japan	Malaysia	Kuwait
Kumite −55 kg	Puvaneswaran Ramasamy; Malaysia	Phạm Hoài Long; Vietnam	Hsieh Cheng-kang; Chinese Taipei
Kumite −55 kg	Puvaneswaran Ramasamy; Malaysia	Phạm Hoài Long; Vietnam	Abdullah Al-Mutairi; Kuwait
Kumite −60 kg	Keita Fujimoto; Japan	Sayed Hashim Al-Ali; Kuwait	Anuar Barmakbayev; Kazakhstan
Kumite −60 kg	Keita Fujimoto; Japan	Sayed Hashim Al-Ali; Kuwait	Mohd Fadillah Hj Sanif; Brunei
Kumite −65 kg	Lim Yoke Wai; Malaysia	Karem Othman; Syria	Abdullah Al-Otaibi; Kuwait
Kumite −65 kg	Lim Yoke Wai; Malaysia	Karem Othman; Syria	Takuro Nihei; Japan
Kumite −70 kg	Mansour Hassanbeigi; Iran	Bùi Việt Bằng; Vietnam	Gaspar Leong; Macau
Kumite −70 kg	Mansour Hassanbeigi; Iran	Bùi Việt Bằng; Vietnam	Atteayah Moaudi; Saudi Arabia
Kumite −75 kg	Nader Jodat; Iran	Hamad Al-Nweam; Kuwait	Ko Matsuhisa; Japan
Kumite −75 kg	Nader Jodat; Iran	Hamad Al-Nweam; Kuwait	Shaharudin Jamaludin; Malaysia
Kumite −80 kg	Maziar Elhami; Iran	Satoshi Ibuchi; Japan	Huang Hao-yun; Chinese Taipei
Kumite −80 kg	Maziar Elhami; Iran	Satoshi Ibuchi; Japan	Timur Bekov; Tajikistan
Kumite +80 kg	Ahmad Basheer; Kuwait	Ryosuke Shimizu; Japan	Jarvis Anak Julian; Malaysia
Kumite +80 kg	Ahmad Basheer; Kuwait	Ryosuke Shimizu; Japan	Ali Asadi; Iran
Kumite open	Jasem Vishkaei; Iran	Ahmad Muneer; Kuwait	Naowras Al-Hamwi; Syria
Kumite open	Jasem Vishkaei; Iran	Ahmad Muneer; Kuwait	Khalid Khalidov; Kazakhstan
Team kumite	Japan	Iran	United Arab Emirates
Team kumite	Japan	Iran	Kazakhstan

=== Women ===
Event	Gold	Silver	Bronze
Individual kata	Nao Morooka; Japan	Cheung Pui Si; Macau	Lim Lee Lee; Malaysia
Individual kata	Nao Morooka; Japan	Cheung Pui Si; Macau	Ng Pei Yi; Singapore
Team kata	Japan	Malaysia	Indonesia
Team kata	Japan	Malaysia	Vietnam
Kumite −48 kg	Vasantha Marial Anthony; Malaysia	Vũ Thị Nguyệt Ánh; Vietnam	Arisa Nishimura; Japan
Kumite −48 kg	Vasantha Marial Anthony; Malaysia	Vũ Thị Nguyệt Ánh; Vietnam	Martinel Prihastuti; Indonesia
Kumite −53 kg	Natsuki Fujiwara; Japan	Vathana Gopalasamy; Malaysia	Hsu Ching-chun; Chinese Taipei
Kumite −53 kg	Natsuki Fujiwara; Japan	Vathana Gopalasamy; Malaysia	Đào Thị Tú Anh; Vietnam
Kumite −60 kg	Yuka Sato; Japan	Regina Niyazova; Uzbekistan	Chan Ka Man; Hong Kong
Kumite −60 kg	Yuka Sato; Japan	Regina Niyazova; Uzbekistan	Nguyễn Thị Hải Yến; Vietnam
Kumite +60 kg	Ayaka Arai; Japan	Cherli Tugday; Philippines	Aliya Kuanova; Kazakhstan
Kumite +60 kg	Ayaka Arai; Japan	Cherli Tugday; Philippines	Jamaliah Jamaludin; Malaysia
Kumite open	Yamini Gopalasamy; Malaysia	Aliya Kuanova; Kazakhstan	Feng Lanlan; China
Kumite open	Yamini Gopalasamy; Malaysia	Aliya Kuanova; Kazakhstan	Yanisa Torrattanawathana; Thailand
Team kumite	Japan	Malaysia	Vietnam
Team kumite	Japan	Malaysia	Chinese Taipei

== Medal table ==
Rank	Nation	Gold	Silver	Bronze	Total
1	Japan	10	2	3	15
2	Malaysia	4	5	4	13
3	Iran	4	1	2	7
4	Kuwait	1	3	3	7
5	Vietnam	0	3	5	8
6	Kazakhstan	0	1	4	5
7	Macau	0	1	1	2
7	Syria	0	1	1	2
9	Philippines	0	1	0	1
9	Uzbekistan	0	1	0	1
11	Chinese Taipei	0	0	4	4
12	Indonesia	0	0	3	3
13	Brunei	0	0	1	1
13	China	0	0	1	1
13	Hong Kong	0	0	1	1
13	Saudi Arabia	0	0	1	1
13	Singapore	0	0	1	1
13	Tajikistan	0	0	1	1
13	Thailand	0	0	1	1
13	United Arab Emirates	0	0	1	1
Totals (20 entries)		19	19	38	76
