= 1999 Asian Karate Championships =

Karate competition

- Host city: Singapore
- Dates: 1–2 December 1999
- Main venue: Toa Payoh Sports Hall

The 1999 Asian Karate Championships are the fourth edition of the Asian Karate Championships, and were held in Singapore from 1 to 2 December 1999.

== Medalists ==
=== Men ===
| Event | Gold | Silver | Bronze |
|---|---|---|---|
| Individual kata | Ryoki Abe; Japan | Alaeddin Nekoufar; Iran | Ku Jin Keat; Malaysia |
| Team kata | Japan | Iran | Indonesia |
| Kumite −55 kg | Yousef Ataei; Iran | Lê Tùng Dương; Vietnam | Bader Al-Otaibi; Kuwait |
| Kumite −55 kg | Yousef Ataei; Iran | Lê Tùng Dương; Vietnam | Montree Thongchai; Thailand |
| Kumite −60 kg | Rouhollah Esfandiari; Iran | Trần Văn Thông; Vietnam | Khusniddin Sapiev; Uzbekistan |
| Kumite −60 kg | Rouhollah Esfandiari; Iran | Trần Văn Thông; Vietnam | Muralitharan Chandra; Malaysia |
| Kumite −65 kg | Norihide Narazaki; Japan | Shadi Al-Najjar; Jordan | Majid Abdolhosseini; Iran |
| Kumite −65 kg | Norihide Narazaki; Japan | Shadi Al-Najjar; Jordan | Nayef Al-Matrouk; Kuwait |
| Kumite −70 kg | Mehdi Amouzadeh; Iran | Yasu Hariu; Japan | Sonny Simangasing; Indonesia |
| Kumite −70 kg | Mehdi Amouzadeh; Iran | Yasu Hariu; Japan | Muniandy Rajoo; Malaysia |
| Kumite −75 kg | Alireza Katiraei; Iran | Novilus Tedius Yoku; Indonesia | Takahiro Niki; Japan |
| Kumite −75 kg | Alireza Katiraei; Iran | Novilus Tedius Yoku; Indonesia | Hsu Hsiang-ming; Chinese Taipei |
| Kumite −80 kg | Ali Shaterzadeh; Iran | Mohammed Hassan; United Arab Emirates | Alexander Arianthu; Malaysia |
| Kumite −80 kg | Ali Shaterzadeh; Iran | Mohammed Hassan; United Arab Emirates | Omar Boqorsain; Saudi Arabia |
| Kumite +80 kg | Benyamin Najibi Baher; Iran | Abdulmuttalib Al-Bargawi; Saudi Arabia | Kiyohiko Tosa; Japan |
| Kumite +80 kg | Benyamin Najibi Baher; Iran | Abdulmuttalib Al-Bargawi; Saudi Arabia | Nael Oweimer; Jordan |
| Kumite open | Toshihiro Mori; Japan | Maziar Farid-Khomami; Iran | Azamat Kalandarov; Uzbekistan |
| Kumite open | Toshihiro Mori; Japan | Maziar Farid-Khomami; Iran | Andrey Korolev; Kazakhstan |
| Team kumite | Japan | Indonesia | Chinese Taipei |
| Team kumite | Japan | Indonesia | Iran |

=== Women ===
| Event | Gold | Silver | Bronze |
|---|---|---|---|
| Individual kata | Atsuko Wakai; Japan | Lim Lee Lee; Malaysia | Fitria Mega; Indonesia |
| Team kata | Japan | Indonesia | Malaysia |
| Kumite −48 kg | Phạm Hồng Hà; Vietnam | Hsieh Ai-chen; Chinese Taipei | Sachiko Miyamoto; Japan |
| Kumite −48 kg | Phạm Hồng Hà; Vietnam | Hsieh Ai-chen; Chinese Taipei | Ng Chai Lin; Malaysia |
| Kumite −53 kg | Eri Fujioka; Japan | Murugaiyan Srirajarajeswari; Malaysia | Irina Tishina; Kazakhstan |
| Kumite −53 kg | Eri Fujioka; Japan | Murugaiyan Srirajarajeswari; Malaysia | Vũ Kim Anh; Vietnam |
| Kumite −60 kg | Yuya Hirata; Japan | Sun Hsiao-yun; Chinese Taipei | Gretchen Malalad; Philippines |
| Kumite −60 kg | Yuya Hirata; Japan | Sun Hsiao-yun; Chinese Taipei | Hà Thị Kiều Trang; Vietnam |
| Kumite +60 kg | Izumi Nabeki; Japan | Natalya Solodilova; Kazakhstan | June Moinjil; Malaysia |
| Kumite +60 kg | Izumi Nabeki; Japan | Natalya Solodilova; Kazakhstan | Phạm Hồng Thắm; Vietnam |
| Kumite open | Izumi Nabeki; Japan | Premila Supramaniam; Malaysia | Gretchen Malalad; Philippines |
| Kumite open | Izumi Nabeki; Japan | Premila Supramaniam; Malaysia | Vũ Kim Anh; Vietnam |
| Team kumite | Japan | Vietnam | Hong Kong |
| Team kumite | Japan | Vietnam | Kazakhstan |

== Medal table ==
| Rank | Nation | Gold | Silver | Bronze | Total |
|---|---|---|---|---|---|
| 1 | Japan | 12 | 1 | 3 | 16 |
| 2 | Iran | 6 | 3 | 2 | 11 |
| 3 | Vietnam | 1 | 3 | 4 | 8 |
| 4 | Malaysia | 0 | 3 | 7 | 10 |
| 5 | Indonesia | 0 | 3 | 3 | 6 |
| 6 | Chinese Taipei | 0 | 2 | 2 | 4 |
| 7 | Kazakhstan | 0 | 1 | 3 | 4 |
| 8 | Jordan | 0 | 1 | 1 | 2 |
| 8 | Saudi Arabia | 0 | 1 | 1 | 2 |
| 10 | United Arab Emirates | 0 | 1 | 0 | 1 |
| 11 | Kuwait | 0 | 0 | 2 | 2 |
| 11 | Philippines | 0 | 0 | 2 | 2 |
| 11 | Uzbekistan | 0 | 0 | 2 | 2 |
| 14 | Hong Kong | 0 | 0 | 1 | 1 |
| 14 | Thailand | 0 | 0 | 1 | 1 |
| Totals (15 entries) | | 19 | 19 | 34 | 72 |
