= Majid Abdolhosseini =

Iranian karateka (born 1972)

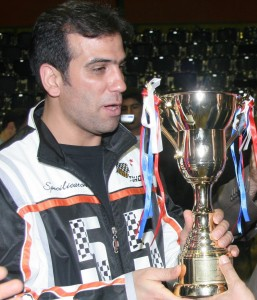

Personal information
- Full name: Majid Abdolhosseini
- Born: 10 March 1972 (age 54) Qom, Iran
- Years active: 1990–2006

Sport
- Country: Iran
- Sport: Karate
- Events: Individual kumite; Team kumite
- Club: Enghelab
- Coached by: Gholamreza Dabbaghian
Medal record
Men's karate
Representing Iran
Asian Championships
Gold medal – first place	1995 Philippines	Individual kumite
Silver medal – second place	1995 Philippines	Team kumite
Bronze medal – third place	1997 Macau	Individual kumite
Bronze medal – third place	1997 Macau	Team kumite
Bronze medal – third place	1999 Singapore	Individual kumite
Bronze medal – third place	1999 Singapore	Team kumite
Silver medal – second place	2004 Taiwan	Team kumite
Gold medal – first place	2005 Macau	Team kumite

Majid Abdolhosseini (Persian: مجید عبدالحسینی, born March 10, 1972) is a retired professional Iranian karateka. In 1995, Abdolhosseini won a gold medal in the Philippines and another gold medal in Macau in 2005.

Abdolhosseini competed in five world karate championships, in 1996 Rdyvzhanyrv Brazil, 1998 Sun City, South Africa, 2000 Munich, Germany, 2002 Madrid, Apain and 2004 Mexico and in five Asian Karate Championships, from 1995 to 2005 and the Asian games in Bangkok, Thailand in 1998.

From 1990 to 2006 Abdolhosseini was a player in the national team of Iran in numerous competitions: Karate World Championships, Asian Championships, Asian Games.

Abdolhosseni was appointed coach of the Iran under-21 karate team in March 2014.
