= 2006 World Karate Championships =

Karate competition

- Host city: Tampere, Finland
- Dates: 12–15 October
- Main venue: Tampereen jäähalli

The 2006 World Karate Championships are the 18th edition of the World Karate Championships, and were held in Tampere, Finland from October 12 to October 15, 2006.

== Medalists ==
=== Men ===
Event	Gold	Silver	Bronze
Individual kata	Luca Valdesi; Italy	Takashi Katada; Japan	Akio Tamashiro; Peru
Individual kata	Luca Valdesi; Italy	Takashi Katada; Japan	Antonio Díaz; Venezuela
Team kata	Italy; Vincenzo Figuccio; Lucio Maurino; Luca Valdesi	France; Julien Dupont; Ayoub Neghliz; Jonathan Plagnol	Japan
Team kata	Italy; Vincenzo Figuccio; Lucio Maurino; Luca Valdesi	France; Julien Dupont; Ayoub Neghliz; Jonathan Plagnol	Egypt
Kumite −60 kg	Hossein Rouhani; Iran	Gurban Taghiyev; Azerbaijan	Montassar Tabben; Tunisia
Kumite −60 kg	Hossein Rouhani; Iran	Gurban Taghiyev; Azerbaijan	Ibrahim Khalifa; Egypt
Kumite −65 kg	César Castaño; Spain	Luis Plumacher; Venezuela	Donny Dharmawan; Indonesia
Kumite −65 kg	César Castaño; Spain	Luis Plumacher; Venezuela	Marko Lučić; Croatia
Kumite −70 kg	Rafael Aghayev; Azerbaijan	Diego Vandeschrick; Belgium	Saeid Farrokhi; Iran
Kumite −70 kg	Rafael Aghayev; Azerbaijan	Diego Vandeschrick; Belgium	Takuro Nihei; Japan
Kumite −75 kg	Jasem Vishkaei; Iran	David Santana; Spain	El-Sayed El-Feky; Egypt
Kumite −75 kg	Jasem Vishkaei; Iran	David Santana; Spain	Ko Matsuhisa; Japan
Kumite −80 kg	Luigi Busà; Italy	Mohamed Abdelrahman; Egypt	Esmaeil Torkzad; Iran
Kumite −80 kg	Luigi Busà; Italy	Mohamed Abdelrahman; Egypt	Philippe Poirier; Canada
Kumite +80 kg	Marko Luhamaa; Estonia	Mohanad Magdy; Egypt	Stefano Maniscalco; Italy
Kumite +80 kg	Marko Luhamaa; Estonia	Mohanad Magdy; Egypt	Yann Baillon; France
Kumite open	Stefano Maniscalco; Italy	Daniël Sabanovic; Netherlands	Khalid Khalidov; Kazakhstan
Kumite open	Stefano Maniscalco; Italy	Daniël Sabanovic; Netherlands	Iván Leal; Spain
Team kumite	Spain; Iván Leal; Francisco Martínez; Óscar Martínez; Cristian Rodríguez; Antonio Sánchez; David Santana; Óscar Vázquez	Bosnia and Herzegovina	Egypt
Team kumite	Spain; Iván Leal; Francisco Martínez; Óscar Martínez; Cristian Rodríguez; Antonio Sánchez; David Santana; Óscar Vázquez	Bosnia and Herzegovina	England

=== Women ===
Event	Gold	Silver	Bronze
Individual kata	Sara Battaglia; Italy	Nguyễn Hoàng Ngân; Vietnam	Myriam Szkudlarek; France
Individual kata	Sara Battaglia; Italy	Nguyễn Hoàng Ngân; Vietnam	Eimi Kurita; United States
Team kata	France; Jessica Buil; Sabrina Buil; Laëtitia Guesnel	Japan	Spain; Miriam Cogolludo; Ruth Jiménez; Almudena Muñoz
Team kata	France; Jessica Buil; Sabrina Buil; Laëtitia Guesnel	Japan	Peru
Kumite −53 kg	Tomoko Araga; Japan	Selene Guglielmi; Italy	Heba El-Sayed; Egypt
Kumite −53 kg	Tomoko Araga; Japan	Selene Guglielmi; Italy	Kora Knühmann; Germany
Kumite −60 kg	Eva Medveďová; Slovakia	Nassim Varasteh; Canada	Diana Schwab; Switzerland
Kumite −60 kg	Eva Medveďová; Slovakia	Nassim Varasteh; Canada	Yuka Sato; Japan
Kumite +60 kg	Laurence Fischer; France	Ayaka Arai; Japan	Jessica Bratich; Australia
Kumite +60 kg	Laurence Fischer; France	Ayaka Arai; Japan	Tamara Filipović; Serbia
Kumite open	Yıldız Aras; Turkey	Yadira Lira; Mexico	Claudia Niţu; Romania
Kumite open	Yıldız Aras; Turkey	Yadira Lira; Mexico	Snežana Perić; Serbia
Team kumite	Japan	Spain; Gloria Casanova; Irene Colomar; Cristina Feo; Lucía Zamora	Germany; Jeannine Herrgesell; Kora Knühmann; Silvia Sperner; Nadine Ziemer
Team kumite	Japan	Spain; Gloria Casanova; Irene Colomar; Cristina Feo; Lucía Zamora	Switzerland; Fanny Clavien; Reta Duverney; Marilena Rubini; Diana Schwab

== Medal table ==
Rank	Nation	Gold	Silver	Bronze	Total
1	Italy	5	1	1	7
2	Japan	2	3	4	9
3	Spain	2	2	2	6
4	France	2	1	2	5
5	Iran	2	0	2	4
6	Azerbaijan	1	1	0	2
7	Estonia	1	0	0	1
7	Slovakia	1	0	0	1
7	Turkey	1	0	0	1
10	Egypt	0	2	5	7
11	Canada	0	1	1	2
11	Venezuela	0	1	1	2
13	Belgium	0	1	0	1
13	Bosnia and Herzegovina	0	1	0	1
13	Mexico	0	1	0	1
13	Netherlands	0	1	0	1
13	Vietnam	0	1	0	1
18	Germany	0	0	2	2
18	Peru	0	0	2	2
18	Serbia	0	0	2	2
18	Switzerland	0	0	2	2
22	Australia	0	0	1	1
22	Croatia	0	0	1	1
22	England	0	0	1	1
22	Indonesia	0	0	1	1
22	Kazakhstan	0	0	1	1
22	Romania	0	0	1	1
22	Tunisia	0	0	1	1
22	United States	0	0	1	1
Totals (29 entries)		17	17	34	68

== Participating nations ==
766 athletes from 81 nations competed.

- Andorra (2)
- Australia (11)
- Austria (11)
- Azerbaijan (9)
- Bangladesh (4)
- Belarus (13)
- Belgium (5)
- Bosnia and Herzegovina (16)
- Botswana (9)
- Brazil (24)
- Bulgaria (7)
- Canada (13)
- Chile (1)
- Chinese Taipei (6)
- Colombia (4)
- Congo (7)
- Croatia (24)
- Cyprus (3)
- Czech Republic (14)
- Denmark (5)
- Egypt (16)
- England (12)
- Estonia (11)
- Finland (11)
- France (24)
- Germany (19)
- Greece (12)
- Guatemala (7)
- Hong Kong (13)
- Hungary (3)
- Iceland (2)
- India (3)
- Indonesia (19)
- Iran (16)
- Ireland (3)
- Israel (2)
- Italy (16)
- Ivory Coast (8)
- Japan (19)
- Kazakhstan (10)
- Kuwait (12)
- Latvia (9)
- Libya (2)
- Luxembourg (1)
- Macau (11)
- Macedonia (8)
- Malaysia (14)
- Mexico (8)
- Montenegro (15)
- Morocco (1)
- Netherlands (11)
- Netherlands Antilles (1)
- New Zealand (4)
- Nicaragua (1)
- Norway (6)
- Pakistan (4)
- Peru (7)
- Philippines (6)
- Poland (9)
- Portugal (2)
- Qatar (7)
- Romania (3)
- Russia (22)
- Scotland (10)
- Senegal (13)
- Serbia (19)
- Seychelles (1)
- Slovakia (10)
- Slovenia (5)
- South Africa (16)
- South Korea (6)
- Spain (21)
- Sweden (16)
- Switzerland (13)
- Tunisia (8)
- Turkey (17)
- Ukraine (3)
- United States (16)
- Venezuela (11)
- Vietnam (1)
- Wales (2)
