= Karate at the 2001 World Games – Men's kumite 80 kg =

Karate men's kumite 80 kg at the 2001 World Games
- Venue: Tenno Town Gymnasium, Tenno, Akita, Japan
- Dates: 18 August 2001
- Competitors: 6 from 6 nations

Medalists
gold medal	(Italy) Salvatore Loria
silver medal	(United States) Billy Finegan
bronze medal	(Japan) Ryosuke Shimizu

The men's kumite 80 kg competition in karate at the 2001 World Games took place on 18 August 2001 at the Tenno Town Gymnasium in Tenno, Akita, Japan.

== Competition format ==
A total of 6 athletes entered the competition. In preliminary round they fought in two groups. Winners of this groups advanced to gold medal match. Second place athletes advanced to bronze medal match.

== Results ==
=== Preliminary round ===
==== Group A ====
Rank	Athlete	B	W	D	L	Pts	SP	ITA	AUS	GBR
1	Salvatore Loria (ITA)	2	2	0	0	4	11		W	W
2	Marco Mazzanti (AUS)	2	1	0	1	2	5	L		W
3	Paul Richards (GBR)	2	0	0	2	0	4	L	L	

==== Group B ====
Rank	Athlete	B	W	D	L	Pts	SP	USA	JPN	VEN
1	Billy Finegan (USA)	2	2	0	0	4	12		W	W
2	Ryosuke Shimizu (JPN)	2	1	0	1	2	10	L		W
3	Nguyen Rodriguez (VEN)	2	0	0	2	0	3	L	L	

=== Finals ===
	Score	
Gold medal match
Salvatore Loria (ITA)	5−4	Billy Finegan (USA)
Bronze medal match
Marco Mazzanti (AUS)	10−12	Ryosuke Shimizu (JPN)
