= Karate at the 2002 Asian Games – Women's kumite 60 kg =

Karate competition

Women's kumite 60 kg at the 2002 Asian Games
- Venue: Yangsan College Gymnasium
- Date: 11 October 2002
- Competitors: 7 from 7 nations

Medalists
gold medal	Premila Supramaniam	Malaysia
silver medal	Chan Ka Man	Hong Kong
bronze medal	Kwan Man Fei	Macau
bronze medal	Gretchen Malalad	Philippines

The women's kumite 60 kilograms competition at the 2002 Asian Games in Busan was held on 11 October at the Yangsan College Gymnasium.

== Schedule ==
All times are Korea Standard Time (UTC+09:00)

Date	Time	Event
Friday, 11 October 2002	15:30	1st preliminary round
Friday, 11 October 2002	15:30	Semifinals
Friday, 11 October 2002	15:30	Final repechage
Friday, 11 October 2002	15:30	Final

== Results ==
=== Main bracket ===
1st preliminary round		Semifinals		Final
		Chan Ka Man (HKG)	7
Kwan Man Fei (MAC)	2	Kwan Man Fei (MAC)	1
Aghadeer Haydar (SYR)	1			Chan Ka Man (HKG)	0
Nguyễn Thị Thu Trang (VIE)	0			Premila Supramaniam (MAS)	4
Premila Supramaniam (MAS)	1	Premila Supramaniam (MAS)	1
Gretchen Malalad (PHI)	3	Gretchen Malalad (PHI)	0
Vipavee Charagrang (THA)	2

=== Repechage ===
Final repechage
Bye
Kwan Man Fei (MAC)
Gretchen Malalad (PHI)	5
Nguyễn Thị Thu Trang (VIE)	3
