= 2005 Asian Karate Championships =

Karate competition

- Host city: Macau
- Dates: 19–22 May 2005

The 2005 Asian Karate Championships are the seventh edition of the Asian Karate Championships, and were held in Macau, China from 19 to 22 May 2005.

== Medalists ==
=== Men ===
Event	Gold	Silver	Bronze
Individual kata	Takashi Katada; Japan	Ku Jin Keat; Malaysia	Shen Chia-hao; Chinese Taipei
Individual kata	Takashi Katada; Japan	Ku Jin Keat; Malaysia	Mohsen Ashrafi; Iran
Team kata	Japan	Kuwait	Chinese Taipei
Team kata	Japan	Kuwait	Iran
Kumite −55 kg	Phạm Trần Nguyên; Vietnam	Hsieh Cheng-kang; Chinese Taipei	Majid Tahani; Iran
Kumite −55 kg	Phạm Trần Nguyên; Vietnam	Hsieh Cheng-kang; Chinese Taipei	Norman Montalvo; Philippines
Kumite −60 kg	Keita Fujimoto; Japan	Hossein Rouhani; Iran	Donny Dharmawan; Indonesia
Kumite −60 kg	Keita Fujimoto; Japan	Hossein Rouhani; Iran	Hussain Al-Qattan; Kuwait
Kumite −65 kg	Ayumi Kameyama; Japan	Mohsen Salimi; Iran	Shao Chih-kang; Chinese Taipei
Kumite −65 kg	Ayumi Kameyama; Japan	Mohsen Salimi; Iran	Lim Yoke Wai; Malaysia
Kumite −70 kg	Shinji Nagaki; Japan	Mehdi Amouzadeh; Iran	Mahendran Supremaniam; Malaysia
Kumite −70 kg	Shinji Nagaki; Japan	Mehdi Amouzadeh; Iran	Sherzod Kodirov; Uzbekistan
Kumite −75 kg	Ko Matsuhisa; Japan	Huang Hao-yun; Chinese Taipei	Charanjit Singh; India
Kumite −75 kg	Ko Matsuhisa; Japan	Huang Hao-yun; Chinese Taipei	Saeid Farrokhi; Iran
Kumite −80 kg	Nader Jodat; Iran	Ryosuke Shimizu; Japan	Ahmad Muneer; Kuwait
Kumite −80 kg	Nader Jodat; Iran	Ryosuke Shimizu; Japan	Farkhod Akhmetov; Uzbekistan
Kumite +80 kg	Jaber Al-Hammad; Kuwait	Lin Huan-wei; Chinese Taipei	Kiyohiko Tosa; Japan
Kumite +80 kg	Jaber Al-Hammad; Kuwait	Lin Huan-wei; Chinese Taipei	Mehran Behnamfar; Iran
Kumite open	Ali Shaterzadeh; Iran	Andrey Korolev; Kazakhstan	Jaber Al-Hammad; Kuwait
Kumite open	Ali Shaterzadeh; Iran	Andrey Korolev; Kazakhstan	Ilkhom Karimov; Uzbekistan
Team kumite	Iran	Japan	Kazakhstan
Team kumite	Iran	Japan	Kuwait

=== Women ===
Event	Gold	Silver	Bronze
Individual kata	Kasuga Wakabayashi; Japan	Nguyễn Hoàng Ngân; Vietnam	Stephanie Lim; Philippines
Individual kata	Kasuga Wakabayashi; Japan	Nguyễn Hoàng Ngân; Vietnam	Lim Lee Lee; Malaysia
Team kata	Japan	Malaysia	Macau
Team kata	Japan	Malaysia	Chinese Taipei
Kumite −48 kg	Vasantha Marial Anthony; Malaysia	Vũ Thị Nguyệt Ánh; Vietnam	Kou Man I Macau
Kumite −48 kg	Vasantha Marial Anthony; Malaysia	Vũ Thị Nguyệt Ánh; Vietnam	Rubporn Viriyaphant; Thailand
Kumite −53 kg	Natsuki Fujiwara; Japan	Đào Thị Tú Anh; Vietnam	Jenny Zeannet; Indonesia
Kumite −53 kg	Natsuki Fujiwara; Japan	Đào Thị Tú Anh; Vietnam	Yanisa Torrattanawathana; Thailand
Kumite −60 kg	Yuko Takahashi; Japan	Yamini Gopalasamy; Malaysia	Nguyễn Thị Hải Yến; Vietnam
Kumite −60 kg	Yuko Takahashi; Japan	Yamini Gopalasamy; Malaysia	Chan Ka Man; Hong Kong
Kumite +60 kg	Sofiya Kaspulatova; Uzbekistan	Natalya Solodilova; Kazakhstan	Emiko Honma; Japan
Kumite +60 kg	Sofiya Kaspulatova; Uzbekistan	Natalya Solodilova; Kazakhstan	Paula Carion; Macau
Kumite open	Sofiya Kaspulatova; Uzbekistan	Chan Ka Man; Hong Kong	Tomoko Araga; Japan
Kumite open	Sofiya Kaspulatova; Uzbekistan	Chan Ka Man; Hong Kong	Hsieh Ai-chen; Chinese Taipei
Team kumite	Japan	Malaysia	Thailand
Team kumite	Japan	Malaysia	Vietnam

== Medal table ==
Rank	Nation	Gold	Silver	Bronze	Total
1	Japan	11	2	3	16
2	Iran	3	3	5	11
3	Uzbekistan	2	0	3	5
4	Malaysia	1	4	3	8
5	Vietnam	1	3	2	6
6	Kuwait	1	1	4	6
7	Chinese Taipei	0	3	5	8
8	Kazakhstan	0	2	1	3
9	Hong Kong	0	1	1	2
10	Macau	0	0	3	3
10	Thailand	0	0	3	3
12	Indonesia	0	0	2	2
12	Philippines	0	0	2	2
14	India	0	0	1	1
Totals (14 entries)		19	19	38	76
