= Karate at the 2005 Islamic Solidarity Games =

Karate competition

Karate at the 2005 Islamic Solidarity Games was held at the Uhod Club Hall, Medina, Saudi Arabia from April 9 to April 14, 2005.

== Medalists ==
=== Kata ===
Event	Gold	Silver	Bronze
Individual	Mohsen Ashrafi; Iran	Sami Boughanem; Morocco	Karim Sherif; Egypt
Individual	Mohsen Ashrafi; Iran	Sami Boughanem; Morocco	Ku Jin Keat; Malaysia
Team	Iran	Malaysia	Algeria
Team	Iran	Malaysia	Egypt

=== Kumite ===
Event	Gold	Silver	Bronze
−55 kg	Puvaneswaran Ramasamy; Malaysia	Rinat Sagandykov; Kazakhstan	Faisal Al-Qanai; Saudi Arabia
−55 kg	Puvaneswaran Ramasamy; Malaysia	Rinat Sagandykov; Kazakhstan	Taoufik Boukhari; Morocco
−60 kg	Hossein Rouhani; Iran	Yusif Jafarov; Azerbaijan	Omer Moloud; Algeria
−60 kg	Hossein Rouhani; Iran	Yusif Jafarov; Azerbaijan	Abdulaziz Masoud; Saudi Arabia
−65 kg	Anouar Tadlaoui; Morocco	Walid Bakr; Egypt	Rafael Aghayev; Azerbaijan
−65 kg	Anouar Tadlaoui; Morocco	Walid Bakr; Egypt	Meshal Al-Handal; Kuwait
−70 kg	Mohamed Ibrahim; Egypt	Rashad Huseynov; Azerbaijan	Yahya Maydy; Saudi Arabia
−70 kg	Mohamed Ibrahim; Egypt	Rashad Huseynov; Azerbaijan	Mansour Hassanbeigi; Iran
−75 kg	Jeyhun Aghasiyev; Azerbaijan	Jasem Vishkaei; Iran	Yavuz Karamollaoğlu; Turkey
−75 kg	Jeyhun Aghasiyev; Azerbaijan	Jasem Vishkaei; Iran	Ammar Al-Sabsabi; Syria
−80 kg	Saeid Farrokhi; Iran	Adnan Tariq; Algeria	Mohamed Abdelrahman; Egypt
−80 kg	Saeid Farrokhi; Iran	Adnan Tariq; Algeria	Turki Bukhari; Saudi Arabia
+80 kg	Jaber Al-Hammad; Kuwait	Ismail Assissel; Morocco	Abdulmuttalib Al-Bargawi; Saudi Arabia
+80 kg	Jaber Al-Hammad; Kuwait	Ismail Assissel; Morocco	Sameh Shahin; Egypt
Open	Yusuf Başer; Turkey	Mehran Behnamfar; Iran	Abdullah Rizkallah; Saudi Arabia
Open	Yusuf Başer; Turkey	Mehran Behnamfar; Iran	Abdoulaye Diop; Senegal
Team	Iran; Mehran Behnamfar; Nader Jodat; Ali Shaterzadeh; Ali Azizi	Morocco	Algeria
Team	Iran; Mehran Behnamfar; Nader Jodat; Ali Shaterzadeh; Ali Azizi	Morocco	Egypt

== Medal table ==
Rank	Nation	Gold	Silver	Bronze	Total
1	Iran (IRI)	5	2	1	8
2	Morocco (MAR)	1	3	1	5
3	Azerbaijan (AZE)	1	2	1	4
4	Egypt (EGY)	1	1	5	7
5	Malaysia (MAS)	1	1	1	3
6	Kuwait (KUW)	1	0	1	2
6	Turkey (TUR)	1	0	1	2
8	Algeria (ALG)	0	1	3	4
9	Kazakhstan (KAZ)	0	1	0	1
10	Saudi Arabia (KSA)	0	0	6	6
11	Senegal (SEN)	0	0	1	1
11	Syria (SYR)	0	0	1	1
Totals (12 entries)		11	11	22	44
