= Karate at the 2002 Asian Games – Men's kumite 75 kg =

Karate competition

Men's kumite 75 kg at the 2002 Asian Games
- Venue: Yangsan College Gymnasium
- Date: 11 October 2002
- Competitors: 11 from 11 nations

Medalists
gold medal	Ahmad Muneer	Kuwait
silver medal	Jasem Vishkaei	Iran
bronze medal	Tong Kit Siong	Brunei
bronze medal	Kim Byung-chul	South Korea

The men's kumite 75 kilograms competition at the 2002 Asian Games in Busan was held on 11 October at the Yangsan College Gymnasium.

== Schedule ==
All times are Korea Standard Time (UTC+09:00)

Date	Time	Event
Friday, 11 October 2002	17:30	1st preliminary round
Friday, 11 October 2002	17:30	Quarterfinals
Friday, 11 October 2002	17:30	Semifinals
Friday, 11 October 2002	17:30	Final repechage
Friday, 11 October 2002	17:30	Final

== Results ==
Legend

- DQ — Won by disqualification

=== Main bracket ===
1st preliminary round
Che Yong-jung (PRK)	1
Farman Ahmed (PAK)	7
Rajesh Shrestha (NEP)	3^{DQ}
Dam Srichan (THA)	4
Kim Byung-chul (KOR)	10
Ismail Alloh (PLE)	1

Quarterfinals
Wahid Ahmad Joya (AFG)
Farman Ahmed (PAK)	DQ
Ahmad Muneer (KUW)	7
Tong Kit Siong (BRU)	1
Reza Rafati (QAT)	1
Rajesh Shrestha (NEP)	0
Kim Byung-chul (KOR)	4
Jasem Vishkaei (IRI)	6

Semifinals
Farman Ahmed (PAK)	0
Ahmad Muneer (KUW)	8
Reza Rafati (QAT)	0
Jasem Vishkaei (IRI)	2

Final
Ahmad Muneer (KUW)	0
Jasem Vishkaei (IRI)	0

=== Repechage ===
Final repechage
Tong Kit Siong (BRU)	9
Farman Ahmed (PAK)	5
Reza Rafati (QAT)	5
Kim Byung-chul (KOR)	6
