= 2002 World Karate Championships =

Karate competition

- Host city: Madrid, Spain
- Dates: 21–24 November

The 2002 World Karate Championships are the 16th edition of the World Karate Championships, and were held in Madrid, Spain from November 21 to November 24, 2002.

== Medalists ==
=== Men ===
| Event | Gold | Silver | Bronze |
|---|---|---|---|
| Individual kata | Takashi Katada; Japan | Javier Hernández; Spain | Antonio Díaz; Venezuela |
| Individual kata | Takashi Katada; Japan | Javier Hernández; Spain | Karim Sharif; Egypt |
| Team kata | Japan | Spain; Javier Hernández; Víctor López; Fernando San José | Croatia |
| Team kata | Japan | Spain; Javier Hernández; Víctor López; Fernando San José | Italy; Vincenzo Figuccio; Lucio Maurino; Luca Valdesi |
| Kumite −60 kg | Damien Dovy; Benin | Cécil Boulesnane; France | Paul Newby; England |
| Kumite −60 kg | Damien Dovy; Benin | Cécil Boulesnane; France | Hossein Rouhani; Iran |
| Kumite −65 kg | George Kotaka; United States | Lazar Boskovic; Germany | Andrea Calzola; Italy |
| Kumite −65 kg | George Kotaka; United States | Lazar Boskovic; Germany | Mehdi Amouzadeh; Iran |
| Kumite −70 kg | Md Golam Zakaria; Italy | Junior Lefevre; Croatia | Óscar Vázquez; Spain |
| Kumite −70 kg | Md Golam Zakaria; Italy | Junior Lefevre; Croatia | Messaoud Hammou; France |
| Kumite −75 kg | Iván Leal; Spain | Jasem Vishkaei; Iran | Köksal Çakır; Germany |
| Kumite −75 kg | Iván Leal; Spain | Jasem Vishkaei; Iran | İsmail Hakkı Şen; Turkey |
| Kumite −80 kg | Yann Baillon; France | Daniël Sabanovic; Netherlands | Zeynel Çelik; Turkey |
| Kumite −80 kg | Yann Baillon; France | Daniël Sabanovic; Netherlands | Miloš Živković; Yugoslavia |
| Kumite +80 kg | Leon Walters; England | Alexander Gerunov; Russia | Jan Tuček; Czech Republic |
| Kumite +80 kg | Leon Walters; England | Alexander Gerunov; Russia | Seydina Baldé; France |
| Kumite open | Predrag Stojadinov; Yugoslavia | Daniel Devigili; Austria | Konstantinos Papadopoulos; Greece |
| Kumite open | Predrag Stojadinov; Yugoslavia | Daniel Devigili; Austria | Klaudio Farmadín; Slovakia |
| Team kumite | Spain; Tomás Herrero; Iván Leal; Francisco Martínez; Óscar Martínez; Ángel Ramiro; David Santana; Óscar Vázquez | England | France; Yann Baillon; Seydina Baldé; Olivier Beaudry; Rida Bel Lahsen; Alexandre Biamonti; David Félix; Messaoud Hammou |
| Team kumite | Spain; Tomás Herrero; Iván Leal; Francisco Martínez; Óscar Martínez; Ángel Ramiro; David Santana; Óscar Vázquez | England | Iran; Mehdi Amouzadeh; Mehran Behnamfar; Maziar Elhami; Alireza Katiraei; Nasser Khajeh-Hosseini; Hassan Shaterzadeh; Jasem Vishkaei |

=== Women ===
| Event | Gold | Silver | Bronze |
|---|---|---|---|
| Individual kata | Atsuko Wakai; Japan | Myriam Szkudlarek; France | Marcela Remiášová; Slovakia |
| Individual kata | Atsuko Wakai; Japan | Myriam Szkudlarek; France | Yohana Sánchez; Venezuela |
| Team kata | France; Jessica Buil; Sabrina Buil; Laëtitia Guesnel | Japan | Italy; Luisa Arrabito; Alessia Gasperini; Annalisa Penolazzi |
| Team kata | France; Jessica Buil; Sabrina Buil; Laëtitia Guesnel | Japan | Spain; Miriam Cogolludo; Ruth Jiménez; Almudena Muñoz |
| Kumite −53 kg | Kora Knühmann; Germany | Michela Nanni; Italy | Sandu Anghel; Romania |
| Kumite −53 kg | Kora Knühmann; Germany | Michela Nanni; Italy | Nadia Mecheri; France |
| Kumite −60 kg | Nathalie Leroy; France | Ibtissem Hannachi; Tunisia | Yoko Takahashi; Japan |
| Kumite −60 kg | Nathalie Leroy; France | Ibtissem Hannachi; Tunisia | Alexandra Witteborn; Germany |
| Kumite +60 kg | Elisa Au; United States | Zsuzsanna Klima; Hungary | Lucélia Ribeiro; Brazil |
| Kumite +60 kg | Elisa Au; United States | Zsuzsanna Klima; Hungary | Laurence Fischer; France |
| Kumite open | Snežana Perić; Yugoslavia | Tessy Scholtes; Luxembourg | Roberta Minet; Italy |
| Kumite open | Snežana Perić; Yugoslavia | Tessy Scholtes; Luxembourg | Premila Supramaniam; Malaysia |
| Team kumite | Spain; Gloria Casanova; Cristina Feo; Noelia Fernández; Estefanía García | France; Patricia Chéreau; Laurence Fischer; Nathalie Leroy; Nadia Mecheri | Turkey; Yıldız Aras; Gülderen Çelik; Meral Ölmez |
| Team kumite | Spain; Gloria Casanova; Cristina Feo; Noelia Fernández; Estefanía García | France; Patricia Chéreau; Laurence Fischer; Nathalie Leroy; Nadia Mecheri | England |

== Medal table ==
| Rank | Nation | Gold | Silver | Bronze | Total |
|---|---|---|---|---|---|
| 1 | France | 3 | 3 | 5 | 11 |
| 2 | Spain | 3 | 2 | 2 | 7 |
| 3 | Japan | 3 | 1 | 1 | 5 |
| 4 | Yugoslavia | 2 | 0 | 1 | 3 |
| 5 | United States | 2 | 0 | 0 | 2 |
| 6 | Italy | 1 | 1 | 4 | 6 |
| 7 | England | 1 | 1 | 2 | 4 |
| 7 | Germany | 1 | 1 | 2 | 4 |
| 9 | Benin | 1 | 0 | 0 | 1 |
| 10 | Iran | 0 | 1 | 3 | 4 |
| 11 | Croatia | 0 | 1 | 1 | 2 |
| 12 | Austria | 0 | 1 | 0 | 1 |
| 12 | Hungary | 0 | 1 | 0 | 1 |
| 12 | Luxembourg | 0 | 1 | 0 | 1 |
| 12 | Netherlands | 0 | 1 | 0 | 1 |
| 12 | Russia | 0 | 1 | 0 | 1 |
| 12 | Tunisia | 0 | 1 | 0 | 1 |
| 18 | Turkey | 0 | 0 | 3 | 3 |
| 19 | Slovakia | 0 | 0 | 2 | 2 |
| 19 | Venezuela | 0 | 0 | 2 | 2 |
| 21 | Brazil | 0 | 0 | 1 | 1 |
| 21 | Czech Republic | 0 | 0 | 1 | 1 |
| 21 | Egypt | 0 | 0 | 1 | 1 |
| 21 | Greece | 0 | 0 | 1 | 1 |
| 21 | Malaysia | 0 | 0 | 1 | 1 |
| 21 | Romania | 0 | 0 | 1 | 1 |
| Totals (26 entries) | | 17 | 17 | 34 | 68 |

== Participating nations ==
751 athletes from 84 nations competed.

- Albania (1)
- Algeria (16)
- Andorra (4)
- Argentina (7)
- Australia (20)
- Austria (15)
- Azerbaijan (7)
- Bangladesh (4)
- Belarus (9)
- Belgium (8)
- Benin (1)
- Bermuda (5)
- Bosnia and Herzegovina (11)
- Brazil (15)
- Bulgaria (8)
- Cameroon (2)
- Canada (12)
- Chile (3)
- Chinese Taipei (10)
- Colombia (1)
- Congo (7)
- Costa Rica (1)
- Croatia (18)
- Cyprus (2)
- Czech Republic (12)
- Denmark (4)
- Egypt (15)
- England (19)
- Estonia (8)
- Finland (10)
- France (20)
- Gabon (9)
- Georgia (2)
- Germany (19)
- Greece (12)
- Hong Kong (5)
- Hungary (4)
- Iceland (3)
- India (6)
- Indonesia (6)
- Iran (12)
- Ireland (4)
- Italy (20)
- Ivory Coast (8)
- Japan (19)
- Jordan (8)
- Kazakhstan (7)
- Luxembourg (4)
- Macau (3)
- Macedonia (9)
- Malaysia (13)
- Malta (1)
- Mexico (10)
- Morocco (10)
- Netherlands (9)
- New Zealand (7)
- Norway (5)
- Peru (8)
- Poland (5)
- Portugal (11)
- Qatar (3)
- Romania (8)
- Russia (16)
- Rwanda (5)
- San Marino (2)
- Scotland (16)
- Senegal (15)
- Slovakia (12)
- Slovenia (4)
- South Africa (12)
- South Korea (6)
- Spain (19)
- Sweden (4)
- Switzerland (12)
- Tunisia (12)
- Turkey (19)
- Ukraine (18)
- United Arab Emirates (8)
- United States (12)
- Uzbekistan (7)
- Venezuela (2)
- Vietnam (4)
- Wales (3)
- Yugoslavia (18)
