= Karate at the 2002 Asian Games – Women's kata =

Karate competition

Women's kata at the 2002 Asian Games
- Venue: Yangsan College Gymnasium
- Date: 11 October 2002
- Competitors: 6 from 6 nations

Medalists
gold medal	Atsuko Wakai	Japan
silver medal	Lim Lee Lee	Malaysia
bronze medal	Cheung Pui Si	Macau
bronze medal	Cherli Tugday	Philippines

The women's individual kata competition at the 2002 Asian Games in Busan was held on 11 October at the Yangsan College Gymnasium.

== Schedule ==
All times are Korea Standard Time (UTC+09:00)

Date	Time	Event
Friday, 11 October 2002	09:00	1st preliminary round
Friday, 11 October 2002	09:00	Semifinals
Friday, 11 October 2002	09:00	Final repechage
Friday, 11 October 2002	14:45	Final

== Results ==
=== Main bracket ===
1st preliminary round		Semifinals		Final
		Lim Lee Lee (MAS)	3
Chan Ka Hing (HKG)	0	Cheung Pui Si (MAC)	0
Cheung Pui Si (MAC)	3			Lim Lee Lee (MAS)	0
Atsuko Wakai (JPN)	3			Atsuko Wakai (JPN)	3
Cherli Tugday (PHI)	0	Atsuko Wakai (JPN)	3
		Mariam Abdulqader (UAE)	0

=== Repechage ===
Final repechage
Bye
Cheung Pui Si (MAC)
Mariam Abdulqader (UAE)	0
Cherli Tugday (PHI)	3
