= Marko Luhamaa =

Estonian karateka

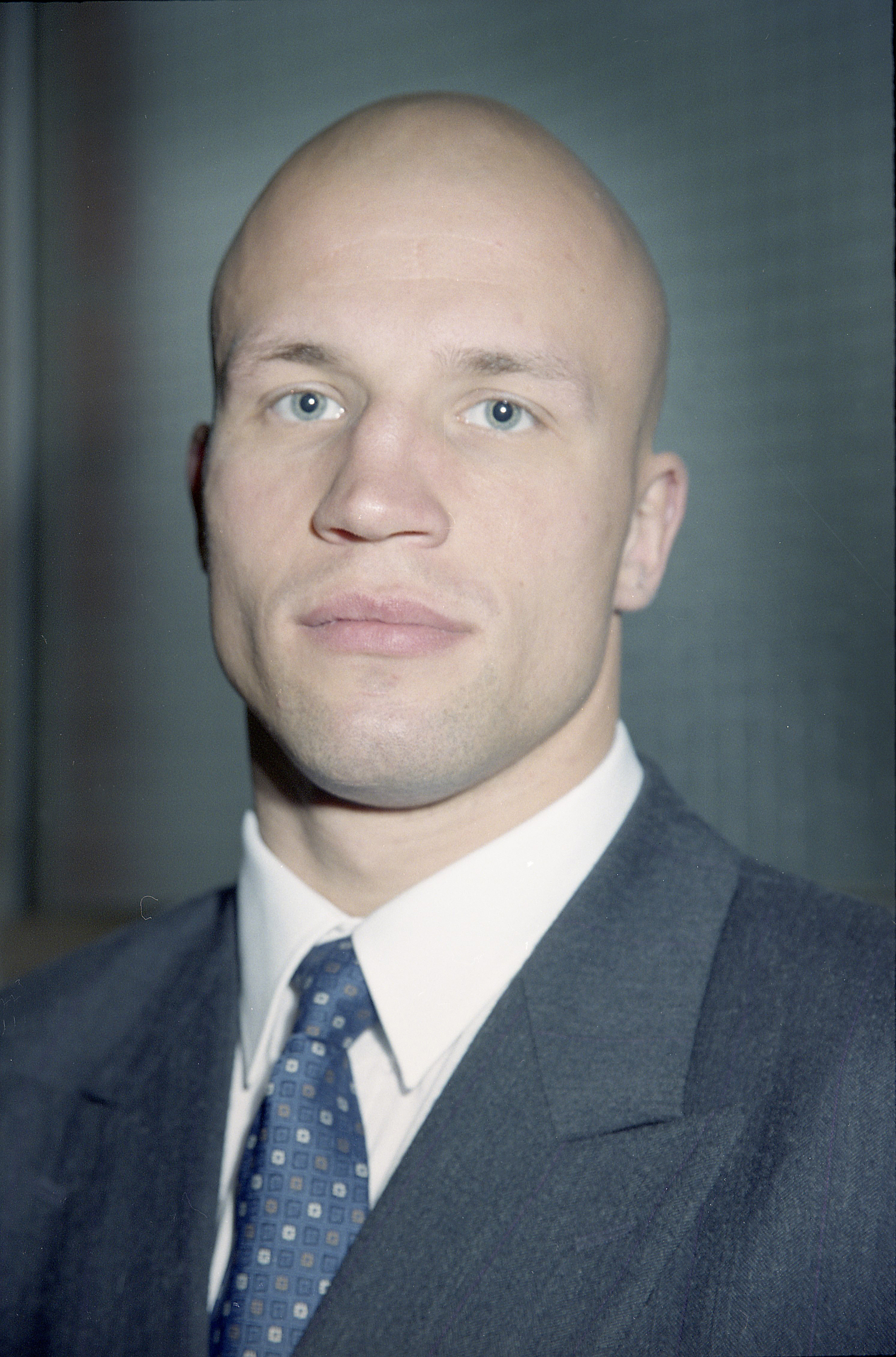
Marko Luhamaa

Marko Luhamaa (born 17 April 1975) is an Estonian karateka.

He was born in Tartu. In 1998 he graduated from the University of Tartu's Institute of Physical Education.

He began his karate career under the guidance of Jüri Posti. Earlier (1984–1993) he practiced modern pentathlon. He won 2006 World Karate Championships. He is multiple-times Estonian champion. 1995–2010 he was a member of Estonian national karate team.

1996-1999 and 2000-2007 he was named as Best Karateka of Estonia.
