= George Kotaka =

American karateka (born 1977)

- Born: July 28, 1977 (age 49); Honolulu, Hawaii, United States
- Style: Shitō-ryū Karate
- Teacher: Chuzo Kotaka
- Rank: 4th dan karate

Other information
- Website: Official site

George Kotaka (born July 28, 1977, Honolulu, Hawaii, United States) is an American karateka. He has a 4th Dan black belt in karate and is the winner of multiple World Karate Championships and appeared in the documentary Empty Hand: The Real Karate Kids.

== Achievements ==
- 2002 World Karate Championships Kumite Gold Medal
- 2008 World Karate Championships Gold Medal
