= Binibining Pilipinas 2003 =

- Date: March 15, 2003
- Presenters: TJ Manotoc; Pops Fernandez; Brad Turvey
- Entertainment: Gary Valenciano
- Venue: Araneta Coliseum, Quezon City, Philippines
- Broadcaster: GMA Network
- Entrants: 27
- Placements: 12
- Winner: Carla Gay Balingit; Angeles City
- Congeniality: Carolyn Ramos; Quezon City
- Photogenic: Jhezarie Javier; Antipolo

Binibining Pilipinas 2003 (billed as The Ruby Year) was the 40th edition of Binibining Pilipinas. It took place at the Smart Araneta Coliseum in Quezon City, Metro Manila, Philippines on March 15, 2003.

At the end of the event, Karen Loren Agustin crowned Carla Gay Balingit as Binibining Pilipinas Universe 2003. Katherine Anne Manalo crowned Maria Rafaela Yunon as Binibining Pilipinas World 2003, while Kristine Alzar crowned Jhezarie Javier as Bb. Pilipinas-International 2003. Kate Sephora Baesa was named First Runner-Up, while Noela Mae Evangelista was named Second Runner-Up.

Later that year, Noela Mae Evangelista was appointed as Binibining Pilipinas Queen of Tourism 2003.

== Results ==
Color keys

- The contestant Won in an International pageant.
- The contestant was a Runner-up in an International pageant.
- The contestant did not place.

| Placement | Contestant | International Placement |
|---|---|---|
| Binibining Pilipinas Universe 2003 | Bb. #23 – Carla Gay Balingit | Unplaced – Miss Universe 2003 |
| Binibining Pilipinas World 2003 | Bb. #19 – Maria Rafaela Yunon | Top 5 – Miss World 2003 |
| Binibining Pilipinas-International 2003 | Bb. #12 – Jhezarie Javier | Unplaced – Miss International 2003 |
| 1st Runner-Up | Bb. #13 – Kate Sephora Baesa | |
| 2nd Runner-Up | Bb. #20 – Noela Mae Evangelista (Appointed as Binibining Pilipinas Queen of Tourism 2003) | Winner – Queen of Tourism International 2003 |
| Top 12 | Bb. #1 – Maria del Carmen Antigua; Bb. #15 – Anne Marie Falcon; Bb. #16 – Sanya Astra Smith; Bb. #17 – Ariane Garcia; Bb. #18 – Angelina Louise Corstorphan; Bb. #24 – Diana Sadie; Bb. #25 – Maria Elena Andaya | |

=== Special awards ===
| Award | Contestant | Ref. |
|---|---|---|
| Best in Swimsuit | Bb. #18 – Angelina Corstorphan | |
| Best in Evening Gown | Bb. #23 – Carla Gay Balingit | |
| Miss Photogenic/AGFA | Bb. #12 – Jhezarie Javier | |
| Miss Friendship | Bb. #10 – Carolyn Ramos | |
| Miss Talent | Bb. #22 – Gretchen Malalad | |
| Miss Lux Super Rich Star of the Night | Bb. #19 – Maria Rafaela Yunon | |
| Miss Creamsilk Beautiful Hair | Bb. #25 – Maria Elena Andaya | |
| Miss Pond's Beautiful Skin | Bb. #18 – Angelina Corstorphan | |
| Miss Close-Up Smile | Bb. #20 – Noela Mae Evangelista | |
| Binibining Avon | Bb. #20 – Noela Mae Evangelista | |
| Miss PAL Sunniest Personality | Bb. #12 – Jhezarie Javier | |
| Miss Red Bull Supreme Energy | Bb. #22 – Gretchen Malalad | |
| Miss Myra 300-E | Bb. #12 – Jhezarie Javier | |
| Manila Bulletin Texter's Choice Award | Bb. #14 – Jacquelyne Inoferio | |

== Contestants ==
27 contestants competed for the three titles.

| No. | Contestant | Age | City/Province | Placement |
|---|---|---|---|---|
| 1 | Maria del Carmen Antigua | 24 | Cebu City | Top 12 |
| 2 | Anna Kathrina Ashby | 19 | Quezon City | |
| 3 | Cherry May Bacarro | 24 | Cagayan de Oro | |
| 4 | Aloha Crisostomo | 24 | Angeles City | |
| 5 | Nilda Perelonia Baliwag | 20 | Makati | |
| 6 | Farrah Casilda Tuballa | 19 | Zamboanga City | |
| 7 | Gladys Cruz | 20 | Bulacan | |
| 8 | Ruth Faye Toribio | 22 | Quezon City | |
| 9 | Jeramie Cortes Alagon | 20 | Zambales | |
| 10 | Carolyn Ramos | 22 | Quezon City | |
| 11 | Penelope Grulla | 24 | Manila | |
| 12 | Jhezarie Javier | 21 | Antipolo | Binibining Pilipinas International 2003 |
| 13 | Kate Sephora Baesa | 20 | Quezon City | 1st Runner-Up |
| 14 | Jacquelyne Inoferio | 19 | San Pedro, Laguna | |
| 15 | Anne Marie Falcon | 21 | Mandaluyong | Top 12 |
| 16 | Sanya Astra Smith | 18 | Makati | Top 12 |
| 17 | Ariane Garcia | 18 | Lucena | Top 12 |
| 18 | Angelina Louise Corstorphan | 17 | Pasig | Top 12 |
| 19 | Maria Rafaela Yunon | 21 | Tarlac | Binibining Pilipinas World 2003 |
| 20 | Noela Mae Evangelista | 20 | Iligan | 2nd Runner-Up |
| 21 | Angelica Sandel | 21 | San Juan | |
| 22 | Gretchen Malalad | 24 | Pasig | |
| 23 | Carla Gay Balingit | 19 | Angeles City | Binibining Pilipinas Universe 2003 |
| 24 | Diana Sadie | 20 | Bicol Region | Top 12 |
| 25 | Maria Elena Andaya | 24 | Batangas City | Top 12 |
| 26 | Maria Althea Rose Mauricio | 21 | Bacolod | |
| 27 | Joy delos Reyes | 20 | Makati | |

== Notes ==
=== Post-pageant notes ===
- Carla Gay Balingit competed at Miss Universe 2003 in Panama City but was unplaced. On the other hand, Maria Rafaela Yunon competed at Miss World 2003 in Sanya, China and was one of the five finalists.
- Jhezarie Javier competed at Miss International 2003 in Tokyo but was unplaced. She then was handpicked to compete at the Miss ASEAN 2005 pageant in Bali, Indonesia. She was crowned Miss ASEAN 2005 and also won the Miss Natural Beauty award.
- Noela Mae Evangelista competed at Queen of Tourism International 2003 in Turkey and won.
