= Karate at the 2010 Asian Games – Women's kumite 61 kg =

Karate competition

Women's kumite 61 kg at the 2010 Asian Games
- Venue: Guangdong Gymnasium
- Date: 26 November 2010
- Competitors: 15 from 15 nations

Medalists
gold medal	Yu Miyamoto	Japan
silver medal	Yamini Gopalasamy	Malaysia
bronze medal	Chan Ka Man	Hong Kong
bronze medal	Barno Mirzaeva	Uzbekistan

The women's kumite 61 kilograms competition at the 2010 Asian Games in Guangzhou, China was held on 26 November 2010 at the Guangdong Gymnasium.

== Schedule ==
All times are China Standard Time (UTC+08:00)

Date	Time	Event
Friday, 26 November 2010	14:00	1/8 finals
Friday, 26 November 2010	14:00	Quarterfinals
Friday, 26 November 2010	14:00	Semifinals
Friday, 26 November 2010	14:00	Repechage 1
Friday, 26 November 2010	14:00	Bronze medal match
Friday, 26 November 2010	14:00	Final

== Results ==
=== Main bracket ===
1/8 finals
Chan Ka Man (HKG)	5
Nahid Behrooz (AFG)	0
Diana Nakhle (SYR)	1
Choi Cho-rong (KOR)	7
Zeng Cuilan (CHN)	0
Chang Ting (TPE)	2
Yu Miyamoto (JPN)	3
Daria Dmitrichenko (KGZ)	0
Zuhriia Mshenesh (PLE)	4
Sumithra Sekar (IND)	0
Bùi Thị Triều (VIE)	6
Ganga Devi Adhikari (NEP)	0
Barno Mirzaeva (UZB)	5
Tantri Widyasari (INA)	1

Quarterfinals
Yamini Gopalasamy (MAS)	3
Chan Ka Man (HKG)	1
Choi Cho-rong (KOR)	0
Chang Ting (TPE)	5
Yu Miyamoto (JPN)	8
Zuhriia Mshenesh (PLE)	0
Bùi Thị Triều (VIE)	1
Barno Mirzaeva (UZB)	2

Semifinals
Yamini Gopalasamy (MAS)	5
Chang Ting (TPE)	4
Yu Miyamoto (JPN)	8
Barno Mirzaeva (UZB)	0

Final
Yamini Gopalasamy (MAS)	0
Yu Miyamoto (JPN)	7

=== Repechage ===
Repechage 1
Daria Dmitrichenko (KGZ)	0
Zuhriia Mshenesh (PLE)	3

Bronze medal match
Chan Ka Man (HKG)	4
Chang Ting (TPE)	1
Zuhriia Mshenesh (PLE)	0
Barno Mirzaeva (UZB)	2
