= Hossein Rouhani =

Iranian karateka (born 1983)

Medal record

Representing Iran

Men's Karate

World Championships
Gold medal – first place	2006 Tampere	-60 kg
Silver medal – second place	2004 Monterrey	-60 kg
Bronze medal – third place	2002 Madrid	-60 kg
Bronze medal – third place	2008 Tokyo	-60 kg

Asian Games
Gold medal – first place	2006 Doha	-60 kg
Silver medal – second place	2002 Busan	-60 kg

Asian Championships
Silver medal – second place	2004 Taoyuan	-60 kg
Silver medal – second place	2005 Macau	-60 kg

Islamic Solidarity Games
Gold medal – first place	2005 Medina	-60 kg

West Asian Games
Gold medal – first place	2002 Kuwait City	-60 kg

Hossein Rouhani (Persian: حسین روحانی, also Romanized as "Hoseyn Rūhānī"; born August 19, 1983, in Tehran) is an Iranian karateka who competed in the 2006 Asian Games in the 60 kg division and won the gold medal. He is originally from the city of Zanjan.

== Personal life ==
On 8 February 2026, Hosseini posted a joint Instagram statement with fellow karateka Hassan Rouhani and Mehran Behnamfar concerning the arrest of fellow world karate champion Jasem Vishkaei for supporting the 2025–2026 Iranian protests, stating that "Jasem has done nothing but serve Iran. Heroes have no place in prison.".
