= Karate at the 2002 Asian Games – Men's kumite 70 kg =

Karate competition

Men's kumite 70 kg at the 2002 Asian Games
- Venue: Yangsan College Gymnasium
- Date: 12 October 2002
- Competitors: 12 from 12 nations

Medalists
gold medal	Alireza Katiraei	Iran
silver medal	Shattyk Kazhymukanov	Kazakhstan
bronze medal	Hsu Hsiang-ming	Chinese Taipei
bronze medal	Magid Adwan	Qatar

The men's kumite 70 kilograms competition at the 2002 Asian Games in Busan was held on 12 October at the Yangsan College Gymnasium.

== Schedule ==
All times are Korea Standard Time (UTC+09:00)

Date	Time	Event
Saturday, 12 October 2002	15:00	1st preliminary round
Saturday, 12 October 2002	15:00	Quarterfinals
Saturday, 12 October 2002	15:00	Semifinals
Saturday, 12 October 2002	15:00	1st repechage
Saturday, 12 October 2002	15:00	Final repechage
Saturday, 12 October 2002	16:30	Final

== Results ==
=== Main bracket ===
1st preliminary round
Jin Min-kyu (KOR)	9
Sonny Simangasing (INA)	8
O Song-ju (PRK)	0
Tarik Ammar (PLE)	8
Ravi Maharjan (NEP)	2
Ryan Bonifacio Mariano (PHI)	1
Magid Adwan (QAT)	0
Alireza Katiraei (IRI)	3

Quarterfinals
Shattyk Kazhymukanov (KAZ)	8
Jin Min-kyu (KOR)	4
Tarik Ammar (PLE)	1
Hsu Hsiang-ming (TPE)	9
Chamal Suranga Silva (SRI)	0
Ravi Maharjan (NEP)	8
Alireza Katiraei (IRI)	4
Fuad Al-Sharabi (YEM)	0

Semifinals
Shattyk Kazhymukanov (KAZ)	6
Hsu Hsiang-ming (TPE)	0
Ravi Maharjan (NEP)	2
Alireza Katiraei (IRI)	4

Final
Shattyk Kazhymukanov (KAZ)	0
Alireza Katiraei (IRI)	2

=== Repechage ===
1st repechage
Fuad Al-Sharabi (YEM)	0
Magid Adwan (QAT)	2

Final repechage
Jin Min-kyu (KOR)	6
Hsu Hsiang-ming (TPE)	8
Ravi Maharjan (NEP)	0
Magid Adwan (QAT)	9
