= Maziar Elhami =

Iranian karateka (born 1981)

Maziar Elhami Varmazani
- Born: 16 June 1981 (age 45); Kermanshah, Iran
- Style: Kumite
- Teacher: Shahab Soltani
- Rank: Black belt, 5th dan

Maziar Elhami
Medal record

Representing Iran

Men's Karate

World Championships
Bronze medal – third place	2012 paris	Team kumite
Bronze medal – third place	2002 Madrid	Team kumite

World Karate Club's Championships
Silver medal – second place	2012 Turkey	Team kumite

Karate1 Premier League
Bronze medal – third place	2012 Turkey	kumite 84 kg
Gold medal – first place	2009 Turkey	kumite 84 kg

Asian Championships
Gold medal – first place	2007 Malesia	kumite 84 kg
Silver medal – second place	2007 Malesia	Team kumite
Bronze medal – third place	2004 Taiwan	kumite 84 kg
Silver medal – second place	2004 Taiwan	Team kumite

Open karate championships
Gold medal – first place	2016 Russia	kumite 84kg
Gold medal – first place	2006 Turkey	kumite 84kg
Silver medal – second place	2006 serbia	kumite 84kg
Silver medal – second place	2002 spain	Team kumite

karate West Asian Championships
Gold medal – first place	2012 Saudi Arabia	kumite 84kg

World Police Karate championships
Gold medal – first place	2005 Spain	kumite 84kg

Youth World Karate Championships
Silver medal – second place	2001 Greece	Team kumite

Maziar Elhami Varmazani (Persian: "مازیار الهامی ورمزانی"), born June 16, 1981 in Kermanshah is an Iranian karateka. He also won bronze medals in the 2002 and 2012 world karate championships and four medals in the Asian Championships.

He began karate training at age 14 with his first coach, Shahab Soltani, in the Amjadieh Karate Club in Zanjan Province.

Varmazanis participated six times in world championships from 2002 to 2012, and has the record for most appearances in the World Karate Championships. He was also the Iran karate national team's captain from 2010 to 2012.

Mixed martial arts

After transitioning from karate, he entered the world of martial arts. This year he is fighting for the New Fighting Generation Sports Belt.

== Mixed martial arts record ==
Professional record breakdown
3 matches	3 wins	0 losses
By knockout	2	0
By submission	1	0
By decision	0	0
