= Syakilla Salni =

Malaysian karateka (born 1992)

Personal information
- Full name: Syakilla Salni Jefry Krisnan
- Nationality: Malaysian
- Born: 21 June 1992 (age 34) Klang, Malaysia

Sport
- Country: Malaysia
- Sport: Karate
- Weight class: -61 kg
Medal record
Women's Karate
Representing Malaysia
Asian Games
Gold medal – first place	2014 Incheon	Kumite 61 kg

Syakilla Salni Jefry Krisnan (born 21 June 1992) is a Malaysian karateka. She was the gold medallist in the −61 kg category at the 2014 Asian Games.

== Achievements ==
Year	Competition	Venue	Rank	Event
2014	World Championships	Bremen, Germany	2nd	Kumite 61 kg
