= Tong Kit Siong =

Bruneian karateka

Tong Kit Siong 崇吉松
Medal record

Men's karate

Representing Brunei

Asian Games
Bronze medal – third place	2002 Busan	Kumite -75 kg

Southeast Asian Games
Silver medal – second place	2005 Cebu	Kumite -75 kg

Tong Kit Siong
- Simplified Chinese: 崇吉松
- Traditional Chinese: 崇吉松
Transcriptions
Standard Mandarin
- Hanyu Pinyin: Chóng Jísōng

Tong Kit Siong (Chinese: 崇吉松; pinyin: Chóng Jísōng) is a Bruneian male karateka.

At the 2002 Asian Games Siong won the bronze medal in the men's kumite under-75 kg category, topping the repechage stage ahead of fellow bronze medallist Kim Byung-chul of South Korea. This made him the first ever individual men's medallist for Brunei at the Asian Games and only the fourth medallist in the country's history. He attempted to qualify at the 2006 Asian Games, but ultimately did not compete.

He won the second international medal of his career at the 2005 Southeast Asian Games. Initially third placed, he was upgraded to the silver medal after Malaysia's runner-up Rayner Kin Sion was disqualified for doping. This gave Brunei three silver medallists in the sport, alongside HJ Johari and Sim Chung Hlang in the lower weight categories. For his efforts, Siong was awarded a US$3000 prize by Bruneian officials for excellence in sport.

== See also ==
- List of Asian Games medalists in karate
