= Karate at the 2002 Asian Games – Women's kumite +60 kg =

Karate competition

Women's kumite +60 kg at the 2002 Asian Games
- Venue: Yangsan College Gymnasium
- Date: 11 October 2002
- Competitors: 7 from 7 nations

Medalists
| gold medal | Nguyễn Trọng Bảo Ngọc | Vietnam |
| silver medal | Sofiya Kaspulatova | Uzbekistan |
| bronze medal | Natalya Solodilova | Kazakhstan |
| bronze medal | Emiko Honma | Japan |

The women's kumite +60 kilograms competition at the 2002 Asian Games in Busan was held on 11 October at the Yangsan College Gymnasium.

== Schedule ==
All times are Korea Standard Time (UTC+09:00)

| Date | Time | Event |
|---|---|---|
| Friday, 11 October 2002 | 15:30 | 1st preliminary round |
| Friday, 11 October 2002 | 15:30 | Semifinals |
| Friday, 11 October 2002 | 15:30 | Final repechage |
| Friday, 11 October 2002 | 15:30 | Final |

== Results ==
=== Main bracket ===
| 1st preliminary round | | Semifinals | | Final |
| | | Nguyễn Trọng Bảo Ngọc (VIE) | 4 |
| Natalya Solodilova (KAZ) | 4 | Natalya Solodilova (KAZ) | 1 |
| Liu Ya-li (TPE) | 2 | | | Nguyễn Trọng Bảo Ngọc (VIE) | 6 |
| Maitha Al-Maktoum (UAE) | 3 | | | Sofiya Kaspulatova (UZB) | 3 |
| Emiko Honma (JPN) | 4 | Emiko Honma (JPN) | 4 |
| Buthaina Al-Mahsiri (JOR) | 0 | Sofiya Kaspulatova (UZB) | 8 |
| Sofiya Kaspulatova (UZB) | 1 |

=== Repechage ===
Final repechage
Bye
Natalya Solodilova (KAZ)
Emiko Honma (JPN) | 5
Buthaina Al-Mahsiri (JOR) | 1
