= Barno Mirzaeva =

Uzbekistani karateka (born 1991)

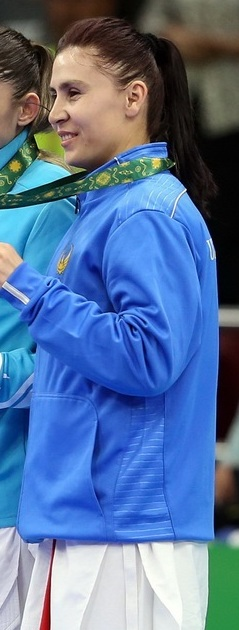
- Mirzaeva in 2017

Personal information
- Born: 23 August 1991 (age 34)

Sport
- Country: Uzbekistan
- Sport: Karate
- Weight class: 61 kg
- Event: Kumite
Medal record
Women's karate
Representing Uzbekistan
Asian Games
Silver medal – second place	2014 Incheon	Kumite 61 kg
Bronze medal – third place	2010 Guangzhou	Kumite 61 kg
Bronze medal – third place	2018 Jakarta	Kumite 61 kg
Asian Championships
Gold medal – first place	2013 Dubai	Kumite 61 kg
Bronze medal – third place	2015 Yokohama	Kumite 61 kg
Islamic Solidarity Games
Bronze medal – third place	2017 Baku	Kumite 61 kg

Barno Mirzaeva (born 23 August 1991) is an Uzbekistani karateka. In 2014, she reached the final in the women's kumite 61 kg event at the Asian Games and she won the silver medal. She is also a gold medalist at the Asian Karate Championships and a bronze medalist at the Islamic Solidarity Games.

== Career ==
In 2013, Mirzaeva won the gold medal in the women's kumite 61 kg event at the Asian Karate Championships held in Dubai, United Arab Emirates.

At the 2017 Islamic Solidarity Games held in Baku, Azerbaijan, she won one of the bronze medals in the women's kumite 61 kg event.

In 2018, Mirzaeva won one of the bronze medals in the women's kumite 61 kg event at the Asian Games held in Jakarta, Indonesia. She defeated Arm Sukkiaw of Thailand in her bronze medal match.

== Achievements ==
Year	Competition	Venue	Rank	Event
2010	Asian Games	Guangzhou, China	3rd	Kumite 61 kg
2013	Asian Championships	Dubai, United Arab Emirates	1st	Kumite 61 kg
2014	Asian Games	Incheon, South Korea	2nd	Kumite 61 kg
2015	Asian Championships	Yokohama, Japan	3rd	Kumite 61 kg
2017	Islamic Solidarity Games	Baku, Azerbaijan	3rd	Kumite 61 kg
2018	Asian Games	Jakarta, Indonesia	3rd	Kumite 61 kg
