= Karate at the 2014 Asian Games – Women's kumite 61 kg =

Karate competition

Women's kumite 61 kg at the 2014 Asian Games
- Venue: Gyeyang Gymnasium
- Date: 3 October 2014
- Competitors: 13 from 13 nations

Medalists
gold medal	Syakilla Salni	Malaysia
silver medal	Barno Mirzaeva	Uzbekistan
bronze medal	Yin Xiaoyan	China
bronze medal	Fatemeh Chalaki	Iran

The women's kumite 61 kilograms competition at the 2014 Asian Games in Incheon, South Korea was held on 3 October 2014 at the Gyeyang Gymnasium.

== Schedule ==
All times are Korea Standard Time (UTC+09:00)

Date	Time	Event
Friday, 3 October 2014	09:30	1/8 finals
Friday, 3 October 2014	09:30	Quarterfinals
Friday, 3 October 2014	09:30	Semifinals
Friday, 3 October 2014	09:30	Final of repechage
Friday, 3 October 2014	09:30	Finals

== Results ==
=== Main bracket ===
1/8 finals
Princess Sicangco (PHI)	1
Syakilla Salni (MAS)	3
Fatima Al-Shawabkeh (JOR)	0
Bùi Thị Ngọc Hân (VIE)	8
Yin Xiaoyan (CHN)	7
Zuhria Mesheinesh (PLE)	6
Fatemeh Chalaki (IRI)	3
Lee Ting Ting (HKG)	0
Shin Su-jung (KOR)	6
Madina Utelbayeva (KAZ)	3

Quarterfinals
Syakilla Salni (MAS)	2
Bùi Thị Ngọc Hân (VIE)	2
Yin Xiaoyan (CHN)	5
Mona Shheber (SYR)	0
Fatemeh Chalaki (IRI)	2
Barno Mirzaeva (UZB)	4
Shin Su-jung (KOR)	6
Chang Ting (TPE)	3

Semifinals
Syakilla Salni (MAS)	2
Yin Xiaoyan (CHN)	0
Barno Mirzaeva (UZB)	5
Shin Su-jung (KOR)	0

Final
Syakilla Salni (MAS)	10
Barno Mirzaeva (UZB)	2

=== Repechage ===
Final of repechage
Princess Sicangco (PHI)	1
Bùi Thị Ngọc Hân (VIE)	6

Bronze medal contest
Bùi Thị Ngọc Hân (VIE)	5
Yin Xiaoyan (CHN)	7
Fatemeh Chalaki (IRI)	3
Shin Su-jung (KOR)	2
