= Jasem Vishkaei =

Iranian karateka (born 1982)

Personal information
- National team: Iranian Karate national team
- Born: December 27, 1982 (age 43) Bandar-e Anzali, Iran
- Occupation: Karate coach
- Years active: 1998-2018

Sport
- Sport: Karate
Medal record
Representing Iran
Men's Karate
World Championships
Gold medal – first place	2006 Tampere	75 kg
Silver medal – second place	2002 Madrid	75 kg
Bronze medal – third place	2002 Madrid	Team
Asian Games
Gold medal – first place	2010 Guangzhou	84 kg
Gold medal – first place	2006 Doha	75 kg
Silver medal – second place	2002 Busan	75 kg
Islamic Solidarity Games
Silver medal – second place	2005 Medina	75 kg
Gold medal – first place	2005 Medina	Team
Asian Championships
Gold medal – first place	2007 Malaysia	Open
Silver medal – second place	2007 Malaysia	Team
Gold medal – first place	2005 Macau	Team
Silver medal – second place	2004 Taiwan	80kg
Silver medal – second place	2004 Taiwan	Team
Silver medal – second place	2001 Malaysia	70kg
Bronze medal – third place	2001 Malaysia	Team

Jasem Vishkaei (Persian: جاسم ويشكائى, also Romanized as "Jāsem Vishkaei"; born December 27, 1982, in Bandare Anzali, Gilan Province) is an Iranian karateka. Vishkaei competed in the 2006 Asian Games in the 75 kg division and won the gold medal. He also won the gold medal in 2010 Asian Games.

== Career ==
Jassim Vishkaei started karate in 1366 with Mr. Seyedgar in Bandar Anzali and in 1997 he became a member of the Iran national team and during his time in the Iranian national team he won 3 gold medals from the Asian Youth Championships. 3 gold, 2 silver and 1 bronze medal from the U21 World Championship, 2 gold, 2 silver and 2 bronze medal from the Asian Senior Championships. Vishkaei has also won the gold medal of the Open World Cup, gold, silver and bronze medal of the World Championships, silver medal of Busan Asian Games and gold medal of Doha and Gwangju Asian Games and more than 10 colorful medals from prestigious countries Competitions in the world.

According to many experts in this field, if karate was one of the Olympic disciplines during Jassem's sports career, he should have been awarded at least two gold medals.

Jasem Vishkaei graduated from Bandar Anzali Islamic Azad University with a master's degree in Physical education majoring in physiology.

== Personal life ==
On 8 February 2026, Vishkaei was arrested for supporting the 2025–2026 Iranian protests. The authorities had stormed his vacation home in Bandar-e Anzali to conduct the arrest, and confiscated his electronic devices in the process. Currently, there is no information concerning Vishkaei's whereabouts.

== Coaching records ==
- Sweden youth coach 2004
- Sweden U21 and seniors coach 2014–2017

== Sports achievements ==
=== National ===
Competiotion	Year	Country	Rank
AKF Cadet and Junior Championships	1998	Macau	Gold medal
AKF Cadet and Junior Championships	2000	Macau	Gold medal
World Cadet and Junior Championships	1999	Bulgaria	Gold medal
World Cadet and Junior Championships	2001	Greece	Silver medal
World Cadet and Junior Championships	2003	France	Bronze medal
World Cadet and Junior Championships	2003	France	Gold medal
Asian Games	2002	South Korea	
Asian Games	2006	Qatar	
Asian Games	2010	China	
Senior World Championships	2002	Spain	Silver medal
Senior World Championships	2002	Spain	Bronze medal
Senior World Championships	2006	Finland	Gold medal
Asian Karate Championships	2001	Malaysia	Silver medal
Asian Karate Championships	2001	Malaysia	Bronze medal
Asian Karate Championships	2004	Taiwan	Silver medal
Asian Karate Championships	2004	Taiwan	Silver medal
Asian Karate Championships	2005	Macau	Gold medal
Asian Karate Championships	2007	Malaysia	Gold medal
Asian Karate Championships	2007	Malaysia	Silver medal
West Asian Games	2002	Kuwait	Gold medal
Senior World Super Cup Competitions	2002	France	Gold medal
Karate1 Series A	2018	Austria	Bronze medal
FISU World University Championships	2010	Montenegro	Gold medal
FISU World University Championships	2010	Montenegro	Bronze medal
Islamic Solidarity Games	2005	Saudi Arabia	Silver medal
Islamic Solidarity Games	2005	Saudi Arabia	Gold medal
