= Alireza Katiraei =

Iranian karateka (born 1976)

Medal record

Men's karate

Representing Iran

World Championships
Bronze medal – third place	1998 Rio de Janeiro	Open
Bronze medal – third place	2002 Madrid	Team

World Games
Bronze medal – third place	1997 Lahti	75 kg

Asian Games
Gold medal – first place	1998 Bangkok	75 kg
Gold medal – first place	2002 Busan	70 kg

Alireza Katiraei

Alireza Katiraei, (Persian: علیرضا کتیرایی, born March 5, 1976 in Qom), is a retired professional Iranian karateka. Katiraei won gold medal in 1998 Asian Games and 2002 Asian Games.
