= Nguyễn Hoàng Ngân =

Vietnamese karateka (born 1984)

- Born: October 21, 1984 (age 42); Hanoi, Vietnam
- Nationality: Vietnamese
- Style: Suzucho Karate-do Ryu

Nguyễn Hoàng Ngân (born October 21, 1984) is a Vietnamese karateka competing in the women's kata event. She won the gold medal in the women's kata event at the 2008 World Karate Championships in Tokyo, Japan.
