= Gretchen Malalad =

Filipino karateka

- Born: January 10, 1980 (age 46); Boac, Marinduque, Philippines
- Education: University of Santo Thomas, (BA)

Gretchen Malalad (born January 10, 1980) is a Filipina athlete, beauty titleholder, and news personality. She was a 2005 Southeast Asian Games karate gold medalist and a former beauty pageant contestant in Binibining Pilipinas 2003, where she emerged as Ms. Talent and Ms. Red Bull Supreme. She is a native of Duyay, Boac, province of Marinduque. She was also a housemate in Pinoy Big Brother: Celebrity Edition 1.

== Martial arts career ==
A Karatedo black belt, Malalad won gold medals in 2001, 2003 and 2005 Southeast Asian Games, the 60 kg Individual Kumite and Open Weight Individual Kumite competitions. She, along with other karate national team members, trained in Italy under Italian world karate champion Giuseppe Romano to prepare for the 2005 SEA Games hosted by the Philippines. They met Romano in 2004, when they joined a competition he organized in Torino, Italy.

Malalad was a bronze medalist in Karate at the Asian Games in 2002 in Busan South Korea. She later won a gold medal in the 2006 Korean Grand Open Championship in Busan, Korea on November 11 and 12, 2006. Malalad won 20 Gold medals in international competitions in Asia, Europe and the US. Retiring from national duty in 2007, she was a member of the national team for eight years representing the Philippines in many international karatedo competitions. She is among the elite athletes in the country to have captured 3 gold medals in four Southeast Asian Games competitions.

== Pinoy Big Brother ==
Gretchen left the house after Big Brother allowed Gretchen to report to her superiors in the Philippine Air Force (where she serves as a first-class airwoman) to face a summary investigation about her being AWOL. Big Brother did this with the proviso that she will be blindfolded during the trip and that she cannot speak to anyone except those who were investigating her. She must also be returned to the house 24 hours after she left. She returned 14 hours later after the Philippine Air Force officially authorized her to continue her stint in the show. Then she was later evicted on Day 39.

== Education and sports career ==
Malalad holds a MS from the Columbia Graduate School of Journalism in the city of New York class of 2014. She graduated from University of Santo Tomas with a degree of Bachelor of Arts in Communication Arts.

In 2004, Malalad worked as a courtside reporter for ABC Sports' (now One Sports') coverage of the PBA games. Prior to that, she worked in the Philippine Basketball League as an in-house courtside reporter for a brief period.

Malalad was voted as Philippine Karate Federation by more than 230 clubs and associations from all over the country during elections at the Fisher Mall in Quezon City on February 17, 2019.

== Recent ventures ==
Malalad became a fitness teacher in ABS-CBN's Pinoy Dream Academy. She was a field reporter for ABS-CBN News and Current Affairs from 2006 to 2013, and then field reporter for MBC Media Group since 2015. She currently works as a freelance journalist in the Philippines, collaborating regularly with Agence France-Presse, Al Jazeera and CGTN.

== Personal life ==
Malalad, an animal rights advocate filed a case with the Barangay Hall captain of Barangay 189 in Tondo, Manila. She alleged that "her helper Cristy Radoc entered the cage of her 30 adopted cats while holding a mug containing muriatic acid and she secretly poured it into the pets' drinking bowl causing some of them to suffer from eye irritation." Earlier, she rescued abandoned cats at Dasmariñas, Makati. In collaboration with Pawssion Project Rescues PH-CARA Welfare Philippine, she protested the Village's administrative order not to feed the pets, invoking Republic Ac No. 8485 "The Animal Welfare Act of 1998."

Malalad wed her longtime partner, French businessman Jean-Marc Hauducoeur in Boracay on January 24, 2024.

== See also ==
- Karatedo at the 2005 Southeast Asian Games
