= Puvaneswaran Ramasamy =

Malaysian karateka (born 1974)

- Born: December 8, 1974 (age 51); Kuala Lumpur, Malaysia
- Style: Karate

Puvaneswaran Ramasamy (born December 8, 1974) is a Malaysian karateka who is best known for being the only person to win medals in Karate at the Asian Games at five consecutive tournaments.

== Honour ==
=== Honour of Malaysia ===
- Malaysia
  - Member of the Order of the Defender of the Realm (A.M.N.) (2003)
