= Atsuko Wakai =

Japanese karateka (born 1971)

- 若井 敦子
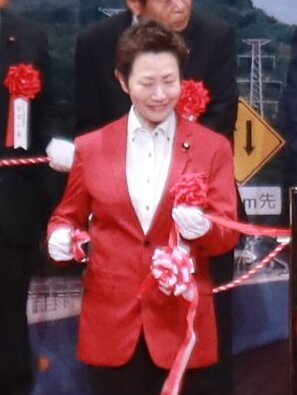
- Wakai in 2025

Member of the House of Councillors
- Incumbent
- Assumed office 29 July 2025
- Preceded by: Yasutada Ōno
- Constituency: Gifu at-large

Member of the Gifu Prefectural Assembly
- In office 12 April 2015 – 19 July 2025
- Constituency: Gifu City

Personal details
- Born: Akio Ishii; 12 September 1971 (age 55) Gifu City, Gifu, Japan
- Party: Liberal Democratic
- Education: Kindai University
- Occupation: Karate athlete • Politician

Medal record

Women's karate

Representing Japan

World Games
Gold medal – first place	1997 Lahti	Kata individual
Gold medal – first place	2001 Akita	Kata individual
Gold medal – first place	2005 Duisburg	Kata individual

Karate World Championships
Gold medal – first place	1998 Rio de Janeiro	Kata individual
Gold medal – first place	2000 Munich	Kata individual
Gold medal – first place	2002 Madrid	Kata individual
Gold medal – first place	2004 Monterrey	Kata individual

Asian Games
Gold medal – first place	1998 Bangkok	Kata individual
Gold medal – first place	2002 Busan	Kata individual

Atsuko Wakai (若井 敦子, Wakai Atsuko; born September 12, 1971) is a Japanese practitioner of karate who has won many international and Japanese national competitions in kata (patterns), including unprecedented numbers of consecutive titles in World Karate Federation (WKF) and All Japan Karatedo championships. She holds the rank of 6th dan black belt from the Japan Karatedo Federation (JKF), training in Seigokan Goju-ryu karate.

== Early life ==
Wakai was born on September 12, 1971, in Gifu, Japan. When she was 4 years old, she was involved in an automobile accident; the severe head injuries forced her to recover in hospital for four months. When she had turned 6 years old, her parents enrolled her at the Goju-ryu karate dojo (training hall) Chusetsu Gifu of Seigokan, under the leadership of Yasufumi Ohno Shihan (8th Dan) to help her regain strength and coordination.

Wakai graduated from Kyomachi Elementary School in 1984, Inaba Junior High School in 1987, and Gifu Dai-Ichi Girls' Senior High School in 1990. She then studied business for two years at Kinki University, graduating in 1992. While she had competed in karate locally, it was while at university that she began competing intensively. Originally, she competed in both kata and kumite (sparring), but after taking a third place in kata at an All Japan tournament, she focused on that aspect of competition.

== Competitive karate career ==
Unusually, Wakai did not make it onto the Japanese national karate squad until after she graduated from university—the time when most Japanese karate competitors retire from competition to focus on their professional careers. Wakai has identified Suzuko Hamasaki (née Okamura) as her main inspiration. In an interview in 2000, she said, "Suzuko Hamasaki is someone I really admire! She was the first Women's World Kata Champion in 1980. The first time I saw her, I wanted to be just like her." Wakai has been coached by Akira Shiomi, JKF Gojukai Chief Technical Director, and also Yoshimi Inoue at one point.

Wakai's first international victory was at the 2nd Ladies' International Karate Cup in 1997, held in Tokyo. From 1997 to 2004, she was a champion at the All Japan Karatedo Championships for eight consecutive years. She won four consecutive WKF World Karate Championships in 1998, 2000, 2002, and 2004. She won three consecutive World Games championships in women's kata in 1997, 2001, and 2005. Wakai also won titles at the Asian Games in 1998 and 2002. In 2000, she was listed at 163 cm (5 ft 4 in) in height and 57 kg (126 lb) in weight. She won the women's individual kata gold medal at the 6th World Games in Akita, Japan, in 2001.

== Post-competition career ==
Following her victory in kata at the World Games in 2005, Wakai retired from karate competition. That same year, she received an Honor of Merit and Distinguished Service from the Japanese Ministry of Education, Culture, Sports, Science, and Technology. In 2006, she received an Award of Excellence from the Japanese Olympic Committee. In 2007, she became Director of the Seino Transportation Company's karate team. She visited British Columbia to teach in March 2007 and October 2008. She taught in Hawaii in December 2008 and in Florida in June 2009.

== See also ==
- Keiko Fukuda
