= Ryosuke Shimizu =

Japanese karateka

- Born: 18 January 1980 (age 46); Kyoto, Japan
- Style: Shotokan Karate
- Teacher: Masaaki Ueki
- Rank: 5th Dan karate (JKA)

Ryosuke Shimizu (Shimizu Ryosuke; born 18 January 1980) is a Japanese instructor of Shotokan karate. He has won the JKA All-Japan championships for kumite on 2 occasions. He is currently an instructor of the Japan Karate Association.

== Biography ==
Shimizu was born in Kyoto, Japan. He studied at Kyoto Industrial University. His karate training began during his 1st year of elementary school.

== Competition ==
Shimizu has had considerable success in karate competitions.

=== Major tournament successes ===
- 54th JKA All Japan Karate Championship (2011) – 3rd Place Kumite
- 53rd JKA All Japan Karate Championship (2010) – 2nd Place Kumite
- 52nd JKA All Japan Karate Championship (2009) – 3rd Place Kumite
- 51st JKA All Japan Karate Championship (2008) – 1st Place Kumite
- 49th JKA All Japan Karate Championship (2006) – 1st Place Kumite
- 48th JKA All Japan Karate Championship (2005) – 2nd Place Kumite
- 44th JKA All Japan Karate Championship (2001) – 3rd Place Kumite
