= Dongwon Institute of Science and Technology =

Coordinates: 35°20′39″N 129°04′05″E

- Hangul: 동원과학기술대학교
- Hanja: 東園科學技術大學校
- RR: Dongwon gwahak gisul daehakgyo
- MR: Tongwŏn kwahak kisul taehakkyo

Dongwon Institute of Science and Technology is a private college located in Yangsan City, South Gyeongsang province, South Korea. It was called Yangsan College until August 2013.

== See also ==
- List of colleges and universities in South Korea
