= Chan Ka Man =

Hong Kong karateka (born 1971)

Medal record

Women's Karate

Asian Games
Bronze medal – third place	2006 Doha	Kumite -60 kg

Chan Ma Kan (Chinese: 陳枷彣; Jyutping: can^{4} gaa^{1} man^{4}; born 6 March 1971) is a karateka from Hong Kong, China who won a bronze medal at the 2006 Asian Games in the women's kumite -60 kg class.
