= Karate at the 2014 Asian Games =

Karate competition

- Venue: Gyeyang Gymnasium
- Dates: 2–4 October 2014
- Competitors: 172 from 32 nations

Karate at the 2014 Asian Games was held in Gyeyang Gymnasium, Incheon, South Korea between October 2 and 4, 2014.

== Schedule ==
P	Preliminary rounds & Repechage	F	Finals

Event↓/Date →	2nd Thu		3rd Fri		4th Sat	
Men's kata	P	F				
Men's kumite 55 kg			P	F		
Men's kumite 60 kg			P	F		
Men's kumite 67 kg	P	F				
Men's kumite 75 kg	P	F				
Men's kumite 84 kg					P	F
Men's kumite +84 kg					P	F
Women's kata	P	F				
Women's kumite 50 kg					P	F
Women's kumite 55 kg			P	F		
Women's kumite 61 kg			P	F		
Women's kumite 68 kg			P	F		
Women's kumite +68 kg	P	F				

== Medalists ==
=== Men ===
Event	Gold	Silver	Bronze
Kata	Lim Chee Wei; Malaysia	Fidelys Lolobua; Indonesia	Issei Shimbaba; Japan
Kata	Lim Chee Wei; Malaysia	Fidelys Lolobua; Indonesia	Marwan Al-Maazmi; United Arab Emirates
Kumite −55 kg	Andrey Aktauov; Kazakhstan	Abdullah Al-Harbi; Saudi Arabia	Sun Jingchao; China
Kumite −55 kg	Andrey Aktauov; Kazakhstan	Abdullah Al-Harbi; Saudi Arabia	Senthil Kumaran Silvarajoo; Malaysia
Kumite −60 kg	Amir Mehdizadeh; Iran	Abdelrahman Al-Masatfa; Jordan	Nguyễn Thanh Duy; Vietnam
Kumite −60 kg	Amir Mehdizadeh; Iran	Abdelrahman Al-Masatfa; Jordan	Lee Ji-hwan; South Korea
Kumite −67 kg	Hiroto Shinohara; Japan	Rinat Sagandykov; Kazakhstan	Kim Do-won; South Korea
Kumite −67 kg	Hiroto Shinohara; Japan	Rinat Sagandykov; Kazakhstan	Ali Al-Shatti; Kuwait
Kumite −75 kg	Saeid Hassanipour; Iran	Lee Ka Wai; Hong Kong	Gofurjon Zokhidov; Uzbekistan
Kumite −75 kg	Saeid Hassanipour; Iran	Lee Ka Wai; Hong Kong	Songvut Muntaen; Thailand
Kumite −84 kg	Ryutaro Araga; Japan	Hamad Al-Nweam; Kuwait	Jang Min-soo; South Korea
Kumite −84 kg	Ryutaro Araga; Japan	Hamad Al-Nweam; Kuwait	Shakhboz Akhatov; Uzbekistan
Kumite +84 kg	Rashed Al-Mutairi; Kuwait	Hideyoshi Kagawa; Japan	Sengpheng Duangvilai; Laos
Kumite +84 kg	Rashed Al-Mutairi; Kuwait	Hideyoshi Kagawa; Japan	Khalid Khalidov; Kazakhstan

=== Women ===
Event	Gold	Silver	Bronze
Kata	Kiyou Shimizu; Japan	Nguyễn Hoàng Ngân; Vietnam	Bimala Tamang; Nepal
Kata	Kiyou Shimizu; Japan	Nguyễn Hoàng Ngân; Vietnam	Cheung Pui Si; Macau
Kumite −50 kg	Ku Tsui-ping; Chinese Taipei	Yekaterina Khupovets; Kazakhstan	Jang So-young; South Korea
Kumite −50 kg	Ku Tsui-ping; Chinese Taipei	Yekaterina Khupovets; Kazakhstan	Nasrin Dousti; Iran
Kumite −55 kg	Wen Tzu-yun; Chinese Taipei	Sabina Zakharova; Kazakhstan	Mae Soriano; Philippines
Kumite −55 kg	Wen Tzu-yun; Chinese Taipei	Sabina Zakharova; Kazakhstan	Miki Kobayashi; Japan
Kumite −61 kg	Syakilla Salni; Malaysia	Barno Mirzaeva; Uzbekistan	Yin Xiaoyan; China
Kumite −61 kg	Syakilla Salni; Malaysia	Barno Mirzaeva; Uzbekistan	Fatemeh Chalaki; Iran
Kumite −68 kg	Guzaliya Gafurova; Kazakhstan	Tang Lingling; China	Chao Jou; Chinese Taipei
Kumite −68 kg	Guzaliya Gafurova; Kazakhstan	Tang Lingling; China	Shree Sharmini Segaran; Malaysia
Kumite +68 kg	Hamideh Abbasali; Iran	Zeng Cuilan; China	Ayumi Uekusa; Japan
Kumite +68 kg	Hamideh Abbasali; Iran	Zeng Cuilan; China	Paula Carion; Macau

== Medal table ==
Rank	Nation	Gold	Silver	Bronze	Total
1	Japan (JPN)	3	1	3	7
2	Iran (IRI)	3	0	2	5
3	Kazakhstan (KAZ)	2	3	1	6
4	Malaysia (MAS)	2	0	2	4
5	Chinese Taipei (TPE)	2	0	1	3
6	Kuwait (KUW)	1	1	1	3
7	China (CHN)	0	2	2	4
8	Uzbekistan (UZB)	0	1	2	3
9	Vietnam (VIE)	0	1	1	2
10	Hong Kong (HKG)	0	1	0	1
10	Indonesia (INA)	0	1	0	1
10	Jordan (JOR)	0	1	0	1
10	Saudi Arabia (KSA)	0	1	0	1
14	South Korea (KOR)	0	0	4	4
15	Macau (MAC)	0	0	2	2
16	Laos (LAO)	0	0	1	1
16	Nepal (NEP)	0	0	1	1
16	Philippines (PHI)	0	0	1	1
16	Thailand (THA)	0	0	1	1
16	United Arab Emirates (UAE)	0	0	1	1
Totals (20 entries)		13	13	26	52

== Participating nations ==
A total of 172 athletes from 32 nations competed in karate at the 2014 Asian Games:

- Bangladesh (2)
- Brunei (2)
- China (8)
- Chinese Taipei (8)
- Hong Kong (8)
- Indonesia (8)
- Iran (8)
- Japan (8)
- Jordan (7)
- Kazakhstan (8)
- Kuwait (4)
- Kyrgyzstan (7)
- Laos (2)
- Macau (8)
- Malaysia (6)
- Nepal (8)
- North Korea (5)
- Pakistan (6)
- Palestine (2)
- Philippines (6)
- Qatar (4)
- Saudi Arabia (4)
- South Korea (8)
- Syria (2)
- Tajikistan (1)
- Thailand (5)
- Timor-Leste (2)
- Turkmenistan (4)
- United Arab Emirates (3)
- Uzbekistan (8)
- Vietnam (8)
- Yemen (2)
