= Uzbekistan at the 2022 World Games =

- IOC code: UZB
- NOC: National Olympic Committee of the Republic of Uzbekistan

in Birmingham, United States 7 July 2022 – 17 July 2022
- Competitors: 5 (3 men and 2 women) in 5 sports and 8 events
- Medals Ranked 60th: Gold 0 Silver 1 Bronze 1 Total 2

World Games appearances
- 1981; 1985; 1989; 1993; 1997; 2001; 2005; 2009; 2013; 2017; 2022; 2025

Uzbekistan competed at the 2022 World Games held in Birmingham, United States from 7 to 17 July 2022. Athletes representing Uzbekistan won one silver medal and one bronze medal. The country finished in 60th place in the medal table.

== Medalists ==
Medal	Name	Sport	Event	Date
Bronze	Dastonbek Otabolaev	Karate	Men's kumite 75 kg	9 July

=== Invitational sports ===
Medal	Name	Sport	Event	Date
Silver	Darya Latisheva	Wushu	Women's nanquan & nandao	13 July

== Competitors ==
The following is the list of number of competitors in the Games.

Sport	Men	Women	Total
Ju-jitsu	1	0	1
Karate	1	0	1
Muaythai	1	0	1
Rhythmic gymnastics	—N/a	1	1
Wushu	0	1	1
Total	3	2	5

== Ju-jitsu ==
One competitor was scheduled to represent Uzbekistan in ju-jitsu.

Athlete	Category	Group stage			Semifinals	Final/Bronze medal bout	
Athlete	Category	Opposition Result	Opposition Result	Rank	Opposition Result	Opposition Result	Rank
Bakhromjon Mashrapov	Fighting 77 kg	Attenberger (GER); L WO	Ochoa (MEX); L WO	3	Did not advance		

== Karate ==
Uzbekistan won one bronze medal in karate.

Athlete	Event	Elimination round				Semifinal	Final / BM	
Athlete	Event	Opposition Result	Opposition Result	Opposition Result	Rank	Opposition Result	Opposition Result	Rank
Dastonbek Otabolaev	Men's kumite 75 kg	Scott (USA); D 1–1	Hsu (TPE); D 1–1	Hárspataki (HUN); W 2–2	2 Q	Horuna (UKR); L 0–8	Scott (USA); W 2–1	3rd place, bronze medalist(s)

== Muaythai ==
Uzbekistan competed in muaythai.

Athlete	Category	Quarterfinals	Semifinals	Final/Bronze medal bout	
Athlete	Category	Opposition Result	Opposition Result	Opposition Result	Rank
Fanat Kakhramonov	91 kg	Pryimachov (UKR); L KO–B	Did not advance		

== Rhythmic gymnastics ==
Uzbekistan competed in rhythmic gymnastics.

Athlete	Event	Qualification		Final	
Athlete	Event	Score	Rank	Score	Rank
Ekaterina Fetisova	Ball	29.650	10	Did not advance	
Ekaterina Fetisova	Clubs	28.200	17	Did not advance	
Ekaterina Fetisova	Hoop	28.900	16	Did not advance	
Ekaterina Fetisova	Ribbon	28.150	12	Did not advance	

== Wushu ==
Uzbekistan won one silver medal in wushu.

Athlete	Event	First routine		Second routine		Final score	
Athlete	Event	Result	Rank	Result	Rank	Result	Rank
Darya Latisheva	Women's nanquan and nandao	9.293	2	9.423	2	18.716	2nd place, silver medalist(s)
