= Karate at the 2010 Asian Games – Men's kumite 67 kg =

Men's kumite 67 kg at the 2010 Asian Games
- Venue: Guangdong Gymnasium
- Date: 25 November 2010
- Competitors: 27 from 27 nations

Medalists
gold medal	Rinat Sagandykov	Kazakhstan
silver medal	Abdullah Al-Otaibi	Athletes from Kuwait
bronze medal	Fahad Al-Khathami	Saudi Arabia
bronze medal	Lee Ji-hwan	South Korea

The men's kumite 67 kilograms competition at the 2010 Asian Games in Guangzhou, China, was held on 25 November 2010 at the Guangdong Gymnasium.

== Schedule ==
All times are China Standard Time (UTC+08:00)

Date	Time	Event
Thursday, 25 November 2010	14:00	1/16 finals
Thursday, 25 November 2010	14:00	1/8 finals
Thursday, 25 November 2010	14:00	Quarterfinals
Thursday, 25 November 2010	14:00	Semifinals
Thursday, 25 November 2010	14:00	Repechage 1
Thursday, 25 November 2010	14:00	Repechage 2
Thursday, 25 November 2010	14:00	Bronze medal match
Thursday, 25 November 2010	14:00	Final

== Results ==
Legend

- H — Won by hansoku
- K — Won by kiken

=== Main bracket ===
==== Final ====
Final
Rinat Sagandykov (KAZ)	2
Abdullah Al-Otaibi (IOC)	1

==== Top half ====
1/16 finals
Karem Othman (SYR)	1
Bakyt Duisheev (KGZ)	0
Fahad Al-Khathami (KSA)	1
Nguyễn Ngọc Thành (VIE)	0
Kushal Shrestha (NEP)	8
Inkhathep Saythansavanh (LAO)	2
Yuen Siu Lun (HKG)	1
Sufian Al-Malayeen (JOR)	1
Rinat Sagandykov (KAZ)	1
Mukhammadzaid Iminov (UZB)	0

1/8 finals
Mohd Fadillah Hj Sanif (BRU)	1
Karem Othman (SYR)	2
Fahad Al-Khathami (KSA)	1
Kushal Shrestha (NEP)	0
Rolando Lagman (PHI)	0
Sufian Al-Malayeen (JOR)	3
Rinat Sagandykov (KAZ)	6
Kang Song-ji (PRK)	2

Quarterfinals
Karem Othman (SYR)	2
Fahad Al-Khathami (KSA)	2
Sufian Al-Malayeen (JOR)	1
Rinat Sagandykov (KAZ)	1

Semifinals
Fahad Al-Khathami (KSA)	3
Rinat Sagandykov (KAZ)	5

==== Bottom half ====
1/16 finals
Woraphol Kueapol (THA)	4
Sabari Karthik (IND)	1
Shinji Nagaki (JPN)	1
Lim Yoke Wai (MAS)	0
Saadi Abbas Jalbani (PAK)	4
Pang Iat Long (MAC)	8
Rahmatullah Hassani (AFG)	0
Li Haojie (CHN)	4
Abdulaziz Dalloul (QAT)	2
Rayappan Jebamalai Edward (SRI)	0
Lee Ji-hwan (KOR)	2
Yasir Issam (IRQ)	0

1/8 finals
Abdullah Al-Otaibi (IOC)	3
Woraphol Kueapol (THA)	1
Shinji Nagaki (JPN)	7
Pang Iat Long (MAC)	5
Li Haojie (CHN)	4
Abdulaziz Dalloul (QAT)	1^{H}
Lee Ji-hwan (KOR)	3
Jintar Simanjuntak (INA)	2

Quarterfinals
Abdullah Al-Otaibi (IOC)	3
Shinji Nagaki (JPN)	1
Abdulaziz Dalloul (QAT)
Lee Ji-hwan (KOR)	K

Semifinals
Abdullah Al-Otaibi (IOC)	7
Lee Ji-hwan (KOR)	4

=== Repechage ===
Repechage 1
Mukhammadzaid Iminov (UZB)
Kang Song-ji (PRK)	K

Repechage 2
Kang Song-ji (PRK)	0
Sufian Al-Malayeen (JOR)	2
Woraphol Kueapol (THA)	0
Shinji Nagaki (JPN)	8

Bronze medal match
Sufian Al-Malayeen (JOR)	1
Fahad Al-Khathami (KSA)	3
Shinji Nagaki (JPN)	0
Lee Ji-Hwan (KOR)	4
