= Karate at the 2022 Asian Games – Men's kumite 75 kg =

Men's kumite 75 kg at the 2022 Asian Games
- Venue: Linping Sports Centre Gymnasium
- Date: 5 October 2023
- Competitors: 19 from 19 nations

Medalists
gold medal	Nurkanat Azhikanov	Kazakhstan
silver medal	Hasan Masarweh	Jordan
bronze medal	Nazim Nurlanov	Kyrgyzstan
bronze medal	Ignatius Joshua Kandou	Indonesia

The men's kumite 75 kilograms competition at the 2022 Asian Games took place on 5 October 2023 at Linping Sports Centre Gymnasium, Hangzhou.

== Schedule ==
All times are China Standard Time (UTC+08:00)

Date	Time	Event
Thursday, 5 October 2023	08:30	Round of 32
Thursday, 5 October 2023	08:30	Round of 16
Thursday, 5 October 2023	08:30	Quarterfinals
Thursday, 5 October 2023	08:30	Semifinals
Thursday, 5 October 2023	08:30	Repechages
Thursday, 5 October 2023	14:00	Finals

== Results ==
=== Main bracket ===
==== Final ====
Gold medal contest
Nurkanat Azhikanov (KAZ)	8
Hasan Masarweh (JOR)	0

==== Top half ====
Round of 32
Sot Phanith (CAM)	4
Jacob Manuel (TLS)	0

Round of 16
Nazim Nurlanov (KGZ)	3
Sot Phanith (CAM)	0
Mahammed Shekhu Alam (NEP)	0
Nurkanat Azhikanov (KAZ)	5
Anas Bsharat (PLE)	0
Sultan Al-Zahrani (KSA)	4
Sharmendran Raghonathan (MAS)	4
Dawut Nazmyradow (TKM)	2

Quarterfinals
Nazim Nurlanov (KGZ)	1
Nurkanat Azhikanov (KAZ)	3
Sultan Al-Zahrani (KSA)	2
Sharmendran Raghonathan (MAS)	5

Semifinals
Nurkanat Azhikanov (KAZ)	4
Sharmendran Raghonathan (MAS)	3

==== Bottom half ====
Round of 32
Alwyn Batican (PHI)	5
Leong On Tek (MAC)	0
Kuvonchbek Mukhammadiev (UZB)	0
Bahman Asgari (IRI)	6

Round of 16
Hasan Masarweh (JOR)	7
Alwyn Batican (PHI)	3
Ignatius Joshua Kandou (INA)	6
Omar Al-Jenaei (KUW)	3
Yusei Sakiyama (JPN)	4
Pan Po-shen (TPE)	1
Bahman Asgari (IRI)	4
Pi Jae-yoon (KOR)	2

Quarterfinals
Hasan Masarweh (JOR)	6
Ignatius Joshua Kandou (INA)	4
Yusei Sakiyama (JPN)	3
Bahman Asgari (IRI)	1

Semifinals
Hasan Masarweh (JOR)	5
Yusei Sakiyama (JPN)	5

=== Repechage ===
Repechage round 2
Mahammed Shekhu Alam (NEP)	0
Nazim Nurlanov (KGZ)	2
Alwyn Batican (PHI)	3
Ignatius Joshua Kandou (INA)	5

Bronze medal bouts
Nazim Nurlanov (KGZ)	8
Sharmendran Raghonathan (MAS)	0
Ignatius Joshua Kandou (INA)	4
Yusei Sakiyama (JPN)	0
