= Karate at the 2006 Asian Games – Men's kumite 65 kg =

Karate competition

Men's kumite 65 kg at the 2006 Asian Games
- Venue: Qatar SC Indoor Hall
- Date: 13 December 2006
- Competitors: 22 from 22 nations

Medalists
gold medal	Hassan Rouhani	Iran
silver medal	Shion Kayahara	Japan
bronze medal	Lim Yoke Wai	Malaysia
bronze medal	Magid Adwan	Qatar

The men's kumite 65 kilograms competition at the 2006 Asian Games in Doha, Qatar was held on 13 December 2006 at the Qatar SC Indoor Hall.

== Schedule ==
All times are Arabia Standard Time (UTC+03:00)

Date	Time	Event
Wednesday, 13 December 2006	13:00	1/16 finals
Wednesday, 13 December 2006	13:00	1/8 finals
Wednesday, 13 December 2006	13:00	Quarterfinals
Wednesday, 13 December 2006	13:00	Semifinals
Wednesday, 13 December 2006	13:00	Repechage 1R
Wednesday, 13 December 2006	13:00	Repechage 2R
Wednesday, 13 December 2006	13:00	Finals

== Results ==
Legend

- K — Won by kiken (8–0)

=== Main bracket ===
==== Final ====
Final
Hassan Rouhani (IRI)	8
Shion Kayahara (JPN)	7

==== Top half ====
1/16 finals
Lim Yoke Wai (MAS)	3
Meshal Al-Handal (KUW)	2
Fadi Al-Najjar (JOR)	4
Ali Jawad (LIB)	0
Ahmad Hasaballah (SYR)	3
Hassan Rouhani (IRI)	6

1/8 finals
Nelson Pacalso (PHI)	K
Mohammed Abo-Baker (YEM)
Lim Yoke Wai (MAS)	3
Ali Al-Shamrani (KSA)	1
Kushal Shrestha (NEP)	1
Fadi Al-Najjar (JOR)	9
Hassan Rouhani (IRI)	5
Rinat Kutuev (UZB)	4

Quarterfinals
Nelson Pacalso (PHI)	1
Lim Yoke Wai (MAS)	7
Fadi Al-Najjar (JOR)	0
Hassan Rouhani (IRI)	3

Semifinals
Lim Yoke Wai (MAS)	2
Hassan Rouhani (IRI)	2

==== Bottom half ====
1/16 finals
Enkhbatyn Enkhjin (MGL)	0
Shion Kayahara (JPN)	8
Rinat Sagandykov (KAZ)	5
Magid Adwan (QAT)	6
Võ Mạnh Tuấn (VIE)	9
Mateus Andrade (TLS)	1

1/8 finals
Rahmatullah Hassani (AFG)
Shion Kayahara (JPN)	K
Magid Adwan (QAT)	9
Donny Dharmawan (INA)	8
Rayappan Jebamalai Edward (SRI)	0
Võ Mạnh Tuấn (VIE)	4
Pang Iat Long (MAC)	11
Ryo Su-yong (PRK)	8

Quarterfinals
Shion Kayahara (JPN)	4
Magid Adwan (QAT)	3
Võ Mạnh Tuấn (VIE)	3
Pang Iat Long (MAC)	2

Semifinals
Shion Kayahara (JPN)	9
Võ Mạnh Tuấn (VIE)	1

=== Repechage ===
Repechage 1R
Ahmad Hasaballah (SYR)	5
Rinat Kutuev (UZB)	5
Rahmatullah Hassani (AFG)
Enkhbatyn Enkhjin (MGL)	K

Repechage 2R
Fadi Al-Najjar (JOR)	0
Rinat Kutuev (UZB)	2
Enkhbatyn Enkhjin (MGL)	1
Magid Adwan (QAT)	9

Final repechage
Lim Yoke Wai (MAS)	5
Rinat Kutuev (UZB)	1
Magid Adwan (QAT)	5
Võ Mạnh Tuấn (VIE)	1
