= Karate at the 2022 Asian Games – Women's kumite 68 kg =

Women's kumite 68 kg at the 2022 Asian Games
- Venue: Linping Sports Centre Gymnasium
- Date: 5 October 2023
- Competitors: 13 from 13 nations

Medalists
gold medal	Li Qiaoqiao	China
silver medal	Laura Alikul	Kazakhstan
bronze medal	Đinh Thị Hươnga	Vietnam
bronze medal	Hala Al-Qadi	Palestine

The women's kumite 68 kilograms competition at the 2022 Asian Games took place on 5 October 2023 at Linping Sports Centre Gymnasium, Hangzhou.

== Schedule ==
All times are China Standard Time (UTC+08:00)

Date	Time	Event
Thursday, 5 October 2023	14:00	Round of 16
Thursday, 5 October 2023	14:00	Quarterfinals
Thursday, 5 October 2023	14:00	Semifinals
Thursday, 5 October 2023	14:00	Repechages
Thursday, 5 October 2023	14:00	Finals

== Results ==
=== Main bracket ===
Round of 16
Nourallah Naser (JOR)	1
Đinh Thị Hương (VIE)	2
Mobina Heidari (IRI)	4
Ceyco Georgia Zefanya (INA)	5
Fatma Khasaif (UAE)	0
Tsubasa Kama (JPN)	0
Li Qiaoqiao (CHN)	5
Fakhr-un-Nisa (PAK)	0
Kewalin Songklin (THA)	3
Bonu Egamberdieva (UZB)	3

Quarterfinals
Laura Alikul (KAZ)	7
Đinh Thị Hương (VIE)	4
Ceyco Georgia Zefanya (INA)	4
Tsubasa Kama (JPN)	2
Chao Jou (TPE)	0
Li Qiaoqiao (CHN)	3
Bonu Egamberdieva (UZB)	7
Hala Al-Qadi (PLE)	8

Semifinals
Laura Alikul (KAZ)	5
Ceyco Georgia Zefanya (INA)	1
Li Qiaoqiao (CHN)	9
Hala Al-Qadi (PLE)	0

Gold medal contest
Laura Alikul (KAZ)	0
Li Qiaoqiao (CHN)	4

=== Repechage ===
Repechage round 1
Fakhr-un-Nisa (PAK)	2
Chao Jou (TPE)	3

Bronze medal bouts
Đinh Thị Hương (VIE)	1
Ceyco Georgia Zefanya (INA)	0
Chao Jou (TPE)	3
Hala Al-Qadi (PLE)	6
