= Ku Tsui-ping =

Taiwanese karateka

Sport
- Country: Taiwan
- Sport: Karate
- Weight class: 55 kg; 61 kg
- Events: Kumite; Team kumite
Medal record
Women's karate
Representing Chinese Taipei
Asian Games
| Gold medal – first place | 2014 Incheon | Kumite 50 kg |
| Silver medal – second place | 2022 Hangzhou | Kumite 55 kg |
Asian Championships
| Gold medal – first place | 2023 Malacca | Kumite 55 kg |
| Silver medal – second place | 2017 Astana | Team kumite |
| Silver medal – second place | 2021 Almaty | Kumite 55 kg |
| Bronze medal – third place | 2023 Malacca | Team kumite |

Ku Tsui-ping is a Taiwanese karateka. She won the gold medal in the women's kumite 50 kg event at the 2014 Asian Games held in Incheon, South Korea.

== Career ==
She won one of the bronze medals in the women's 50 kg event at the 2016 World University Karate Championships held in Braga, Portugal. She also won the silver medal in the women's team kumite event.

At the 2017 Asian Karate Championships held in Astana, Kazakhstan, she won the silver medal in the women's team kumite event, alongside Chao Jou, Gu Shiau-shuang and Wen Tzu-yun.

In June 2021, she competed at the World Olympic Qualification Tournament held in Paris, France hoping to qualify for the 2020 Summer Olympics in Tokyo, Japan. In November 2021, she competed in the women's 61 kg event at the World Karate Championships held in Dubai, United Arab Emirates. In December 2021, she won the silver medal in her event at the Asian Karate Championships held in Almaty, Kazakhstan.

In July 2023, she won the gold medal in her event at the Asian Karate Championships held in Malacca, Malaysia. She also won one of the bronze medals in the women's team kumite event. In October 2023, she won the silver medal in the women's 55 kg event at the 2022 Asian Games held in Hangzhou, China. In the same month, she competed in the women's 55 kg event at the 2023 World Karate Championships held in Budapest, Hungary.

== Achievements ==
| Year | Competition | Venue | Rank | Event |
|---|---|---|---|---|
| 2014 | Asian Games | Incheon, South Korea | 1st | Kumite 50 kg |
| 2017 | Asian Championships | Astana, Kazakhstan | 2nd | Team kumite |
| 2021 | Asian Championships | Almaty, Kazakhstan | 2nd | Kumite 55 kg |
| 2023 | Asian Championships | Malacca, Malaysia | 1st | Kumite 55 kg |
| 2023 | Asian Championships | Malacca, Malaysia | 3rd | Team kumite |
| 2023 | Asian Games | Hangzhou, China | 2nd | Kumite 55 kg |
