= Uzbekistan at the 2017 World Games =

Uzbekistan at the World Games 2017
- IOC code: UZB
- NOC: National Olympic Committee of the Republic of Uzbekistan

in Wrocław, Poland 20 July 2017 – 30 July 2017
- Competitors: 4 in 2 sports

World Games appearances
- 1981; 1985; 1989; 1993; 1997; 2001; 2005; 2009; 2013; 2017; 2022; 2025

Uzbekistan competed at the World Games 2017 in Wrocław, Poland, from 20 July 2017 to 30 July 2017.

== Competitors ==
Sports	Men	Women	Total	Events
Rhythmic gymnastics	0	1	1	1
Trampoline	1	2	3	2
Total	1	3	4	3

== Gymnastics ==
=== Rhythmic gymnastics ===
Uzbekistan has qualified at the 2017 World Games for:

- Women's individual event - 1 quota

=== Trampoline ===
Belarus has qualified at the 2017 World Games:

- Men's Individual Tumbling - 1 quota
- Women's Synchronized Trampoline - 1 quota
