= Karate at the 2014 Asian Games – Women's kumite 50 kg =

Karate competition

Women's kumite 50 kg at the 2014 Asian Games
- Venue: Gyeyang Gymnasium
- Date: 4 October 2014
- Competitors: 17 from 17 nations

Medalists
gold medal	Ku Tsui-ping	Chinese Taipei
silver medal	Yekaterina Khupovets	Kazakhstan
bronze medal	Jang So-young	South Korea
bronze medal	Nasrin Dousti	Iran

The women's kumite 50 kilograms competition at the 2014 Asian Games in Incheon, South Korea was held on 4 October 2014 at the Gyeyang Gymnasium.

== Schedule ==
All times are Korea Standard Time (UTC+09:00)

Date	Time	Event
Saturday, 4 October 2014	09:30	1/16 finals
Saturday, 4 October 2014	09:30	1/8 finals
Saturday, 4 October 2014	09:30	Quarterfinals
Saturday, 4 October 2014	09:30	Semifinals
Saturday, 4 October 2014	09:30	Repechage 1
Saturday, 4 October 2014	09:30	Final of repechage
Saturday, 4 October 2014	09:30	Finals

== Results ==
=== Main bracket ===
==== Final ====
Final
Ku Tsui-ping (TPE)	8
Yekaterina Khupovets (KAZ)	3

==== Top half ====
1/16 finals
Ku Tsui-ping (TPE)	4
Trần Thị Khánh Vy (VIE)	0

1/8 finals
Ku Tsui-ping (TPE)	2
Jang So-young (KOR)	0
Ma Zhining (CHN)	4
Reham Abu Ghazaleh (JOR)	0
Dilnoza Bakirova (UZB)	1
Tsang Yee Ting (HKG)	1
Tippawan Khamsi (THA)	4
Anu Adhikari (NEP)	1

Quarterfinals
Ku Tsui-ping (TPE)	3
Ma Zhining (CHN)	2
Tsang Yee Ting (HKG)	4
Tippawan Khamsi (THA)	1

Semifinals
Ku Tsui-ping (TPE)	3
Tsang Yee Ting (HKG)	0

==== Bottom half ====
1/16 finals

1/8 finals
Cheung I Ching (MAC)	1
Benish Akbar (PAK)	9
Elnura Kamchybekova (KGZ)	3
Yekaterina Khupovets (KAZ)	3
Nasrin Dousti (IRI)	8
Kang Ji-ui (PRK)	0
Srunita Sari Sukatendel (INA)	8
Mabel Arevalo (PHI)	0

Quarterfinals
Benish Akbar (PAK)	0
Yekaterina Khupovets (KAZ)	3
Nasrin Dousti (IRI)	4
Srunita Sari Sukatendel (INA)	3

Semifinals
Yekaterina Khupovets (KAZ)	4
Nasrin Dousti (IRI)	0

=== Repechage ===
Repechage 1
Trần Thị Khánh Vy (VIE)	0
Jang So-young (KOR)	1

Final of repechage
Jang So-young (KOR)	1
Ma Zhining (CHN)	0
Elnura Kamchybekova (KGZ)	4
Benish Akbar (PAK)	1

Bronze medal contest
Jang So-young (KOR)	2
Tsang Yee Ting (HKG)	2
Elnura Kamchybekova (KGZ)	1
Nasrin Dousti (IRI)	6
