= Tang Lingling =

Chinese karateka (born 1987)

Personal information
- Born: 8 March 1987 (age 39)

Sport
- Country: China
- Sport: Karate
- Weight class: 68 kg
- Event: Kumite
Medal record
Women's karate
Representing China
Asian Games
Silver medal – second place	2014 Incheon	Kumite 68 kg
Silver medal – second place	2018 Jakarta	Kumite 68 kg
Bronze medal – third place	2010 Guangzhou	Kumite +68 kg
World Championships
Bronze medal – third place	2010 Belgrade	Kumite +68 kg
Asian Championships
Gold medal – first place	2013 Dubai	Kumite 68 kg
Silver medal – second place	2011 Quanzhou	Kumite 68 kg
Silver medal – second place	2013 Dubai	Team kumite
Silver medal – second place	2017 Astana	Kumite 68 kg
Bronze medal – third place	2009 Foshan	Kumite +68 kg
Bronze medal – third place	2018 Amman	Kumite 68 kg
Bronze medal – third place	2018 Amman	Team kumite
Bronze medal – third place	2019 Tashkent	Team kumite

Tang Lingling (born 8 March 1987) is a Chinese karateka. She is a two-time silver medalist at the Asian Games in 2014 and 2018. In both finals she lost against Guzaliya Gafurova of Kazakhstan. She is also a bronze medalist at the World Karate Championships.

She won one of the bronze medals in the women's kumite +68 kg at the 2010 Asian Games held in Guangzhou, China.

In 2013, she won the gold medal in the women's 68 kg event at the 2013 Asian Karate Championships held in Dubai, United Arab Emirates. She also won the silver medal in the women's team kumite event.
