= Karate at the 2022 Asian Games – Women's kumite 55 kg =

Women's kumite 55 kg at the 2022 Asian Games
- Venue: Linping Sports Centre Gymnasium
- Date: 7 October 2023
- Competitors: 14 from 14 nations

Medalists
gold medal	Sevinch Rakhimova	Uzbekistan
silver medal	Ku Tsui-ping	Chinese Taipei
bronze medal	Fatemeh Saadati	Iran
bronze medal	Ding Jiamei	China

The women's kumite 55 kilograms competition at the 2022 Asian Games took place on 7 October 2023 at Linping Sports Centre Gymnasium, Hangzhou.

== Schedule ==
All times are China Standard Time (UTC+08:00)

Date	Time	Event
Saturday, 7 October 2023	08:30	Round of 16
Saturday, 7 October 2023	08:30	Quarterfinals
Saturday, 7 October 2023	08:30	Semifinals
Saturday, 7 October 2023	08:30	Repechages
Saturday, 7 October 2023	14:00	Finals

== Results ==
=== Main bracket ===
Round of 16
Leen Mansour (JOR)	11
Madhuri Poovanesan (MAS)	2
Wong Sok I (MAC)	0
Fatemeh Saadati (IRI)	6
Hoàng Thị Mỹ Tâm (VIE)	0
Ku Tsui-ping (TPE)	2
Sabira Gul (PAK)	1
Lim Sok Vicheka (CAM)	5
Choi Wan Yu (HKG)	2
Ding Jiamei (CHN)	6
Sirikamonnate Chokprasertgul (THA)	0
Sevinch Rakhimova (UZB)	1

Quarterfinals
Cok Istri Agung Sanistyarani (INA)	3
Leen Mansour (JOR)	0
Fatemeh Saadati (IRI)	0
Ku Tsui-ping (TPE)	4
Hwang Soo-hyun (KOR)	9
Lim Sok Vicheka (CAM)	2
Ding Jiamei (CHN)	0
Sevinch Rakhimova (UZB)	7

Semifinals
Cok Istri Agung Sanistyarani (INA)	3
Ku Tsui-ping (TPE)	7
Hwang Soo-hyun (KOR)	0
Sevinch Rakhimova (UZB)	8

Gold medal contest
Ku Tsui-ping (TPE)	1
Sevinch Rakhimova (UZB)	9

=== Repechage ===
Repechage round 1
Hoàng Thị Mỹ Tâm (VIE)	0
Fatemeh Saadati (IRI)	7
Sirikamonnate Chokprasertgul (THA)	1
Ding Jiamei (CHN)	6

Bronze medal bouts
Fatemeh Saadati (IRI)	3
Cok Istri Agung Sanistyarani (INA)	0
Ding Jiamei (CHN)	6
Hwang Soo-hyun (KOR)	2
