= Yekaterina Khupovets =

Kazakhstani karateka

Sport
- Country: Kazakhstan
- Sport: Karate
- Weight class: 50 kg
- Event: Kumite
Medal record
Women's karate
Representing Kazakhstan
Asian Games
Silver medal – second place	2014 Incheon	Kumite 50 kg
Asian Championships
Bronze medal – third place	2011 Quanzhou	Kumite 55 kg
Bronze medal – third place	2017 Astana	Kumite 50 kg
Bronze medal – third place	2017 Astana	Team kumite

Yekaterina Khupovets (Екатерина Андреевна Хуповец (Гибатова) born 21 July 1992) is a Kazakhstani karateka. She won the silver medal in the women's kumite 50 kg event at the 2014 Asian Games held in Incheon, South Korea.

In 2010, she competed in the women's kumite 55 kg event at the Asian Games held in Guangzhou, China without winning a medal. She was eliminated in her first match by Fatemeh Chalaki. At the 2017 Asian Karate Championships held in Astana, Kazakhstan, she won one of the bronze medals in both the women's kumite 50 kg event and the women's team kumite events.

== Achievements ==
Year	Competition	Venue	Rank	Event
2011	Asian Championships	Quanzhou, China	3rd	Kumite 55 kg
2014	Asian Games	Incheon, South Korea	2nd	Kumite 50 kg
2017	Asian Championships	Astana, Kazakhstan	3rd	Kumite 50 kg
2017	Asian Championships	Astana, Kazakhstan	3rd	Team kumite
