= Karate at the 2015 Pan American Games – Men's 75 kg =

Men's 75 kg at the 2015 Pan American Games
- Venue: Mississauga Sports Centre
- Dates: July 24
- Competitors: 8 from 8 nations

Medalists
Gold medal	Thomas Scott	United States
Silver medal	Alexander Nicastro	Venezuela
Bronze medal	Patrice Boily-Martineau	Canada
Bronze medal	Franco Icasati	Argentina

The men's 75 kg competition of the karate events at the 2015 Pan American Games in Toronto, Ontario, Canada, was held on July 24 at the Mississauga Sports Centre.

== Schedule ==
All times are Central Standard Time (UTC-6).

Date	Time	Round
July 24, 2015	16:15	Pool matches
July 24, 2015	20:45	Semifinals
July 24, 2015	21:25	Final

== Results ==
The final results.

Legend

- KK — Forfeit (Kiken)

=== Pool 1 ===
Athlete	Nation	Pld	W	D	L	Points		
Athlete	Nation	Pld	W	D	L	GF	GA	Diff
Thomas Scott	United States	3	2	0	1	5	4	+3
Franco Icasati	Argentina	3	2	0	1	8	8	0
David Dubó	Chile	3	1	1	1	2	1	+1
Esteban Espinosa	Ecuador	3	0	1	2	4	6	-2

	Score	
David Dubó (CHI)	0–0	Esteban Espinosa (ECU)
Thomas Scott (USA)	4–2	Franco Icasati (ARG)
David Dubó (CHI)	2–0	Thomas Scott (USA)
Esteban Espinosa (ECU)	4–5	Franco Icasati (ARG)
David Dubó (CHI)	0–1	Franco Icasati (ARG)
Esteban Espinosa (ECU)	0–1	Thomas Scott (USA)

=== Pool 2 ===
Athlete	Nation	Pld	W	D	L	Points		
Athlete	Nation	Pld	W	D	L	GF	GA	Diff
Alexander Nicastro	Venezuela	3	1	2	0	11	9	+2
Patrice Boily-Martineau	Canada	3	1	1	1	7	7	0
Juan Landázuri	Colombia	3	1	1	1	8	9	-1
Dionicio Gustavo	Dominican Republic	3	0	2	1	7	8	-1

	Score	
Juan Landázuri (COL)	3–5	Patrice Boily-Martineau (CAN)
Alexander Nicastro (VEN)	5–5	Dionicio Gustavo (DOM)
Juan Landázuri (COL)	2–2	Alexander Nicastro (VEN)
Patrice Boily-Martineau (CAN)	0–0	Dionicio Gustavo (DOM)
Juan Landázuri (COL)	3–2	Dionicio Gustavo (DOM)
Patrice Boily-Martineau (CAN)	2–4	Alexander Nicastro (VEN)

=== Finals ===
Semifinals
Thomas Scott (USA)	5
Patrice Boily-Martineau (CAN)	0
Franco Icasati (ARG)	0
Alexander Nicastro (VEN)	2

Gold medal match
Thomas Scott (USA)	4
Alexander Nicastro (VEN)	3
