= Karate at the 2014 Asian Games – Women's kumite 68 kg =

Karate competition

Women's kumite 68 kg at the 2014 Asian Games
- Venue: Gyeyang Gymnasium
- Date: 3 October 2014
- Competitors: 11 from 11 nations

Medalists
gold medal	Guzaliya Gafurova	Kazakhstan
silver medal	Tang Lingling	China
bronze medal	Chao Jou	Chinese Taipei
bronze medal	Shree Sharmini Segaran	Malaysia

The women's kumite 68 kilograms competition at the 2014 Asian Games in Incheon, South Korea was held on 3 October 2014 at the Gyeyang Gymnasium.

== Schedule ==
All times are Korea Standard Time (UTC+09:00)

Date	Time	Event
Friday, 3 October 2014	13:30	1/8 finals
Friday, 3 October 2014	13:30	Quarterfinals
Friday, 3 October 2014	13:30	Semifinals
Friday, 3 October 2014	13:30	Final of repechage
Friday, 3 October 2014	13:30	Finals

== Results ==
=== Main bracket ===
1/8 finals
Nour Abusalah (JOR)	0
Tang Lingling (CHN)	7
Chao Jou (TPE)	1
Joanna Ylanan (PHI)	1
Pegah Zangeneh (IRI)	1
Kulsoom Hazara (PAK)	0

Quarterfinals
Tang Lingling (CHN)	8
Anupama Magar (NEP)	0
Chao Jou (TPE)	4
Dilnoza Ganieva (UZB)	1
Pegah Zangeneh (IRI)	2
Guzaliya Gafurova (KAZ)	5
Shree Sharmini Segaran (MAS)	3
Kayo Someya (JPN)	0

Semifinals
Tang Lingling (CHN)	2
Chao Jou (TPE)	2
Guzaliya Gafurova (KAZ)	2
Shree Sharmini Segaran (MAS)	0

Final
Tang Lingling (CHN)	3
Guzaliya Gafurova (KAZ)	4

=== Repechage ===
Final of repechage
Nour Abusalah (JOR)	7
Anupama Magar (NEP)	0

Bronze medal contest
Nour Abusalah (JOR)	2
Chao Jou (TPE)	2
Pegah Zangeneh (IRI)	1
Shree Sharmini Segaran (MAS)	2
