= Dastonbek Otabolaev =

Uzbekistani karateka (born 1993)

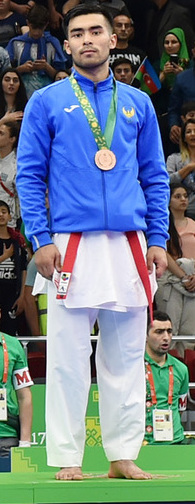
- Otabolaev in 2017

Personal information
- Born: 5 November 1993 (age 32)

Sport
- Country: Uzbekistan
- Sport: Karate
- Weight class: 75 kg
- Event: Kumite
Medal record
World Championships
Gold medal – first place	2021 Dubai	Kumite 75 kg
World Games
Bronze medal – third place	2022 Birmingham	Kumite 75 kg
Asian Championships
Bronze medal – third place	2019 Tashkent	Team kumite
Bronze medal – third place	2022 Tashkent	Team kumite
Islamic Solidarity Games
Bronze medal – third place	2017 Baku	Kumite 75 kg

Dastonbek Otabolaev (born 5 November 1993) is an Uzbekistani karateka. He won the gold medal in the men's 75 kg event at the 2021 World Karate Championships held in Dubai, United Arab Emirates. He is the first ever Uzbek and Central Asian Karate World Champion. He is Master of sport international level and Black belt 4-dan. He is Captain national karate team of Uzbekistan. and He won the bronze medal first time history of Uzbekistan Karate at the 2022 World Games

At the 2016 World University Karate Championships held in Braga, Portugal, he won one of the bronze medals in the men's kumite 75 kg event. He also won one of the bronze medals in the men's kumite 75 kg event at the 2017 Islamic Solidarity Games held in Baku, Azerbaijan.

In 2018, he competed in the men's kumite 75 kg event at the Asian Games held in Jakarta, Indonesia where he was eliminated in his first match by eventual bronze medalist Bashar Al-Najjar of Jordan. At the 2019 Asian Karate Championships held in Tashkent, Uzbekistan, he won one of the bronze medals in the men's team kumite event.

In June 2021, he competed at the World Olympic Qualification Tournament held in Paris, France hoping to qualify for the 2020 Summer Olympics in Tokyo, Japan. In Paris, Otabolaev failed to qualify for the Olympics.

He has also won medals at several competitions of the Karate1 Premier League.

== Personal life ==
He was born in Altyarikh, Ferghana. He started karate when he was 7 years old. Growing up, Otabolaev discovered karate from a Bruce Lee movie. In addition to karate, Otabolaev is studying for a magistracy in TSUL as a lawyer and works for a lawyer firm. He also enjoys reading books.

== Career ==
In addition to karate, Dastonbek Otabolaev also trains boxing.

In Paris, Otabolaev looked to make the Uzbek team in karate. While he won five of his seven bouts, he did not make the cut for the team.

On November 21, 2021, Otabolaev won gold in the 2021 Karate World Championship. Ahead of his World Championship run, Otabolaev promised his mother that he would win the World Championship.

He won the bronze medal in the men's kumite 75 kg event at the 2022 World Games held in Birmingham, United States.
