= 2021 World Karate Championships – Men's 75 kg =

World Karate Championship

Men's kumite 75 kg at the 2021 World Karate Championships
- Venue: Hamdan Sports Complex
- Location: Dubai, United Arab Emirates
- Dates: 16–20 November
- Competitors: 73 from 73 nations

Medalists
gold medal	Dastonbek Otabolaev	Uzbekistan
silver medal	Abdalla Abdelaziz	Egypt
bronze medal	Nurkanat Azhikanov	Kazakhstan
bronze medal	Thomas Scott	United States

The Men's 75 kg competition at the 2021 World Karate Championships was held from 16 to 20 November 2021.

== Results ==
=== Finals ===
Semifinals
(Belgium) Quentin Mahauden	0
(Egypt) Abdalla Abdelaziz	3
(United States) Thomas Scott	0
(Uzbekistan) Dastonbek Otabolaev	1

Final
(Egypt) Abdalla Abdelaziz	3
(Uzbekistan) Dastonbek Otabolaev	4

=== Repechage ===
Repechage 1
(Kosovo) Elhami Shabani	1
(Denmark) Mads Viberg Larsen	6

Repechage 2
(Denmark) Mads Viberg Larsen	0
(Poland) Maciej Drążewski	0

Repechage 3
(Denmark) Mads Viberg Larsen	1
(Hungary) Gábor Hárspataki	3

Repechage 4
(Hungary) Gábor Hárspataki	3
(Kazakhstan) Nurkanat Azhikanov	5

Bronze medal
(Kazakhstan) Nurkanat Azhikanov	3
(Belgium) Quentin Mahauden	0

Repechage 2
(Lithuania) Remigijus Jurgilaitis	3
(Kuwait) Omar Al-Ajenaei	4

Repechage 3
(Kuwait) Omar Al-Ajenaei	3
(Switzerland) Raffaele Di Gioia	1

Repechage 4
(Kuwait) Omar Al-Ajenaei	4
(Turkey) Eren Akkurt	5

Bronze medal
(Turkey) Eren Akkurt	2
(United States) Thomas Scott	5

=== Top half ===
==== Section 1 ====
First round
(Bolivia) Alex Meneses	0
(North Macedonia) Peter Zaborski	1
(Cyprus) Panayiotis Loizides	0
(Luxembourg) Jordan Neves	1
(Morocco) Oussama Fahssi	1
(Italy) Ahmed El Sharaby	2

Second round
(North Macedonia) Peter Zaborski	3
(Spain) Carlos Bargado	2
(Croatia) Enes Garibović	0
Kamil Salaev	0
(Luxembourg) Jordan Neves	3
(Hong Kong) Lee Ka Wai	0
(Belgium) Quentin Mahauden	10
(Canada) Nicholas Rivest	3
(Italy) Ahmed El Sharaby	4
(Austria) Luca Rettenbacher	4
(Colombia) Luis Triviño	1
(Greece) Vasilis Vroutsis	0
(India) Manish	4
(Republic of Ireland) Dean O'Mahony	3
(Montenegro) Balsa Miličković	0
(Jordan) Hasan Masarweh	2

Third round
(North Macedonia) Peter Zaborski	1
(Croatia) Enes Garibović	0
(Luxembourg) Jordan Neves	0
(Belgium) Quentin Mahauden	2
(Austria) Luca Rettenbacher	0
(Colombia) Luis Triviño	1
(India) Manish	0
(Jordan) Hasan Masarweh	10

Fourth round
(North Macedonia) Peter Zaborski	3
(Belgium) Quentin Mahauden	4
(Colombia) Luis Triviño	0
(Jordan) Hasan Masarweh	3

Quarterfinals
(Belgium) Quentin Mahauden	4
(Jordan) Hasan Masarweh	4

==== Section 2 ====
First round
(Kosovo) Elhami Shabani	0
(Egypt) Abdalla Abdelaziz	6
(Kazakhstan) Nurkanat Azhikanov	2
(Romania) Mario Damian	1

Second round
(Egypt) Abdalla Abdelaziz	9
(Denmark) Mads Viberg Larsen	0
(Poland) Maciej Drążewski	2
(Kenya) Stephen Mapale	2
(South Africa) Tyrone Carson Gray	0
(Algeria) Youcef Boukhecheba	2
(Turkmenistan) Esenbaý Ýazmedow	0
(Hungary) Gábor Hárspataki	2
(Kazakhstan) Nurkanat Azhikanov	2
(Saudi Arabia) Ali Barnawi	0
(Cameroon) Pierre Clery Aboya Baya	7
(Iceland) Ólafur Engilbert Árnason	9
(Kyrgyzstan) Taalaibek Shekitaev	0
(Portugal) Miguel Diz	0
(Georgia (country)) Luka Vasadze	3
(England) Joe Kellaway	0

Third round
(Egypt) Abdalla Abdelaziz	3
(Poland) Maciej Drążewski	1
(Algeria) Youcef Boukhecheba	0
(Hungary) Gábor Hárspataki	4
(Kazakhstan) Nurkanat Azhikanov	2
(Iceland) Ólafur Engilbert Árnason	0
(Portugal) Miguel Diz	6
(Georgia (country)) Luka Vasadze	2

Fourth round
(Egypt) Abdalla Abdelaziz	4
(Hungary) Gábor Hárspataki	2
(Kazakhstan) Nurkanat Azhikanov	1
(Portugal) Miguel Diz	0

Quarterfinals
(Egypt) Abdalla Abdelaziz	5
(Kazakhstan) Nurkanat Azhikanov	4

=== Bottom half ===
==== Section 3 ====
First round
(Jamaica) Alton Brown	0
(Brazil) Hernani Verissimo	1
(Ukraine) Stanislav Horuna	0
(Netherlands) Timothy Petersen	2

Second round
(Brazil) Hernani Verissimo	1
(Armenia) Davit Makyan	0
(Sweden) William Engman	0
(France) Kilian Cizo	5
(Japan) Ryota Nakamura	5
Ignatius Joshua Kandou	1
(Pakistan) Saadi Abbas Jalbani	8
(Singapore) Ivan Koh	0
(Netherlands) Timothy Petersen	4
(Australia) Mitchell Durham	0
(United States) Thomas Scott	4
(Nepal) Mahammed Shekhu Alam	0
(Germany) David Kuhn	0
(Belarus) Ivan Korabau	2
(Chinese Taipei) Lee Feng-jen	0
(Azerbaijan) Rafael Aghayev	1

Third round
(Brazil) Hernani Verissimo	3
(France) Kilian Cizo	4
(Japan) Ryota Nakamura	1
(Pakistan) Saadi Abbas Jalbani	4
(Netherlands) Timothy Petersen	2
(United States) Thomas Scott	4
(Belarus) Ivan Korabau	0
(Azerbaijan) Rafael Aghayev	2

Fourth round
(France) Kilian Cizo	0
(Pakistan) Saadi Abbas Jalbani	1
(United States) Thomas Scott	3
(Azerbaijan) Rafael Aghayev	3

Quarterfinals
(Pakistan) Saadi Abbas Jalbani	0
(United States) Thomas Scott	0

==== Section 4 ====
First round
(Mexico) Carlos Villarreal	9
(Bulgaria) Stefan Petkov	2
(Bosnia and Herzegovina) Hamza Turulja	0
(Chile) Joaquín González	5

Second round
(Mexico) Carlos Villarreal	9
(Botswana) Gofaone Mosupiemang	0
(Switzerland) Raffaele Di Gioia	3
(Czech Republic) Matyáš Malý	2
(Qatar) Qassim Ghavidel	7
(Kuwait) Omar Al-Ajenaei	7
(Uzbekistan) Dastonbek Otabolaev	1
(Lithuania) Remigijus Jurgilaitis	0
(Chile) Joaquín González	2
(Democratic Republic of the Congo) Artur Loubo	0
(Albania) Bekim Basha	1
(Serbia) Đorđe Salapura	4
(Slovakia) David Podsklan	2
(Turkey) Eren Akkurt	2
(South Korea) Pi Jae-yoon	2
(Ecuador) Luis Chóez	3

Third round
(Mexico) Carlos Villarreal	3
(Switzerland) Raffaele Di Gioia	4
(Kuwait) Omar Al-Ajenaei	2
(Uzbekistan) Dastonbek Otabolaev	10
(Chile) Joaquín González	3
(Serbia) Đorđe Salapura	2
(Turkey) Eren Akkurt	3
(Ecuador) Luis Chóez	1

Fourth round
(Switzerland) Raffaele Di Gioia	0
(Uzbekistan) Dastonbek Otabolaev	4
(Chile) Joaquín González	1
(Turkey) Eren Akkurt	1

Quarterfinals
(Uzbekistan) Dastonbek Otabolaev	1
(Turkey) Eren Akkurt	0
