= Karate at the 2010 Asian Games – Women's kumite +68 kg =

Karate competition

Women's kumite +68 kg at the 2010 Asian Games
- Venue: Guangdong Gymnasium
- Date: 25 November 2010
- Competitors: 8 from 8 nations

Medalists
gold medal	Manar Shath	Jordan
silver medal	Jamaliah Jamaludin	Malaysia
bronze medal	Paula Carion	Macau
bronze medal	Tang Lingling	China

The women's kumite +68 kilograms competition at the 2010 Asian Games in Guangzhou, China was held on 25 November 2010 at the Guangdong Gymnasium.

== Schedule ==
All times are China Standard Time (UTC+08:00)

Date	Time	Event
Thursday, 25 November 2010	09:30	Quarterfinals
Thursday, 25 November 2010	09:30	Semifinals
Thursday, 25 November 2010	09:30	Bronze medal match
Thursday, 25 November 2010	09:30	Final

== Results ==
=== Main bracket ===
Quarterfinals		Semifinals		Final
Paula Carion (MAC)	0
Jamaliah Jamaludin (MAS)	1	Jamaliah Jamaludin (MAS)	1
Gaukhar Chaikuzova (KAZ)	2	Gaukhar Chaikuzova (KAZ)	0
Hamideh Abbasali (IRI)	1			Jamaliah Jamaludin (MAS)	2
Park Jin-a (KOR)	0			Manar Shath (JOR)	5
Manar Shath (JOR)	8	Manar Shath (JOR)	5
Tang Lingling (CHN)	1	Tang Lingling (CHN)	2
Nadira Kazakova (UZB)	0

=== Repechage ===
Bronze medal match
Paula Carion (MAC)	7
Gaukhar Chaikuzova (KAZ)	4
Park Jin-a (KOR)	1
Tang Lingling (CHN)	2
