= Karate at the 2018 Asian Games – Women's kumite 68 kg =

Karate competition

Women's kumite 68 kg at the 2018 Asian Games
- Venue: Jakarta Convention Center
- Date: 27 August 2018
- Competitors: 11 from 11 nations

Medalists
gold medal	Guzaliya Gafurova	Kazakhstan
silver medal	Tang Lingling	China
bronze medal	Pegah Zangeneh	Iran
bronze medal	Kayo Someya	Japan

The women's kumite 68 kilograms competition at the 2018 Asian Games took place on 27 August 2018 at Jakarta Convention Center Plenary Hall, Jakarta, Indonesia.

== Schedule ==
All times are Western Indonesia Time (UTC+07:00)

Date	Time	Event
Monday, 27 August 2018	09:00	1/8 finals
Monday, 27 August 2018	09:00	Quarterfinals
Monday, 27 August 2018	09:00	Semifinals
Monday, 27 August 2018	09:00	Final of repechage
Monday, 27 August 2018	09:00	Finals

== Results ==
=== Main bracket ===
1/8 finals
Ceyco Georgia Zefanya (INA)	1
Nguyễn Thị Ngoan (VIE)	3
Guzaliya Gafurova (KAZ)	3
Dildor Annadurdieva (UZB)	0
Chao Jou (TPE)	9
Noviana Marques (TLS)	0

Quarterfinals
Nguyễn Thị Ngoan (VIE)	5
Kulsoom Hazara (PAK)	0
Guzaliya Gafurova (KAZ)	0
Pegah Zangeneh (IRI)	0
Chao Jou (TPE)	2
Lim Mee-seong (KOR)	0
Kayo Someya (JPN)	0
Tang Lingling (CHN)	1

Semifinals
Nguyễn Thị Ngoan (VIE)	5
Guzaliya Gafurova (KAZ)	8
Chao Jou (TPE)	0
Tang Lingling (CHN)	5

Final
Guzaliya Gafurova (KAZ)	2
Tang Lingling (CHN)	0

=== Repechage ===
Final of repechage
Dildor Annadurdieva (UZB)	0
Pegah Zangeneh (IRI)	3

Bronze medals
Pegah Zangeneh (IRI)	10
Nguyễn Thị Ngoan (VIE)	0
Kayo Someya (JPN)	3
Chao Jou (TPE)	1
