= Karate at the 2023 Pan American Games – Men's 75 kg =

Men's 75 kg at the 2023 Pan American Games
- Venue: Contact Sports Center
- Dates: November 5
- Competitors: 9 from 9 nations

Medalists
Gold medal	Thomas Scott	United States
Silver medal	Carlos Villarreal	Mexico
Bronze medal	Juan Landázuri	Colombia
Bronze medal	Allan Maldonado	Independent Athletes Team

The men's 75 kg competition of the karate events at the 2023 Pan American Games was held on November 5 at the Contact Sports Center (Centro de Entrenamiento de los Deportes de Contacto) in Santiago, Chile.

== Schedule ==
Date	Time	Round
November 5, 2023	10:52	Pool matches
November 5, 2023	12:59	Semifinals
November 5, 2023	13:20	Final

== Results ==
The athletes with the two best scores of each pool advance to the semifinals.

=== Pool A ===
Rk	Athlete	Pld	W	L	Pts.
1	Carlos Villareal (MEX)	3	2	0	6
2	Thomas Scott (USA)	3	2	0	6
3	Francisco Barrios (URU)	3	1	2	3
4	Ryan O'Neil (CAN)	3	0	3	0

	Score	
Thomas Scott (USA)	3–2	Ryan O'Neil (CAN)
Francisco Barrios (URU)	0–8	Carlos Villareal (MEX)
Thomas Scott (USA)	8–0	Francisco Barrios (URU)
Ryan O'Neil (CAN)	4–5	Carlos Villareal (MEX)
Thomas Scott (USA)	0–0	Carlos Villareal (MEX)
Ryan O'Neil (CAN)	4–5	Francisco Barrios (URU)

=== Pool B ===
Rk	Athlete	Pld	W	L	Pts.
1	Allan Maldonado (EAI)	4	3	1	9
2	Juan Landázuri (COL)	4	3	1	9
3	Matías Rodríguez (CHI)	4	3	1	9
4	Alisson Sobrinho (BRA)	4	1	3	3
5	Safin Kasturi (USA)	4	0	4	0

	Score	
Matías Rodríguez (CHI)	6–3	Safin Kasturi (USA)
Juan Landázuri (COL)	7–2	Alisson Sobrinho (BRA)
Matías Rodríguez (CHI)	1–8	Allan Maldonado (EAI)
Safin Kasturi (USA)	0–5	Juan Landázuri (COL)
Allan Maldonado (EAI)	5–1	Alisson Sobrinho (BRA)
Safin Kasturi (USA)	1–3	Alisson Sobrinho (BRA)
Matías Rodríguez (CHI)	1–1	Juan Landázuri (COL)
Safin Kasturi (USA)	3–8	Allan Maldonado (EAI)
Matías Rodríguez (CHI)	0–0	Alisson Sobrinho (BRA)
Allan Maldonado (EAI)	4–3	Juan Landázuri (COL)

=== Finals ===
The results were as follows:

Semifinals
Carlos Villarreal (MEX)	0
Juan Landázuri (COL)	0
Allan Maldonado (EAI)	5
Thomas Scott (USA)	USA

Gold medal match
Carlos Villarreal (MEX)	2
Thomas Scott (USA)	3
