= Jintar Simanjuntak =

Indonesian karateka (born 1987)

Personal information
- Born: 4 November 1987 (age 38)

Sport
- Country: Indonesia
- Sport: Karate
- Weight class: 67 kg
- Event: Kumite
Medal record
Men's karate
Representing Indonesia
Asian Games
Bronze medal – third place	2018 Jakarta–Palembang	Kumite 67 kg
Southeast Asian Games
Gold medal – first place	2011 Jakarta–Palembang	Kumite 67 kg
Gold medal – first place	2011 Jakarta–Palembang	Team kumite
Gold medal – first place	2013 Naypyidaw	Kumite 67 kg
Silver medal – second place	2009 Vientiane	Kumite 67 kg
Bronze medal – third place	2013 Naypyidaw	Team kumite
Bronze medal – third place	2017 Kuala Lumpur	Kumite 67 kg
Bronze medal – third place	2017 Kuala Lumpur	Team kumite

Jintar Simanjuntak (born 4 November 1987) is an Indonesian karateka. At the Southeast Asian Games he won the gold medal in the men's kumite 67 kg event both in 2011 and in 2013. He is also a bronze medalist at the 2018 Asian Games.

== Career ==
In 2018, he won one of the bronze medals in the men's kumite 67 kg event at the Asian Games held in Jakarta, Indonesia. His win at the Asian Games marked the end of his competitive sports career.

He also represented Indonesia at the 2010 Asian Games in Guangzhou, China and at the 2014 Asian Games in Incheon, South Korea without winning a medal. In 2010, he competed in the men's kumite 67 kg event and in 2014 he also competed in the men's kumite 67 kg event.

== Achievements ==
Year	Competition	Venue	Rank	Event
2009	Southeast Asian Games	Vientiane, Laos	2nd	Kumite 67 kg
2011	Southeast Asian Games	Jakarta–Palembang, Indonesia	1st	Kumite 67 kg
2011	Southeast Asian Games	Jakarta–Palembang, Indonesia	1st	Team kumite
2013	Southeast Asian Games	Naypyidaw, Myanmar	1st	Kumite 67 kg
2013	Southeast Asian Games	Naypyidaw, Myanmar	3rd	Team kumite
2017	Southeast Asian Games	Kuala Lumpur, Malaysia	3rd	Kumite 67 kg
2017	Southeast Asian Games	Kuala Lumpur, Malaysia	3rd	Team kumite
2018	Asian Games	Jakarta, Indonesia	3rd	Kumite 67 kg
