= Guzaliya Gafurova =

Kazakhstani karateka (born 1992)

Personal information
- Born: 23 August 1992 (age 33)

Sport
- Country: Kazakhstan
- Sport: Karate
- Weight class: 68 kg
- Event: Kumite
Medal record
Women's karate
Representing Kazakhstan
Asian Games
Gold medal – first place	2014 Incheon	Kumite 68 kg
Gold medal – first place	2018 Jakarta	Kumite 68 kg
Asian Championships
Silver medal – second place	2015 Yokohama	Kumite 68 kg

Guzaliya Gafurova (born 23 August 1992) is a Kazakhstani karateka. She won the gold medal in the women's kumite 68 kg event at the Asian Games both in 2014 and 2018. In both finals she earned her victory by defeating Tang Lingling of China.

In 2015, she won the silver medal in the women's kumite 68 kg event at the Asian Karate Championships held in Yokohama, Japan.

== Achievements ==
Year	Competition	Venue	Rank	Event
2014	Asian Games	Incheon, South Korea	1st	Kumite 68 kg
2015	Asian Championships	Yokohama, Japan	2nd	Kumite 68 kg
2018	Asian Games	Jakarta, Indonesia	1st	Kumite 68 kg
