= Rinat Sagandykov =

Kazakhstani karateka

Sport
- Country: Kazakhstan
- Sport: Karate
- Weight class: 67 kg
- Event: Kumite
Medal record
Men's karate
Representing Kazakhstan
Asian Games
Gold medal – first place	2010 Guangzhou	Kumite 67 kg
Silver medal – second place	2014 Incheon	Kumite 67 kg
Islamic Solidarity Games
Silver medal – second place	2005 Medina	Kumite 55 kg

Rinat Sagandykov (Ринат Сансызбаевич Сагандыков, born 3 December 1987) is a Kazakhstani karateka. He won the gold medal in the men's kumite 67 kg event at the 2010 Asian Games held in Guangzhou, China.

Sagandykov competed in the men's kumite 65 kg event at the 2006 Asian Games where he was eliminated in his first match by Magid Adwan of Qatar.

He won the silver medal in the men's kumite 67 kg event at the 2014 Asian Games held in Incheon, South Korea.

== Achievements ==
Year	Competition	Venue	Rank	Event
2005	Islamic Solidarity Games	Medina, Saudi Arabia	2nd	Kumite 55 kg
2010	Asian Games	Guangzhou, China	1st	Kumite 67 kg
2014	Asian Games	Incheon, South Korea	2nd	Kumite 67 kg
