= Allan Maldonado =

Guatemalan karateka (born 1994)

Personal information
- Born: 22 May 1994 (age 32)

Sport
- Country: Guatemala
- Sport: Karate
- Weight class: 75 kg
- Event: Kumite
Medal record
Men's karate
Representing Guatemala
Pan American Games
Bronze medal – third place	2019 Lima	Kumite 75 kg
Bronze medal – third place	2023 Santiago	Kumite 75 kg
Central American and Caribbean Games
Gold medal – first place	2018 Barranquilla	Kumite 75 kg
Gold medal – first place	2023 San Salvador	Kumite 75 kg
Bolivarian Games
Silver medal – second place	2022 Valledupar	Kumite 75 kg
Silver medal – second place	2025 Lima-Ayacucho	Kumite 75 kg

Allan Maldonado (born 22 May 1994) is a Guatemalan karateka. At the 2019 Pan American Games held in Lima, Peru, he won one of the bronze medals in the men's kumite 75 kg event. He has been coached by Cheili González.

In 2021, he competed at the World Olympic Qualification Tournament held in Paris, France hoping to qualify for the 2020 Summer Olympics in Tokyo, Japan.

He won the silver medal in the men's 75 kg event at the 2022 Bolivarian Games held in Valledupar, Colombia.
