= Nurkanat Azhikanov =

Kazakhstani karateka (born 2001)

Personal information
- Born: 23 February 2001 (age 25)

Sport
- Country: Kazakhstan
- Sport: Karate
- Weight class: 75 kg
Medal record
Men's karate
Representing Kazakhstan
World Championships
Bronze medal – third place	2021 Dubai	Kumite 75 kg
Bronze medal – third place	2021 Dubai	Team kumite
Asian Games
Gold medal – first place	2022 Hangzhou	Kumite 75 kg
Bronze medal – third place	2026 Aichi–Nagoya	Kumite 75 kg
Asian Karate Championships
Gold medal – first place	2021 Almaty	Team kumite
Gold medal – first place	2023 Malacca	Kumite 75 kg
Gold medal – first place	2025 Tashkent	Kumite 75 kg
Silver medal – second place	2022 Tashkent	Team kumite
Silver medal – second place	2026 Bali	Kumite 75 kg
Bronze medal – third place	2021 Almaty	Kumite 75 kg
Bronze medal – third place	2022 Tashkent	Kumite 75 kg
Bronze medal – third place	2025 Tashkent	Team kumite

Nurkanat Azhikanov (Нұрқанат Аралұлы Әжіқанов, born 23 February 2001) is a Kazakhstani Professional karateka, he is currently represents Kazakhstan internationally Kumite (Karate) event.

== Career ==
- He won the silver medal in Junior individual Kumite male -76 kg in 16th Junior Asian Karate Championships in Kazakhstan in the year of 2017

He qualified at the World Olympic Qualification Tournament in Paris, France to represent Kazakhstan in Men's -75 kg Kumite Category at the Karate competition of the 2020 Summer Olympics in Tokyo, Japan.

He won one of the bronze medals in his event at the 2021 Asian Karate Championships held in Almaty, Kazakhstan.

He competed in the men's kumite 75 kg event at the 2022 World Games held in Birmingham, United States. He competed at the 2021 Islamic Solidarity Games held in Konya, Turkey.

In 2023, he won the gold medal in his event at the Asian Karate Championships held in Malacca, Malaysia. He also won the gold medal in the men's kumite 75 kg event at the 2022 Asian Games held in Hangzhou, China.

== Records ==
Competition Results
YEAR	COMPETITION	VENUE	RANK/POSITION	EVENT
2019	2019 KARATE1 SERIES A	Istanbul Turkey	Participate	Individual -75 kg Kumite
2019	18th Asian Junior, Cadet & Under 21 Karate Championships	Kota Kinabalu Malaysia	Participate	U -84 kg Kumite
2018	Karate1 Youth League	Sofia Bulgaria	Participate	Junior -76 kg Kumite
2017	17th Asian Junior, Cadet & Under 21 Karate Championships	Okinawa Japan	Participate	Junior -76 kg Kumite
2017	10th World Junior, Cadet & Under 21 Karate Championships	Tenerife Spain	Participate	Junior -76 kg Kumite
2017	16th Asian Junior, Cadet & Under 21 Karate Championships	Astana Kazakhstan	Silver	Junior -76 kg Kumite
2017	10th WKF Training Camp & Karate 1 Youth Cup	Umag Croatia	Participate	Junior -76 kg Kumite
2015	9th World Junior, Cadet & Under 21 Karate Championships	Jakarta Indonesia	Participate	Junior -76 kg Kumite
