= Hiroto Shinohara =

Japanese karateka

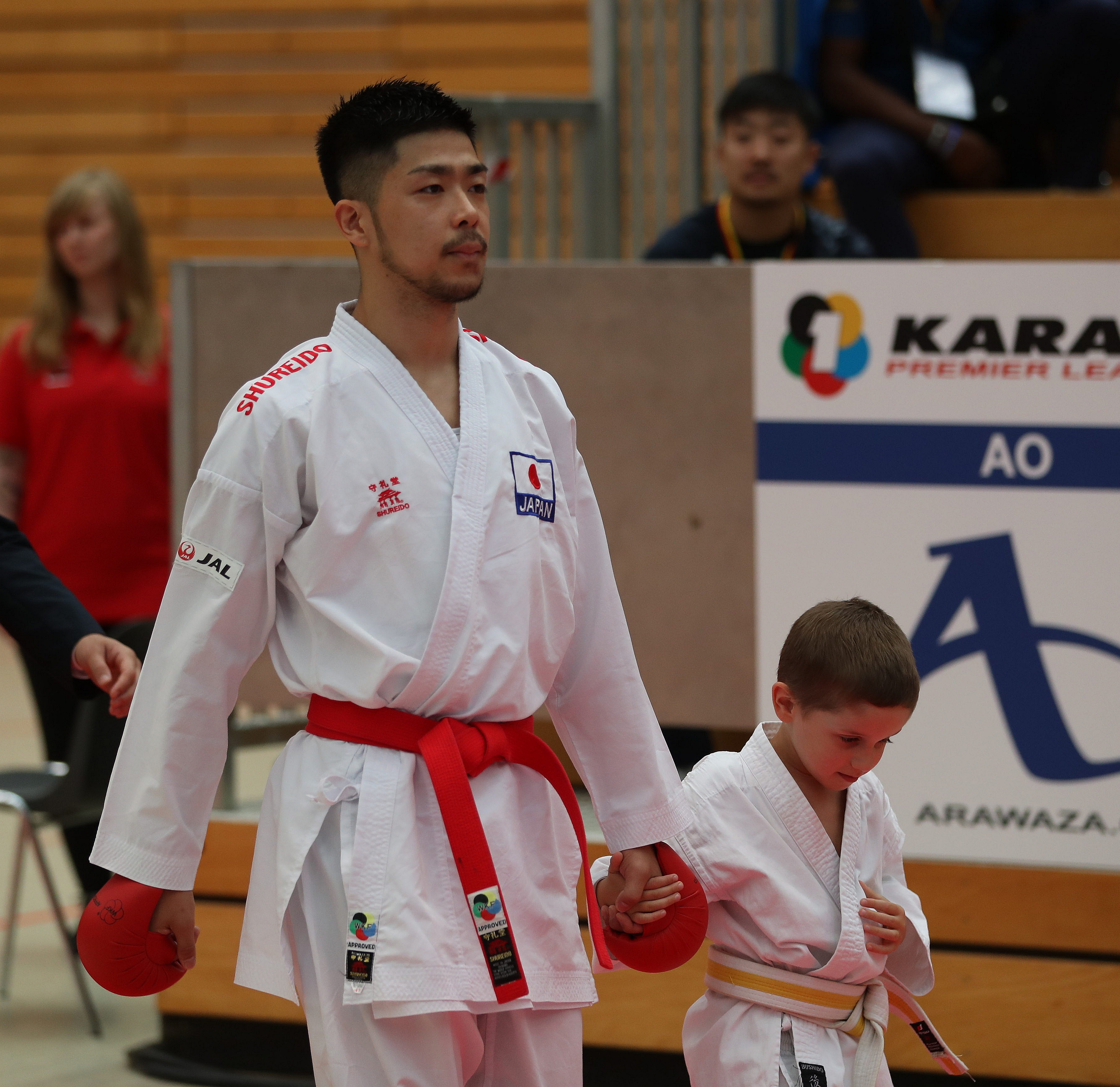
- Hiroto Shinohara in 2018

Sport
- Country: Japan
- Sport: Karate
- Weight class: 67 kg
- Events: Kumite; Team kumite
Medal record
Men's karate
Representing Japan
Asian Games
Gold medal – first place	2014 Incheon	Kumite 67 kg
World Championships
Silver medal – second place	2016 Linz	Team kumite
Bronze medal – third place	2014 Bremen	Team kumite
Asian Championships
Gold medal – first place	2012 Tashkent	Team kumite
Gold medal – first place	2019 Tashkent	Kumite 67 kg
Silver medal – second place	2013 Dubai	Kumite 67 kg
Bronze medal – third place	2018 Amman	Team kumite

Hiroto Shinohara is a Japanese karateka. He won the gold medal in the men's kumite 67 kg event at the 2014 Asian Games which was held in the Incheon, South Korea.

== Career ==
At the 2016 World Karate Championships held in Linz, Austria, he won the silver medal in the men's team kumite event.

In 2018, he competed in the men's kumite 67 kg event at the Asian Games held in the Jakarta, Indonesia without winning a medal.

At the 2019 Asian Karate Championships held in Tashkent, Uzbekistan, he won the gold medal in the men's kumite 67 kg event.

== Achievements ==
Year	Competition	Venue	Rank	Event
2014	World Championships	Bremen, Germany	3rd	Team kumite
2016	World Championships	Linz, Austria	2nd	Team kumite
