= Palestine at the 2022 Asian Games =

Palestine at the multi-sports event

- IOC code: PLE
- NOC: Palestine Olympic Committee

in Hangzhou 19 September 2023 – 8 October 2023
- Competitors: 70 in 15 sports
- Medals Ranked 36th: Gold 0 Silver 0 Bronze 1 Total 1

Asian Games appearances (overview)
- 1990; 1994; 1998; 2002; 2006; 2010; 2014; 2018; 2022; 2026

Palestine competed at the 2022 Asian Games in Hangzhou, Zhejiang, China, which was held from 23 September 2023 to 8 October 2023.

== Competitors ==
Sport	Men	Women	Total
Athletics	2	1	3
Beach volleyball	4	0	4
Boxing	3	0	3
Esports	12	0	12
Football	27	0	27
Golf	1	0	1
Gymnastics	0	1	1
Judo	2	0	2
Ju-jitsu	3	0	3
Karate	1	1	2
Swimming	2	2	4
Taekwondo	2	2	4
Triathlon	2	0	2
Weightlifting	0	1	1
Wrestling	1	0	0
Total	62	8	70

== Medal summary ==
=== Medalists ===
Medal	Name	Sport	Event	Date
Bronze	Hala Al-Qadi	Karate	Women's 68 kg kumite	5 Oct
