= Karate at the 2022 World Games – Men's kumite 75 kg =

Men's kumite 75 kg at the 2022 World Games
- Venue: Bill Battle Coliseum
- Location: Birmingham, United States
- Dates: 9 July
- Competitors: 8 from 8 nations

Medalists
| gold medal | Abdalla Abdelaziz | Egypt |
| silver medal | Stanislav Horuna | Ukraine |
| bronze medal | Dastonbek Otabolaev | Uzbekistan |

The men's kumite 75 kg competition in karate at the 2022 World Games took place on 9 July 2022 at the Bill Battle Coliseum in Birmingham, United States.

== Results ==
=== Elimination round ===
==== Pool A ====
| Pos | Athlete | B | W | D | L | Pts | Score | (United States) | (Uzbekistan) | (Hungary) | (Chinese Taipei) |
|---|---|---|---|---|---|---|---|---|---|---|---|
| 1 | Thomas Scott (USA) | 3 | 2 | 1 | 0 | 5 | 6–3 | — | 1–1 | 2–0 | 3–2 |
| 2 | Dastonbek Otabolaev (UZB) | 3 | 1 | 2 | 0 | 4 | 4–4 | 1–1 | — | 2–2 | 1–1 |
| 3 | Gábor Hárspataki (HUN) | 3 | 1 | 0 | 2 | 2 | 7–5 | 0–2 | 2–2 | — | 5–1 |
| 4 | Hsu Wei-chun (TPE) | 3 | 0 | 1 | 2 | 1 | 4–9 | 2–3 | 1–1 | 1–5 | — |

Source: Birmingham 2022

==== Pool B ====
| Pos | Athlete | B | W | D | L | Pts | Score | (Ukraine) | (Egypt) | (Kazakhstan) | (Belgium) |
|---|---|---|---|---|---|---|---|---|---|---|---|
| 1 | Stanislav Horuna (UKR) | 3 | 3 | 0 | 0 | 6 | 16–8 | — | 6–5 | 8–3 | 2–0 |
| 2 | Abdalla Abdelaziz (EGY) | 3 | 2 | 0 | 1 | 4 | 22–13 | 5–6 | — | 5–3 | 12–4 |
| 3 | Nurkanat Azhikanov (KAZ) | 3 | 0 | 1 | 2 | 1 | 11–18 | 3–8 | 3–5 | — | 5–5 |
| 4 | Quentin Mahauden (BEL) | 3 | 0 | 1 | 2 | 1 | 9–19 | 0–2 | 4–12 | 5–5 | — |

Source: Birmingham 2022

=== Finals ===
Semi-finals
Thomas Scott (USA) | 5
Abdalla Abdelaziz (EGY) | 10
Stanislav Horuna (UKR) | 8
Dastonbek Otabolaev (UZB) | 0

Gold medal bout
Abdalla Abdelaziz (EGY) | 6
Stanislav Horuna (UKR) | 3
Bronze medal bout
Thomas Scott (USA) | 1
Dastonbek Otabolaev (UZB) | 2
