= Karate at the 2018 Asian Games – Men's kumite 75 kg =

Karate competition

Men's kumite 75 kg at the 2018 Asian Games
- Venue: Jakarta Convention Center
- Date: 27 August 2018
- Competitors: 23 from 23 nations

Medalists
gold medal	Bahman Asgari	Iran
silver medal	Raef Al-Turkistani	Saudi Arabia
bronze medal	Hsu Wei-chun	Chinese Taipei
bronze medal	Bashar Al-Najjar	Jordan

The men's kumite 75 kilograms competition at the 2018 Asian Games took place on 27 August 2018 at Jakarta Convention Center Plenary Hall, Jakarta, Indonesia.

== Schedule ==
All times are Western Indonesia Time (UTC+07:00)

Date	Time	Event
Monday, 27 August 2018	09:00	1/16 finals
Monday, 27 August 2018	09:00	1/8 finals
Monday, 27 August 2018	09:00	Quarterfinals
Monday, 27 August 2018	09:00	Semifinals
Monday, 27 August 2018	09:00	Repechage round 1
Monday, 27 August 2018	09:00	Final of repechage
Monday, 27 August 2018	09:00	Finals

== Results ==
Legend

- H — Won by hansoku (8–0)
- K — Won by kiken (8–0)

=== Main bracket ===
==== Final ====
Final
Bahman Asgari (IRI)	5
Raef Al-Turkistani (KSA)	0

==== Top half ====
1/16 finals
Kim Mu-il (KOR)	1
Sharath Kumar Jayendran (IND)	0
Hsu Wei-chun (TPE)	3
Sandy Firmansyah (INA)	3
Teerawat Pongsai (THA)	9
Bounthavy Saatsy (LAO)	0
Bahman Asgari (IRI)	8
Abdul Baset Wahedi (AFG)	0

1/8 finals
Kim Mu-il (KOR)	5
Adnan Shaif (YEM)	0
Hsu Wei-chun (TPE)	2
Yermek Ainazarov (KAZ)	1
Teerawat Pongsai (THA)	0
Li Fali (CHN)	0
Bahman Asgari (IRI)	8
Övgönkhüügiin Khangaikhüü (MGL)	0

Quarterfinals
Kim Mu-il (KOR)	1
Hsu Wei-chun (TPE)	2
Teerawat Pongsai (THA)	0
Bahman Asgari (IRI)	2

Semifinals
Hsu Wei-chun (TPE)	0
Bahman Asgari (IRI)	0

==== Bottom half ====
1/16 finals
Sharmendran Raghonathan (MAS)	3
Daisuke Watanabe (JPN)	1
Hamza Abuleifa (PLE)	0
Saadi Abbas Jalbani (PAK)	3
Dastonbek Otabolaev (UZB)	1
Bashar Al-Najjar (JOR)	4

1/8 finals
Sharmendran Raghonathan (MAS)	9
Kak Seilapanha (CAM)	1
Saadi Abbas Jalbani (PAK)	6
Qassim Ghavidel (QAT)	1
Bashar Al-Najjar (JOR)	5
Chu Đức Thịnh (VIE)	1
Raef Al-Turkistani (KSA)	5
Lee Ka Wai (HKG)	4

Quarterfinals
Sharmendran Raghonathan (MAS)	5
Saadi Abbas Jalbani (PAK)	10
Bashar Al-Najjar (JOR)	1
Raef Al-Turkistani (KSA)	3

Semifinals
Saadi Abbas Jalbani (PAK)	2
Raef Al-Turkistani (KSA)	4

=== Repechage ===
Repechage round 1
Abdul Baset Wahedi (AFG)	K
Övgönkhüügiin Khangaikhüü (MGL)

Final of repechage
Abdul Baset Wahedi (AFG)	2
Teerawat Pongsai (THA)	5
Lee Ka Wai (HKG)	0
Bashar Al-Najjar (JOR)	8

Bronze medals
Teerawat Pongsai (THA)	0
Hsu Wei-chun (TPE)	1^{H}
Bashar Al-Najjar (JOR)	2^{H}
Saadi Abbas Jalbani (PAK)	5
