= Karate at the 2010 Asian Games – Men's kumite 60 kg =

Karate competitions

Men's kumite 60 kg at the 2010 Asian Games
- Venue: Guangdong Gymnasium
- Date: 25 November 2010
- Competitors: 19 from 19 nations

Medalists
| gold medal | Darkhan Assadilov | Kazakhstan |
| silver medal | Bashar Al-Najjar | Jordan |
| bronze medal | Trần Minh Đức | Vietnam |
| bronze medal | Donny Dharmawan | Indonesia |

The men's kumite 60 kilograms competition at the 2010 Asian Games in Guangzhou, China was held on 25 November 2010 at the Guangdong Gymnasium.

== Schedule ==
All times are China Standard Time (UTC+08:00)

| Date | Time | Event |
|---|---|---|
| Thursday, 25 November 2010 | 09:30 | 1/16 finals |
| Thursday, 25 November 2010 | 09:30 | 1/8 finals |
| Thursday, 25 November 2010 | 09:30 | Quarterfinals |
| Thursday, 25 November 2010 | 09:30 | Semifinals |
| Thursday, 25 November 2010 | 09:30 | Repechage 1 |
| Thursday, 25 November 2010 | 09:30 | Repechage 2 |
| Thursday, 25 November 2010 | 09:30 | Bronze medal match |
| Thursday, 25 November 2010 | 09:30 | Final |

== Results ==
Legend

- H — Won by hansoku
- K — Won by kiken

=== Main bracket ===
==== Final ====
| Final |
| Darkhan Assadilov (KAZ) | 3 |
| Bashar Al-Najjar (JOR) | 0 |

==== Top half ====
1/16 finals
Abduqahhor Qahorov (TJK) | 0
Sayed Mohammad Amiri (AFG) | 1

1/8 finals
Abdullah Dalloul (QAT) | 2
Sayed Mohammad Amiri (AFG) | 4
Hsia Wen-huang (TPE) | 5^{H}
Xaysavath Oupalavanh (LAO) | 0
Darkhan Assadilov (KAZ) | 5
Trần Minh Đức (VIE) | 1
Amir Mehdizadeh (IRI) | 5
Gaurav Sindhiya (IND) | 1

Quarterfinals
Sayed Mohammad Amiri (AFG) | 1^{H}
Hsia Wen-huang (TPE) | 6
Darkhan Assadilov (KAZ) | 5
Amir Mehdizadeh (IRI) | 3

Semifinals
Sayed Mohammad Amiri (AFG)
Darkhan Assadilov (KAZ) | K

==== Bottom half ====
1/16 finals
Cheung Kwan Lok (HKG) | 2
Bashar Al-Najjar (JOR) | 5
Binod Maharjan (NEP) | 3
Mohd Fida'iy Hj Sanif (BRU) | 0

1/8 finals
Donny Dharmawan (INA) | 5
Bashar Al-Najjar (JOR) | 7
Orwa Abo-Hableh (SYR) | 0
Dong Mingming (CHN) | 1
Ulugbek Mukhsimov (UZB) | 4
Md Zahurul Islam (BAN) | 0
Binod Maharjan (NEP) | 4
Talantbek Khalmurzaev (KGZ) | 2

Quarterfinals
Bashar Al-Najjar (JOR) | 1
Dong Mingming (CHN) | 0
Ulugbek Mukhsimov (UZB) | 3
Binod Maharjan (NEP) | 0

Semifinals
Bashar Al-Najjar (JOR) | 5
Ulugbek Mukhsimov (UZB) | 0

=== Repechage ===
Repechage 1
Cheung Kwan Lok (HKG) | 3
Donny Dharmawan (INA) | 4

Repechage 2
Trần Minh Đức (VIE) | 9
Amir Mehdizadeh (IRI) | 6
Donny Dharmawan (INA) | 7
Dong Mingming (CHN) | 2

Bronze medal match
Trần Minh Đức (VIE) | K
Sayed Mohammad Amiri (AFG)
Donny Dharmawan (INA) | 5
Ulugbek Mukhsimov (UZB) | 2
