= Karate at the 2018 Asian Games – Men's kumite 67 kg =

Karate competition

Men's kumite 67 kg at the 2018 Asian Games
- Venue: Jakarta Convention Center
- Date: 26 August 2018
- Competitors: 24 from 24 nations

Medalists
gold medal	Ali Al-Shatti	Kuwait
silver medal	Didar Amirali	Kazakhstan
bronze medal	Abdelrahman Al-Masatfa	Jordan
bronze medal	Jintar Simanjuntak	Indonesia

The men's kumite 67 kilograms competition at the 2018 Asian Games took place on 26 August 2018 at Jakarta Convention Center Plenary Hall, Jakarta, Indonesia.

== Schedule ==
All times are Western Indonesia Time (UTC+07:00)

Date	Time	Event
Sunday, 26 August 2018	14:00	1/16 finals
Sunday, 26 August 2018	14:00	1/8 finals
Sunday, 26 August 2018	14:00	Quarterfinals
Sunday, 26 August 2018	14:00	Semifinals
Sunday, 26 August 2018	14:00	Repechage round 1
Sunday, 26 August 2018	14:00	Final of repechage
Sunday, 26 August 2018	17:00	Finals

== Results ==
Legend

- K — Won by kiken (8–0)

=== Main bracket ===
==== Final ====
Final
Ali Al-Shatti (KUW)	4
Didar Amirali (KAZ)	0

==== Top half ====
1/16 finals
Fahad Al-Khathami (KSA)	4
Ikboljon Uzakov (UZB)	1
Mostafa Rezaee (AFG)	2
Tang Wei-chieh (TPE)	6
Wang Zhiwei (CHN)	2
Urmatbek Abdilaev (KGZ)	2
Fidelis Soares (TLS)	0
Abdelrahman Al-Masatfa (JOR)	8

1/8 finals
Fahad Al-Khathami (KSA)	3
Naseer Ahmed (PAK)	1
Tang Wei-chieh (TPE)	0
Ali Al-Shatti (KUW)	3
Wang Zhiwei (CHN)	8
Tögsjargalyn Tümendemberel (MGL)	0
Abdelrahman Al-Masatfa (JOR)	2
Ahmed Garfan (YEM)	0

Quarterfinals
Fahad Al-Khathami (KSA)	0
Ali Al-Shatti (KUW)	4^{K}
Wang Zhiwei (CHN)	1
Abdelrahman Al-Masatfa (JOR)	2

Semifinals
Ali Al-Shatti (KUW)	5
Abdelrahman Al-Masatfa (JOR)	2

==== Bottom half ====
1/16 finals
Didar Amirali (KAZ)	5
Ahmed Al-Hadhrami (UAE)	4
Bijay Lama (NEP)	0
Hiroto Shinohara (JPN)	1
Motaz Daraghma (PLE)	9
Ly Rathanaksambath (CAM)	0
Jintar Simanjuntak (INA)	1
Nguyễn Thanh Duy (VIE)	0

1/8 finals
Didar Amirali (KAZ)	1
Supa Ngamphuengphit (THA)	0
Hiroto Shinohara (JPN)	2
Akihiro Lokukaluge (SRI)	6
Motaz Daraghma (PLE)	0
Lee Ji-hwan (KOR)	1
Jintar Simanjuntak (INA)	3
Radzhabbek Rakhimov (TJK)	0

Quarterfinals
Didar Amirali (KAZ)	10
Akihiro Lokukaluge (SRI)	0
Lee Ji-hwan (KOR)	0
Jintar Simanjuntak (INA)	1

Semifinals
Didar Amirali (KAZ)	8
Jintar Simanjuntak (INA)	0

=== Repechage ===
Repechage round 1
Ahmed Al-Hadhrami (UAE)	4
Supa Ngamphuengphit (THA)	3

Final of repechage
Tang Wei-chieh (TPE)	K
Fahad Al-Khathami (KSA)
Ahmed Al-Hadhrami (UAE)	5
Akihiro Lokukaluge (SRI)	1

Bronze medals
Tang Wei-chieh (TPE)	1
Abdelrahman Al-Masatfa (JOR)	9
Ahmed Al-Hadhrami (UAE)	0
Jintar Simanjuntak (INA)	1
