= Kayo Someya =

Japanese karateka (born 1991)

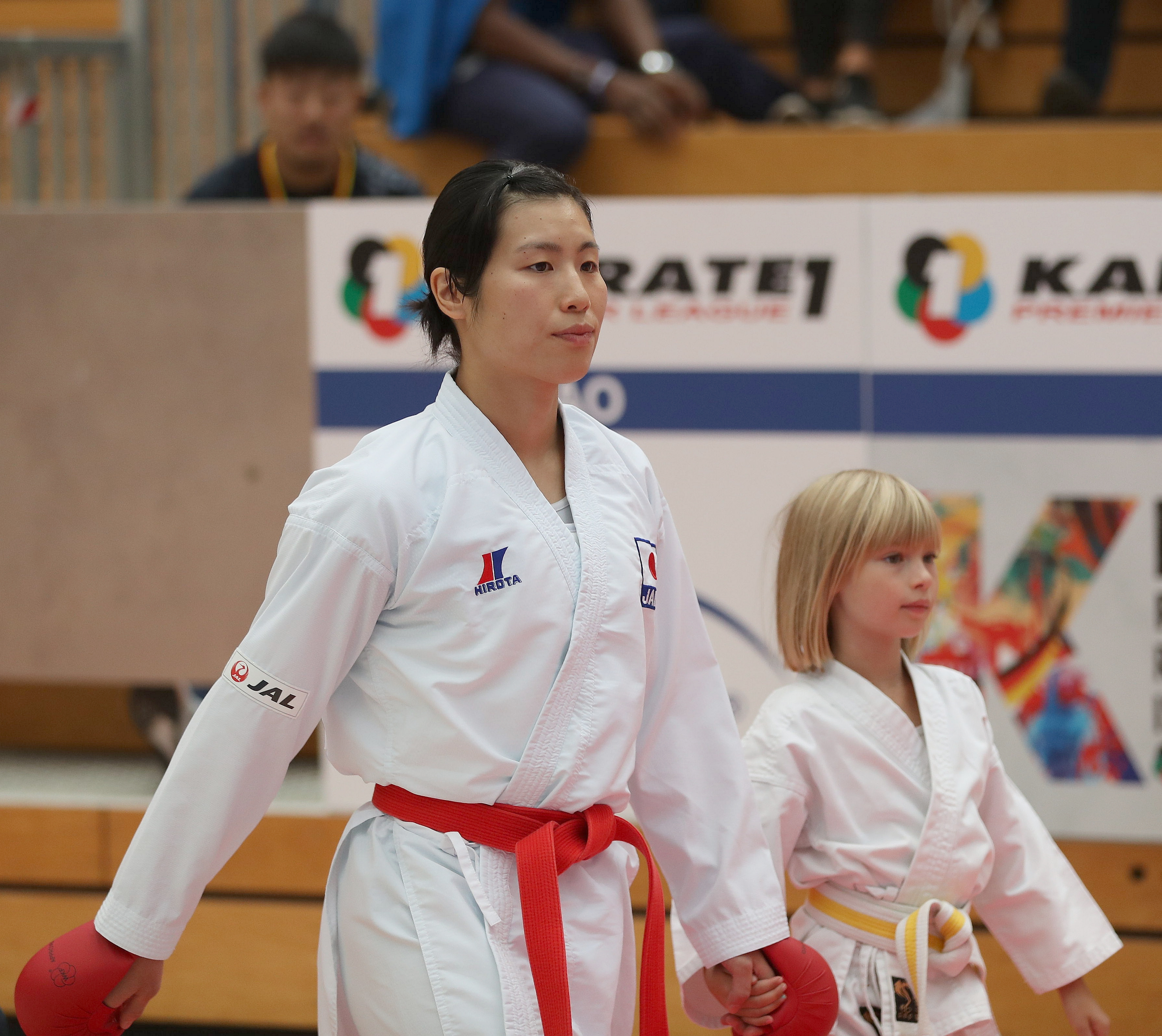
- Someya in 2018

Personal information
- Born: 14 May 1991 (age 35)

Sport
- Country: Japan
- Sport: Karate
- Weight class: 68 kg
- Events: Kumite; Team kumite
Medal record
Women's karate
Representing Japan
World Championships
Gold medal – first place	2012 Paris	Kumite 68 kg
Bronze medal – third place	2012 Paris	Team kumite
Asian Championships
Gold medal – first place	2015 Yokohama	Kumite 68 kg
Gold medal – first place	2017 Astana	Kumite 68 kg
Gold medal – first place	2018 Amman	Kumite 68 kg
Gold medal – first place	2021 Almaty	Kumite 68 kg
Gold medal – first place	2022 Tashkent	Kumite 68 kg
Silver medal – second place	2019 Tashkent	Kumite 68 kg
Bronze medal – third place	2013 Dubai	Kumite 68 kg
Bronze medal – third place	2017 Astana	Team kumite
Bronze medal – third place	2021 Almaty	Team kumite
World Games
Gold medal – first place	2013 Cali	Kumite 68 kg
Bronze medal – third place	2017 Wrocław	Kumite 68 kg
Asian Games
Bronze medal – third place	2018 Jakarta	Kumite 68 kg

Kayo Someya (born 14 May 1991) is a Japanese karateka. She is the 2012 World Champion in the women's kumite 68 kg event and a five-time gold medalist in this event at the Asian Karate Championships.

== Career ==
Someya represented Japan at the 2013 World Games held in Cali, Colombia and she won the gold medal in the women's kumite 68 kg event.

At the 2017 World Games held in Wrocław, Poland, Someya won the bronze medal in the women's kumite 68 kg event.

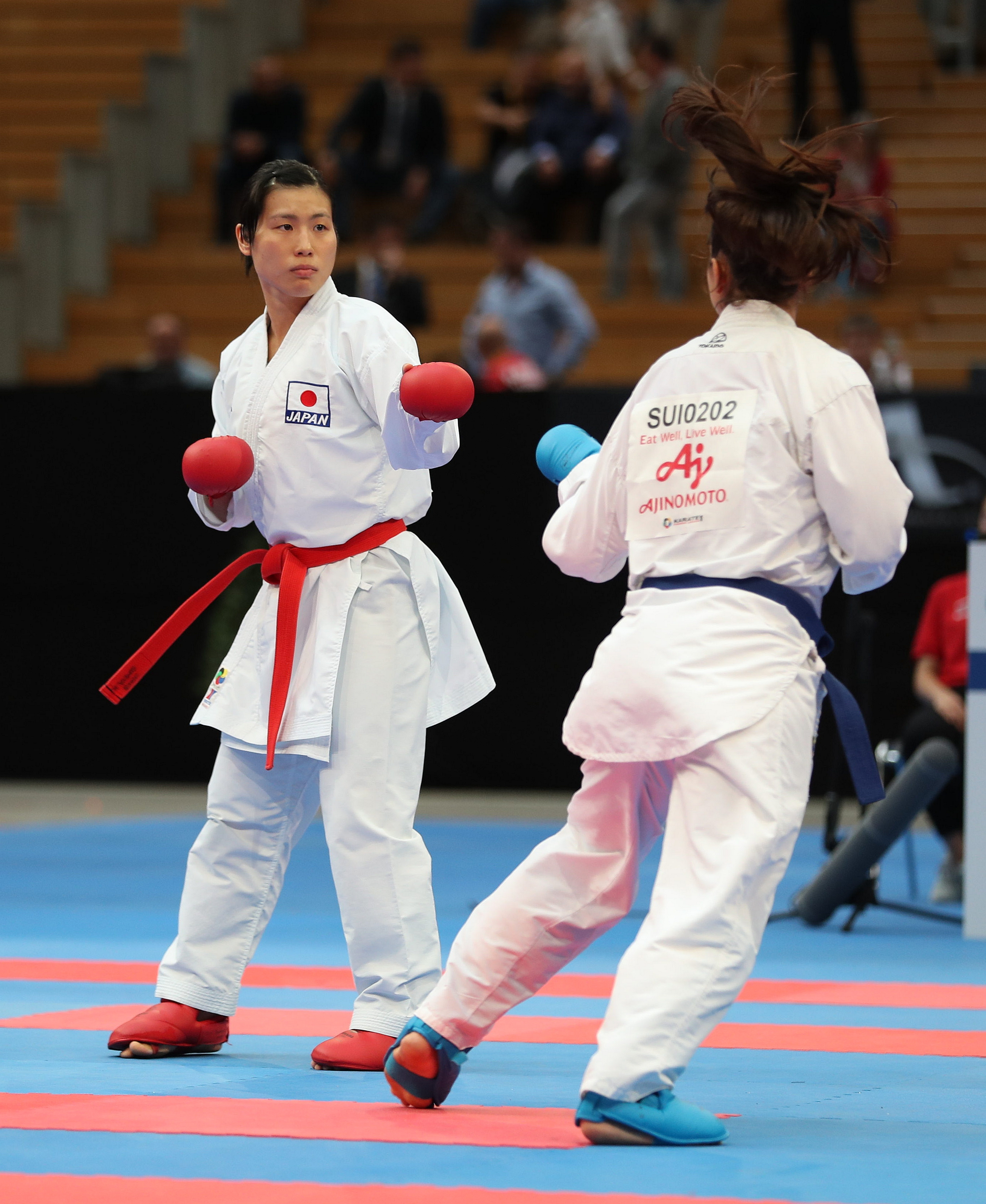
Someya at K1PL 2018 in Berlin

At the 2018 Asian Karate Championships held in Amman, Jordan, Someya won the gold medal in the women's kumite 68 kg event. A month later, she won one of the bronze medals in the women's kumite 68 kg event at the Asian Games held in Jakarta, Indonesia. In her bronze medal match she defeated Chao Jou of Taiwan.

At the 2019 Asian Karate Championships held in Tashkent, Uzbekistan, Someya won one of the bronze medals in the women's kumite 68 kg event. This became the silver medal after a confirmed doping violation of Nodira Djumaniyazova of Uzbekistan, the original gold medalist.

In 2021, Someya competed in the women's 68 kg event at the World Karate Championships held in Dubai, United Arab Emirates. A month later, she won the gold medal in her event at the Asian Karate Championships held in Almaty, Kazakhstan. She also won one of the bronze medals in the women's team kumite event.

== Personal life ==
She is the older sister of Mayumi Someya, also a karateka and a colleague of Japan's national karate team.

== Achievements ==
Year	Competition	Venue	Rank	Event
2012	World Championships	Paris, France	1st	Kumite 68 kg
2012	World Championships	Paris, France	3rd	Team kumite
2013	World Games	Cali, Colombia	1st	Kumite 68 kg
2013	Asian Championships	Dubai, United Arab Emirates	3rd	Kumite 68 kg
2015	Asian Championships	Yokohama, Japan	1st	Kumite 68 kg
2017	Asian Championships	Astana, Kazakhstan	1st	Kumite 68 kg
2017	Asian Championships	Astana, Kazakhstan	3rd	Team kumite
2017	World Games	Wrocław, Poland	3rd	Kumite 68 kg
2018	Asian Championships	Amman, Jordan	1st	Kumite 68 kg
2018	Asian Games	Jakarta, Indonesia	3rd	Kumite 68 kg
2019	Asian Championships	Tashkent, Uzbekistan	2nd	Kumite 68 kg
2021	Asian Championships	Almaty, Kazakhstan	1st	Kumite 68 kg
2021	Asian Championships	Almaty, Kazakhstan	3rd	Team kumite
2022	Asian Championships	Tashkent, Uzbekistan	1st	Kumite 68 kg
