= Thomas Scott (karateka) =

American karateka (born 1990)

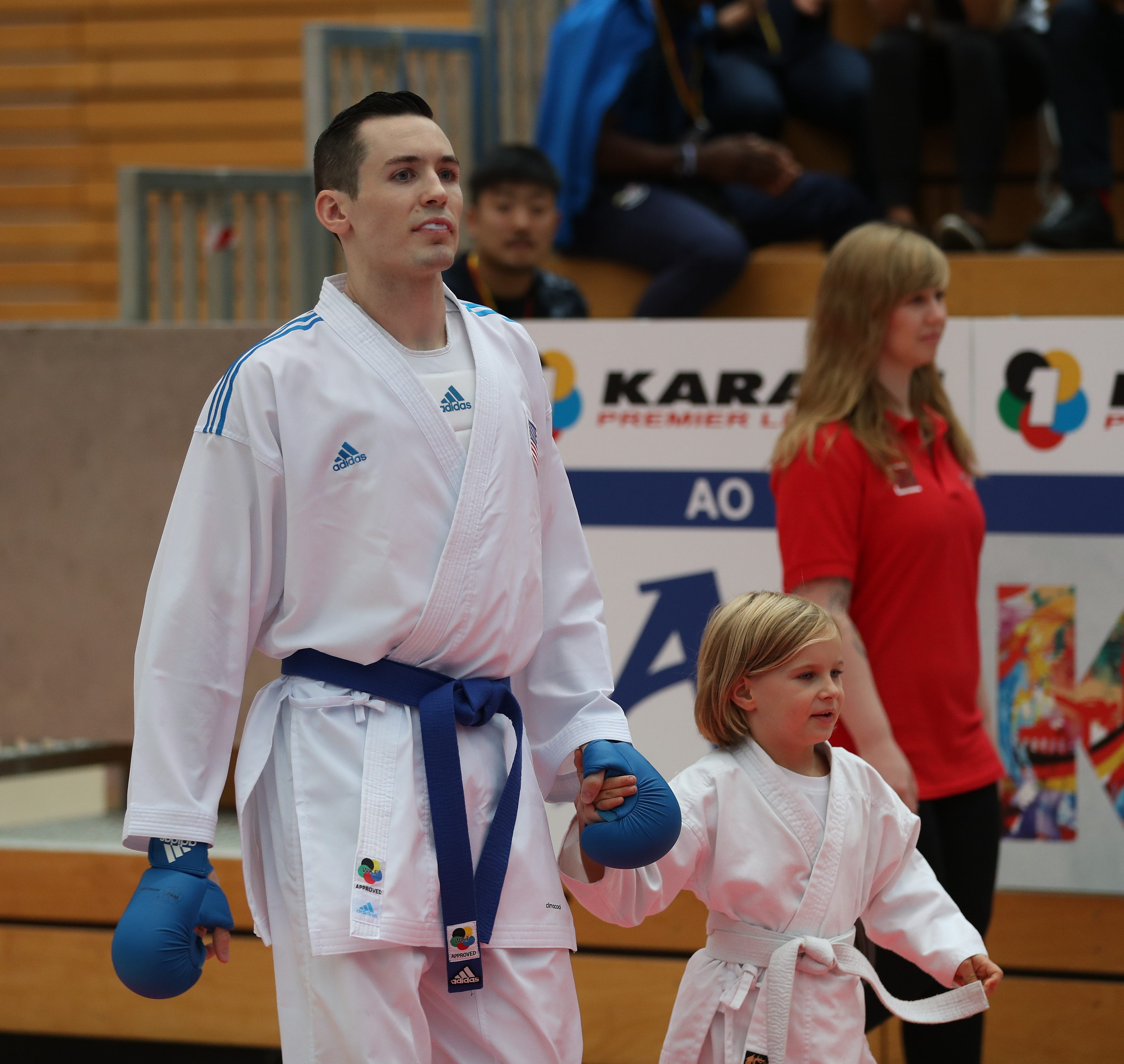
- Thomas Scott in 2018

Personal information
- Born: January 9, 1990 (age 36) Richardson, Texas, U.S.
- Education: Texas Christian University University of Texas at Dallas
- Height: 6 ft 0 in (183 cm)
- Weight: 164 lb (74 kg)
- Life partner: Morgan Scott

Sport
- Country: United States
- Sport: Karate
- Weight class: 75 kg
- Event: Kumite
- Club: Academy of Classical Karate - Plano
- Coached by: Brody Burns
Medal record
Men's karate
Representing United States
World Championships
Bronze medal – third place	2021 Dubai	Kumite 75 kg
Pan American Games
Gold medal – first place	2015 Toronto	Kumite 75 kg
Gold medal – first place	2019 Lima	Kumite 75 kg
Gold medal – first place	2023 Santiago	Kumite 75 kg
Silver medal – second place	2011 Guadalajara	Kumite 75 kg

Thomas Scott (born January 9, 1990) is an American karateka. He won one of the bronze medals in the men's 75 kg event at the 2021 World Karate Championships held in Dubai, United Arab Emirates. He is also a three-time gold medalist in the men's 75 kg event at the Pan American Games (2015, 2019, 2023). He won the silver medal in this event at the 2011 Pan American Games.

He represented the United States at the 2020 Summer Olympics in Tokyo, Japan. He competed in the men's 75 kg event, where he did not advance to compete in the semifinals.

== Career ==
In 2017, Scott lost his bronze medal match in the men's kumite 75 kg event at the World Games held in Wrocław, Poland.

In June 2021, Scott competed at the World Olympic Qualification Tournament held in Paris, France, hoping to qualify for the 2020 Summer Olympics in Tokyo, Japan, and he did not qualify at this tournament, but he was able to qualify via reallocation of a vacant spot in the Male Kumite – 75 kg category. In August, he competed in the men's 75 kg event at the Olympics. In November, he won one of the bronze medals in the men's 75 kg event at the 2021 World Karate Championships held in Dubai, United Arab Emirates. In his bronze medal match he defeated Eren Akkurt of Turkey.

Scott lost his bronze medal match in the men's kumite 75 kg event at the 2022 World Games held in Birmingham, United States.

== Achievements ==
Year	Competition	Venue	Rank	Event
2011	Pan American Games	Guadalajara, Mexico	2nd	Kumite 75 kg
2015	Pan American Games	Toronto, Canada	1st	Kumite 75 kg
2019	Pan American Games	Lima, Peru	1st	Kumite 75 kg
2021	World Championships	Dubai, United Arab Emirates	3rd	Kumite 75 kg
2023	Pan American Games	Santiago, Chile	1st	Kumite 75 kg
