= Hsu Wei-chun =

Taiwanese karateka (born 1991)

Personal information
- Born: 25 November 1991 (age 34)

Sport
- Country: Chinese Taipei
- Sport: Karate
- Weight class: 75 kg
- Event: Kumite
Medal record
Men's karate
Representing Chinese Taipei
Asian Games
Bronze medal – third place	2018 Jakarta	Kumite 75 kg
Asian Championships
Silver medal – second place	2017 Astana	Kumite 75 kg

Hsu Wei-chun (born 25 November 1991) is a Taiwanese karateka. He won one of the bronze medals in the men's kumite 75 kg event at the 2018 Asian Games held in Jakarta, Indonesia.

At the 2017 Asian Karate Championships held in Astana, Kazakhstan, he won the silver medal in the men's kumite 75 kg event. In the final, he lost against Bahman Asgari of Iran.

In 2021, he competed at the World Olympic Qualification Tournament held in Paris, France hoping to qualify for the 2020 Summer Olympics in Tokyo, Japan.

He competed in the men's kumite 75 kg event at the 2022 World Games held in Birmingham, United States. He was eliminated in the elimination round and he did not advance to the semi-finals.

== Achievements ==
Year	Competition	Venue	Rank	Event
2017	Asian Championships	Astana, Kazakhstan	2nd	Kumite 75 kg
2018	Asian Games	Jakarta, Indonesia	3rd	Kumite 75 kg
