= Sabari Karthik =

Indian martial artist (born 1990)

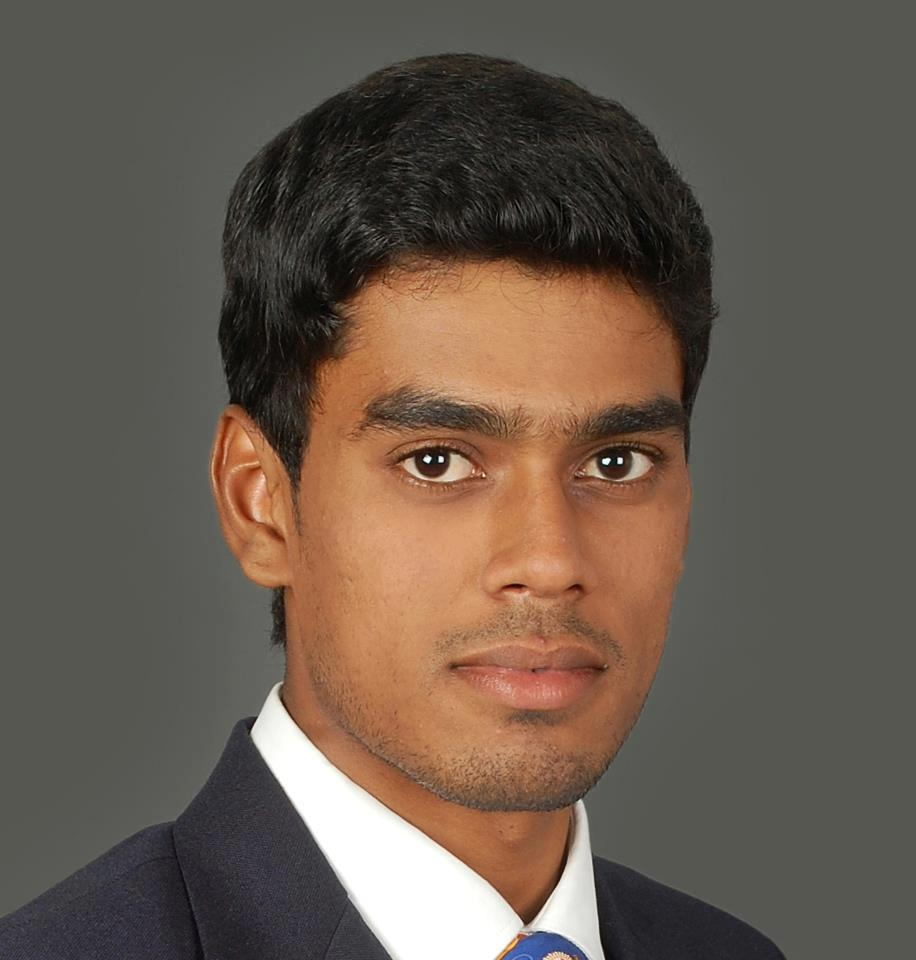
- Born: 30 March 1990 (age 36); Coimbatore, India

Sabari Karthik
Medal record

Representing India

Men's Karate
Gold medal – first place	International Junior Karate Championship	Kumite
Silver medal – second place	Malaysian Open	Kumite
Silver medal – second place	1st South Asian karate championship	Kumite
Bronze medal – third place	1st South Asian karate championship	Kumite

Sabari Karthik (born 30 March 1990) is an Indian karateka. He has represented India in international karate tournaments, including the 16th 2010 Asian Games in China, the Malaysian Open (silver medal), and the first South Asian championship in Delhi.

== Early life ==
Sabari Karthik was born on 30 March 1990, in Coimbatore, India, to Gunasekaran and Geetha Kumari. His father was a policeman who died when Sabari was 11 years old. He did his school education in Coimbatore. Sabari started training in Zen martial arts academy by coach Sensei N. Karthikeyan. He has won awards at district, state and national levels, before he earned his first international outing in Philippines in 2005 at 15 and World Karate Championship in 2007 As a member of the Indian national team, he trained under coaches from Iran, Spain, and Malaysia.

== Achievements ==
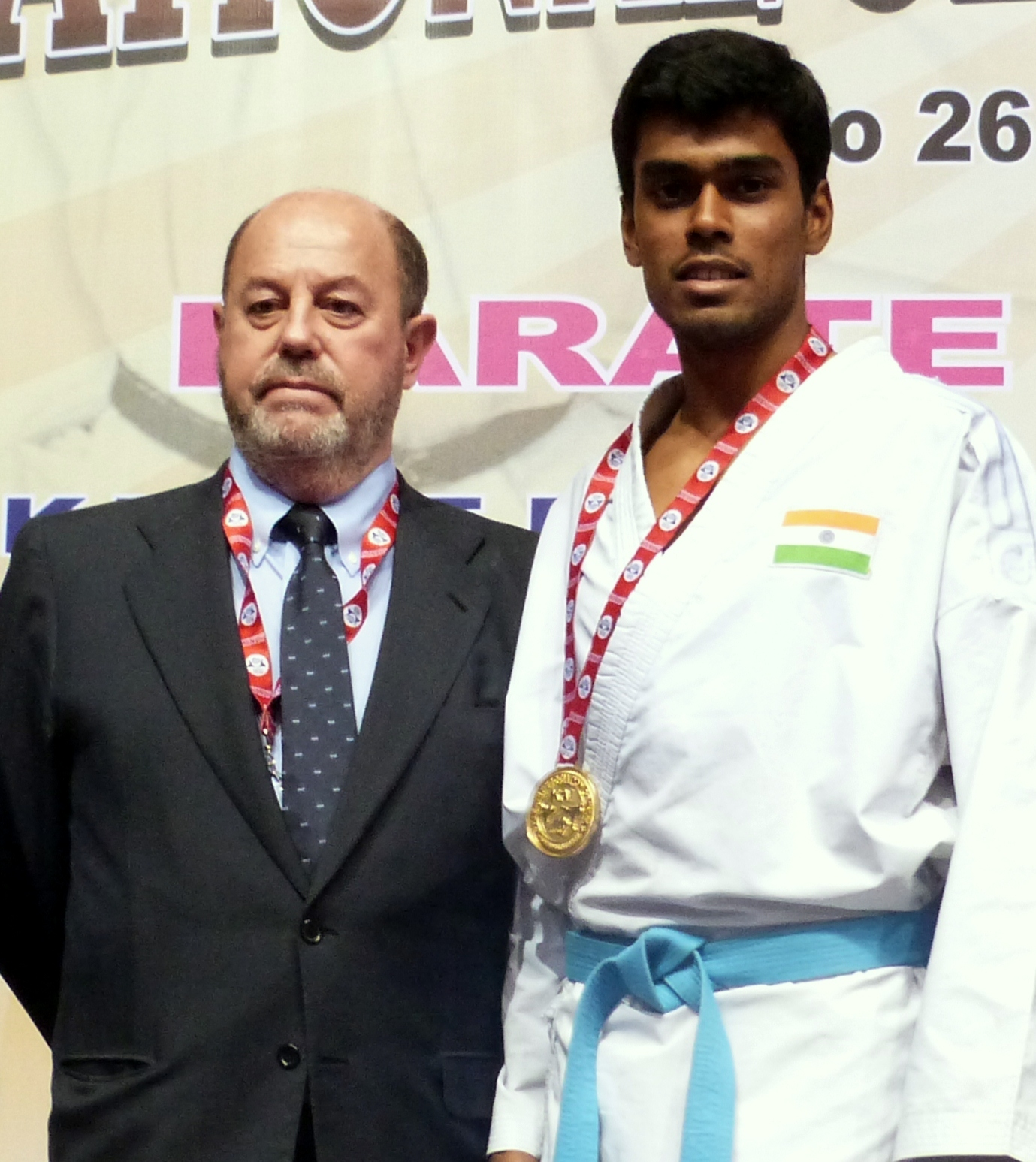
Sabari karthik with the WKF President Antonio Espinos During National Championship medal ceremony

Sabari Karthik won his first international gold medal in the International Junior Karate Championship, held in Singapore, 4 July 2009. He then went on to clinch a silver and a bronze medal in the first South Asian karate championship, held in Delhi. He has then won a silver medal in the Malaysian Open, held in Malaysia.

== Career statistics ==
Event	Year	Result
(Philippines) 13th KOI Karate World Cup	2004	Participation
(Turkey) 5th World cadet & Junior Karate Championship	2007	Participation
(Singapore) International Junior Karate Championship	2010	Gold
(Chile) 16th Asian Games	2010	Participation
(Serbia) 20th World Karate championship	2010	Participation
(Malaysia) Malaysian Open	2011	Silver
(Chile) 10th Senior Asian karate Championship	2011	Participation
(India) 1st South Asian karate championship	2011	Silver, Bronze
(France) 21st World Karate Championship	2012	Participation
(India) 34th National Games	2011	Gold
(India) 24th National Karate Championship, New Delhi	2012	Gold
