= Bashar Al-Najjar =

Jordanian karateka (born 1991)

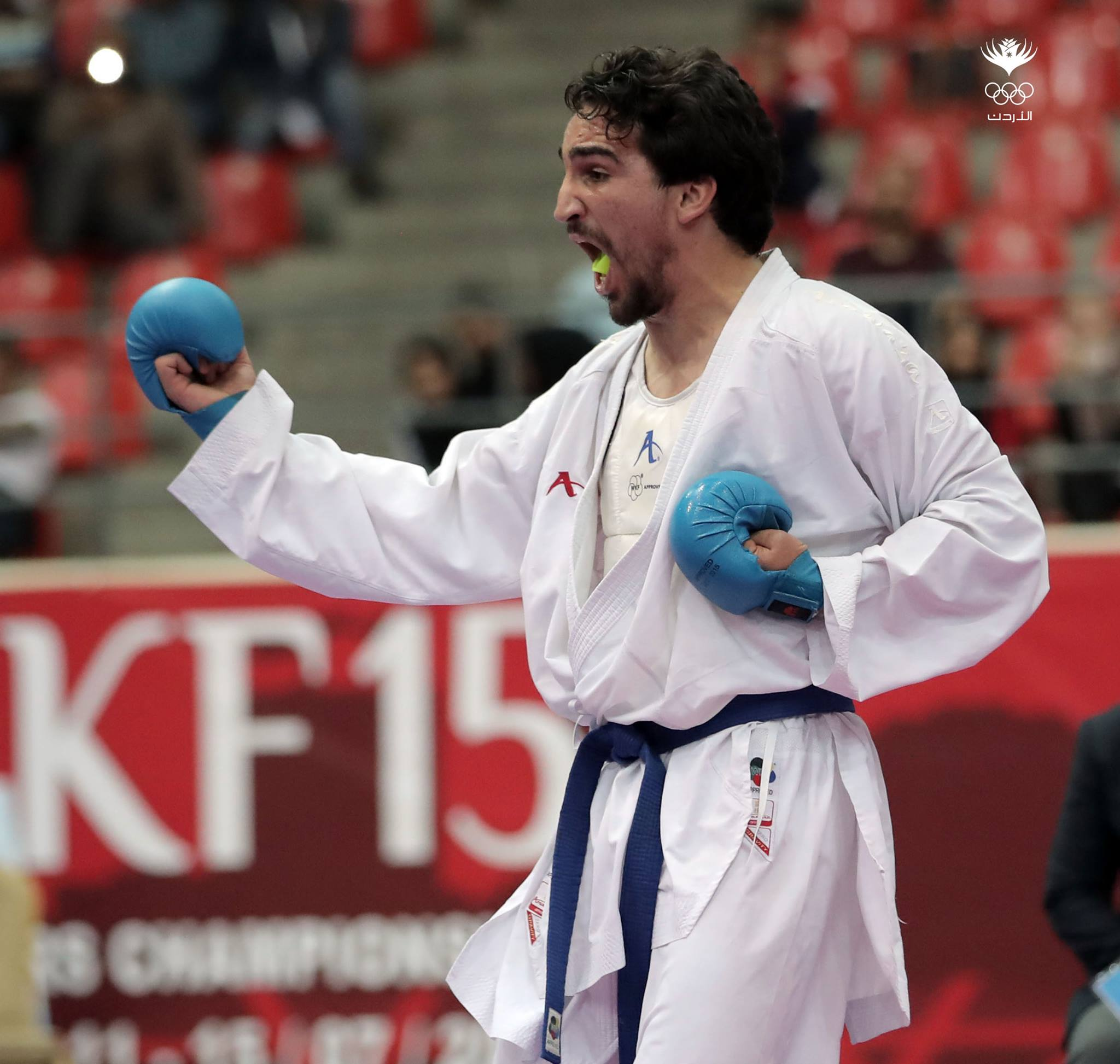

Personal information
- Born: 1 November 1991 (age 34)

Sport
- Country: Jordan
- Sport: Karate
- Event: Kumite
Medal record
Men's karate
Representing Jordan
Asian Games
Silver medal – second place	2010 Guangzhou	Kumite 60 kg
Bronze medal – third place	2018 Jakarta	Kumite 75 kg
Asian Karate Championships
Gold medal – first place	2018 Amman	Kumite 75 kg
Bronze medal – third place	2013 Dubai	Team kumite
Islamic Solidarity Games
Gold medal – first place	2017 Baku	Kumite 67 kg

Bashar Al-Najjar (born 1 November 1991) is a Jordanian karateka. He won the gold medal in the men's kumite 67 kg event at the 2017 Islamic Solidarity Games held in Baku, Azerbaijan. He is also a gold medalist at the Asian Karate Championships and a two-time medalist at the Asian Games.

== Career ==
In 2010, he won the silver medal in the men's kumite 60 kg event at the Asian Games held in Guangzhou, China. Four years later, he lost his bronze medal match in the men's kumite 67 kg event at the 2014 Asian Games in Incheon, South Korea. In 2018, he won one of the bronze medals in the men's kumite 75 kg event at the Asian Games held in Jakarta, Indonesia.

In 2021, he competed at the World Olympic Qualification Tournament held in Paris, France hoping to qualify for the 2020 Summer Olympics in Tokyo, Japan.

== Achievements ==
Year	Competition	Venue	Rank	Event
2010	Asian Games	Guangzhou, China	2nd	Kumite 60 kg
2013	Asian Championships	Dubai, United Arab Emirates	3rd	Team kumite
2017	Islamic Solidarity Games	Baku, Azerbaijan	1st	Kumite 67 kg
2018	Asian Games	Jakarta, Indonesia	3rd	Kumite 75 kg
2018	Asian Championships	Amman, Jordan	1st	Kumite 75 kg
