= Nasrin Dousti =

Iranian karateka (born 1988)

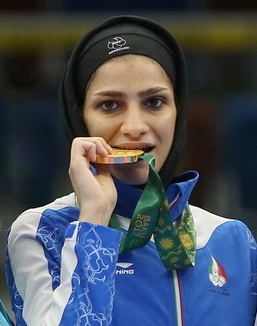
- Dousti at the 2017 Islamic Solidarity Games
- Born: 19 December 1988 (age 37)
- Height: 167 cm (5 ft 6 in)
- Division: -50 kg
- Style: Karate, kumite
- Trainer: Fariba Bodaghi

Nasrin Dousti (Persian: نسرین دوستی, also Romanized as "Nasrīn Dūstī"; born 19 December 1988) is an Iranian karateka, who competes in the kumite -50 kg division. She won a gold medal at the 2012 Asian Karate Championships and a bronze at the 2014 Asian Games. Her sister Delaram is also an international karate competitor.
