= Karate at the 2014 Asian Games – Men's kumite 67 kg =

Karate competition

Men's kumite 67 kg at the 2014 Asian Games
- Venue: Gyeyang Gymnasium
- Date: 2 October 2014
- Competitors: 20 from 20 nations

Medalists
gold medal	Hiroto Shinohara	Japan
silver medal	Rinat Sagandykov	Kazakhstan
bronze medal	Kim Do-won	South Korea
bronze medal	Ali Al-Shatti	Kuwait

The men's kumite 67 kilograms competition at the 2014 Asian Games in Incheon, South Korea was held on 2 October 2014 at the Gyeyang Gymnasium.

== Schedule ==
All times are Korea Standard Time (UTC+09:00)

Date	Time	Event
Thursday, 2 October 2014	13:30	1/16 finals
Thursday, 2 October 2014	13:30	1/8 finals
Thursday, 2 October 2014	13:30	Quarterfinals
Thursday, 2 October 2014	13:30	Semifinals
Thursday, 2 October 2014	13:30	Repechage 1
Thursday, 2 October 2014	13:30	Final of repechage
Thursday, 2 October 2014	15:40	Finals

== Results ==
=== Main bracket ===
==== Final ====
Final
Hiroto Shinohara (JPN)	3
Rinat Sagandykov (KAZ)	2

==== Top half ====
1/16 finals
Bakai Duisheev (KGZ)	0
Hiroto Shinohara (JPN)	1
Supa Ngamphuengphit (THA)	3
Fahad Al-Khathami (KSA)	6

1/8 finals
Hiroto Shinohara (JPN)	3
Kim Do-won (KOR)	2
Jintar Simanjuntak (INA)	6
Kang Song-ji (PRK)	0
Fahad Al-Khathami (KSA)	0
Pang Iat Long (MAC)	7
Saadi Abbas Jalbani (PAK)	4
Saleh Al-Radaei (YEM)	1

Quarterfinals
Hiroto Shinohara (JPN)	1
Jintar Simanjuntak (INA)	0
Pang Iat Long (MAC)	5
Saadi Abbas Jalbani (PAK)	1

Semifinals
Hiroto Shinohara (JPN)	1
Pang Iat Long (MAC)	0

==== Bottom half ====
1/16 finals
Bashar Al-Najjar (JOR)	0
Rinat Sagandykov (KAZ)	1
Ali Al-Shatti (KUW)	5
Nguyễn Văn Nhật (VIE)	2

1/8 finals
Rinat Sagandykov (KAZ)	8
Qassim Ghavidel (QAT)	0
Mukundra Maharjan (NEP)	9
Sapadurdy Setdarow (TKM)	1
Ali Al-Shatti (KUW)	3
Hossein Samandar (IRI)	3
Sharmendran Raghonathan (MAS)	4
Mukhammadzaid Iminov (UZB)	0

Quarterfinals
Rinat Sagandykov (KAZ)	6
Mukundra Maharjan (NEP)	0
Ali Al-Shatti (KUW)	7
Sharmendran Raghonathan (MAS)	2

Semifinals
Rinat Sagandykov (KAZ)	4
Ali Al-Shatti (KUW)	0

=== Repechage ===
Repechage 1
Bakai Duisheev (KGZ)	2
Kim Do-won (KOR)	7
Bashar Al-Najjar (JOR)	1
Qassim Ghavidel (QAT)	1

Final of repechage
Kim Do-won (KOR)	2
Jintar Simanjuntak (INA)	1
Bashar Al-Najjar (JOR)	2
Mukundra Maharjan (NEP)	1

Bronze medal contest
Kim Do-won (KOR)	6
Pang Iat Long (MAC)	1
Bashar Al-Najjar (JOR)	1
Ali Al-Shatti (KUW)	4
