= Hala Al-Qadi =

Personal information
- Native name: حلا القاضي
- Nationality: Palestinian
- Born: Deir Istiya, West Bank, Palestine
- Education: Birzeit University

Sport
- Country: Palestine
- Sport: Karate
- Event: Kumite −68 kg
Medal record
Representing Palestine
Asian Games
Bronze medal – third place	2022 Hangzhou	Kumite −68 kg
Arab Games
Silver medal – second place	2023 Algeria	Kumite −68 kg
West Asia Karate Championship
Gold medal – first place	2025 Amman	Kumite −68 kg
Silver medal – second place	2023 Amman	Kumite −68 kg
International tournaments
Gold medal – first place	2019 Istanbul Open	Kumite −68 kg
Asian Karate Championship
Bronze medal – third place	2021 Almaty	Women's Under-21 −61 kg)

Hala Al-Qadi (Arabic: حلا القاضي) is a Palestinian karateka. She participates in the women’s kumite −68 kg category. She was widely recognized after winning a bronze medal at the 2022 Asian Games in Hangzhou, making her the first Palestinian woman to win a medal at the Asian Games.

== Early life ==
Hala Al-Qadi was born in Deir Istiya in the Palestinian West Bank. She started practicing karate at the age 7, initially as a hobby and to spend summer vacations. She moved up through the ranks from local, regional, and finally to international competitions for Palestine. She is a member of the Palestinian national karate team.

Al-Qadi is currently completing her bachelor’s degree in civil engineering at Birzeit University in the West Bank.

== Career ==
Before Al-Qadi's victory at the Asian Games, she won medals from a number of regional championships, such as the Asian Karate Championship.

In February 2019, Al-Qadi won a gold medal at the West Asia Karate Championship in Sharjah, United Arab Emirates. In September 2019, Al-Qadi won gold in Istanbul Karate Championship competing against athletes from around 40 countries.

In 2023, she earned a silver medal at the Arab Games in Algeria in the women’s kumite −68 kg category.

== Asian Games medal ==
At the 2022 Asian Games held in Hangzhou, China, She won the bronze medal in the Woman’s kumite-68 kilograms (150 lb) category. In the bronze medal match, she beat Chao Jou of Chinese Taipei with a score of 6-3.

She is the first Palestinian woman and the second Palestinian citizen after Munir Abu-Keshek to win an Asian Games medal.

== Later recognition and roles ==
In 2025, Hala Al-Qadi was elected to the Athletes Committee of the Islamic Solidarity Sports Association.

The Palestinian Olympic Committee nominated Al-Qadi in recognition of her achievements and contributions to women’s sports in Palestine.
