= Kushal Shrestha =

Nepalese karate player

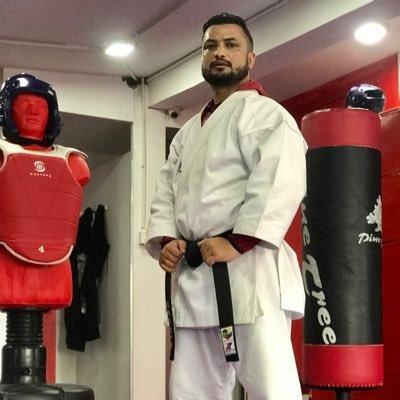
- Kushal Shrestha Karate Player

Personal information
- Native name: कुशल श्रेष्ठ
- Nationality: Nepali
- Born: 17 August 1982 (age 43) Dhankuta, Koshi Province, Nepal
- Spouse: Tara Gurung
- Website: https://kushalshrestha.com.np/

Sport
- Country: Nepal
- Sport: Karate
- Now coaching: Nepali National Karate Team

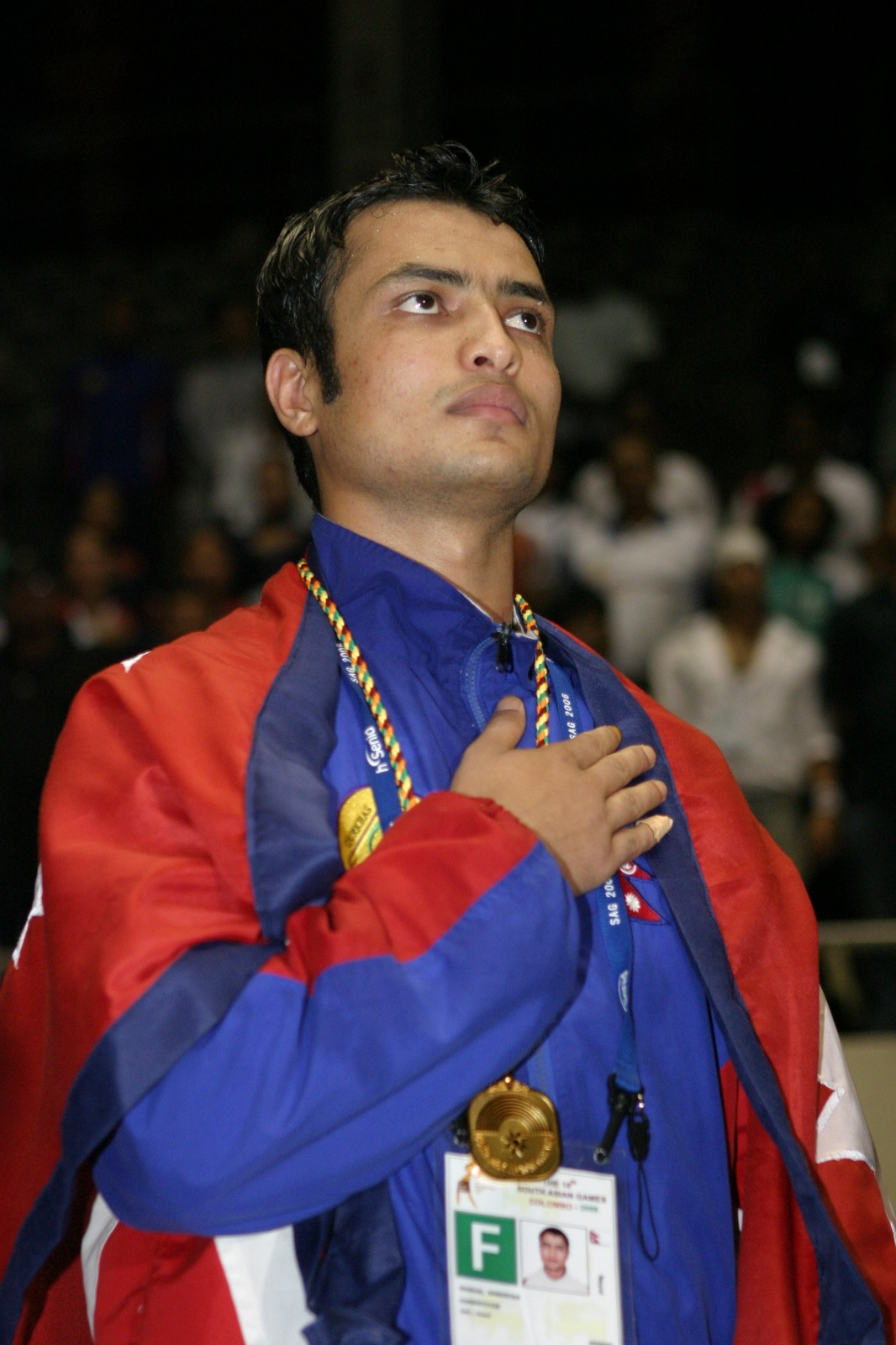
Moment after winning gold medal in 10th South Asian Games.

Kushal Shrestha (Nepali: कुशल श्रेष्ठ; born August 17, 1982) is a former Nepalese Karate player and the National Karate Team's head coach. He was born in Dhankuta, Koshi Province, Nepal. Currently, he is preparing the Nepali National Karate Team as a head coach for the 19th Asian Games, which are going to be held in China from September 23 to October 8, 2023.

He is the most popular player and coach in the history of Nepalese Karate. He started his career at the age of 8. Now, he holds a black belt at the World Shotokan Karate Academy RyuKyu 6th Dan (Godan) from Sweden. He represents Nepal in various Karate tournaments across the globe. Notable participation was the 10th South Asian Games held in Sri Lanka, winning a gold with one silver and two bronze medals.

== International Karate Awards ==
Competition	Awards	Year
Malaysia-Nepal Karate Friendly Championship Malaysia	Bronze Medal	2006
9th south Asian Games, Pakistan	Silver Medal	2004
10th South Asian Games, Sri Lanka	Gold Medal	2006
11th South Asian Games, Bangladesh (Team Kata and Individual Fight)	2 Bronze Medal	2010
The 11th All Bangladesh Milkvita dragon karate open championship-2006	Gold Medal	2006
AMA International Karate Open Championship, England	Silver Medal	2007
Shukokai Open Karate Championship 2016- 7th Feb 2016, Melbourne Australia	Silver Medal	2016

== Awards and recognition ==
Awards	Year
Prabal Gorkha Dakshin Bahu 4th by his Majesty King Gyanendra Bir Bikram Shah Dev On 2061.	2004
Player of the year 2063 by National and International player association.	2005/2006
Player of the year 2064 by National and International player association.	2006/2007
Dhankuta Prativa Puraskar 2007 by Dhankuta Prativa Puraskar Kosh Dhankuta UK chapter.	2007
Sikshya Diwas padak 2064 By Education Ministry.	2007
Certificate of Appreciation from JAAN ( Jica Alumni association of Nepal).	2010
Appreciation from National Reference Laboratory for Gold Medal In 10th Sag Game.	2006
Honor From Dhankuta Prativa Puraskar Kosh in England (UK) for participation in International Karate Championship in Uk from Nepal.	2009
Letter of Appreciation from G.P. Koirala Center for bronze medal in 11th Sag Games In Bangladesh from Prime Minister Ms. Sujata Koirala.	2011
Letter of Appreciation from Nepal Karate Federation for bronze medal in 11th Sag Games In Bangladesh.	2011
Honor From NRN Of Canada From Honorable Nepalese Ambassador Dr. Bhoj Raj Ghimire at Moments of 6th National Convention, Mississauga, Canada-June 29–39	2013
Honor From Laligurans Club Of Canada.	2013
Honor From NRNA Of Australia.	2016
Honor From NINFA( Nepalese Indigenous Nationalities Forum, Australia ) Of Australia From Honorable Nepalese Ambassador Lucky Sherpa.	2017

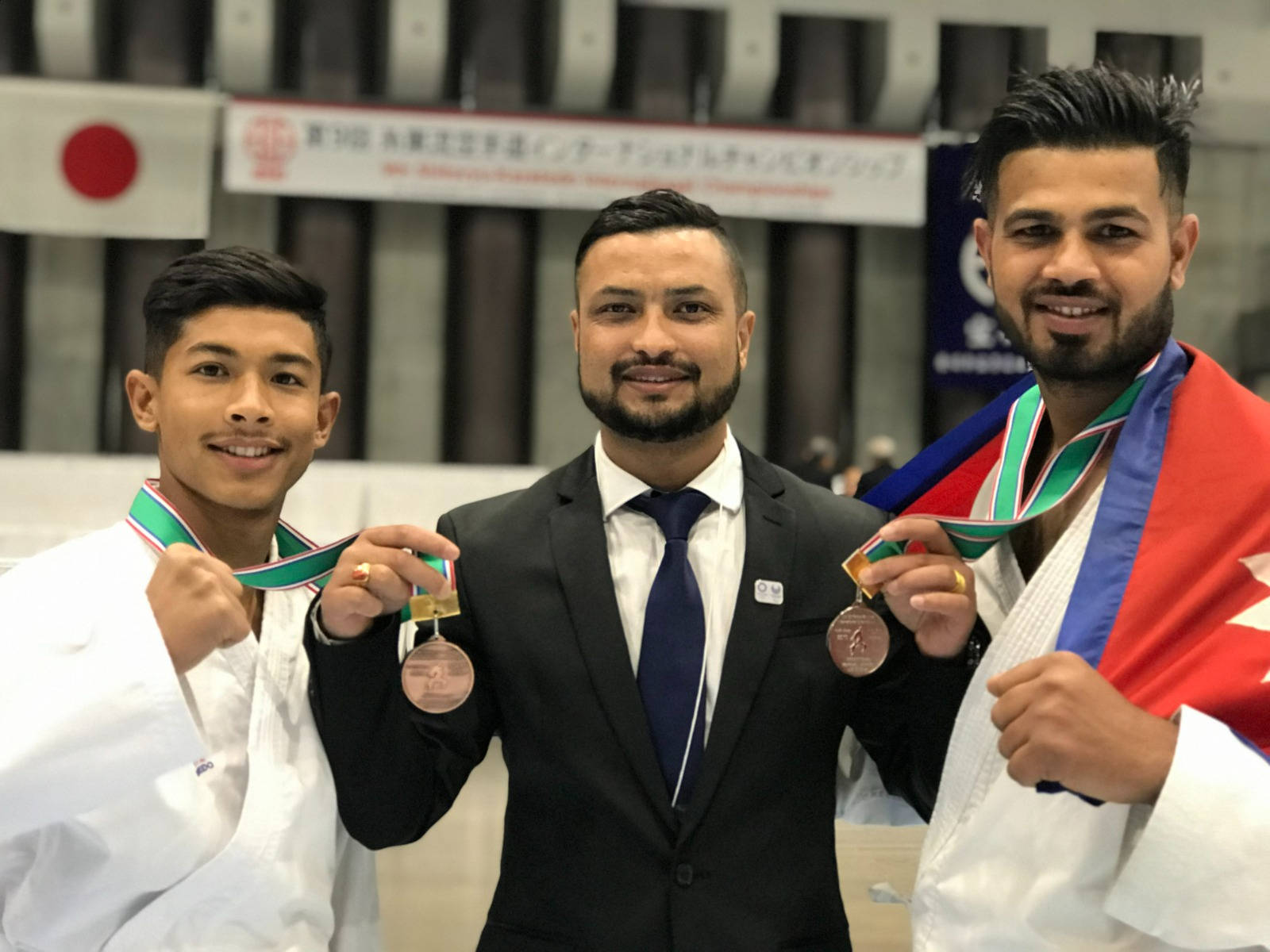
Historical medal in 9th Shito-Ryu world karate championship as a coach.

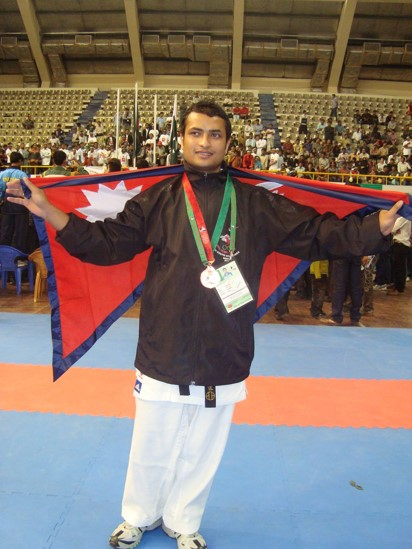
Moment after winning bronze medal in 11th South Asian Games.

== National Karate Awards. ==
Competition	Award	Year
5th National karate championship and selection of 9th SAF Games Pakistan	Gold Medal	2004
6th National karate championship	Gold Medal	2006
National Karate Selection Championship in November 2009 for 11th Sag Games, Dhaka, Bangladesh	Gold Medal	2009
Dhirendra Memorial National karate, Judo and Kick boxing championship	Silver Medal	2002
Second Parshuram Meche Memorial Invitational International karate and kick boxing Championship	Gold Medal	2000
1st Sushma Koirala Memorial Indo Nepal karate and kick boxing Championship	Bronze Medal	1998
