= Chao Jou =

Taiwanese karateka (born 1995)

Personal information
- Born: 23 March 1995 (age 31)

Sport
- Country: Chinese Taipei
- Sport: Karate
- Weight class: 68 kg
- Events: Kumite; Team kumite
Medal record
Women's karate
Representing Chinese Taipei
Asian Games
Bronze medal – third place	2014 Incheon	Kumite 68 kg
Asian Championships
Silver medal – second place	2017 Astana	Team kumite
Bronze medal – third place	2013 Dubai	Team kumite
Bronze medal – third place	2015 Yokohama	Kumite 68 kg
Bronze medal – third place	2019 Tashkent	Kumite 68 kg
Bronze medal – third place	2023 Malacca	Team kumite

Chao Jou (born 23 March 1995) is a Taiwanese karateka. She won one of the bronze medals in the women's kumite 68 kg event at the 2014 Asian Games held in Incheon, South Korea. In 2018, she lost her bronze medal match against Kayo Someya of Japan in that event at the Asian Games held in Jakarta, Indonesia.

She won the silver medal in the women's team kumite event at the 2016 World University Karate Championships held in Braga, Portugal.

At the 2019 Asian Karate Championships held in Tashkent, Uzbekistan, she won one of the bronze medals in the women's kumite 68 kg event. In 2021, she competed in the women's 68 kg event at the World Karate Championships held in Dubai, United Arab Emirates.

In 2023, she won one of the bronze medals in the women's team kumite event at the Asian Karate Championships held in Malacca, Malaysia. She lost her bronze medal match in the women's kumite 68 kg event at the 2022 Asian Games held in Hangzhou, China.

== Achievements ==
Year	Competition	Venue	Rank	Event
2013	Asian Championships	Dubai, United Arab Emirates	3rd	Team kumite
2014	Asian Games	Incheon, South Korea	3rd	Kumite 68 kg
2015	Asian Championships	Yokohama, Japan	3rd	Kumite 68 kg
2017	Asian Championships	Astana, Kazakhstan	2nd	Team kumite
2019	Asian Championships	Tashkent, Uzbekistan	3rd	Kumite 68 kg
2023	Asian Championships	Malacca, Malaysia	3rd	Team kumite
