= 2023 World Karate Championships – Women's +68 kg =

Women's kumite +68 kg at the 2023 World Karate Championships
- Venue: László Papp Budapest Sports Arena
- Location: Budapest, Hungary
- Dates: 24, 28 October
- Competitors: 56 from 56 nations

Medalists
gold medal	Ayaka Saito	Japan
silver medal	María Torres	Spain
bronze medal	Menna Shaaban Okila	Egypt
bronze medal	Clio Ferracuti	Italy

The women's kumite +68 kg competition at the 2023 World Karate Championships was held on 24 and 28 October 2023.

== Results ==
=== Finals ===
Semifinals
(Japan) Ayaka Saito	3
(Egypt) Menna Shaaban Okila	1
(Spain) María Torres	4
(Kazakhstan) Sofya Berultseva	4

Final
(Japan) Ayaka Saito	6
(Spain) María Torres	0

=== Repechage ===
Repechage 1
(Germany) Johanna Kneer	2
(Iran) Leila Borjali	2

Repechage 2
(Germany) Johanna Kneer	5
(Tunisia) Chehinez Jemi	6

Bronze medal
(Tunisia) Chehinez Jemi	0
(Egypt) Menna Shaaban Okila	8

Repechage 1
(Poland) Julia Daniszewska	1
(Belgium) Ophélie Mulolo	0

Repechage 2
(Poland) Julia Daniszewska	0
(Italy) Clio Ferracuti	8

Bronze medal
(Italy) Clio Ferracuti	4
(Kazakhstan) Sofya Berultseva	4

=== Top half ===
==== Section 1 ====
First round
(Kosovo) Fortesa Orana	2
(Ukraine) Anastasiya Stepashko	0
(Tunisia) Chehinez Jemi	5
(South Africa) Elmien Viljoen	0
(Norway) Hannah Stubsjøen	0
(Venezuela) Oriana Rodriguez	7
(Saudi Arabia) Shamsa Al-Mosallam	1
(Uzbekistan) Mohlaroyim Hokimjonova	9
(Bulgaria) Aleksandra Stubleva	4
(Iran) Leila Borjali	6
(Germany) Johanna Kneer	2
(Philippines) Ariane Brito	0

Second round
(Kosovo) Fortesa Orana	0
(Tunisia) Chehinez Jemi	2
(Venezuela) Oriana Rodriguez	0
(Croatia) Lucija Lesjak	2
(Uzbekistan) Mohlaroyim Hokimjonova	1
(Iran) Leila Borjali	7
(Germany) Johanna Kneer	4
(Japan) Ayaka Saito	8

Third round
(Tunisia) Chehinez Jemi	5
(Croatia) Lucija Lesjak	5
(Iran) Leila Borjali	1
(Japan) Ayaka Saito	1

Quarterfinals
(Tunisia) Chehinez Jemi	3
(Japan) Ayaka Saito	7

==== Section 2 ====
First round
(Brazil) Brenda Pereira	10
(Costa Rica) Kylie Solís	0
(Slovakia) Dominika Tatárová	2
(Thailand) Kewalin Songklin	3
(Turkey) Meltem Hocaoğlu Akyol	0
(Algeria) Chaïma Oudira	3
(Romania) Maria Coman	2
(Slovenia) Zala Maria Žibret	4
(Morocco) Maroua Eddarhri	0
(El Salvador) Andrea de los Angeles Ruiz	0
Sunita Khalimova	5
(Switzerland) Fabienne Kaufmann	1

Second round
(Brazil) Brenda Pereira	1
(Thailand) Kewalin Songklin	0
(Algeria) Chaïma Oudira	2
(Cyprus) Theodosia Giamouki	0
(Slovenia) Zala Maria Žibret	3
(Morocco) Maroua Eddarhri	6
Sunita Khalimova	0
(Egypt) Menna Shaaban Okila	8

Third round
(Brazil) Brenda Pereira	2
(Algeria) Chaïma Oudira	2
(Morocco) Maroua Eddarhri	1
(Egypt) Menna Shaaban Okila	1

Quarterfinals
(Algeria) Chaïma Oudira	0
(Egypt) Menna Shaaban Okila	2

=== Bottom half ===
==== Section 3 ====
First round
(India) Bhuvaneshwari Jadhav	1
(Czech Republic) Klára Muzikářová	6
(Republic of Ireland) Shauna Mahon	0
(Bosnia and Herzegovina) Stefany Krešić	4
(Greece) Kyriaki Kydonaki	6
(Hong Kong) Ho Kai Yan	0
(Belgium) Ophélie Mulolo	2
(Chinese Taipei) Lin Yi-hsuan	1
(France) Nancy Garcia	1
(Finland) Titta Keinänen	3
(Poland) Julia Daniszewska	w/o
(Luxembourg) Pola Giorgetti

Second round
(Czech Republic) Klára Muzikářová	2
(Bosnia and Herzegovina) Stefany Krešić	6
(Greece) Kyriaki Kydonaki	1
(Italy) Clio Ferracuti	3
(Belgium) Ophélie Mulolo	1
(Finland) Titta Keinänen	0
(Poland) Julia Daniszewska
(Spain) María Torres	0

Third round
(Bosnia and Herzegovina) Stefany Krešić	1
(Italy) Clio Ferracuti	3
(Belgium) Ophélie Mulolo	0
(Spain) María Torres	0

Quarterfinals
(Italy) Clio Ferracuti	1
(Spain) María Torres	3

==== Section 4 ====
First round
(United States) Cirrus Lingl	0
(Colombia) Sayaka Osorio	2
(Austria) Nina Schuster	1
(Netherlands) Ingrid Creemers	2
(Sweden) Sophie Bao Bednarski	3
(Hungary) Dóra Fleischer	1
(Portugal) Ana Rita Oliveira	0
(Australia) Hannah Sullivan	2
(Montenegro) Milena Jovanović	2
(Serbia) Dijana Bota	2
(England) Rochelle Walters	3
(Scotland) Niamh Junner	4

Second round
(Colombia) Sayaka Osorio	2
(Netherlands) Ingrid Creemers	0
(Sweden) Sophie Bao Bednarski	0
(Canada) Lily-Rose Nolet	2
(Australia) Hannah Sullivan	5
(Serbia) Dijana Bota	2
(Scotland) Niamh Junner	0
(Kazakhstan) Sofya Berultseva	4

Third round
(Colombia) Sayaka Osorio	1
(Canada) Lily-Rose Nolet	3
(Australia) Hannah Sullivan	0
(Kazakhstan) Sofya Berultseva	4

Quarterfinals
(Canada) Lily-Rose Nolet	2
(Kazakhstan) Sofya Berultseva	5
