= 2022 European Karate Championships – Women's +68 kg =

European Karate Championship

Women's +68 kg at the 2022 European Karate Championships
- Venue: Karataş Şahinbey Sport Hall
- Location: Gaziantep, Turkey
- Dates: 25–28 May
- Competitors: 28 from 28 nations

Medalists
gold medal	Ivana Perović	Serbia
silver medal	Aicha Boussebaa	Hungary
bronze medal	Kyriaki Kydonaki	Greece
bronze medal	Nancy Garcia	France

The Women's +68 kg competition at the 2022 European Karate Championships was held from 25 to 28 May 2022.

== Results ==
=== Finals ===
Semifinals
(Serbia) Ivana Perović	1
(Croatia) Lucija Lesjak	0
(France) Nancy Garcia	3
(Hungary) Aicha Boussebaa	4

Final
(Serbia) Ivana Perović	1
(Hungary) Aicha Boussebaa	0

=== Repechage ===
Repechage 1
(Azerbaijan) Farida Aliyeva	5
(Luxembourg) Pola Giorgetti	0

Repechage 2
(Azerbaijan) Farida Aliyeva	0
(Greece) Kyriaki Kydonaki	1

Bronze medal
(Greece) Kyriaki Kydonaki	3
(Croatia) Lucija Lesjak	1

Repechage 1
(Austria) Lora Ziller	1
(Turkey) Meltem Hocaoğlu	6

Repechage 2
(Turkey) Meltem Hocaoğlu	0
(Scotland) Niamh Junner	1

Bronze medal
(Scotland) Niamh Junner	2
(France) Nancy Garcia	4

=== Top half ===
==== Section 1 ====
Round of 32
(Finland) Titta Keinänen	3
(Switzerland) Fabienne Kaufmann	0
(Belgium) Ophélie Mulolo	1
(Greece) Kyriaki Kydonaki	4
(Serbia) Ivana Perović	8
(Azerbaijan) Farida Aliyeva	2

Round of 16
(Finland) Titta Keinänen	0
(Greece) Kyriaki Kydonaki	1
(Serbia) Ivana Perović	0
(Luxembourg) Pola Giorgetti	0

Quarterfinals
(Greece) Kyriaki Kydonaki	2
(Serbia) Ivana Perović	2

==== Section 2 ====
Round of 32
(Poland) Patrycja Szelągiewicz	0
(Croatia) Lucija Lesjak	3
(Slovakia) Dominika Tatárová	1
(Netherlands) Ingrid Creemers	2
(Spain) María Torres	1
(Ukraine) Anastasiya Stepashko	0

Round of 16
(Croatia) Lucija Lesjak	3
(Netherlands) Ingrid Creemers	0
(Spain) María Torres	2
(Germany) Johanna Kneer	1

Quarterfinals
(Croatia) Lucija Lesjak	1
(Spain) María Torres	0

=== Bottom half ===
==== Section 3 ====
Round of 32
(France) Nancy Garcia	3
(Israel) Hala Mahly	2
(Czech Republic) Martina Šáchová	5
(Italy) Clio Ferracuti	1
(Montenegro) Milena Jovanović	0
(Bosnia and Herzegovina) Stefany Krešić	2

Round of 16
(France) Nancy Garcia	4
(Czech Republic) Martina Šáchová	0
(Bosnia and Herzegovina) Stefany Krešić	3
(Romania) Livia Pavel	2

Quarterfinals
(France) Nancy Garcia	3
(Bosnia and Herzegovina) Stefany Krešić	1

==== Section 4 ====
Round of 32
(Cyprus) Theodosia Giamouki	0
(Kosovo) Fortesa Orana	1
(Portugal) Ana Rita Oliveira	0
(Scotland) Niamh Junner	1
(Austria) Lora Ziller	3
(Hungary) Aicha Boussebaa	4

Round of 16
(Kosovo) Fortesa Orana	1
(Scotland) Niamh Junner	2
(Hungary) Aicha Boussebaa	0
(Turkey) Meltem Hocaoğlu	0

Quarterfinals
(Scotland) Niamh Junner	3
(Hungary) Aicha Boussebaa	5
