= Finland at the 2022 World Games =

- IOC code: FIN
- NOC: Finnish Olympic Committee

in Birmingham, United States 7 July 2022 – 17 July 2022
- Competitors: 37 (21 men and 16 women) in 13 sports
- Medals Ranked 60th: Gold 0 Silver 1 Bronze 1 Total 2

World Games appearances
- 1981; 1985; 1989; 1993; 1997; 2001; 2005; 2009; 2013; 2017; 2022; 2025

Finland competed at the 2022 World Games held in Birmingham, United States from 7 to 17 July 2022. Athletes representing Finland won one silver medal and one bronze medal. The country finished in 60th place in the medal table.

== Medalists ==
Medal	Name	Sport	Event	Date
Silver	Men's team	Floorball	Men's tournament	12 July
Bronze	Virve Vanhakoski	Kickboxing	Women's 70 kg	14 July

== Competitors ==
The following is the list of number of competitors in the Games.

Sport	Men	Women	Total
Aerobic gymnastics	0	8	8
Air sports	1	0	1
Archery	0	1	1
Dancesport	1	0	1
Floorball	14	0	14
Karate	0	1	1
Kickboxing	1	2	1
Muaythai	0	1	1
Orienteering	2	0	2
Powerlifting	1	0	1
Rhythmic gymnastics	—N/a	1	1
Squash	0	2	2
Sumo	1	0	1
Total	21	16	37

== Aerobic gymnastics ==
Finland competed in aerobic gymnastics.

== Air sports ==
Finland competed in drone racing.

== Archery ==
Finland competed in archery.

== Dancesport ==
Finland competed in dancesport.

== Floorball ==
Finland won the silver medal in the floorball tournament.

Summary

Team	Event	Group stage				Semifinal	Final / BM / Pl.	
Team	Event	Opposition Score	Opposition Score	Opposition Score	Rank	Opposition Score	Opposition Score	Rank
Finland men's	Men's tournament	Canada; W 18–0	Czech Republic; W 5–3	United States; W 16–0	1 Q	Latvia; W 5–1	Sweden; W 5–6	2nd place, silver medalist(s)

Group play

Pos	Team	Pld	W	D	L	GF	GA	GD	Pts	Qualification
1	Finland	3	3	0	0	39	3	+36	6	Semifinals
2	Czech Republic	3	2	0	1	33	6	+27	4	Semifinals
3	Canada	3	1	0	2	9	38	−29	2	Fifth place game
4	United States (H)	3	0	0	3	4	38	−34	0	Seventh place game

Source: IFF
(H) Hosts

8 July 2022; 12:00	Finland	18–0 (5–0, 6–0, 7–0)	Canada	BJCC East Exhibition Hall, Birmingham; Attendance: 119

IFF

9 July 2022; 12:00	Finland	5–3 (2–0, 2–1, 1–2)	Czech Republic	BJCC East Exhibition Hall, Birmingham; Attendance: 667

IFF

10 July 2022; 18:00	United States	0–16 (0–6, 0–6, 0–4)	Finland	BJCC East Exhibition Hall, Birmingham; Attendance: 228

IFF

Semifinal

11 July 2022; 12:15	Finland	5–1 (1–0, 1–0, 3–1)	Latvia	BJCC East Exhibition Hall, Birmingham; Attendance: 131

IFF

Gold medal game

12 July 2022; 13:00	Sweden	6–5 (0–1, 3–0, 3–4)	Finland	BJCC East Exhibition Hall, Birmingham; Attendance: 807

IFF

== Karate ==
Finland competed in karate.

Athlete	Event	Elimination round				Semifinal	Final / BM	
Athlete	Event	Opposition Result	Opposition Result	Opposition Result	Rank	Opposition Result	Opposition Result	Rank
Titta Keinänen	Women's kumite +68 kg	Okila (EGY); W 1–0	Chatziliadou (GRE); W 3–0	Jemi (TUN); W 3–1	1 Q	Torres (ESP); L 0–2	Jemi (TUN); L 0–1	4

== Kickboxing ==
Finland won one bronze medal in kickboxing.

== Muaythai ==
Finland competed in muaythai.

== Orienteering ==
Finland competed in orienteering.

== Powerlifting ==
Finland competed in powerlifting.

== Rhythmic gymnastics ==
Finland competed in rhythmic gymnastics.

== Squash ==
Finland competed in squash.

== Sumo ==
Finland competed in sumo.
