= Montenegro at the 2022 Mediterranean Games =

- IOC code: MNE
- NOC: Montenegrin Olympic Committee

in Oran, Algeria 25 June 2022 – 6 July 2022
- Competitors: 30 in 8 sports
- Flag bearer: Milivoj Dukić (sailing)
- Medals Ranked 20th: Gold 1 Silver 4 Bronze 2 Total 7

Mediterranean Games appearances (overview)
- 2009; 2013; 2018; 2022; 2026

Other related appearances
- Yugoslavia (1951–1991); Serbia and Montenegro (1997–2005)

Montenegro competed at the 2022 Mediterranean Games held in Oran, Algeria from 25 June to 6 July 2022.

== Medalists ==
Medal	Name	Sport	Event	Date
Gold	Marija Vuković	Athletics	Women's high jump	3 July
Silver	Milena Jovanović	Karate	Women's +68 kg	27 June
Silver	Men's water polo team	Water polo	Men's tournament	30 June
Silver	Stefan Savković	Boxing	Men's welterweight	1 July
Silver	Bojana Gojković	Boxing	Women's bantamweight	1 July
Bronze	Petar Marčić	Boxing	Men's light heavyweight	30 June
Bronze	Danijel Furtula	Athletics	Men's discus throw	3 July

== Athletics ==
Montenegro won two medals in athletics.

Key

- Note–Ranks given for track events are within the athlete's heat only
- Q = Qualified for the next round
- q = Qualified for the next round as a fastest loser or, in field events, by position without achieving the qualifying target
- NR = National record
- N/A = Round not applicable for the event
- Bye = Athlete not required to compete in round

Men's

Field events

Athlete	Event	Qualification		Final	
Athlete	Event	Result	Rank	Result	Rank
Tomaš Đurović	Shot put	—N/a		DNS	
Danijel Furtula	Discus throw	—N/a		61.74	3rd place, bronze medalist(s)

Women's

Field events

Athlete	Event	Qualification		Final	
Athlete	Event	Result	Rank	Result	Rank
Marija Vuković	High jump	—N/a		1.92	1st place, gold medalist(s)

== Boules ==
Men

- Miroslav Petković
- Nenad Ranković
- Gracija Stjepčević

Women

- Nina Boljević

== Boxing ==
Montenegro won three medals in boxing.

Men

Athlete	Event	Round of 16	Quarterfinals	Semifinals	Final	
Athlete	Event	Opposition Result	Opposition Result	Opposition Result	Opposition Result	Rank
Stefan Savković	Welterweight	Rafail Pafios (CYP); W 3–0	Salvatore Cavallaro (ITA); W 3–0	Omar Elsayed (EGY); W 3–0	Jugurtha Ait-Bekka (ALG); L W/O	2nd place, silver medalist(s)
Petar Marčić	Light Heavyweight	bye	Abdelrahman Oraby (EGY); W 3–0	Mohammed Houmri (ALG); L 0–3	—N/a	3rd place, bronze medalist(s)

Women

Athlete	Event	Round of 16	Quarterfinals	Semifinals	Final	
Athlete	Event	Opposition Result	Opposition Result	Opposition Result	Opposition Result	Rank
Bojana Gojković	Bantamweight	bye	Nikolina Ćaćić (CRO); W 3–0	Fatma Hadjala (ALG); W 3–0	Hatice Akbaş (TUR); L 0–3	2nd place, silver medalist(s)

== Judo ==
Montenegro competed in judo.

Women

Athlete	Event	Round of 16	Quarterfinals	Semifinals	Repechage	Final / BM	
Athlete	Event	Opposition Result	Opposition Result	Opposition Result	Opposition Result	Opposition Result	Rank
Jovana Peković	78 kg	Lobnik (SLO); W 01–00	Ouallal (ALG); L 01–10	—N/a	Politi (ITA); W w/o	Pavić (CRO); L 00–11	5

== Karate ==
Montenegro won one medal in karate.

Men

Athlete	Event	Round of 16	Quarterfinals	Semifinals	Repechage	Final / BM	
Athlete	Event	Opposition Result	Opposition Result	Opposition Result	Opposition Result	Opposition Result	Rank
Nikola Malović	−84 kg	Muhović (BIH); W 2–0	Kvesić (CRO); L 1–3	—N/a	—N/a	—N/a	7

Women

Athlete	Event	Round of 16	Quarterfinals	Semifinals	Repechage	Final / BM	
Athlete	Event	Opposition Result	Opposition Result	Opposition Result	Opposition Result	Opposition Result	Rank
Milena Jovanović	+68 kg	Okila (EGY); W 3–2	Torres (ESP); W 5–0	Jemi (TUN); W 0–0	—N/a	Kydonaki (GRE); L 1–2	2nd place, silver medalist(s)

== Sailing ==
Men

- Milivoj Dukić
- Ilija Marković

== Taekwondo ==
Montenegro competed in Taekwondo.

Legend

- PTG — Won by Points Gap
- SUP — Won by superiority
- OT — Won on over time (Golden Point)
- DQ — Won by disqualification
- PUN — Won by punitive declaration
- WD — Won by withdrawal

Men

Athlete	Event	Round of 32	Round of 16	Quarterfinals	Semifinals	Final	Rank
Zinedin Bećović	68 kg	Bye	Stanić (SRB); W 42-18^{PUN}	Reçber (TUR); L 34-35^{GBP}	—N/a	—N/a	5

Women

Athlete	Event	Round of 16	Quarterfinals	Semifinals	Final	Rank
Jelena Peruničić	49 kg	Elaasal (MAR); L 3-25^{PTG}	—N/a	—N/a	—N/a	9

== Water polo ==
Summary

Team	Event	Group stage					Semifinal	Final / BM / Pl.	
Team	Event	Opposition Score	Opposition Score	Opposition Score	Opposition Score	Rank	Opposition Score	Opposition Score	Rank
Montenegro men's	Men's tournament	France; W 16–8	Portugal; W 23–4	Serbia; L 8–9	Slovenia; W 11–6	2 Q	Spain; W 10–9	Serbia; L 8–9	2nd place, silver medalist(s)

Squad

- Neđo Baštrica
- Andrija Bjelica
- Draško Samardžić
- Danilo Dragović
- Danilo Krivokapić
- Pavle Krivokapić
- Milan Nikaljević
- Danilo Stupar
- Balša Vučković
- Lazar Vukićević
- Vladan Vukićević
- Dušan Vuković
- Miloš Vukšić

Group play

Pos	Team	Pld	W	D	L	GF	GA	GD	Pts	Qualification
1	Serbia	4	4	0	0	65	24	+41	8	Semifinals
2	Montenegro	4	3	0	1	58	27	+31	6	Semifinals
3	Slovenia	4	2	0	2	41	45	−4	4	Fifth place game
4	France	4	1	0	3	37	55	−18	2	Seventh place game
5	Portugal	4	0	0	4	22	72	−50	0	

Source: Oran 2022

24 June 2022; 12:00	Report	France	8–16	Montenegro	Oran; Referees: Grigorios Spanoudis (GRE), Sergio Jiménez (ESP)
24 June 2022; 12:00	Report	Score by quarters: 2–4, 2–4, 1–4, 3–4			Oran; Referees: Grigorios Spanoudis (GRE), Sergio Jiménez (ESP)
24 June 2022; 12:00	Report	Mas, Rodrigues 4	Goals	L. Vukičević 5	Oran; Referees: Grigorios Spanoudis (GRE), Sergio Jiménez (ESP)

26 June 2022; 12:00	Report	Montenegro	23–4	Portugal	Oran; Referees: Arnaldo Petronilli (ITA), Sergio Jiménez (ESP)
26 June 2022; 12:00	Report	Score by quarters: 5–1, 5–2, 6–1, 7–0			Oran; Referees: Arnaldo Petronilli (ITA), Sergio Jiménez (ESP)
26 June 2022; 12:00	Report	Vučković 5	Goals	Moreira, Santiago 2	Oran; Referees: Arnaldo Petronilli (ITA), Sergio Jiménez (ESP)

27 June 2022; 10:00	Report	Serbia	9–8	Montenegro	Oran; Referees: Sergio Jiménez (ESP), Grigorios Spanoudis (GRE)
27 June 2022; 10:00	Report	Score by quarters: 2–3, 1–2, 2–1, 4–2			Oran; Referees: Sergio Jiménez (ESP), Grigorios Spanoudis (GRE)
27 June 2022; 10:00	Report	Kojić 3	Goals	Baštrica 2	Oran; Referees: Sergio Jiménez (ESP), Grigorios Spanoudis (GRE)

28 June 2022; 10:00	Report	Montenegro	11–6	Slovenia	Oran; Referees: Arnaldo Petronilli (ITA), Grigorios Spanoudis (GRE)
28 June 2022; 10:00	Report	Score by quarters: 3–0, 4–4, 1–2, 3–0			Oran; Referees: Arnaldo Petronilli (ITA), Grigorios Spanoudis (GRE)
28 June 2022; 10:00	Report	Vučković, L. Vukičević 3	Goals	Čanč 2	Oran; Referees: Arnaldo Petronilli (ITA), Grigorios Spanoudis (GRE)

Semifinal

29 June 2022; 15:00	Report	Spain	9–10	Montenegro	Oran; Referees: Arnaldo Petronilli (ITA), Igor Virijević (SRB)
29 June 2022; 15:00	Report	Score by quarters: 2–2, 3–1, 2–3, 2–4			Oran; Referees: Arnaldo Petronilli (ITA), Igor Virijević (SRB)
29 June 2022; 15:00	Report	three players 2	Goals	Baštrica 4	Oran; Referees: Arnaldo Petronilli (ITA), Igor Virijević (SRB)

Final

30 June 2022; 13:00	Report	Montenegro	8–9	Serbia	Oran; Referees: Ghislain Dehon (FRA), Sergio Jiménez (ESP)
30 June 2022; 13:00	Report	Score by quarters: 2–1, 2–4, 3–2, 1–2			Oran; Referees: Ghislain Dehon (FRA), Sergio Jiménez (ESP)
30 June 2022; 13:00	Report	L. Vukičević 3	Goals	Gavrilović, Kojić 2	Oran; Referees: Ghislain Dehon (FRA), Sergio Jiménez (ESP)
