= 2025 European Karate Championships – Women's +68 kg =

European Karate Championship

Women's +68 kg at the 2025 European Karate Championships
- Venue: Karen Demirchyan Complex
- Location: Yerevan, Armenia
- Dates: 8, 10 May
- Competitors: 33 from 31 nations

Medalists
gold medal	Kyriaki Kydonaki	Greece
silver medal	Dariia Bulay	Ukraine
bronze medal	Nikolina Golomboš	Croatia
bronze medal	María Torres	Spain

The women's +68 kg competition at the 2025 European Karate Championships was held on 8 and 10 May 2025.

== Results ==
=== Finals ===
Semifinals
(Greece) Kyriaki Kydonaki	1
(Turkey) Zeyna Gaballa	0
(Ukraine) Dariia Bulay	7
(Spain) María Torres	2

Final
(Greece) Kyriaki Kydonaki	2
(Ukraine) Dariia Bulay	0

=== Repechage ===
Repechage 1
(Croatia) Nikolina Golomboš	3
(Montenegro) Milena Jovanović	2

Repechage 2
(Croatia) Nikolina Golomboš	5
(Romania) Maria Coman	1

Repechage 3
(Croatia) Nikolina Golomboš	2
(Portugal) Ana Rita Oliveira	0

Bronze medal
(Croatia) Nikolina Golomboš	4
(Turkey) Zeyna Gaballa	1

Repechage 1
(England) Rochelle Walters	3
Darya Pipko	2

Repechage 2
(England) Rochelle Walters	3
(France) Nancy Garcia	2

Bronze medal
(England) Rochelle Walters	0
(Spain) María Torres	0

=== Top half ===
==== Section 1 ====
Round of 64
(Croatia) Nikolina Golomboš	1
(Greece) Kyriaki Kydonaki	3

Round of 32
(Greece) Kyriaki Kydonaki	4
(Montenegro) Milena Jovanović	1
(Romania) Maria Coman	4
(Slovenia) Zala Maria Žibret	2
(North Macedonia) Erdona Ziberi	3
(Portugal) Ana Rita Oliveira	4
(Scotland) Niamh Junner	10
(Italy) Clio Ferracuti	2

Round of 16
(Greece) Kyriaki Kydonaki	3
(Romania) Maria Coman	0
(Portugal) Ana Rita Oliveira	1
(Scotland) Niamh Junner	0

Quarterfinals
(Greece) Kyriaki Kydonaki	5
(Portugal) Ana Rita Oliveira	3

==== Section 2 ====
Round of 32
(Austria) Lora Ziller	0
(Turkey) Zeyna Gaballa	7
(Kosovo) Fortesa Orana	2
(Belgium) Ophélie Mulolo	7
(Hungary) Dóra Fleischer	0
(Cyprus) Theodosia Giamouki	4
(Switzerland) Pauline Bonjour	0
(Germany) Johanna Kneer	4

Round of 16
(Turkey) Zeyna Gaballa	0
(Belgium) Ophélie Mulolo	0
(Cyprus) Theodosia Giamouki	4
(Germany) Johanna Kneer	3

Quarterfinals
(Turkey) Zeyna Gaballa	4
(Cyprus) Theodosia Giamouki	2

=== Bottom half ===
==== Section 3 ====
Round of 32
(England) Rochelle Walters	2
(Ukraine) Dariia Bulay	6
(Serbia) Ivana Perović	0
Darya Pipko	3
(Sweden) Sophie Bao Bednarski	4
(Republic of Ireland) Zoe McDermott	0
(Finland) Sonja Voutilainen	1
(France) Nancy Garcia	7

Round of 16
(Ukraine) Dariia Bulay	7
Darya Pipko	5
(Sweden) Sophie Bao Bednarski	2
(France) Nancy Garcia	3

Quarterfinals
(Ukraine) Dariia Bulay	5
(France) Nancy Garcia	2

==== Section 4 ====
Round of 32
(Norway) Hannah Stubsjøen	3
(Armenia) Anita Makyan	2
(Poland) Julia Daniszewska	3
(Netherlands) Ingrid Creemers	2
(Lithuania) Monika Žalytė	0
Masoumeh Moharrami	8
(Bosnia and Herzegovina) Stefani Krešić	2
(Spain) María Torres	3

Round of 16
(Norway) Hannah Stubsjøen	1
(Poland) Julia Daniszewska	7
Masoumeh Moharrami	0
(Spain) María Torres	4

Quarterfinals
(Poland) Julia Daniszewska	1
(Spain) María Torres	3
