= 2021 World Karate Championships – Women's +68 kg =

World Karate Championship

Women's kumite +68 kg at the 2021 World Karate Championships
- Venue: Hamdan Sports Complex
- Location: Dubai, United Arab Emirates
- Dates: 16–20 November
- Competitors: 54 from 54 nations

Medalists
gold medal	María Torres	Spain
silver medal	Menna Shaaban Okila	Egypt
bronze medal	Sofya Berultseva	Kazakhstan
bronze medal	Lucija Lesjak	Croatia

The Women's +68 kg competition at the 2021 World Karate Championships was held from 16 to 20 November 2021.

== Results ==
=== Finals ===
Semifinals
(Spain) María Torres	7
(Kazakhstan) Sofya Berultseva	5
(Croatia) Lucija Lesjak	1
(Egypt) Menna Shaaban Okila	2

Final
(Spain) María Torres	5
(Egypt) Menna Shaaban Okila	4

=== Repechage ===
Repechage 1
(Tajikistan) Mokhlaroyim Khakimjonova	0
(Hungary) Dorottya Pap	4

Repechage 2
(Hungary) Dorottya Pap	3
(Kosovo) Fortesa Orana	1

Repechage 3
(Hungary) Dorottya Pap	1
(Serbia) Ivana Perović	1

Bronze medal
(Serbia) Ivana Perović	7
(Kazakhstan) Sofya Berultseva	11

Repechage 1
Vera Kovaleva	1
(Slovakia) Dominika Tatárová	1

Repechage 2
Vera Kovaleva	1
(Brazil) Brenda Pereira	0

Repechage 3
Vera Kovaleva	4
(Czech Republic) Martina Šáchová	6

Bronze medal
(Czech Republic) Martina Šáchová	2
(Croatia) Lucija Lesjak	3

=== Top half ===
==== Section 1 ====
First round
(South Africa) Elmien Viljoen	0
(Switzerland) Fabienne Kaufmann	3
(Serbia) Ivana Perović	1
(England) Rochelle Walters	0
(Hong Kong) Ho Kai Yan	1
(Japan) Ayaka Saito	2
(Cameroon) Alexandre Ekani	0
(Kosovo) Fortesa Orana	9
(Germany) Johanna Kneer	3
(Tunisia) Chehinez Jemi	3
(Tajikistan) Mokhlaroyim Khakimjonova	3
(Spain) María Torres	9

Second round
(Switzerland) Fabienne Kaufmann	1
(Serbia) Ivana Perović	2
(Japan) Ayaka Saito	1
(Norway) Lotte Ørbæk Andersen	3
(Kosovo) Fortesa Orana	1
(Tunisia) Chehinez Jemi	0
(Spain) María Torres	3
(Hungary) Dorottya Pap	0

Third round
(Serbia) Ivana Perović	3
(Norway) Lotte Ørbæk Andersen	0
(Kosovo) Fortesa Orana	0
(Spain) María Torres	2

Quarterfinals
(Serbia) Ivana Perović	0
(Spain) María Torres	1

==== Section 2 ====
First round
(Italy) Clio Ferracuti	5
Kewalin Songklin	0
(Belgium) Ophélie Mulolo	2
(Bosnia and Herzegovina) Matea Noah Medić	1
(Romania) Alina Mitran	0
(Finland) Titta Keinänen	1
(Kenya) Nancy Eunifrace	0
(Turkey) Meltem Hocaoğlu	5
(France) Nancy Garcia	0
(Kazakhstan) Sofya Berultseva	2

Second round
(Italy) Clio Ferracuti	2
(Belgium) Ophélie Mulolo	3
(Finland) Titta Keinänen	4
(Poland) Patrycja Szelągiewicz	0
(Turkey) Meltem Hocaoğlu	1
(Kyrgyzstan) Olga Maltseva	0
(Kazakhstan) Sofya Berultseva	2
(Ukraine) Anastasiya Stepashko	0

Third round
(Belgium) Ophélie Mulolo	0
(Finland) Titta Keinänen	5
(Turkey) Meltem Hocaoğlu	0
(Kazakhstan) Sofya Berultseva	6

Quarterfinals
(Finland) Titta Keinänen	0
(Kazakhstan) Sofya Berultseva	3

=== Bottom half ===
==== Section 3 ====
First round
(Portugal) Ana Rita Oliveira	0
(Sweden) Lisa Rasmusson	5
(Ecuador) Valeria Echever	2
(Democratic Republic of the Congo) Nancy Tshiaba	0
(Croatia) Lucija Lesjak	2
(Austria) Lora Ziller	2
(United States) Cirrus Lingl	5
(Azerbaijan) Farida Aliyeva	0
(Denmark) Sofie Abild	1
(North Macedonia) Simona Simovska	4
(Chinese Taipei) Wen Tzu-hsuan	2
(Colombia) Shanee Torres	2

Second round
(Sweden) Lisa Rasmusson	7
(Ecuador) Valeria Echever	3
(Croatia) Lucija Lesjak	8
(Canada) Yashna Hathi	0
(United States) Cirrus Lingl	2
(North Macedonia) Simona Simovska	0
(Colombia) Shanee Torres	1
(Algeria) Loubna Mekdas	2

Third round
(Sweden) Lisa Rasmusson	1
(Croatia) Lucija Lesjak	6
(United States) Cirrus Lingl	7
(Algeria) Loubna Mekdas	3

Quarterfinals
(Croatia) Lucija Lesjak	2
(United States) Cirrus Lingl	0

==== Section 4 ====
First round
(Syria) Diana Mohamad	0
(Cyprus) Theodosia Giamouki	3
(Luxembourg) Pola Giorgetti	3
(Netherlands) Ingrid Creemers	3
(Czech Republic) Martina Šáchová	3
(Scotland) Niamh Junner	2
Vera Kovaleva	1
(Egypt) Menna Shaaban Okila	1
(Brazil) Brenda Pereira	6
(Montenegro) Milena Jovanović	5

Second round
(Cyprus) Theodosia Giamouki	0
(Netherlands) Ingrid Creemers	1
(Czech Republic) Martina Šáchová	3
(Australia) Michelle Wilson	0
(Egypt) Menna Shaaban Okila	3
(Slovakia) Dominika Tatárová	0
(Brazil) Brenda Pereira	3
(Greece) Eleni Chatziliadou	1

Third round
(Netherlands) Ingrid Creemers	2
(Czech Republic) Martina Šáchová	6
(Egypt) Menna Shaaban Okila	1
(Brazil) Brenda Pereira	0

Quarterfinals
(Czech Republic) Martina Šáchová	0
(Egypt) Menna Shaaban Okila	5
