= 2023 European Karate Championships – Women's +68 kg =

European Karate Championship

Women's +68 kg at the 2023 European Karate Championships
- Venue: Palacio Multiusos de Guadalajara
- Location: Guadalajara, Spain
- Dates: 22, 25 March
- Competitors: 29 from 29 nations

Medalists
| gold medal | Johanna Kneer | Germany |
| silver medal | Farida Aliyeva | Azerbaijan |
| bronze medal | Nancy Garcia | France |
| bronze medal | Clio Ferracuti | Italy |

The Women's +68 kg competition at the 2023 European Karate Championships was held on 22 and 25 March 2023.

== Results ==
=== Finals ===
Semifinals
(France) Nancy Garcia | 3
(Germany) Johanna Kneer | 4
(Azerbaijan) Farida Aliyeva | 1
(Italy) Clio Ferracuti | 3

Final
(Germany) Johanna Kneer | 0
(Azerbaijan) Farida Aliyeva | 0

=== Repechage ===
Repechage 1
(Cyprus) Theodosia Giamouki | 0
(Turkey) Meltem Hocaoğlu Akyol | 2

Repechage 2
(Turkey) Meltem Hocaoğlu Akyol | 4
(Netherlands) Ingrid Creemers | 0

Bronze medal
(Turkey) Meltem Hocaoğlu Akyol | 0
(France) Nancy Garcia | 3

Repechage 1
(Slovenia) Zala Žibret | 2
(Croatia) Lucija Lesjak | 1

Repechage 2
(Slovenia) Zala Žibret | 0
(Scotland) Niamh Junner | 0

Bronze medal
(Scotland) Niamh Junner | 2
(Italy) Clio Ferracuti | 4

=== Top half ===
==== Section 1 ====
Round of 32
(Israel) Hala Mahly | 1
(Belgium) Ophélie Mulolo | 2
(Switzerland) Fabienne Kaufmann | 2
(France) Nancy Garcia | 3
(Norway) Hannah Stubsjøen | 0
(Luxembourg) Pola Giorgetti | 5
(Liechtenstein) Stella Sprenger | 0
(Greece) Kyriaki Kydonaki | 1

Round of 16
(Belgium) Ophélie Mulolo | 1
(France) Nancy Garcia | 3
(Luxembourg) Pola Giorgetti | 1
(Greece) Kyriaki Kydonaki | 3

Quarterfinals
(France) Nancy Garcia | 1
(Greece) Kyriaki Kydonaki | 1

==== Section 2 ====
Round of 32
(North Macedonia) Bojana Maneva | w/o
(Finland) Titta Keinänen
(Montenegro) Milena Jovanović | 3
(Netherlands) Ingrid Creemers | 4
(Germany) Johanna Kneer | 2
(Cyprus) Theodosia Giamouki | 2

Round of 16
(North Macedonia) Bojana Maneva | 1
(Netherlands) Ingrid Creemers | 4
(Germany) Johanna Kneer | 1
(Turkey) Meltem Hocaoğlu Akyol | 0

Quarterfinals
(Netherlands) Ingrid Creemers | 1
(Germany) Johanna Kneer | 5

=== Bottom half ===
==== Section 3 ====
Round of 32
(Poland) Julia Daniszewska | 3
(Scotland) Niamh Junner | 5
(Romania) Maria Coman | 8
(Serbia) Ivana Perović | 2
(Azerbaijan) Farida Aliyeva | 3
(Slovenia) Zala Žibret | 1

Round of 16
(Scotland) Niamh Junner | 4
(Romania) Maria Coman | 1
(Azerbaijan) Farida Aliyeva | 6
(Croatia) Lucija Lesjak | 3

Quarterfinals
(Scotland) Niamh Junner | 0
(Azerbaijan) Farida Aliyeva | 6

==== Section 4 ====
Round of 32
(England) Rochelle Walters | 3
(Portugal) Flávia Ribeiro | 0
(Ukraine) Yulia Rusu | 4
(Bosnia and Herzegovina) Stefany Krešić | 2
(Hungary) Aicha Boussebaa | 0
(Italy) Clio Ferracuti | 3

Round of 16
(England) Rochelle Walters | 3
(Ukraine) Yulia Rusu | 4
(Italy) Clio Ferracuti | 5
(Spain) María Torres | 2

Quarterfinals
(Ukraine) Yulia Rusu | 1
(Italy) Clio Ferracuti | 8
