= Karate at the 2022 Mediterranean Games – Women's +68 kg =

Women's kumite +68 kg at the 2022 Mediterranean Games
- Venue: Mohammed ben Ahmed CCO Hall 03 and 06
- Date: 27 June
- Competitors: 13 from 13 nations

Medalists
gold medal	Kyriaki Kydonaki	Greece
silver medal	Milena Jovanović	Montenegro
bronze medal	Meltem Hocaoğlu	Turkey
bronze medal	Chehinez Jemi	Tunisia

The women's +68 kg competition in karate at the 2022 Mediterranean Games was held on 27 June at the Mohammed ben Ahmed CCO Hall 03 and 06 in Oran.

== Results ==
=== Bracket ===
Round of 16
Meltem Hocaoğlu (TUR)	1
Kyriaki Kydonaki (GRE)	4
Ivana Perović (SRB)	1
Lucija Lesjak (CRO)	0
Aurora Crivelli (ITA)	0
Stefani Krešić (BIH)	0
Milena Jovanović (MNE)	3
Menna Shaaban Okila (EGY)	2
Chehinez Jemi (TUN)	6
Fortesa Orana (KOS)	3

Quarterfinals
Kyriaki Kydonaki (GRE)	0
Ivana Perović (SRB)	0
Aurora Crivelli (ITA)	8
Tricya Sombe (FRA)	0
Milena Jovanović (MNE)	5
María Torres (ESP)	0
Chehinez Jemi (TUN)	2
Loubna Mekdas (ALG)	0

Semifinals
Kyriaki Kydonaki (GRE)	3
Aurora Crivelli (ITA)	0
Milena Jovanović (MNE)	0
Chehinez Jemi (TUN)	0

Final
Kyriaki Kydonaki (GRE)	2
Milena Jovanović (MNE)	1

=== Repechage ===
Repechage
Meltem Hocaoğlu (TUR)	1
Ivana Perović (SRB)	0

Bronze medal
Meltem Hocaoğlu (TUR)	5
Aurora Crivelli (ITA)	4

Repechage
Menna Shaaban Okila (EGY)	1
María Torres (ESP)	3

Bronze medal
María Torres (ESP)	2
Chehinez Jemi (TUN)	3
