= 2024 European Karate Championships – Women's +68 kg =

European Karate Championship

Women's +68 kg at the 2024 European Karate Championships
- Venue: Krešimir Ćosić Hall
- Location: Zadar, Croatia
- Dates: 10–11 May
- Nations: 31
- Teams: 31

Medalists
gold medal	Johanna Kneer	Germany
silver medal	Rochelle Walters	England
bronze medal	Nancy Garcia	France
bronze medal	Zala Žibret	Slovenia

The women's +68 kg competition at the 2024 European Karate Championships was held from 10 to 11 May 2024.

== Results ==
=== Final ===
Final
Johanna Kneer (GER)	4
Rochelle Walters (ENG)	2

=== Top half ===
Round of 32
Maria Coman (ROU)	5
Yulia Rusu (UKR)	2
Erdona Ziberi (MKD)	0
Niamh Junner (SCO)	6
Nancy Garcia (FRA)	5
Shauna Mahon (IRL)	0
Elžbieta Lukošaitytė (LTU)	1
Johanna Kneer (GER)	2
Titta Keinänen (FIN)	3
Ophélie Mulolo (BEL)	1
Aleksandra Stubleva (BUL)	11
Fatma Uygur (TUR)	8
Lora Ziller (AUT)	1
Fortesa Orana (KOS)	2
Theodosia Giamouki (CYP)	2
Clio Ferracuti (ITA)	4

Round of 16
Maria Coman (ROU)	4
Niamh Junner (SCO)	2
Nancy Garcia (FRA)	0
Johanna Kneer (GER)	4
Titta Keinänen (FIN)	0
Aleksandra Stubleva (BUL)	0
Fortesa Orana (KOS)	4
Clio Ferracuti (ITA)	3

Quarterfinals
Maria Coman (ROU)	0
Johanna Kneer (GER)	5
Aleksandra Stubleva (BUL)	2
Fortesa Orana (KOS)	2

Semifinals
Johanna Kneer (GER)	7
Fortesa Orana (KOS)	0

=== Bottom half ===
Round of 32
Dominika Tatárová (SVK)	2
Dunja Rajić (SRB)	3
Sophie Bao Bednarski (SWE)	5
Stella Sprenger (LIE)	3
Zala Žibret (SLO)	0
Rochelle Walters (ENG)	2
Ana Rita Oliveira (POR)	8
Stefany Krešić (BIH)	0
Pola Giorgetti (LUX)	0
Julia Daniszewska (POL)	1
Nikolina Golomboš (CRO)	4
Milena Jovanović (MNE)	4
Fabienne Kaufmann (SUI)	2
Ingrid Creemers (NED)	1

Round of 16
Dunja Rajić (SRB)	0
Sophie Bao Bednarski (SWE)	4
Rochelle Walters (ENG)	1
Ana Rita Oliveira (POR)	1
Julia Daniszewska (POL)	3
Milena Jovanović (MNE)	0
Fabienne Kaufmann (SUI)	0
María Torres (ESP)	4

Quarterfinals
Sophie Bao Bednarski (SWE)	1
Rochelle Walters (ENG)	1
Julia Daniszewska (POL)	5
María Torres (ESP)	8

Semifinals
Rochelle Walters (ENG)	11
María Torres (ESP)	4

=== Repechage ===
Repechage round 1
Elžbieta Lukošaitytė (LTU)	1
Nancy Garcia (FRA)	5
Ana Rita Oliveira (POR)	1
Zala Žibret (SLO)	9

Repechage round 2
Maria Coman (ROU)	0
Nancy Garcia (FRA)	5
Sophie Bao Bednarski (SWE)	2
Zala Žibret (SLO)	3

Bronze medals
Fortesa Orana (KOS)	1
Nancy Garcia (FRA)	3
María Torres (ESP)	2
Zala Žibret (SLO)	7
