= 2023 World Karate Championships – Women's team kumite =

Women's team kumite at the 2023 World Karate Championships
- Venue: László Papp Budapest Sports Arena
- Location: Budapest, Hungary
- Dates: 26–29 October
- Nations: 55
- Teams: 55

Medalists
gold medal	Carlota Fernández; Adriana Gil; María Nieto; María Torres	Spain
silver medal	Tsubasa Kama; Ayaka Saito; Yuzuki Sawae; Sarara Shimada	Japan
bronze medal	Albulena Gervalla; Fortesa Orana; Vlera Qerimi; Hatigje Zejnullahu	Kosovo
bronze medal	Sadea Bečirević; Nikolina Golomboš; Lucija Lesjak; Lea Vukoja	Croatia

The women's team kumite competition at the 2023 World Karate Championships was held from 26 to 29 October 2023.

== Results ==
=== Finals ===
Semifinals
Kazakhstan	(5)
Japan	(7)
Croatia	0
Spain	2

Final
Japan	1
Spain	2

=== Repechage ===
Repechage 1
Kosovo	2
Switzerland	0

Repechage 2
Kosovo	2
France	0

Bronze medal
Kosovo	2
Kazakhstan	0

Repechage 1
Australia	2
Egypt	0

Repechage 2
Egypt	0
Hungary	2

Bronze medal
Hungary	0
Croatia	2

=== Top half ===
==== Section 1 ====
First round
Brazil	2
Netherlands	0
Finland	2
Thailand	1
Poland	1
Chinese Taipei	1
Iran	2
South Korea	0
Kazakhstan	2
Montenegro	0
Slovakia	2
Saudi Arabia	0

Second round
Brazil	2
Finland	1
Poland	0
Bosnia and Herzegovina	2
Iran	1
Kazakhstan	3
Slovakia	2
Italy	1

Third round
Brazil	2
Bosnia and Herzegovina	1
Kazakhstan	2
Slovakia	0

Quarterfinals
Brazil	1
Kazakhstan	2

==== Section 2 ====
First round
India	0
Switzerland	2
Canada	1
China	2
England	0
Kosovo	3
Greece	1
Latvia	2
North Macedonia	2
South Africa	1
Algeria	2
Azerbaijan	0

Second round
Switzerland	2
China	0
Kosovo	1
Japan	2
Latvia	0
North Macedonia	2
Algeria	0
France	2

Third round
Switzerland	1
Japan	1
North Macedonia	0
France	2

Quarterfinals
Japan	1
France	1

=== Bottom half ===
==== Section 3 ====
First round
Scotland	0
Turkey	2
Hong Kong	0
Croatia	2
Senegal	1
Belgium	2
Denmark	1
Romania	2
Cyprus	2
Portugal	1
Norway	0
Morocco	2

Second round
Turkey	1
Croatia	2
Belgium	2
Ireland	1
Romania	1
Cyprus	2
Morocco	2
Colombia	0

Third round
Croatia	2
Belgium	0
Cyprus	0
Morocco	2

Quarterfinals
Croatia	1
Morocco	1

==== Section 4 ====
First round
Sweden	0
Slovenia	2
Austria	2
Tunisia	0
Uzbekistan	1
Serbia	2
United States	1
Australia	2
Ukraine	1
Germany	2

Second round
Slovenia	1
Austria	1
Serbia	0
Hungary	2
Australia	0
Spain	2
Germany	0
Egypt	2

Third round
Austria	0
Hungary	2
Spain	2
Egypt	0

Quarterfinals
Hungary	1
Spain	2
