= Rochelle Walters =

English karateka (born 2000)

Personal information
- Born: 21 March 2000 (age 26)

Sport
- Country: England
- Sport: Karate
- Weight class: +68 kg
- Event: Kumite
Medal record
Women's karate
Representing England
World Championships
| Bronze medal – third place | 2025 Cairo | Kumite +68 kg |
European Championships
| Silver medal – second place | 2024 Zadar | Kumite +68 kg |

Rochelle Walters (born 21 March 2000) is an English karateka. Competing in the women's +68 kg event, she is a medalist in the at the European and World Karate Championships.

== Career ==
In November 2021, Walters competed in the women's +68 kg event at the World Karate Championships held in Dubai, United Arab Emirates where she was eliminated in her first match.

Walters competed in the women's +68 kg event at the 2023 European Karate Championships held in Guadalajara, Spain, where she was eliminated in the round of 16. She competed in the women's +68 kg event at the 2023 World Karate Championships held in Budapest, Hungary, where she was eliminated in the first round.

Walters won the silver medal in the women's +68 kg event at the 2024 European Karate Championships held in Zadar, Croatia. A year later, she faced María Torres in a bronze medal match in her event at the 2025 European Karate Championships held in Yerevan, Armenia, where she lost. She faced Torres again in the grand final of the Karate1 Premier League in June and lost once again. At the 2025 World Karate Championships held in Cairo, Egypt, Walters faced Ingrid Krijmers and won a bronze medal in the women's +68 kg event.
