= Ayaka Saito (karateka) =

Japanese karateka

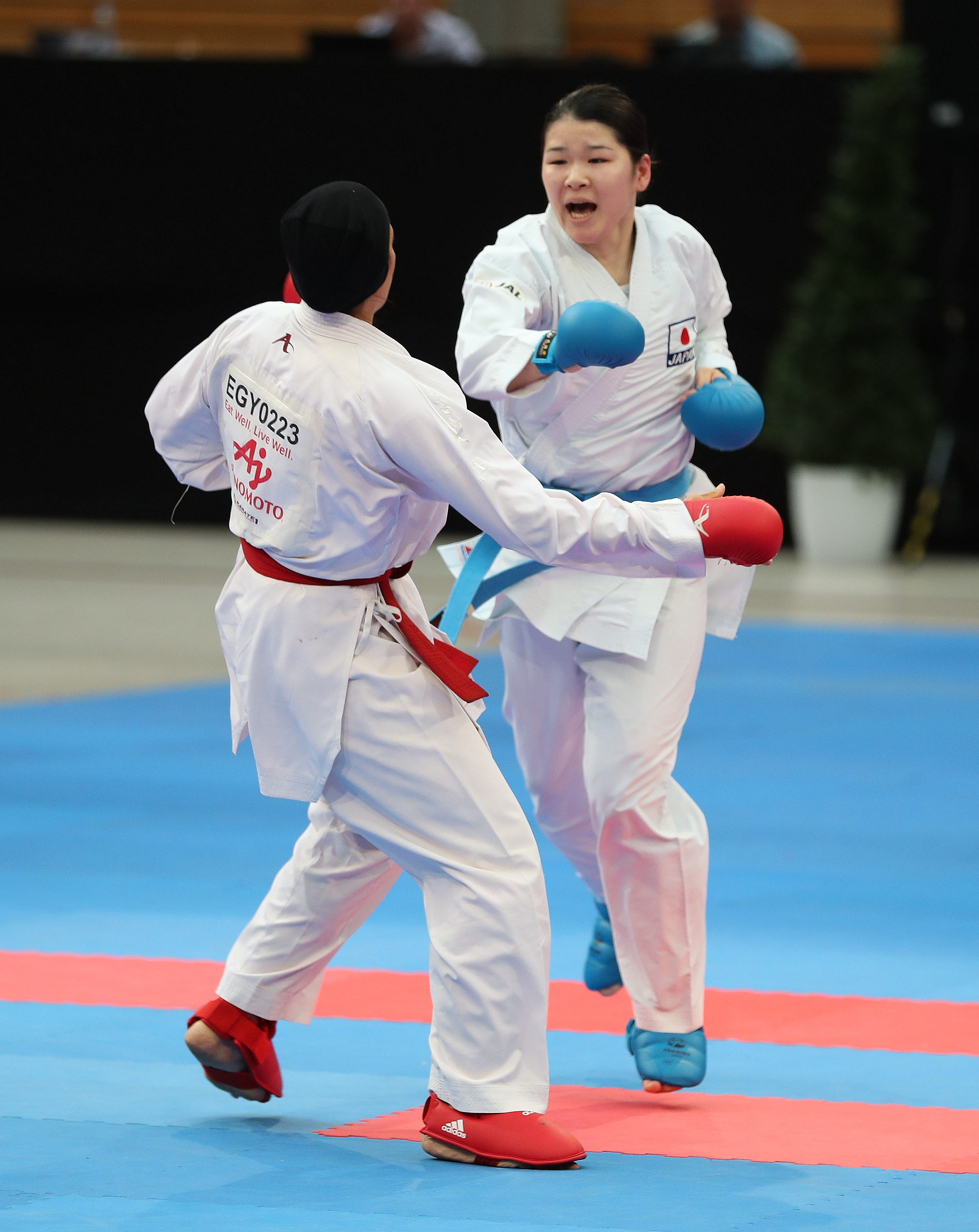
- Ayaka Saito in 2018

Sport
- Country: Japan
- Sport: Karate
- Weight class: +68 kg
- Events: Kumite; Team kumite
Medal record
Women's karate
Representing Japan
World Championships
Gold medal – first place	2023 Budapest	Kumite +68 kg
Silver medal – second place	2018 Madrid	Team kumite
Silver medal – second place	2023 Budapest	Team kumite
Asian Championships
Gold medal – first place	2018 Amman	Team kumite
Silver medal – second place	2019 Tashkent	Team kumite
Bronze medal – third place	2017 Astana	Team kumite
Bronze medal – third place	2022 Tashkent	Team kumite

Ayaka Saito (齊藤 綾夏, Saitō Ayaka) is a Japanese karateka. She won the gold medal in the women's +68 kg event at the 2023 World Karate Championships held in Budapest, Hungary.

== Career ==
At the 2018 World Karate Championships held in Madrid, Spain, she won the silver medal in the women's team kumite event. In 2018, she also won the gold medal in the women's team kumite event at the Asian Karate Championships held in Amman, Jordan.

At the 2019 Asian Karate Championships held in Tashkent, Uzbekistan, she also won the silver medal in the women's team kumite event. In 2021, she competed in the women's +68 kg event at the World Karate Championships held in Dubai, United Arab Emirates.

She won the gold medal in the women's +68 kg event at the 2023 World Karate Championships held in Budapest, Hungary. She defeated María Torres of Spain in her gold medal match. She also won the silver medal in the women's team kumite event.

== Achievements ==
Year	Competition	Venue	Rank	Event
2017	Asian Championships	Astana, Kazakhstan	3rd	Team kumite
2018	Asian Championships	Amman, Jordan	1st	Team kumite
2018	World Championships	Madrid, Spain	2nd	Team kumite
2019	Asian Championships	Tashkent, Uzbekistan	2nd	Team kumite
2022	Asian Championships	Tashkent, Uzbekistan	3rd	Team kumite
2023	World Championships	Budapest, Hungary	1st	Kumite +68 kg
2023	World Championships	Budapest, Hungary	2nd	Team kumite
