= Karate at the 2023 European Games – Women's kumite +68 kg =

Women's kumite +68 kg at the 2023 European Games
- Venue: Bielsko-Biała Arena
- Date: 23 June
- Competitors: 8 from 8 nations

Medalists
gold medal	Johanna Kneer	Germany
silver medal	Clio Ferracuti	Italy
bronze medal	Kyriaki Kydonaki	Greece
bronze medal	María Torres	Spain

The women's kumite +68 kg competition at the 2023 European Games was held on 23 June 2023 at the Bielsko-Biała Arena.

== Results ==
=== Elimination round ===
Pool A

Pos	Athlete	B	W	D	D^{0}	L	Pts	Score	(Italy)	(Spain)	(Croatia)	(Azerbaijan)
1	Clio Ferracuti (ITA)	3	2	0	0	1	6 (Note: Ferracuti (ITA) 1–1, Torres (ESP) 1–1, Lesjak (CRO) 1–1. Scores obtained: Ferracuti 10, Torres 8, Lesjak 6. Torres 2–0 Lesjak.)	10–6	—	5–2	1–2	4–2
2	María Torres (ESP)	3	2	0	0	1	6	8–7	2–5	—	2–0	4–2
3	Lucija Lesjak (CRO)	3	2	0	0	1	6	6–3	2–1	0–2	—	4–0
4	Farida Aliyeva (AZE)	3	0	0	0	3	0	4–12	2–4	2–4	0–4	—

Source: EG2023
Notes:

Pool B

Pos	Athlete	B	W	D	D^{0}	L	Pts	Score	(Germany)	(Greece)	(Finland)	(Poland)
1	Johanna Kneer (GER)	3	3	0	0	0	9	10–2	—	4–2	1–0	5–0
2	Kyriaki Kydonaki (GRE)	3	2	0	0	1	6	10–5	2–4	—	1–0	7–1
3	Titta Keinänen (FIN)	3	1	0	0	2	3	3–4	0–1	0–1	—	3–2
4	Julia Daniszewska (POL)	3	0	0	0	3	0	3–15	0–5	1–7	2–3	—

Source: EG2023

=== Finals ===
Semifinals
Kyriaki Kydonaki (GRE)	2
Clio Ferracuti (ITA)	3
María Torres (ESP)	2
Johanna Kneer (GER)	7

Gold medal bout
Clio Ferracuti (ITA)	5
Johanna Kneer (GER)	5
