= Karate at the 2022 World Games – Women's kumite +68 kg =

Women's kumite +68 kg at the 2022 World Games
- Venue: Bill Battle Coliseum
- Location: Birmingham, United States
- Dates: 9 July
- Competitors: 8 from 8 nations

Medalists
gold medal	Sofya Berultseva	Kazakhstan
silver medal	María Torres	Spain
bronze medal	Chehinez Jemi	Tunisia

The women's kumite +68 kg competition in karate at the 2022 World Games took place on 9 July 2022 at the Bill Battle Coliseum in Birmingham, United States.

== Results ==
=== Elimination round ===
==== Pool A ====
Pos	Athlete	B	W	D	L	Pts	Score	(Finland)	(Tunisia)	(Greece)	(Egypt)
1	Titta Keinänen (FIN)	3	3	0	0	6	7–1	—	3–1	3–0	1–0
2	Chehinez Jemi (TUN)	3	1	1	1	3	7–6	1–3	—	1–1	5–2
3	Eleni Chatziliadou (GRE)	3	1	1	1	3	4–5	0–3	1–1	—	3–1
4	Menna Shaaban Okila (EGY)	3	0	0	3	0	3–9	0–1	2–5	1–3	—

Source: Birmingham 2022

==== Pool B ====
Pos	Athlete	B	W	D	L	Pts	Score	(Kazakhstan)	(Spain)	(United States)	(Czech Republic)
1	Sofya Berultseva (KAZ)	3	3	0	0	6	14–9	—	7–7	4–1	3–1
2	María Torres (ESP)	3	2	0	1	4	16–7	7–7	—	4–0	5–0
3	Cirrus Lingl (USA)	3	1	0	2	2	4–9	1–4	0–4	—	3–1
4	Martina Šáchová (CZE)	3	0	0	3	0	2–11	1–3	0–5	1–3	—

Source: Birmingham 2022

=== Finals ===
Semi-finals
Titta Keinänen (FIN)	0
María Torres (ESP)	2
Sofya Berultseva (KAZ)	3
Chehinez Jemi (TUN)	1

Gold medal bout
María Torres (ESP)	1
Sofya Berultseva (KAZ)	7
Bronze medal bout
Titta Keinänen (FIN)	0
Chehinez Jemi (TUN)	1
