= Kyriaki Kydonaki =

Greek karateka (born 2001)

Personal information
- Born: 7 February 2001 (age 25)

Sport
- Country: Greece
- Sport: Karate
- Weight class: +68 kg
- Event: Kumite
Medal record
Women's karate
Representing Greece
World Championships
| Bronze medal – third place | 2025 Cairo | Kumite +68 kg |
European Games
| Bronze medal – third place | 2023 Kraków-Małopolska | Kumite +68 kg |
European Championships
| Gold medal – first place | 2025 Yerevan | Kumite +68 kg |
| Bronze medal – third place | 2022 Gaziantep | Kumite +68 kg |
Mediterranean Games
| Gold medal – first place | 2022 Oran | Kumite +68 kg |

Kyriaki Kydonaki (born 7 February 2001) is a Greek karateka. She is a gold medalist at the Mediterranean Games and the European Karate Championships. She is also a bronze medalist at the World Karate Championships and the European Games.

== Career ==
Kydonaki competed in the girls' +59 kg event at the 2018 Summer Youth Olympics held in Buenos Aires, Argentina. She was eliminated in the elimination round and she did not advance to the semi-finals.

In 2022, Kydonaki won one of the bronze medals in the women's +68 kg event at the European Karate Championships held in Gaziantep, Turkey. She defeated Lucija Lesjak of Croatia in her bronze medal match. A month later, she won the gold medal in the women's +68 kg event at the 2022 Mediterranean Games held in Oran, Algeria. In the final, she defeated Milena Jovanović of Montenegro.

Kydonaki competed in the women's +68 kg event at the 2023 European Karate Championships held in Guadalajara, Spain. She won one of the bronze medals in the women's +68 kg event at the 2023 European Games held in Poland. In the same year, she competed in the women's +68 kg event at the World Karate Championships held in Budapest, Hungary. She won her first match and she was then eliminated by eventual bronze medalist Clio Ferracuti of Italy.

Kydonaki won the gold medal in the women's +68 kg event at the 2025 European Karate Championships held in Yerevan, Armenia. She defeated Dariia Bulay of Ukraine in her gold medal match.

She competed in the women's +68 kg event at the 2026 Mediterranean Games held in Taranto, Italy.

== Achievements ==
| Year | Competition | Venue | Rank | Event |
|---|---|---|---|---|
| 2022 | European Championships | Gaziantep, Turkey | 3rd | Kumite +68 kg |
| 2022 | Mediterranean Games | Oran, Algeria | 1st | Kumite +68 kg |
| 2023 | European Games | Kraków and Małopolska, Poland | 3rd | Kumite +68 kg |
| 2025 | European Championships | Yerevan, Armenia | 1st | Kumite +68 kg |
| 2025 | World Championships | Cairo, Egypt | 3rd | Kumite +68 kg |
