= Karate at the 2019 European Games – Women's kumite +68 kg =

Women's kumite +68 kg at the 2019 European Games
- Venue: Čyžoŭka-Arena
- Date: 29 June
- Competitors: 8 from 8 nations

Medalists
gold medal	Laura Palacio	Spain
silver medal	Meltem Hocaoğlu	Turkey
bronze medal	Titta Keinänen	Finland
bronze medal	Eleni Chatziliadou	Greece

The women's kumite +68 kg competition at the 2019 European Games in Minsk was held on 29 June 2019 at the Čyžoŭka-Arena.

== Schedule ==
All times are local (UTC+3).

Date	Time	Event
Saturday, 29 June 2019	10:55	Elimination round
Saturday, 29 June 2019	16:31	Semifinals
Saturday, 29 June 2019	18:09	Final

== Results ==
=== Elimination round ===
==== Group A ====
Rank	Athlete	B	W	D	L	Pts	Score
1	Meltem Hocaoğlu (TUR)	3	2	1	0	5	7–0
2	Laura Palacio (ESP)	3	2	1	0	5	5–3
3	Katsiaryna Martynouskaya (BLR)	3	1	0	2	2	4–10
4	Nancy Garcia (FRA)	3	0	0	3	0	2–5

	Score	
Laura Palacio (ESP)	3–2	Katsiaryna Martynouskaya (BLR)
Meltem Hocaoğlu (TUR)	1–0	Nancy Garcia (FRA)
Meltem Hocaoğlu (TUR)	6–0	Katsiaryna Martynouskaya (BLR)
Laura Palacio (ESP)	2–1	Nancy Garcia (FRA)
Nancy Garcia (FRA)	1–2	Katsiaryna Martynouskaya (BLR)
Laura Palacio (ESP)	0–0	Meltem Hocaoğlu (TUR)

==== Group B ====
Rank	Athlete	B	W	D	L	Pts	Score
1	Eleni Chatziliadou (GRE)	3	2	1	0	5	6–0
2	Titta Keinänen (FIN)	3	1	2	0	4	3–0
3	Clio Ferracuti (ITA)	3	1	1	1	3	2–1
4	Hana Antunovic (SWE)	3	0	0	3	1	0–10

	Score	
Eleni Chatziliadou (GRE)	0–0	Titta Keinänen (FIN)
Clio Ferracuti (ITA)	2–0	Hana Antunovic (SWE)
Clio Ferracuti (ITA)	0–0	Titta Keinänen (FIN)
Eleni Chatziliadou (GRE)	5–0	Hana Antunovic (SWE)
Hana Antunovic (SWE)	0–3	Titta Keinänen (FIN)
Eleni Chatziliadou (GRE)	1–0	Clio Ferracuti (ITA)

=== Finals ===
Semifinals
Meltem Hocaoğlu (TUR)	0
Titta Keinänen (FIN)	0
Eleni Chatziliadou (GRE)	1
Laura Palacio (ESP)	4

Final
Meltem Hocaoğlu (TUR)	1
Laura Palacio (ESP)	4
