= 2025 World Karate Championships =

Karate event in Cairo

27th Karate World Championships
- Venue: Cairo Stadium Indoor Halls Complex
- Location: Cairo, Egypt
- Dates: 27–30 November
- Competitors: 378 from 86 nations

The 2025 World Karate Championships was held from 27 to 30 November 2025 in Cairo, Egypt with qualification for first time.

== Medal table ==
* Host nation (Egypt)

Rank	Nation	Gold	Silver	Bronze	Total
1	Egypt*	3	0	1	4
2	Iran	1	1	1	3
2	Italy	1	1	1	3
2	Japan	1	1	1	3
2	Turkey	1	1	1	3
6	Jordan	1	0	1	2
6	Uzbekistan	1	0	1	2
8	France	1	0	0	1
8	Germany	1	0	0	1
8	Hong Kong	1	0	0	1
11	Kazakhstan	0	1	2	3
12	Ukraine	0	1	1	2
13	China	0	1	0	1
13	Kosovo	0	1	0	1
13	Malaysia	0	1	0	1
13	Morocco	0	1	0	1
13	Puerto Rico	0	1	0	1
13	Slovakia	0	1	0	1
19	Greece	0	0	2	2
20	Algeria	0	0	1	1
20	Armenia	0	0	1	1
20	Azerbaijan	0	0	1	1
20	Chile	0	0	1	1
20	Croatia	0	0	1	1
20	England	0	0	1	1
20	Saudi Arabia	0	0	1	1
20	Tunisia	0	0	1	1
20	United States	0	0	1	1
20	Venezuela	0	0	1	1
20	World Karate Federation-1	0	0	1	1
20	World Karate Federation-2	0	0	1	1
Totals (31 entries)		12	12	24	48

== Medalists ==
=== Men ===
Event	Gold	Silver	Bronze
Kata	Kakeru Nishiyama; Japan	Alessio Ghinami; Italy	Ariel Torres; United States
Kata	Kakeru Nishiyama; Japan	Alessio Ghinami; Italy	Enes Özdemir; Turkey
Kumite −60 kg	Eray Şamdan; Turkey	Islam Selmani; Kosovo	Christos-Stefanos Xenos; Greece
Kumite −60 kg	Eray Şamdan; Turkey	Islam Selmani; Kosovo	Hiromu Hashimoto; Japan
Kumite −67 kg	Afeef Ghaith; Jordan	Said Oubaya; Morocco	Abdul Vakhkhob Rashidov; Uzbekistan
Kumite −67 kg	Afeef Ghaith; Jordan	Said Oubaya; Morocco	Didar Amirali; Kazakhstan
Kumite −75 kg	Abdalla Abdelaziz; Egypt	Andrii Zaplitnyi; Ukraine	Ernest Sharafutdinov; World Karate Federation-1
Kumite −75 kg	Abdalla Abdelaziz; Egypt	Andrii Zaplitnyi; Ukraine	Suren Harutyunyan; Armenia
Kumite −84 kg	Youssef Badawy; Egypt	Hasan Arslan; Turkey	Mohammad Al-Jafari; Jordan
Kumite −84 kg	Youssef Badawy; Egypt	Hasan Arslan; Turkey	Ivan Kvesić; Croatia
Kumite +84 kg	Matteo Avanzini; Italy	Saleh Abazari; Iran	Sanad Sufyani; Saudi Arabia
Kumite +84 kg	Matteo Avanzini; Italy	Saleh Abazari; Iran	Ivan Kudzinau; World Karate Federation-2

=== Women ===
Event	Gold	Silver	Bronze
Kata	Grace Lau; Hong Kong	Maho Ono; Japan	Terryana D'Onofrio; Italy
Kata	Grace Lau; Hong Kong	Maho Ono; Japan	Aya Hesham; Egypt
Kumite −50 kg	Gulshan Alimardanova; Uzbekistan	Shahmalarani Chandran; Malaysia	Yorgelis Salazar; Venezuela
Kumite −50 kg	Gulshan Alimardanova; Uzbekistan	Shahmalarani Chandran; Malaysia	Sara Bahmanyar; Iran
Kumite −55 kg	Ahlam Youssef; Egypt	Nina Kvasnicová; Slovakia	Anzhelika Terliuga; Ukraine
Kumite −55 kg	Ahlam Youssef; Egypt	Nina Kvasnicová; Slovakia	Louiza Abouriche; Algeria
Kumite −61 kg	Atousa Golshadnejad; Iran	Gong Li; China	Assel Kanay; Kazakhstan
Kumite −61 kg	Atousa Golshadnejad; Iran	Gong Li; China	Wafa Mahjoub; Tunisia
Kumite −68 kg	Thalya Sombé; France	Janessa Fonseca; Puerto Rico	Anastasiia Velozo; Chile
Kumite −68 kg	Thalya Sombé; France	Janessa Fonseca; Puerto Rico	Irina Zaretska; Azerbaijan
Kumite +68 kg	Johanna Kneer; Germany	Sofya Berultseva; Kazakhstan	Rochelle Walters; England
Kumite +68 kg	Johanna Kneer; Germany	Sofya Berultseva; Kazakhstan	Kyriaki Kydonaki; Greece

== Participating nations ==
378 athletes from 88 nations participated:

1. Albania (2)
2. Algeria (11)
3. Angola (3)
4. Argentina (2)
5. Armenia (2)
6. Aruba (1)
7. Australia (12)
8. Austria (3)
9. Azerbaijan (6)
10. Belgium (6)
11. Benin (1)
12. Bosnia and Herzegovina (2)
13. Brazil (6)
14. Bulgaria (2)
15. Burkina Faso (2)
16. Burundi (2)
17. Cameroon (2)
18. Canada (4)
19. Chile (9)
20. China (4)
21. Chinese Taipei (5)
22. Colombia (6)
23. Croatia (5)
24. Czech Republic (2)
25. Dominican Republic (4)
26. Ecuador (4)
27. Egypt (12)
28. El Salvador (2)
29. England (2)
30. France (10)
31. Georgia (4)
32. Germany (8)
33. Greece (9)
34. Guatemala (5)
35. Guinea (1)
36. Hong Kong (5)
37. Hungary (2)
38. India (5)
39. Iran (10)
40. Italy (12)
41. Japan (12)
42. Jordan (5)
43. Kazakhstan (8)
44. Kosovo (3)
45. Kuwait (2)
46. Kyrgyzstan (1)
47. Latvia (2)
48. Libya (2)
49. Luxembourg (2)
50. Malaysia (3)
51. Mexico (4)
52. Moldova (1)
53. Montenegro (4)
54. Morocco (8)
55. Nepal (2)
56. Netherlands (5)
57. New Zealand (6)
58. Nigeria (5)
59. North Macedonia (2)
60. Philippines (1)
61. Poland (3)
62. Portugal (6)
63. Puerto Rico (1)
64. Romania (4)
65. Rwanda (1)
66. Saudi Arabia (5)
67. Scotland (1)
68. Senegal (2)
69. Serbia (3)
70. Singapore (1)
71. Slovakia (6)
72. Slovenia (1)
73. South Africa (4)
74. South Korea (1)
75. Spain (6)
76. Sweden (5)
77. Switzerland (4)
78. Thailand (1)
79. Tunisia (5)
80. Turkey (9)
81. Ukraine (9)
82. United States (6)
83. Uzbekistan (8)
84. Venezuela (4)
85. WKF Team 1 (6)
86. WKF Team 2 (3)

== Para Karate ==
=== Medal table ===
* Host nation (Egypt)

Rank	Nation	Gold	Silver	Bronze	Total
1	Egypt*	4	1	4	9
2	Italy	1	2	1	4
3	Croatia	1	0	1	2
4	France	1	0	0	1
4	Hungary	1	0	0	1
6	Japan	0	1	1	2
6	Spain	0	1	1	2
6	Turkey	0	1	1	2
9	Slovakia	0	1	0	1
9	Ukraine	0	1	0	1
11	Germany	0	0	2	2
12	Azerbaijan	0	0	1	1
12	Canada	0	0	1	1
12	Kazakhstan	0	0	1	1
12	Mexico	0	0	1	1
12	Romania	0	0	1	1
Totals (16 entries)		8	8	16	32

=== Men ===
Event	Gold	Silver	Bronze
K-10	Nohan Dudon; France	Imai Toshihiro; Japan	José Carreón; Mexico
K-10	Nohan Dudon; France	Imai Toshihiro; Japan	Dorin Alexe; Romania
K-21	Ahmed El-Beltagy; Egypt	Carlos Huertas; Spain	Albert Singer; Germany
K-21	Ahmed El-Beltagy; Egypt	Carlos Huertas; Spain	Mike Richter; Germany
K-22	Mattia Allesina; Italy	Patrick Buwalda; Italy	Stipe Barić; Croatia
K-22	Mattia Allesina; Italy	Patrick Buwalda; Italy	Abdelrahman El-Sherif; Egypt
K-30	Abdelaziz Abouelnaga; Egypt	Berkay Uslu; Turkey	Pietro Merlo; Italy
K-30	Abdelaziz Abouelnaga; Egypt	Berkay Uslu; Turkey	Vidadi Khaligov; Azerbaijan

=== Women ===
Event	Gold	Silver	Bronze
K-10	Rewan Alamir; Egypt	Marwa Hasany; Egypt	Aiko Kogure; Japan
K-10	Rewan Alamir; Egypt	Marwa Hasany; Egypt	Lyazzat Zhussupova; Kazakhstan
K-21	Olívia Kákosy; Hungary	Federica Yakymashko; Italy	Lucía Sánchez; Spain
K-21	Olívia Kákosy; Hungary	Federica Yakymashko; Italy	Judy Halawa; Egypt
K-22	Daniela Topić; Croatia	Lucia Vlková; Slovakia	Natalie Olson; Canada
K-22	Daniela Topić; Croatia	Lucia Vlková; Slovakia	Salma Alaaeldin Ebrahim; Egypt
K-30	Fatma Mahmoud; Egypt	Knarik Airapetian; Ukraine	Nesrin Cavadzade; Turkey
K-30	Fatma Mahmoud; Egypt	Knarik Airapetian; Ukraine	Jana Radwan; Egypt

=== Participating nations ===
115 athletes from 31 nations participated:

1. Australia (1)
2. Azerbaijan (5)
3. Bosnia and Herzegovina (1)
4. Canada (3)
5. Chile (7)
6. Croatia (7)
7. Czech Republic (1)
8. Egypt (24)
9. England (1)
10. France (5)
11. Germany (4)
12. Greece (1)
13. Hong Kong (1)
14. Hungary (9)
15. India (2)
16. Iran (6)
17. Italy (6)
18. Japan (3)
19. Kazakhstan (3)
20. Mexico (1)
21. Netherlands (1)
22. Portugal (1)
23. Romania (1)
24. Saudi Arabia (2)
25. Slovakia (1)
26. Slovenia (1)
27. Spain (4)
28. Turkey (2)
29. Ukraine (1)
30. United States (6)
31. WKF Team 1 (4)
