= Johanna Kneer =

German karateka (born 1997)

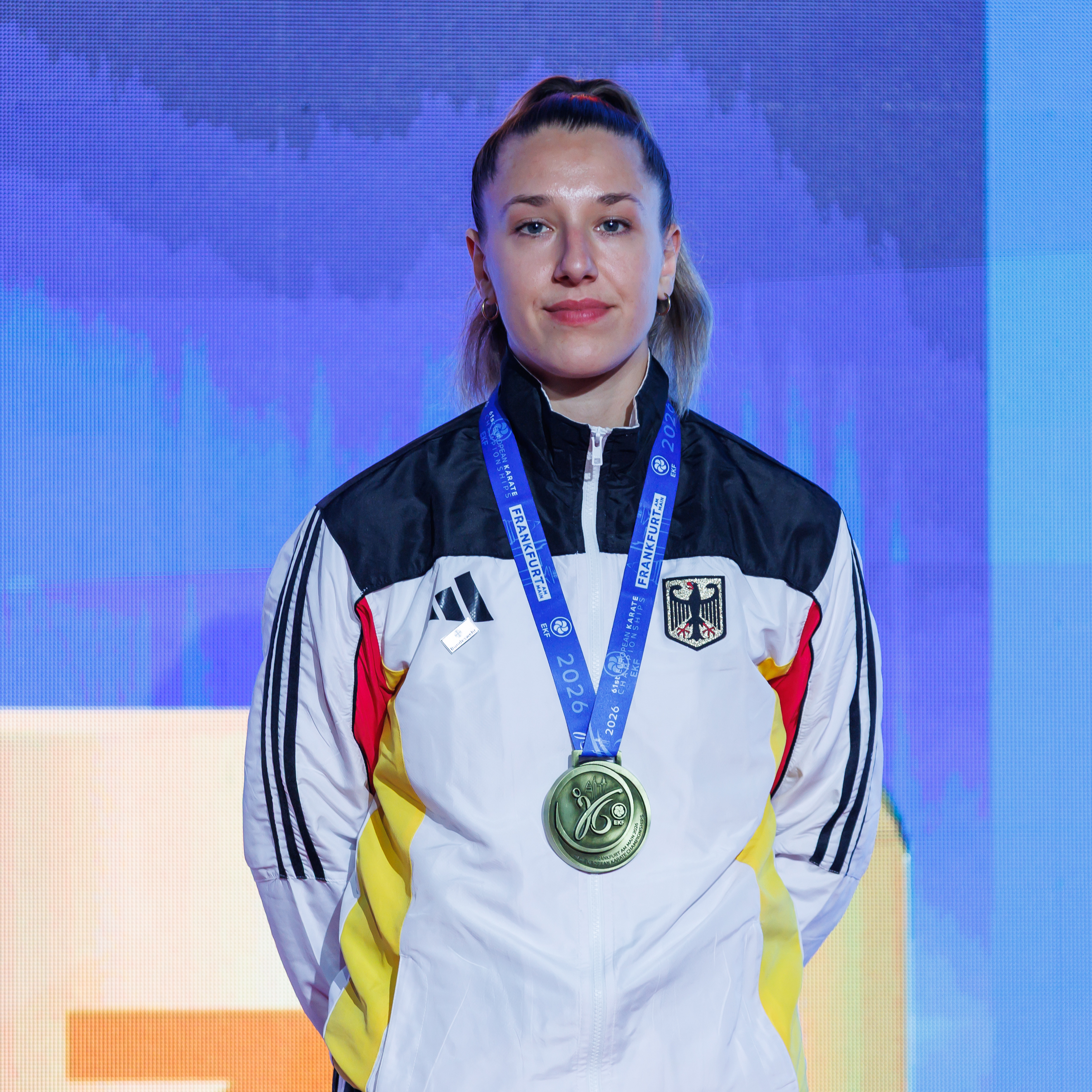

Personal information
- Born: 25 December 1997 (age 28)
- Home town: Ravensburg

Sport
- Country: Germany
- Sport: Karate
- Weight class: +68 kg
- Rank: two in the world
- Events: Kumite; Team kumite
- Club: KJC Ravensburg
Medal record
Women's karate
Representing Germany
World Games
| Gold medal – first place | 2025 Chengdu | Kumite +68 kg |
World Championships
| Gold medal – first place | 2025 Cairo | Kumite +68 kg |
European Games
| Gold medal – first place | 2023 Kraków-Małopolska | Kumite +68 kg |
European Championships
| Gold medal – first place | 2021 Poreč | Team kumite |
| Gold medal – first place | 2023 Guadalajara | Kumite +68 kg |
| Gold medal – first place | 2023 Guadalajara | Team kumite |
| Gold medal – first place | 2024 Zadar | Kumite +68 kg |
| Gold medal – first place | 2024 Zadar | Team kumite |
| Gold medal – first place | 2025 Yerevan | Team kumite |
| Gold medal – first place | 2026 Frankfurt | Team kumite |
| Bronze medal – third place | 2016 Montpellier | Kumite 68 kg |
| Bronze medal – third place | 2019 Guadalajara | Team kumite |
| Bronze medal – third place | 2026 Frankfurt | Kumite +68 kg |

Johanna Kneer (born 25 December 1997) is a German karateka and current number two in the world. She is a two-time gold medalist in the women's +68 kg event at the European Karate Championships. She also won the gold medal in the women's +68 kg event at the 2023 European Games held in Poland.

== Career ==
In June 2021, Kneer competed at the World Olympic Qualification Tournament held in Paris, France hoping to qualify for the 2020 Summer Olympics in Tokyo, Japan. In November 2021, she competed in the women's +68 kg event at the World Karate Championships held in Dubai, United Arab Emirates where she was eliminated in her first match.

In 2023, Kneer won the gold medal in the women's +68 kg event at the European Karate Championships held in Guadalajara, Spain. She competed in the women's +68 kg event at the 2023 World Karate Championships held in Budapest, Hungary. She was eliminated in the repechage by Chehinez Jemi of Tunisia.

Kneer won the gold medal in the women's +68 kg event at the 2024 European Karate Championships held in Zadar, Croatia. She also won the gold medal in the women's team kumite event.

She won the gold medal in the women's +68 kg event at the 2025 World Games held in Chengdu, China. She defeated María Torres of Spain in her gold medal match.

== Achievements ==
| Year | Competition | Venue | Rank | Event |
|---|---|---|---|---|
| 2016 | European Championships | Montpellier, France | 3rd | Kumite 68 kg |
| 2019 | European Championships | Guadalajara, Spain | 3rd | Team kumite |
| 2021 | European Championships | Poreč, Croatia | 1st | Team kumite |
| 2023 | European Championships | Guadalajara, Spain | 1st | Kumite +68 kg |
| 2023 | European Championships | Guadalajara, Spain | 1st | Team kumite |
| 2023 | European Games | Kraków and Małopolska, Poland | 1st | Kumite +68 kg |
| 2024 | European Championships | Zadar, Croatia | 1st | Kumite +68 kg |
| 2024 | European Championships | Zadar, Croatia | 1st | Team kumite |
| 2025 | European Championships | Yerevan, Armenia | 1st | Team kumite |
| 2025 | World Games | Chengdu, China | 1st | Kumite +68 kg |
| 2025 | World Championships | Cairo, Egypt | 1st | Kumite +68 kg |
| 2026 | European Championships | Frankfurt, Germany | 3rd | Kumite +68 kg |
| 2026 | European Championships | Frankfurt, Germany | 1st | Team kumite |
