= Menna Shaaban Okila =

Egyptian karateka (born 2000)

Personal information
- Born: 25 May 2000 (age 26)

Sport
- Country: Egypt
- Sport: Karate
- Weight class: +68 kg
- Events: Kumite; Team kumite
Medal record
Women's karate
Representing Egypt
Event	1st	2nd	3rd
World Championships	1	1	1
African Games	2	1	0
African Karate Championships	1	0	3
Total	4	2	4
World Championships
Gold medal – first place	2021 Dubai	Team kumite
Silver medal – second place	2021 Dubai	Kumite +68 kg
Bronze medal – third place	2023 Budapest	Kumite +68 kg
African Games
Gold medal – first place	2023 Accra	Kumite +68 kg
Gold medal – first place	2023 Accra	Team kumite
Silver medal – second place	2019 Rabat	Kumite +68 kg
African Karate Championships
Gold medal – first place	2021 Cairo	Team kumite
Bronze medal – third place	2019 Gaborone	Kumite +68 kg
Bronze medal – third place	2020 Tangier	Team kumite
Bronze medal – third place	2021 Cairo	Kumite +68 kg

Menna Shaaban Okila (born 25 May 2000) is an Egyptian karateka. She won the silver medal in the women's +68 kg event at the 2021 World Karate Championships held in Dubai, United Arab Emirates. She also won the gold medal in the women's team kumite event.

== Career ==
Okila won one of the bronze medals in her event at the 2019 African Karate Championships held in Gaborone, Botswana. She represented Egypt at the African Games held in Rabat, Morocco and she won the silver medal in the women's kumite +68 kg event.

In October 2021, Okila won the gold medal in her event at the 2021 Mediterranean Karate Championships held in Limassol, Cyprus. In December 2021, she won one of the bronze medals in her event at the 2021 African Karate Championships held in Cairo, Egypt. She also won the gold medal in the women's team kumite event.

Okila competed in the women's +68 kg event at the 2022 Mediterranean Games held in Oran, Algeria. She lost her first match against eventual silver medalist Milena Jovanović of Montenegro and she was then eliminated in the repechage by María Torres of Spain.

Okila competed in the women's kumite +68 kg event at the 2022 World Games held in Birmingham, United States. She lost each of her matches in the elimination round and she did not advance to the semi-finals. In 2023, Okila won one of the bronze medals in the women's +68 kg event at the World Karate Championships held in Budapest, Hungary. She defeated Chehinez Jemi of Tunisia in her bronze medal match.

In 2024, Okila won the gold medal in her event at the 2023 African Games held in Accra, Ghana.

== Achievements ==
Year	Competition	Venue	Rank	Event
2019	African Karate Championships	Gaborone, Botswana	3rd	Kumite +68 kg
2019	African Games	Rabat, Morocco	2nd	Kumite +68 kg
2020	African Karate Championships	Tangier, Morocco	3rd	Team kumite
2021	World Championships	Dubai, United Arab Emirates	2nd	Kumite +68 kg
2021	World Championships	Dubai, United Arab Emirates	1st	Team kumite
2021	African Karate Championships	Cairo, Egypt	3rd	Kumite +68 kg
2021	African Karate Championships	Cairo, Egypt	1st	Team kumite
2023	World Championships	Budapest, Hungary	3rd	Kumite +68 kg
2024	African Games	Accra, Ghana	1st	Kumite +68 kg
2024	African Games	Accra, Ghana	1st	Team kumite
