= Lucija Lesjak =

Croatian karateka (born 1999)

Personal information
- Born: 30 November 1999 (age 26)

Sport
- Country: Croatia
- Sport: Karate
- Weight class: +68 kg
- Events: Kumite; Team kumite
Medal record
Women's karate
Representing Croatia
World Championships
Bronze medal – third place	2021 Dubai	Kumite +68 kg
Bronze medal – third place	2023 Budapest	Team kumite
European Championships
Gold medal – first place	2022 Gaziantep	Team kumite
Silver medal – second place	2023 Guadalajara	Team kumite
Bronze medal – third place	2021 Poreč	Team kumite

Lucija Lesjak (born 30 November 1999) is a Croatian karateka. She won one of the bronze medals in the women's +68 kg event at the 2021 World Karate Championships held in Dubai, United Arab Emirates.

== Career ==
Lesjak won one of the bronze medals in the women's team kumite event at the 2021 European Karate Championships held in Poreč, Croatia. In June 2021, she competed at the World Olympic Qualification Tournament held in Paris, France hoping to qualify for the 2020 Summer Olympics in Tokyo, Japan.

Lesjak won the gold medal in the women's team kumite event at the 2022 European Karate Championships held in Gaziantep, Turkey. She also competed in the women's +68 kg event where she lost her bronze medal match against Kyriaki Kydonaki of Greece. She competed in the women's +68 kg event at the 2022 Mediterranean Games held in Oran, Algeria where she was eliminated in her first match.

Lesjak won the silver medal in the women's team kumite event at the 2023 European Karate Championships held in Guadalajara, Spain. She also competed in the women's +68 kg event. In the same year, she competed in the women's +68 kg event at the 2023 European Games held in Poland and at the 2023 World Karate Championships held in Budapest, Hungary. She won one of the bronze medals in the women's team kumite event at the 2023 World Karate Championships.

== Achievements ==
Year	Competition	Venue	Rank	Event
2021	European Championships	Poreč, Croatia	3rd	Team kumite
2021	World Championships	Dubai, United Arab Emirates	3rd	Kumite +68 kg
2022	European Championships	Gaziantep, Turkey	1st	Team kumite
2023	European Championships	Guadalajara, Spain	2nd	Team kumite
2023	World Championships	Budapest, Hungary	3rd	Team kumite
