= Sofya Berultseva =

Kazakhstani karateka (born 2000)

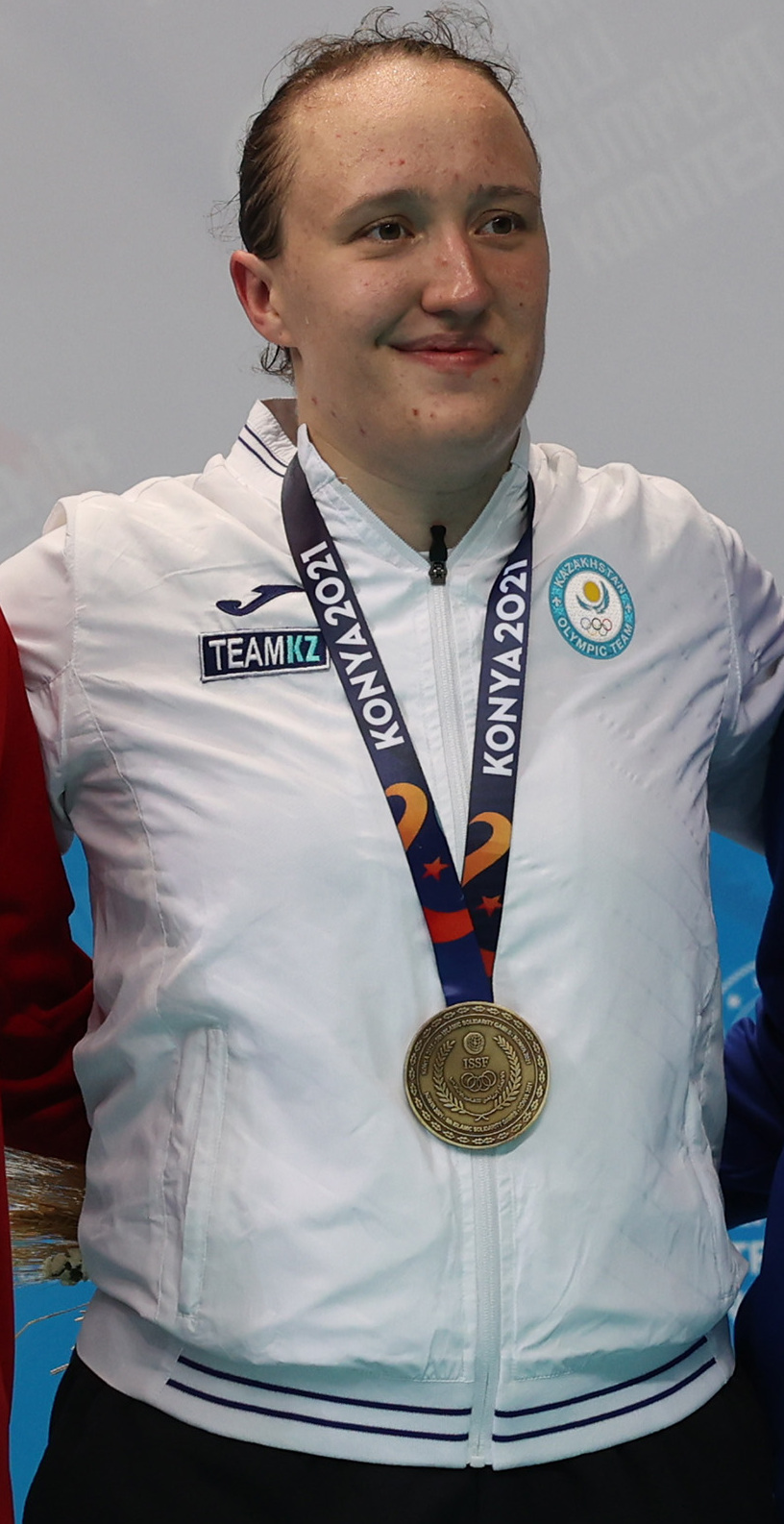
- Berultseva in 2022

Personal information
- Born: 6 November 2000 (age 26) Shymkent, Kazakhstan

Sport
- Country: Kazakhstan
- Sport: Karate
- Event: Kumite
- Team: Kazakhstan
Medal record
Women's karate
Representing Kazakhstan
Olympic Games
Bronze medal – third place	2020 Tokyo	Kumite +61 kg
World Championships
Silver medal – second place	2025 Cairo	Kumite +68 kg
Bronze medal – third place	2021 Dubai	Kumite +68 kg
World Games
Gold medal – first place	2022 Birmingham	Kumite +68 kg
Asian Games
Gold medal – first place	2022 Hangzhou	Kumite +68 kg
Gold medal – first place	2026 Aichi–Nagoya	Kumite +68 kg
Islamic Solidarity Games
Gold medal – first place	2021 Konya	Kumite +68 kg
Asian Championships
Gold medal – first place	2022 Tashkent	Team kumite
Gold medal – first place	2023 Malacca	Kumite +68 kg
Gold medal – first place	2025 Tashkent	Kumite +68 kg
Silver medal – second place	2019 Tashkent	Kumite +68 kg
Silver medal – second place	2021 Almaty	Kumite +68 kg
Silver medal – second place	2022 Tashkent	Kumite +68 kg
Silver medal – second place	2025 Tashkent	Team kumite
Bronze medal – third place	2021 Almaty	Team kumite

Sofya Berultseva (born 6 November 2000) is a Kazakhstani professional karateka Olympic bronze medallist, she represents Kazakhstan internationally at Kumite (Karate) events. She won a bronze medal in her event at the 2020 Summer Olympics in Tokyo, Japan and the 2021 World Karate Championships in Dubai, United Arab Emirates.

== Career ==
Berultseva has won several medals at Asian Karate Championships (Continental Championship) in individual kumite category and she also won several medals, including gold, in the World Karate Federation Karate 1 Leagues and Series Championships.

In 2021, she won gold medal in the Karate 1 Premier League Karate Championships held at Istanbul, Turkey.

Berultseva competed at the World Olympic Qualification Tournament held in Paris, France hoping to qualify for 2020 Summer Olympics in Tokyo, Japan. She did not qualify at this tournament but was able to qualify via Continental representation soon after.

Berultseva gained a bronze medal for Kazakhstan in Women's +61 kg Kumite Category at the karate competition of the 2020 Summer Olympics in Tokyo, Japan. Feryal Abdelaziz beat her, 5:4, to claim a place in the gold medal event against Azerbaijan's Irina Zaretska. Berultseva won a bronze medal as karate does not have a third place play-off match and the losing semi finalists both get a bronze medal.

In December 2021, Berultseva won the silver medal in her event at the Asian Karate Championships held in Almaty, Kazakhstan. She also won one of the bronze medals in the women's team kumite event.

Berultseva won the gold medal in the women's +68 kg event at the 2022 World Games held in Birmingham, United States. She defeated María Torres of Spain in her gold medal match. She also won the gold medal in her event at the 2021 Islamic Solidarity Games held in Konya, Turkey.

In 2023, she lost her bronze medal match in the women's +68 kg event at the World Karate Championships held in Budapest, Hungary. She also lost her bronze medal match in the women's +68 kg event at the 2025 World Games held in Chengdu, China.

== Achievements ==
Competition Records
YEAR	COMPETITION	VENUE	RANK/POSITION	EVENT
2021	Karate 1 Premier League	Lisbon Portugal	Participate	Female 68+ Kg Kumite
2021	Karate 1 Premier League	Istanbul Turkey	Gold	Female 68+ Kg Kumite
2020	Karate 1 Premier League	Salzburg Austria	Bronze	Female 68+ Kg Kumite
2020	Karate 1 Premier League	Dubai United Arab Emirates	5th	Female 68+ Kg Kumite
2020	Karate 1 Premier League	Paris France	Participate	Female 68+ Kg Kumite
2020	Karate 1 Series A	Santiago Chile	5th	Female 68+ Kg Kumite
2019	Karate 1 Premier League	Madrid Spain	Gold	Female 68+ Kg Kumite
2019	Karate 1 Premier League	Moscow ROC	Bronze	Female 68+ Kg Kumite
2019	Karate 1 Series A	Santiago Chile	5th	Female 68+ Kg Kumite
2019	Karate 1 Premier League	Tokyo ROC	Participate	Female 68+ Kg Kumite
2019	16th Senior Asian Karate Championship	Tashkent Uzbekistan	Silver	Female 68+ Kg Kumite
2019	Karate 1 Series A	Montreal Canada	Bronze	Female 68+ Kg Kumite
2019	Karate 1 Premier League	Shanghai China	Gold	Female 68+ Kg Kumite
2019	Karate 1 Series A	Istanbul Turkey	Bronze	Female 68+ Kg Kumite
2019	18th Cadet, Junior and Under21 Asian Karate Championship	Kota Kinabalu Malaysia	Silver	U-21 Kumite Female 68+ Kg
2019	Karate 1 Premier League	Rabat Morocco	Participate	Female 68+ Kg Kumite
2019	Karate 1 Series A	Salzburg Austria	Bronze	Female 68+ Kg Kumite
2019	Karate 1 Premier League	Dubai United Arab Emirates	Participate	Female 68+ Kg Kumite
2018	Karate1 Youth League	Sofia Bulgaria	Participate	Junior Kumite Female 59+ Kg
2017	10th World Junior, Cadet & Under 21 Karate Championships	Tenerife Spain	Gold	Junior Kumite Female 59+ Kg
2017	16th Asian Cadet, Junior & Under 21 Karate Championships	Astana Kazakhstan	Gold	Junior Kumite Female 59+ Kg
2017	10th WKF Training Camp & Karate 1 Youth Cup	Umag Croatia	Bronze	Junior Kumite Female 59+ Kg
2016	15th Asian Cadet, Junior & Under 21 Karate Championships	Jakarta Indonesia	Gold	Junior Kumite Female 59+ Kg
