= Cirrus Lingl =

American karateka (born 1998)

Personal information
- Born: November 2, 1998 (age 27)

Sport
- Country: United States
- Sport: Karate
- Weight class: +68 kg
- Event: Kumite
Medal record
Women's karate
Representing United States
Pan American Games
Bronze medal – third place	2019 Lima	Kumite +68 kg

Cirrus Lingl (born November 2, 1998) is an American karateka. She won one of the bronze medals in the women's kumite +68 kg event at the 2019 Pan American Games held in Lima, Peru.

== Career ==
In June 2021, Lingl competed at the World Olympic Qualification Tournament held in Paris, France hoping to qualify for the 2020 Summer Olympics in Tokyo, Japan. In November 2021, she competed in the women's +68 kg event at the World Karate Championships held in Dubai, United Arab Emirates.

She competed in the women's kumite +68 kg event at the 2022 World Games held in Birmingham, United States. She finished in third place in her pool in the elimination round and she did not advance to compete in the semi-finals.

Lingl started learning karate at age seven at the Illinois Shotokan Karate Club. Her sister Skylar Lingl also competes in karate.

== Achievements ==
Year	Competition	Venue	Rank	Event
2019	Pan American Games	Lima, Peru	3rd	Kumite +68 kg
