= Chehinez Jemi =

Tunisian karateka (born 1997)

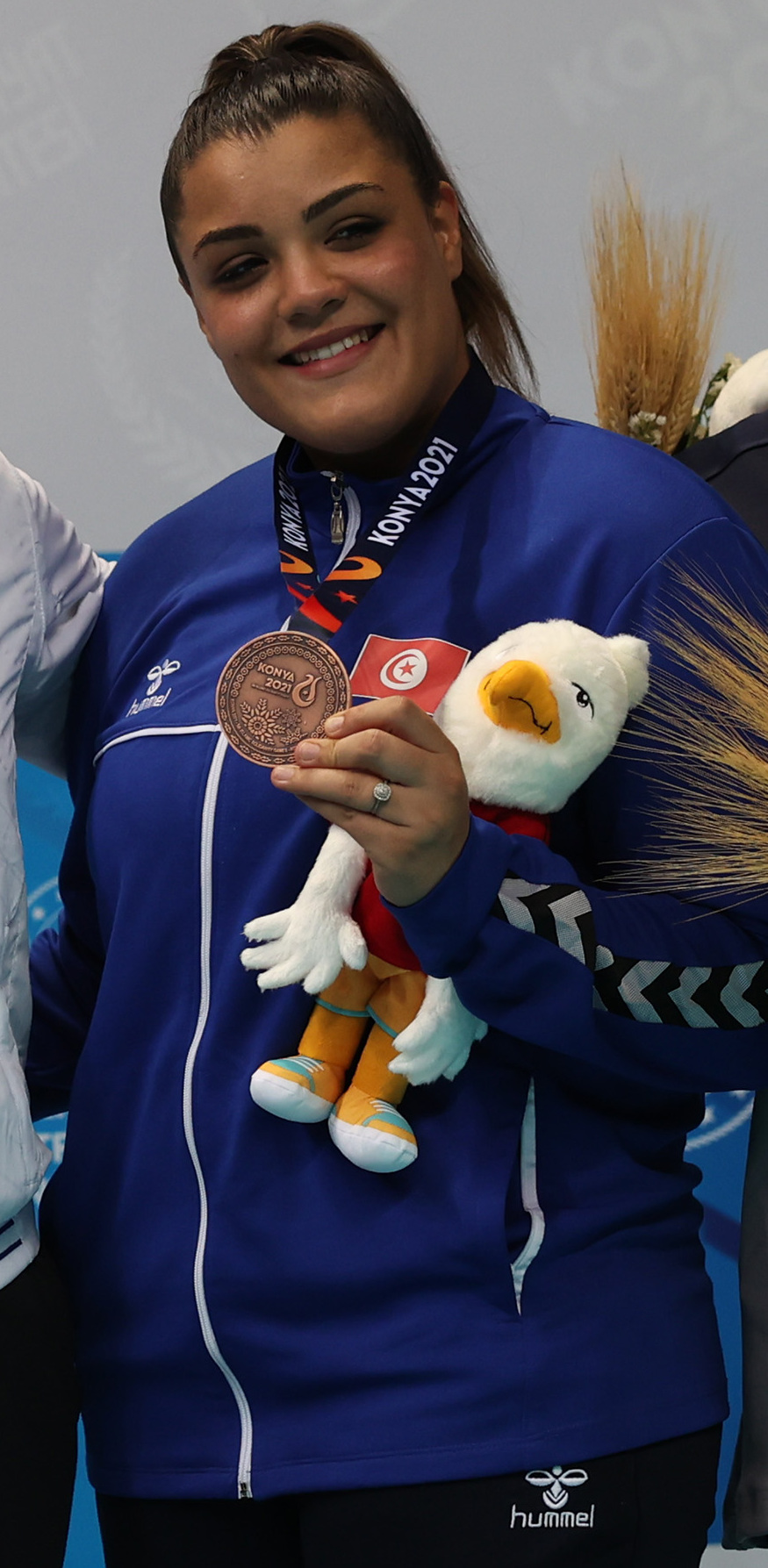
- Jemi in 2021

Personal information
- Born: 29 April 1997 (age 29)

Sport
- Country: Tunisia
- Sport: Karate
- Weight class: +68 kg
- Event: Kumite
Medal record
Women's karate
Representing Tunisia
World Games
Bronze medal – third place	2022 Birmingham	Kumite +68 kg
African Games
Gold medal – first place	2019 Rabat	Kumite +68 kg
Bronze medal – third place	2023 Accra	Kumite +68 kg
Islamic Solidarity Games
Bronze medal – third place	2021 Konya	Kumite +68 kg
Mediterranean Games
Bronze medal – third place	2022 Oran	Kumite +68 kg

Chehinez Jemi (born 29 April 1997) is a Tunisian karateka. She won the gold medal in the women's +68 kg event at the 2019 African Games held in Rabat, Morocco.

== Career ==
She won the gold medal in her event at the 2019 African Karate Championships held in Gaborone, Botswana. She also won the silver medal in the women's team kumite event. She won the gold medal in the women's +68 kg event at the 2019 African Games held in Rabat, Morocco.

In June 2021, she competed at the World Olympic Qualification Tournament held in Paris, France hoping to qualify for the 2020 Summer Olympics in Tokyo, Japan. In November 2021, she competed in the women's +68 kg event at the World Karate Championships held in Dubai, United Arab Emirates where she was eliminated in her second match. In 2022, she won one of the bronze medals in the women's +68 kg event at the Mediterranean Games held in Oran, Algeria. She defeated María Torres of Spain in her bronze medal match.

She won the bronze medal in the women's +68 kg event at the 2022 World Games held in Birmingham, United States. She defeated Titta Keinänen of Finland in her bronze medal match. She won one of the bronze medals in the women's +68 kg event at the 2021 Islamic Solidarity Games held in Konya, Turkey.

In 2023, she lost her bronze medal match in the women's +68 kg event at the World Karate Championships held in Budapest, Hungary.

== Achievements ==
Year	Competition	Venue	Rank	Event
2019	African Games	Rabat, Morocco	1st	Kumite +68 kg
2022	Mediterranean Games	Oran, Algeria	3rd	Kumite +68 kg
2022	World Games	Birmingham, United States	3rd	Kumite +68 kg
2022	Islamic Solidarity Games	Konya, Turkey	3rd	Kumite +68 kg
2024	African Games	Accra, Ghana	3rd	Kumite +68 kg
