= Ivana Perović =

Serbian karate athlete

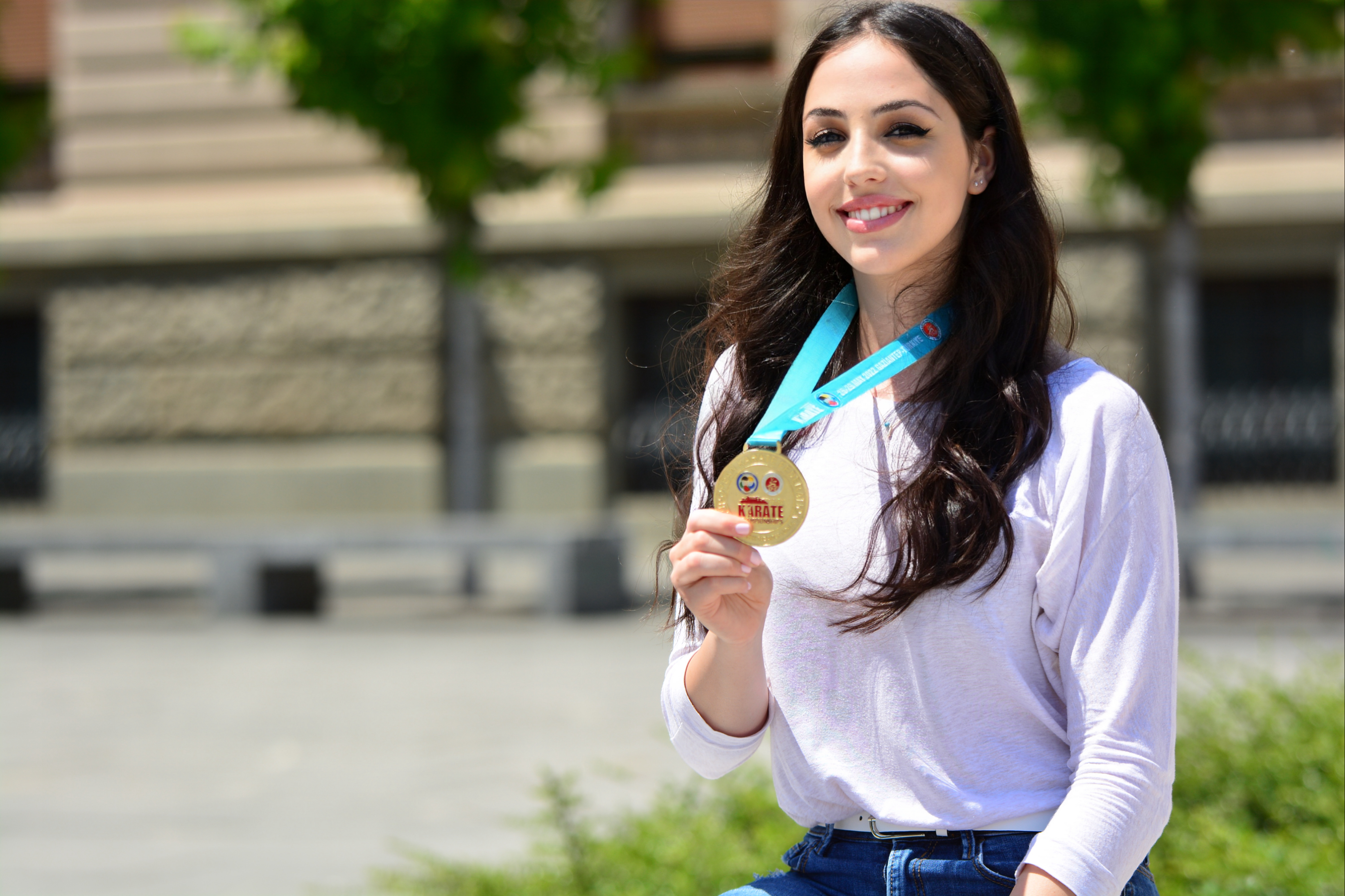
- Perović with her gold medal from the 2022 European Championships
- Born: 5 January 2002 (age 24); Belgrade, FR Yugoslavia
- Nationality: Serbia
- Division: +68 kg
- Style: Karate

Other information
- Notable clubs: Partizan, Belgrade

Ivana Perović (Serbian Cyrillic: Ивана Перовић; born 5 January 2002) is a Serbian karate athlete who competes in kumite. She won the gold medal in the women's +68 kg event at the 2022 European Karate Championships in Gaziantep, Turkey, was cadet world champion in 2017 and junior world champion in 2019, and took bronze at the 2018 Summer Youth Olympics in Buenos Aires, the first Olympic karate medal for Serbia. She is a member of the Partizan karate club in Belgrade.

== Career ==
=== Youth categories ===
Perović began practising karate at the age of five.

At the 10th World Cadet, Junior and U21 Championships, held from 25 to 30 October 2017 in Tenerife, Spain, she won the gold medal in the cadet −54 kg category, winning all six of her bouts by a combined score of 20:0 without conceding a single point. Having combined that title with gold at the youth World Cup in Umag earlier the same year, she reached the top of the world ranking list for the first time.

As the only female karateka from the former Yugoslavia to qualify for the 2018 Summer Youth Olympics in Buenos Aires, where karate made its Olympic debut, she won the bronze medal in the girls' −59 kg event, the first Olympic karate medal for Serbia. After two wins in the group stage, she lost her semifinal to Anna Chernysheva of Russia by judges' decision (0:0).

At the World Cadet, Junior and U21 Championships in Santiago, Chile, held from 23 to 27 October 2019, she became junior world champion in the −59 kg category, defeating opponents from Hungary, France, Spain and Slovenia before beating Nora Benedicte Handelsby of Norway 8:0 in the final. In November of the same year she won the traditional Top Ten international tournament in Zagreb, beating Nicole Bartha of Hungary 2:0 in the final. The Serbian Olympic Committee named her Serbia's most successful young sportswoman of 2019.

At the European Cadet, Junior and U21 Championships, held from 6 to 9 February 2020 in Budapest, she won the bronze medal in the U21 −61 kg category. At the European Cadet, Junior and U21 Championships in Prague in June 2022 she took silver in the U21 +68 kg category, and at the World Cadet, Junior and U21 Championships in Konya in October 2022 she finished fifth in the same category after losing the bronze-medal bout.

In youth categories she was a five-time champion of Serbia and a five-time Balkan champion. From 2020 to 2022 she served as one of the European Olympic Young Ambassadors in the programme of the European Olympic Committees.

=== Senior career ===
At the Balkan Senior Championships in March 2020 in Belgrade, she won the bronze medal in the −61 kg category.

Making her senior World Championships debut at the 2021 World Karate Championships in Dubai, she finished fifth in the women's +68 kg event, losing the bronze-medal bout.

At the 2022 European Karate Championships in Gaziantep, her first senior European championships, she won the gold medal in the women's +68 kg event. She defeated Lucija Lesjak of Croatia 1:0 in the semifinal and Aicha Boussebaa of Hungary 1:0 in the final on 28 May 2022. She also competed in the women's +68 kg event at the 2022 Mediterranean Games in Oran.

In September 2023, at the Karate1 Premier League event in Dublin, the first tournament of that rank held in Ireland, she defeated her Turkish opponent in the opening round and then suffered a serious knee injury in her bout against reigning world champion María Torres of Spain, which forced her to miss the 2023 World Karate Championships in Budapest.

Returning to competition in 2025, she won a team kumite bronze medal with Serbia at the Balkan Senior Championships in Budva, and then, on 17 May 2025 in Beočin, won the Serbian Cup in the individual +68 kg category along with the team kumite title with Partizan.

== Personal life ==
Perović studies at the Faculty of Organizational Sciences of the University of Belgrade.
