= Clio Ferracuti =

Italian karateka (born 1996)

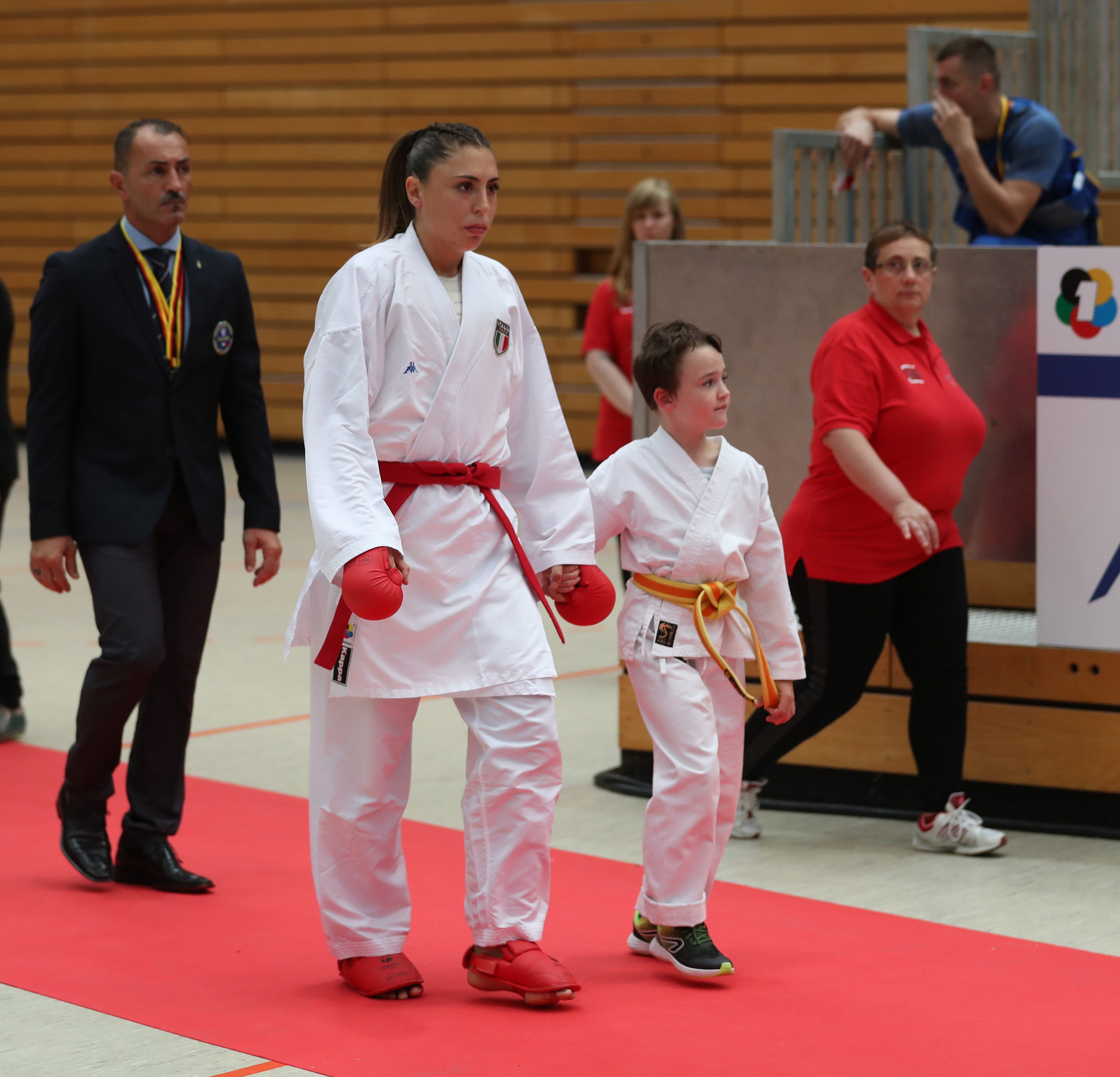
- Ferracuti in 2018

Personal information
- Born: 10 October 1996 (age 29)

Sport
- Country: Italy
- Sport: Karate
- Weight class: +68 kg
- Events: Kumite; Team kumite
Medal record
Women's karate
Representing Italy
World Games
Bronze medal – third place	2025 Chengdu	Kumite +68 kg
World Championships
Bronze medal – third place	2021 Dubai	Team kumite
Bronze medal – third place	2023 Budapest	Kumite +68 kg
European Games
Silver medal – second place	2023 Kraków-Małopolska	Kumite +68 kg
European Championships
Gold medal – first place	2026 Frankfurt	Kumite +68 kg
Silver medal – second place	2018 Novi Sad	Team kumite
Silver medal – second place	2024 Zadar	Team kumite
Bronze medal – third place	2019 Guadalajara	Team kumite
Bronze medal – third place	2021 Poreč	Team kumite
Bronze medal – third place	2023 Guadalajara	Kumite +68 kg
Bronze medal – third place	2023 Guadalajara	Team kumite
Bronze medal – third place	2025 Yerevan	Team kumite

Clio Ferracuti (born 10 October 1996) is an Italian karateka. She won the silver medal in the women's +68 kg event at the 2023 European Games held in Poland. She also won one of the bronze medals in her event at the 2023 European Karate Championships held in Guadalajara, Spain.

In 2019, Ferracuti competed in the women's +68 kg event at the European Games held in Minsk, Belarus.

In 2023, she won one of the bronze medals in the women's +68 kg event at the World Karate Championships held in Budapest, Hungary. She defeated Sofya Berultseva of Kazakhstan in her bronze medal match.

Ferracuti won the silver medal in the women's team kumite event at the 2024 European Karate Championships held in Zadar, Croatia. She also competed in the women's +68 kg event. Ferracuti won the bronze medal in the women's +68 kg event at the 2025 World Games held in Chengdu, China.

== Achievements ==
Year	Competition	Location	Rank	Event
2018	European Championships	Novi Sad, Serbia	2nd	Team kumite
2019	European Championships	Guadalajara, Spain	3rd	Team kumite
2021	European Championships	Poreč, Croatia	3rd	Team kumite
2021	World Championships	Dubai, United Arab Emirates	3rd	Team kumite
2023	European Championships	Guadalajara, Spain	3rd	Kumite +68 kg
2023	European Championships	Guadalajara, Spain	3rd	Team kumite
2023	European Games	Kraków and Małopolska, Poland	2nd	Kumite +68 kg
2023	World Championships	Budapest, Hungary	3rd	Kumite +68 kg
2024	European Championships	Zadar, Croatia	2nd	Team kumite
2025	European Championships	Yerevan, Armenia	3rd	Team kumite
2025	World Games	Chengdu, China	3rd	Kumite +68 kg
2026	European Championships	Frankfurt, Germany	1st	Kumite +68 kg
