= Titta Keinänen =

Finnish karateka (born 1993)

Personal information
- Born: 28 October 1993 (age 32)

Sport
- Country: Finland
- Sport: Karate
- Weight class: +68 kg
- Event: Kumite
Medal record
Women's karate
Representing Finland
European Championships
| Bronze medal – third place | 2019 Guadalajara | Kumite +68 kg |
European Games
| Bronze medal – third place | 2019 Minsk | Kumite +68 kg |

Titta Keinänen (born 28 October 1993) is a Finnish karateka. She is a bronze medalist in the women's kumite +68 kg event at the 2019 European Games and the 2019 European Karate Championships.

== Career ==
In 2016, Keinänen won one of the bronze medals in her event at the World University Karate Championships held in Braga, Portugal.

Keinänen won one of the bronze medals in the women's kumite +68 kg event at the 2019 European Karate Championships held in Guadalajara, Spain. In that same year, she won one of the bronze medals in the women's kumite +68 kg event at the 2019 European Games held in Minsk, Belarus.

In May 2021, Keinänen competed at the 2021 European Karate Championships in Poreč, Croatia, and was beaten in the quarterfinal by Fortesa Orana of Kosovo. In June 2021, Keinänen competed at the World Olympic Qualification Tournament held in Paris, France hoping to qualify for the 2020 Summer Olympics in Tokyo, Japan. In November 2021, she competed in the women's +68 kg event at the World Karate Championships held in Dubai, United Arab Emirates. She was eliminated in her fourth match by eventual bronze medalist Sofya Berultseva of Kazakhstan.

Keinänen lost her bronze medal match in the women's +68 kg event at the 2022 World Games held in Birmingham, United States. In 2023, she competed in the women's +68 kg event at the World Karate Championships held in Budapest, Hungary where she was eliminated in her second match.

Keinänen competes at competitions of the Karate1 Premier League.

== Achievements ==
| Year | Competition | Venue | Rank | Event |
|---|---|---|---|---|
| 2019 | European Championships | Guadalajara, Spain | 3rd | Kumite +68 kg |
| 2019 | European Games | Minsk, Belarus | 3rd | Kumite +68 kg |
