= Eleni Chatziliadou =

Greek karateka (born 1993)

Personal information
- Native name: Ελένη Χατζηλιάδου
- Born: 29 July 1993 (age 33)
- Home town: Katerini, Greece
- Education: Technological Educational Institute of Central Greece (BSc).; IEK Delta 360º.
- Height: 1.74 m (5 ft 9 in)
- Weight: 71 kg (157 lb)

Sport
- Country: Greece
- Sport: Karate
- Coached by: Maximos Chatziliadis
Medal record
Representing Greece
World Championships
Gold medal – first place	2018 Madrid	+68 kg
Silver medal – second place	2016 Linz	+68 kg
Bronze medal – third place	2012 Paris	+68 kg
European Games
Bronze medal – third place	2019 Minsk	+68 kg
European Championships
Silver medal – second place	2019 Guadalajara	+68 kg
Silver medal – second place	2018 Novi Sad	+68 kg
Bronze medal – third place	2021 Poreč	+68 kg
Mediterranean Games
Silver medal – second place	2018 Tarragona	+68 kg
Representing Germany
Karate1 Premier League
Bronze medal – third place	2017 Rotterdam	+68 kg

Eleni Chatziliadou (Greek: Ελένη Χατζηλιάδου, born July 29, 1993, in Katerini, Greece) is a Greek karateka won the gold medal in the women's kumite +68 kg event at the 2018 World Karate Championships held in Madrid, Spain. In the same year, she also won a silver medal at the 2018 Mediterranean Games and at 2018 European Karate Championships. In 2019, she won the silver medal in the women's kumite +68 kg event at the 2019 European Games held in Minsk, Belarus. She took the fifth place in the women's kumite +68 kg (over-68-kg kumite category) event at the 2021 Karate 1 Premier League in Lisbon, Portugal. As an athlete member of Karate Club Bushido Bonn, Bonn, represented the Germany, she won the bronze medal at the 2017 Karate1 Premier League held in Rotterdam. She won the bronze medal at the 2021 European Karate Championships held in Poreč, Croatia. Due she had some injury problems and missed a series of events, she did not qualify in being in the athletes of Greece at the 2020 Summer Olympics in Tokyo.

== Early life ==
She born into a karate family where her parents were karate athletes, while her younger sister Georgia is a karate athlete. Eleni Chatziliadou began karate at the age of five at her father's karate school Pierikos Team Karate (Πιερικός Αθλητικός Σύλλογος Καράτε) founded in 1986 in Katerini, also known as A.C.K. Pierikos Combat Sports (Πιερικός Σύλλογος Μαχητικών Αθλημάτων), has Shotokan Kobudo of Okinawa karate. His father has served as her karate instructor and as her coach.

She attended 2011‒2016 the Department of Physiotherapy of the Faculty of Health and Welfare of Technological Educational Institute of Central Greece graduating with a bachelor's degree in physical therapy, and in September 2015 as an Erasmus+ exchange student in Germany she started attending the six-month internship term of the bachelor's degree. From April 2017 to July 2018, as physical therapist she worked at the orthopaedic clinic Orthopädische Fachklinik Kurköln, Bad Neuenahr-Ahrweiler, Germany.

In 2018 she enrolled in the undergraduate programme of Department of Medicine of the Faculty of Health Sciences of Aristotle University of Thessaloniki. She attended 2020‒2022 the private institute of vocational training IEK Delta 360º in Thessaloniki for the 2-year journalism programme. Since August 2018, she became a professional athlete because karate has been included in the 2020 Olympic Games, which leads to begin her first sponsorship by Eren Hellas and other sponsors later.

== Honors ==
- Honored Collective Award with the 2021 National Women/Men Karate Team (she won the bronze medal in the European Karate Championships of 2021) on 5 May 2022 at the 2022 Annual Honorary Awards Hellenic Olympic Committee (HOC) in a ceremony took place at the HOC headquarters premises in Athens, with the HOC Members Alexandra Palli and Giannis Kapos presenting the award to 2021 National Women/Men Karate Team, which was attended by the President of the Hellenic Republic Katerina Sakellaropoulou, the Ambassador of Japan to Greece Yasunori Nakayama and the Ambassador of People's Republic of China to Greece Xiao Junzheng.
- In 2021, she received scholarship for the 2020 Olympic Games preparation programme in Tokyo (which had originally been scheduled in 2020 but has been postponemened to 2021 due to the then pandemic) from the join participation of A. G. Leventis Foundation, John S. Latsis Foundation, and Hellenic Olympic Committee.
- Awarded Honorary Award on 29 December 2019 from Municipality of Pella in a ceremony took place in the central pedestrianised street in Giannitsa.
- Awarded on 12 October 2019 by Country Manager for Greece & Cyprus of Qatar Airways Theresa Cissell, in the presence of Minister of Tourism of Greece, Harry Theocharis and Deputy Minister of Culture and Sports, Lefteris Avgenakis, at the event A Night to Remember by Qatar Airways during the Navarino Challenge 2019 where Qatar Airways honored personalities of the sports industry took place in the Westin Resort Costa Navarino, Messinia.
- Awarded Honorary Award on 1 February 2019 from the Association of Physical Education Graduates of Pieria.
- Awarded on 12 January 2019 from the Panhellenic Physiotherapists' Association took place in the Great Hall of the Culture Centre of Katerini.
- Honored for the gold medal she won in the Karate World Championship of 2018, she was awarded the Hellenic Olympic Committee (HOC) Award 2019, along with her coach Maximos Chatziliadis, on 9 January 2019 at the Annual HOC Honorary Awards in a ceremony took place at the HOC headquarters premises in Athens, with the President of the Hellenic Olympic Committee Spyros Capralos and the HOC Member Nikos Iatrou presenting the award to Eleni Chatziliadou and Maximos Chatziliadis, which was attended by the President of the Hellenic Republic Prokopis Pavlopoulos and the President of the European Olympic Committees Janez Kocijančič.
- Awarded Honorary Award οn 1 December 2018 to acknowledge her worldwide achievements with the National Karate Team of Greece from the Municipality of Katerini and its Organization for Education, Culture, Sports and Caring (OPPAP) at its annual awards event The People of Our Home for Our Home 2018 in a ceremony took place in the Great Hall of the Culture Centre of Katerini.
- In 2018, she accepted in the Hellenic Olympic Committee's programme Adopt an Athlete on the Way to Tokyo 2020, through sponsors, for the funding for athletes during their preparation for the 2020 Olympic Games in Tokyo.

== Me Too ==
Eleni Chatziliadou has spoken to media about having been intimidated and threatened from a man, who was not a Hellenic Karate Federation (ELOK) official member, involving behind the scenes to the Hellenic Karate Federation. She stressed about the revelations of Olympic sailing athlete Sofia Bekatorou, followed the took off in Greece of the Me Too movement in 2020, encouraged in her decision to talk publicly, after ten years of awaiting time, with her own case of harassment and abuse.

== Politics ==
On 31 December 2022 it officially announced that Eleni Chatziliadou will be taken part as candidate for municipal councilor in the 2023 municipal elections on 8 October 2023 with the Dimos Protypo political party of which has leader and mayoral candidate for Municipality of Katerini Ioannis Ntoumos, but she was not elected.

== Personal life ==
Eleni Chatziliadou married the athlete boxer Alexandros Tsanikidis in 2022.
