= Meltem Hocaoğlu =

Turkish karateka (born 1992)

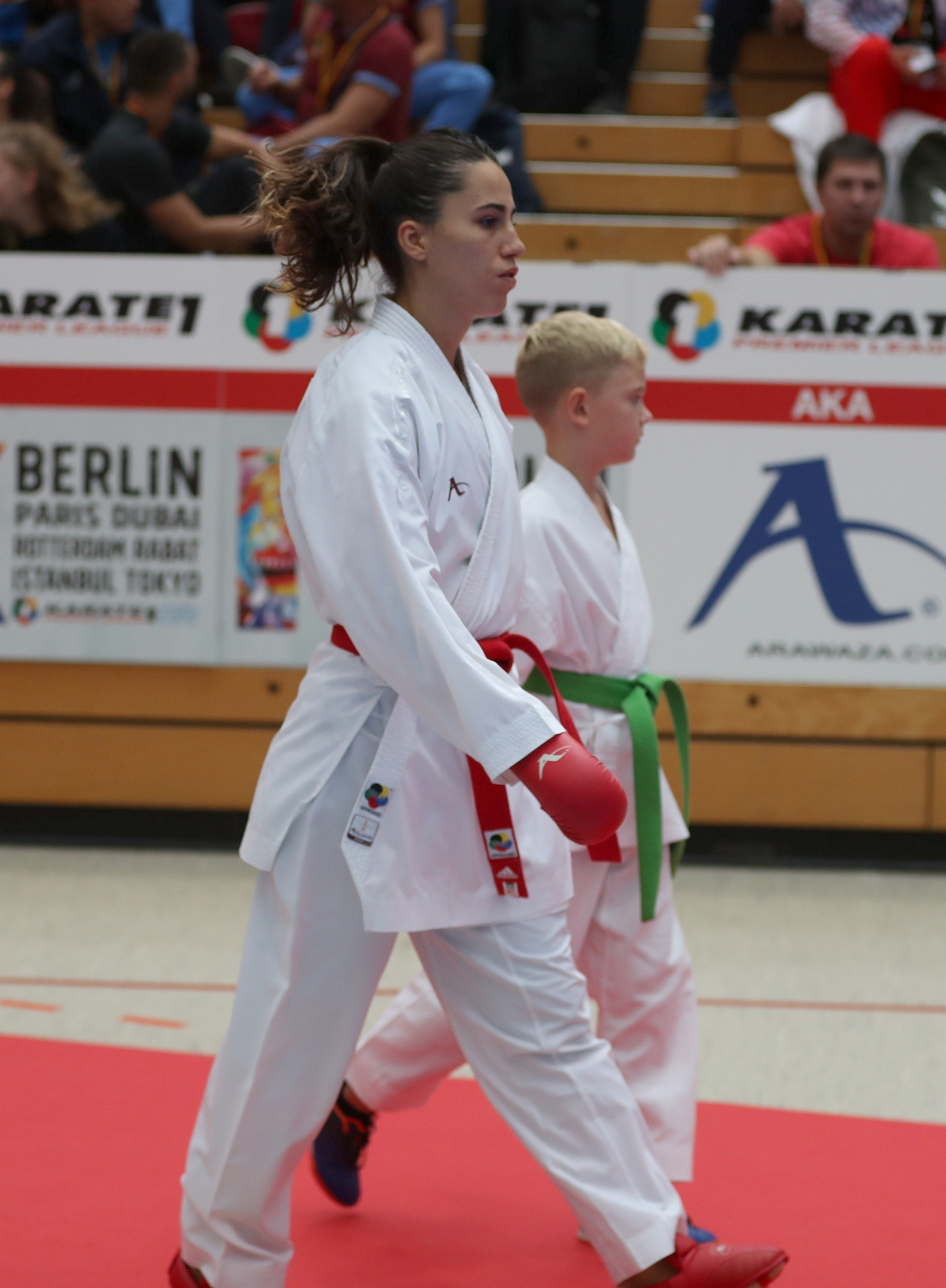
- Born: Meltem Hocaoğlu Akyol; 15 January 1992 (age 34); Istanbul, Turkey
- Other names: Meltem Hocaoğlu Akyol
- Nationality: Turkish
- Height: 176 cm (5 ft 9 in)
- Weight: 68 kg (150 lb; 10 st 10 lb)
- Division: +68 kg
- Style: Karate Kumite

Meltem Hocaoğlu Akyol (born 15 January 1992) is a Turkish karateka competing in the kumite +68 kg division. She is a multiple-time medalist at the World Karate Championships, European Karate Championships, European Games, Islamic Solidarity Games and Mediterranean Games.

== Career ==
At the 2013 Mediterranean Games held in Mersin, Turkey, Hocaoğlu won the gold medal in the women's kumite +68 kg event by defeating Shymaa Alsayed of Egypt 2–1 in the final.

She captured the silver medal in the women's kumite +68 kg event at the 2015 European Karate Championships in Istanbul, Turkey, and also won silver at the 2015 European Games in Baku, Azerbaijan.

At the 2021 European Karate Championships in Poreč, Croatia, Hocaoğlu claimed the gold medal in the +68 kg event after defeating Aleksandra Stubleva of Bulgaria 1–0 in the final.

She won a bronze medal in the +68 kg event at the 2022 Mediterranean Games in Oran, Algeria, defeating Aurora Zinovia Crivelli of Italy 5–4 in the bronze medal match. At the 2021 Islamic Solidarity Games held in Konya, Turkey, she took the silver medal in the +68 kg final, losing to Sofya Berultseva of Kazakhstan.
