= Fortesa Orana =

Kosovan karateka (born 1996)

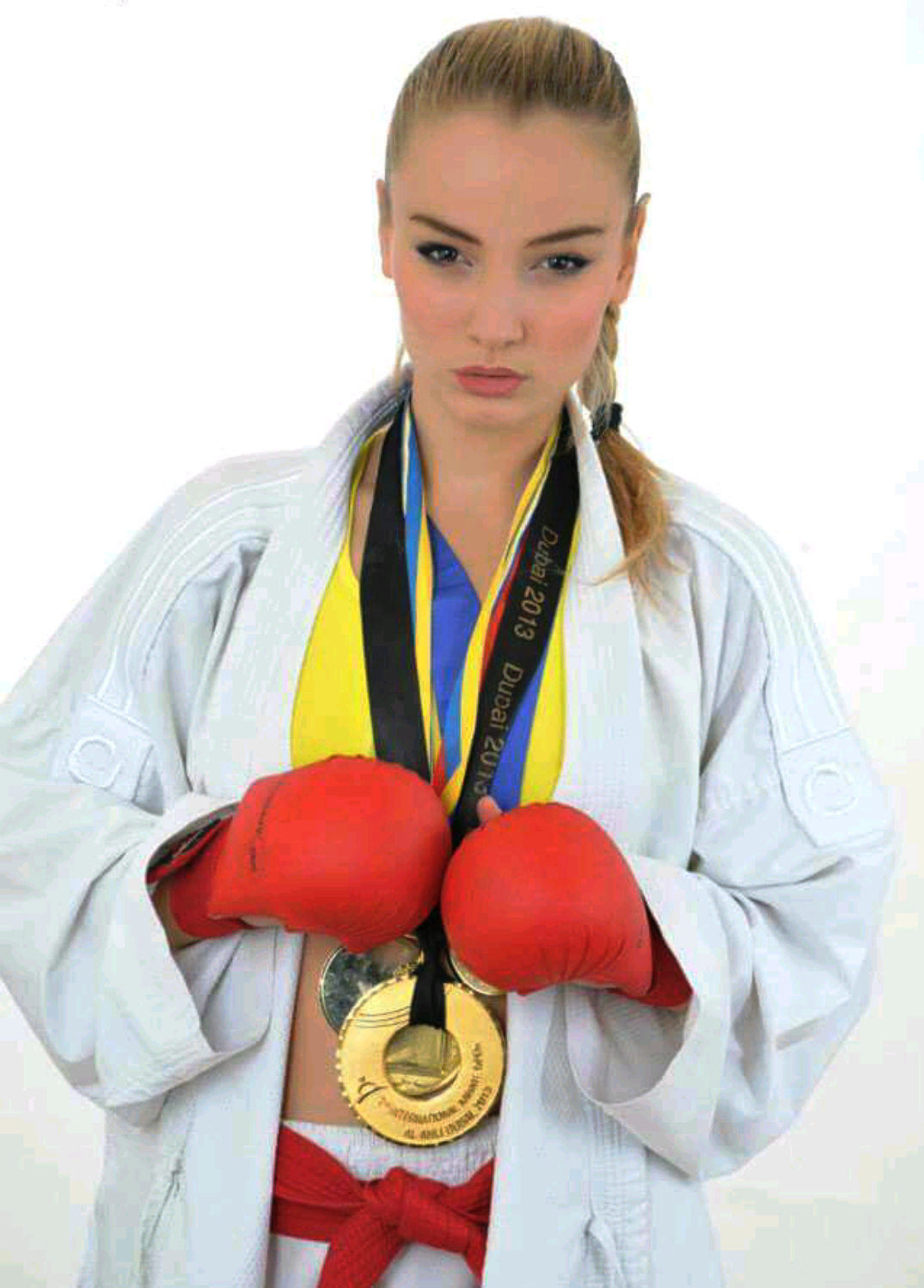
- Orana in 2016
- Born: 19 October 1996 (age 29); Gjilan, Kosovo
- Division: +58kg
- Style: Karate

Other information
- Website: www.fortesaorana.com

Fortesa Q. Orana (born 19 October 1996) is a Kosovan karateka who fights in the +58kg division. She won bronze at the Karate World Championships in 2023 and silver at the Mediterranean Karate Championships in 2024.

== Biography ==
Orana was born on 19 October 1996 in Gjilan, Kosovo, and is a member of the Elite Karate club in Gjilan. She entered her first karate tournament when she was aged 7. Orana has worked as a model and as a sports television presenter.

As a junior fighter, Orana fought in the -68kg division. As a junior, Orana won gold medals at the Ozawa Cup and a bronze medal in the Junior International Open.

After graduating to senior level, in 2017, Orana won silver at the "Grand Prix Croatia" Karate tournament. The following year, she won a gold medal at the Balkan Senior Championships in Istanbul, Turkey, defeating Serbian karateka Andriana VIkovac in the final fight. She competed at the 2018 Mediterranean Games in Tarragona, Spain, and was defeated in the first round by Greek karateka Eleni Chatziliadou.

In 2019, Orana came fifth at the 2019 European Karate Championships in Guadalajara, Spain, after being beaten 2–1 to by Finnish karateka Titta Keinanen. In preparation for the 2020 Summer Olympics in Tokyo, Japan, Orana was funded by the Kosovo Olympic Committee to train at an international training camp run by Azerbaijani coach Denys Morozov and held in Dubai, United Arab Emirates.

In 2021, Orana competed at the 2021 European Karate Championships in Poreč, Croatia, winning her group in the +68 kg category. In the group she beat Simona Simovska from North Macedonia, Nancy Garcia from France and Keinanen of Finland, who was then ranked eighth in the world rankings. She was beaten by Bulgarian karateka Aleksandra Stubleva in the semi-final fight for a place in the gold medal match, then fought in the bronze medal fight.

In 2022, Orana was the flag bearer for the 2022 Mediterranean Games in Oran, Algeria. She was defeated during the first round of the competition. Orana also came fifth at the Karate1 Premier League in Rabat, Morocco, but qualified for the final at the "Paris Open" Karate tournament.

In 2023, Orana won bronze at the Karate World Championships in Budapest, Hungary, alongside fellow Kosovan karatekas Vlera Qerimi and Hatixhe Zejnullahu. They were the first Kosovans to win medals at this event. For their win, the karatekas were honoured in Prishtina by Prime Minister of the Republic of Kosovo, Albin Kurti, and the Deputy Minister of Culture, Youth and Sports, Daulina Osmani. With Kosovan karatekas Vlera Qerimi and Elmedina Istogu, Orana also won gold at the European University Championship, also held in Hungary.

In September 2023, Orana won two gold medals in the +68 kilograms and Open Master 2023 categories at the "Basel Open" Karate tournament in Switzerland. She was named the best athlete of 2023 by the Municipality of Gjilan.

In 2024, Orana won silver at the Mediterranean Karate Championships in Olbia, Sardinia, Italy. At the 2024 European University Games, Orana represented for the University of Prishtina. She beat Sidra Buket Destegul of Turkey in the semi-final, before being beaten in the final match by Cypriot Theodosia Giamouki.

In April 2025, Orana won bronze at the Karate1 Premier League in Cairo, Egypt. Orana has also won bronze at the Balkan Championships.
