= María Torres García =

Spanish karateka (born 1997)

Personal information
- Born: 22 July 1997 (age 29) Málaga, Spain

Sport
- Country: Spain
- Sport: Karate
- Weight class: +68 kg
- Events: Kumite; Team kumite
Medal record
Women's karate
Representing Spain
World Championships
Gold medal – first place	2021 Dubai	Kumite +68 kg
Gold medal – first place	2023 Budapest	Team kumite
Silver medal – second place	2023 Budapest	Kumite +68 kg
Bronze medal – third place	2018 Madrid	Team kumite
World Games
Silver medal – second place	2022 Birmingham	Kumite +68 kg
Silver medal – second place	2025 Chengdu	Kumite +68 kg
European Games
Bronze medal – third place	2023 Kraków-Małopolska	Kumite +68 kg
European Championships
Bronze medal – third place	2022 Gaziantep	Team kumite
Bronze medal – third place	2025 Yerevan	Kumite +68 kg

María Torres García (Note: In this Spanish name, the first or paternal surname is Torres and the second or maternal family name is García.) (born 22 July 1997) is a Spanish karateka. She won the gold medal in the women's +68 kg event at the 2021 World Karate Championships held in Dubai, United Arab Emirates. She is also a two-time silver medalist in the women's +68 kg event at the World Games (2022 and 2025).

== Career ==
Torres won one of the bronze medals in the women's team kumite event at the 2018 World Karate Championships held in Madrid, Spain. In June 2021, she competed at the World Olympic Qualification Tournament held in Paris, France hoping to qualify for the 2020 Summer Olympics in Tokyo, Japan.

Torres won one of the bronze medals in the women's team kumite event at the 2022 European Karate Championships held in Gaziantep, Turkey. She also competed in the women's +68 kg event where she was eliminated in her third match. Torres lost her bronze medal match in the women's +68 kg event at the 2022 Mediterranean Games held in Oran, Algeria. Two weeks later, she won the silver medal in the women's +68 kg event at the 2022 World Games held in Birmingham, United States.

Torres competed in the women's +68 kg event at the 2023 European Karate Championships held in Guadalajara, Spain where she was eliminated in her first match. She won one of the bronze medals in the women's +68 kg event at the 2023 European Games held in Poland. Torres won the silver medal in the women's +68 kg event at the 2023 World Karate Championships held in Budapest, Hungary. She also won the gold medal in the women's team kumite event.

Torres lost her bronze medal match in the women's +68 kg event at the 2024 European Karate Championships held in Zadar, Croatia. A year later, she won a bronze medal in her event at the 2025 European Karate Championships held in Yerevan, Armenia. She won the silver medal in the women's +68 kg event at the 2025 World Games held in Chengdu, China.

== Achievements ==
Year	Competition	Venue	Rank	Event
2018	World Championships	Madrid, Spain	3rd	Team kumite
2021	World Championships	Dubai, United Arab Emirates	1st	Kumite +68 kg
2022	European Championships	Gaziantep, Turkey	3rd	Team kumite
2022	World Games	Birmingham, United States	2nd	Kumite +68 kg
2023	European Games	Kraków and Małopolska, Poland	3rd	Kumite +68 kg
2023	World Championships	Budapest, Hungary	2nd	Kumite +68 kg
2023	World Championships	Budapest, Hungary	1st	Team kumite
2025	European Championships	Yerevan, Armenia	3rd	Kumite +68 kg
2025	World Games	Chengdu, China	2nd	Kumite +68 kg
