= 2023 World Karate Championships =

Karate event in Budapest

2023 World Championships
- Venue: László Papp Budapest Sports Arena
- Location: Budapest, Hungary
- Dates: 24–29 October

The 2023 World Karate Championships was held from 24 to 29 October 2023 in Budapest, Hungary.

== Iranian team's visa problems ==
The visas of 21 Iranian karateka were not issued for various reasons. These karatekas were present in the men's kata and the women's committee.

== Medal table ==
* Host nation (Hungary)

Rank	Nation	Gold	Silver	Bronze	Total
1	Japan	4	1	1	6
2	Egypt	2	2	4	8
3	Turkey	2	2	1	5
4	France	2	0	3	5
5	Spain	1	2	3	6
6	Kazakhstan	1	1	1	3
7	Jordan	1	0	1	2
8	Azerbaijan	1	0	0	1
8	China	1	0	0	1
8	Greece	1	0	0	1
11	Italy	0	2	5	7
12	Iran	0	1	1	2
13	Bulgaria	0	1	0	1
13	Hong Kong	0	1	0	1
13	Hungary*	0	1	0	1
13	Montenegro	0	1	0	1
13	Switzerland	0	1	0	1
18	Ukraine	0	0	3	3
19	Venezuela	0	0	2	2
20	Croatia	0	0	1	1
20	Indonesia	0	0	1	1
20	Kosovo	0	0	1	1
20	Saudi Arabia	0	0	1	1
20	Serbia	0	0	1	1
20	United States	0	0	1	1
–	Individual Neutral Athletes (Note: 12 Russian and 5 Belarusian karatekas participated as Individual Neutral Athletes as a result of sanctions imposed following the 2022 invasion of Ukraine. The World Karate Federation does not include the medals won by these karatekas in the official medal table.)	0	0	1	1
Totals (25 entries)		16	16	32	64

== Medalists ==
=== Men ===
Event	Gold	Silver	Bronze
Individual kata	Ali Sofuoğlu; Turkey	Damián Quintero; Spain	Ariel Torres; United States
Individual kata	Ali Sofuoğlu; Turkey	Damián Quintero; Spain	Kakeru Nishiyama; Japan
Team kata	Japan; Koji Arimoto; Kazumasa Moto; Ryuji Moto	Turkey; Emre Vefa Göktaş; Enes Özdemir; Ali Sofuoğlu	Spain; Salvador Balbuena; Sergio Galán; Rubén García; Raúl Martín
Team kata	Japan; Koji Arimoto; Kazumasa Moto; Ryuji Moto	Turkey; Emre Vefa Göktaş; Enes Özdemir; Ali Sofuoğlu	Italy; Gianluca Gallo; Alessio Ghinami; Alessandro Iodice
Kumite −60 kg	Christos-Stefanos Xenos; Greece	Kaisar Alpysbay; Kazakhstan	Angelo Crescenzo; Italy
Kumite −60 kg	Christos-Stefanos Xenos; Greece	Kaisar Alpysbay; Kazakhstan	Eray Şamdan; Turkey
Kumite −67 kg	Steven Da Costa; France	Nenad Dulović; Montenegro	Didar Amirali; Kazakhstan
Kumite −67 kg	Steven Da Costa; France	Nenad Dulović; Montenegro	Fahad Al-Khathami; Saudi Arabia
Kumite −75 kg	Abdalla Abdelaziz; Egypt	Gábor Hárspataki; Hungary	Ernest Sharafutdinov; Individual Neutral Athletes
Kumite −75 kg	Abdalla Abdelaziz; Egypt	Gábor Hárspataki; Hungary	Andrii Zaplitnyi; Ukraine
Kumite −84 kg	Youssef Badawy; Egypt	Mehdi Khodabakhshi; Iran	Valerii Chobotar; Ukraine
Kumite −84 kg	Youssef Badawy; Egypt	Mehdi Khodabakhshi; Iran	Mohammad Al-Jafari; Jordan
Kumite +84 kg	Mehdi Filali; France	Taha Mahmoud; Egypt	Đorđe Tešanović; Serbia
Kumite +84 kg	Mehdi Filali; France	Taha Mahmoud; Egypt	Sajjad Ganjzadeh; Iran
Team kumite	Jordan; Zaki Abu Qaoud; Mohammad Al-Jafari; Afeef Ghaith; Abdallah Hammad; Hasan Masarweh; Yousef Nofal; Ahmad Shadid	Egypt; Abdalla Abdelaziz; Abdalla Hesham Abdelgawad; Youssef Badawy; Ahmed El-Masry; Ali El-Sawy; Taha Tarek Mahmoud; Omar Ashraf Mohamed	France; Enzo Berthon; Kilian Cizo; Jessie Da Costa; Steven Da Costa; Mehdi Filali; Thanh-Liêm Lê; Younesse Salmi
Team kumite	Jordan; Zaki Abu Qaoud; Mohammad Al-Jafari; Afeef Ghaith; Abdallah Hammad; Hasan Masarweh; Yousef Nofal; Ahmad Shadid	Egypt; Abdalla Abdelaziz; Abdalla Hesham Abdelgawad; Youssef Badawy; Ahmed El-Masry; Ali El-Sawy; Taha Tarek Mahmoud; Omar Ashraf Mohamed	Italy; Matteo Avanzini; Matteo Fiore; Luca Maresca; Simone Marino; Michele Martina; Andre Minardi; Lorenzo Pietromarchi

=== Women ===
Event	Gold	Silver	Bronze
Individual kata	Hikaru Ono; Japan	Grace Lau; Hong Kong	Paola García; Spain
Individual kata	Hikaru Ono; Japan	Grace Lau; Hong Kong	Terryana D'Onofrio; Italy
Team kata	Japan; Saori Ishibashi; Chiho Mizukami; Sae Taira	Italy; Terryana D'Onofrio; Michela Rizzo; Elena Roversi	Spain; Paola García; María López; Gema Morales; Raquel Roy
Team kata	Japan; Saori Ishibashi; Chiho Mizukami; Sae Taira	Italy; Terryana D'Onofrio; Michela Rizzo; Elena Roversi	Egypt; Asmaa Allam; Noha Amr Antar; Aya Hesham
Kumite −50 kg	Moldir Zhangbyrbay; Kazakhstan	Erminia Perfetto; Italy	Reem Ahmed Salama; Egypt
Kumite −50 kg	Moldir Zhangbyrbay; Kazakhstan	Erminia Perfetto; Italy	Yorgelis Salazar; Venezuela
Kumite −55 kg	Tuba Yakan; Turkey	Ivet Goranova; Bulgaria	Bárbara Pérez; Venezuela
Kumite −55 kg	Tuba Yakan; Turkey	Ivet Goranova; Bulgaria	Anzhelika Terliuga; Ukraine
Kumite −61 kg	Gong Li; China	Fatma Naz Yenen; Turkey	Laura Sivert; France
Kumite −61 kg	Gong Li; China	Fatma Naz Yenen; Turkey	Noursin Aly; Egypt
Kumite −68 kg	Irina Zaretska; Azerbaijan	Elena Quirici; Switzerland	Alizée Agier; France
Kumite −68 kg	Irina Zaretska; Azerbaijan	Elena Quirici; Switzerland	Ceyco Georgia Zefanya; Indonesia
Kumite +68 kg	Ayaka Saito; Japan	María Torres; Spain	Menna Shaaban Okila; Egypt
Kumite +68 kg	Ayaka Saito; Japan	María Torres; Spain	Clio Ferracuti; Italy
Team kumite	Spain; Carlota Fernández; Adriana Gil; María Nieto; María Torres	Japan; Tsubasa Kama; Ayaka Saito; Yuzuki Sawae; Sarara Shimada	Kosovo; Albulena Gervalla; Fortesa Orana; Vlera Qerimi; Hatigje Zejnullahu
Team kumite	Spain; Carlota Fernández; Adriana Gil; María Nieto; María Torres	Japan; Tsubasa Kama; Ayaka Saito; Yuzuki Sawae; Sarara Shimada	Croatia; Sadea Bečirević; Nikolina Golomboš; Lucija Lesjak; Lea Vukoja

== Para Karate ==
=== Medal table ===
* Host nation (Egypt)

Rank	Nation	Gold	Silver	Bronze	Total
Totals (0 entries)		0	0	0	0
