= 2024 European Karate Championships – Women's 50 kg =

European Karate Championship

Women's 50 kg at the 2024 European Karate Championships
- Venue: Krešimir Ćosić Hall
- Location: Zadar, Croatia
- Dates: 10–11 May
- Nations: 31
- Teams: 31

Medalists
gold medal	Ema Sgardelli	Croatia
silver medal	Mihaela Mishovska	North Macedonia
bronze medal	Selva Küçükoğlu	Turkey
bronze medal	Erminia Perfetto	Italy

The women's 50 kg competition at the 2024 European Karate Championships was held from 10 to 11 May 2024.

== Results ==
=== Final ===
Final
Mihaela Mishovska (MKD)	0
Ema Sgardelli (CRO)	8

=== Top half ===
Round of 32
Niamh Cosgrove (ENG)	4
Redona Gashi (KOS)	2
Bettina Plank (AUT)	0
Styliani Tzilia (GRE)	2
Réka Molnár (HUN)	3
Irene Kontou (CYP)	1
Zuzanna Bernaciak (POL)	1
Natália Vargová (SVK)	2
Tamara Grčić (SRB)	3
Coral Amos (ISR)	6
Lea Huber (SUI)	4
Andreea Cucu (ROU)	7
Mariami Vasadze (GEO)	7
Ulyana Markova (ANA)	6
Mihaela Mishovska (MKD)	7
Erminia Perfetto (ITA)	7

Round of 16
Niamh Cosgrove (ENG)	0
Styliani Tzilia (GRE)	3
Irene Kontou (CYP)	7
Natália Vargová (SVK)	4
Coral Amos (ISR)	1
Andreea Cucu (ROU)	1
Mariami Vasadze (GEO)	4
Mihaela Mishovska (MKD)	5

Quarterfinals
Styliani Tzilia (GRE)	0
Irene Kontou (CYP)	0
Coral Amos (ISR)	2
Mihaela Mishovska (MKD)	2

Semifinals
Styliani Tzilia (GRE)	1
Mihaela Mishovska (MKD)	4

=== Bottom half ===
Round of 32
Teodora Tsaneva (BUL)	4
Catarina Rodrigues (POR)	1
Anja Jović (MNE)	7
Lara Đaković (SLO)	0
Yuliia Palashevska (UKR)	2
Samina Yalçın (NED)	0
Sara Hodžić (BIH)	0
Nadia Gómez (ESP)	3
Tiphaine Bonnarde (FRA)	2
Shara Hubrich (GER)	0
Fidan Teymurova (AZE)	3
Tírna Connors (IRL)	1
Aleksandra Mihailova (LAT)	4
Selva Küçükoğlu (TUR)	5

Round of 16
Teodora Tsaneva (BUL)	5
Anja Jović (MNE)	6
Yuliia Palashevska (UKR)	4
Nadia Gómez (ESP)	1
Tiphaine Bonnarde (FRA)	2
Fidan Teymurova (AZE)	2
Selva Küçükoğlu (TUR)	2
Ema Sgardelli (CRO)	7

Quarterfinals
Anja Jović (MNE)	1
Yuliia Palashevska (UKR)	2
Tiphaine Bonnarde (FRA)	1
Ema Sgardelli (CRO)	2

Semifinals
Yuliia Palashevska (UKR)	1
Ema Sgardelli (CRO)	4

=== Repechage ===
Repechage round 1
Mariami Vasadze (GEO)	0
Erminia Perfetto (ITA)	8

Repechage round 2
Coral Amos (ISR)	2
Erminia Perfetto (ITA)	7
Tiphaine Bonnarde (FRA)	9
Selva Küçükoğlu (TUR)	10

Bronze medals
Styliani Tzilia (GRE)	0
Erminia Perfetto (ITA)	2
Yuliia Palashevska (UKR)	2
Selva Küçükoğlu (TUR)	7
