= Algeria at the 2025 World Games =

- IOC code: ALG
- NOC: Algerian Olympic Committee

in Chengdu, China 7 August 2025 – 17 August 2025
- Competitors: 3 (1 man and 2 women) in 3 sports and 3 events

World Games appearances
- 1981; 1985; 1989; 1993; 1997; 2001; 2005; 2009; 2013; 2017; 2022; 2025

Algeria will compete at the 2025 World Games held in Chengdu, China from 7 to 17 August 2025.

== Competitors ==
The following is the list of number of competitors in the Games.

Sport	Men	Women	Total
Karate	0	1	1
Kickboxing	0	1	1
Triathlon	1	0	1
Total	1	2	3

== Karate ==
Athlete	Event	Group stage				Semifinals	Final / BM	
Athlete	Event	Opposition Result	Opposition Result	Opposition Result	Rank	Opposition Result	Opposition Result	Rank
Cylia Ouikene	Women's kumite 50 kg	Zhangbyrbay (KAZ); L 0–4	Wang (CHN); W 2–0	Salazar (COL); W 3–1	2	Bahmanyar (IRI); L 3–4	Sgardelli (CRO); L 3–6	4

== Kickboxing ==
Athlete	Event	Quarterfinal	Semifinal	Final / BM	
Athlete	Event	Opposition Result	Opposition Result	Opposition Result	Rank
'Belkise Mechraoui	Women's K1 Style –60 kg	Bickel (NED); L 0–3	Did not advance		
