= Miho Miyahara =

Japanese karateka (born 1996)

Personal information
- Born: 3 September 1996 (age 29) Sawara-ku, Fukuoka City, Kyushu Island

Sport
- Country: Japan
- Sport: Karate
- Weight class: 50 kg; 55 kg (Olympic Games)
- Event: Kumite
Medal record
Women's karate
Representing Japan
Event	1st	2nd	3rd
World Games	0	1	1
World Championships	2	1	0
Asian Games	0	0	1
Asian Championships	1	2	0
Total	3	4	2
World Games
Silver medal – second place	2017 Wrocław	Kumite 50 kg
Bronze medal – third place	2022 Birmingham	Kumite 50 kg
World Championships
Gold medal – first place	2018 Madrid	Kumite 50 kg
Gold medal – first place	2021 Dubai	Kumite 50 kg
Silver medal – second place	2016 Linz	Kumite 50 kg
Asian Games
Bronze medal – third place	2018 Jakarta	Kumite 50 kg
Asian Championships
Gold medal – first place	2018 Amman	Kumite 50 kg
Silver medal – second place	2019 Tashkent	Kumite 50 kg
Silver medal – second place	2022 Tashkent	Kumite 50 kg

Miho Miyahara (宮原 美穂, Miyahara Miho, born 3 September 1996) is a Japanese karateka. She is a two-time gold medalist in the women's kumite 50 kg event at the World Karate Championships (2018 and 2021). She also won the gold medal in this event at the 2018 Asian Karate Championships.

Miyahara represented Japan at the 2020 Summer Olympics in Tokyo, Japan in karate. She competed in the women's 55 kg event.

== Career ==
Miyahara won the silver medal in the women's 50 kg event at the 2016 World Karate Championships held in Linz, Austria. In the final, she lost against Alexandra Recchia of France. In 2017, Miyahara repeated this result with the silver medal in the women's kumite 50 kg event at the World Games in Wrocław, Poland. The gold medal also went to Alexandra Recchia.

At the 2018 Asian Karate Championships held in Amman, Jordan, Miyahara won the gold medal in the women's kumite 50 kg event. A few days later, she won the gold medal in the women's kumite 50 kg event at the 2018 World University Karate Championships held in Kobe, Japan. A month later, she won one of the bronze medals in the women's kumite 50 kg event at the 2018 Asian Games held in Jakarta, Indonesia.

At the 2019 Asian Karate Championships held in Tashkent, Uzbekistan, Miyahara won the silver medal in the women's kumite 50 kg event. In the final, she lost against Bakhriniso Babaeva of Uzbekistan.

In August 2021, at the 2020 Summer Olympics in Tokyo, Japan, Miyahara competed in the women's 55 kg event. In November 2021, she won the gold medal in the women's 50 kg event at the World Karate Championships held in Dubai, United Arab Emirates. She defeated Shara Hubrich of Germany in her gold medal match.

Miyahara won the bronze medal in the women's 50 kg event at the 2022 World Games held in Birmingham, United States. She defeated Gu Shiau-shuang of Chinese Taipei in her bronze medal match. In 2023, she lost her bronze medal match in the women's 50 kg event at the 2022 Asian Games held in Hangzhou, China.

== Achievements ==
Year	Competition	Venue	Rank	Event
2016	World Championships	Linz, Austria	2nd	Kumite 50 kg
2017	World Games	Wrocław, Poland	2nd	Kumite 50 kg
2018	Asian Championships	Amman, Jordan	1st	Kumite 50 kg
2018	Asian Games	Jakarta, Indonesia	3rd	Kumite 50 kg
2018	World Championships	Madrid, Spain	1st	Kumite 50 kg
2019	Asian Championships	Tashkent, Uzbekistan	2nd	Kumite 50 kg
2021	World Championships	Dubai, United Arab Emirates	1st	Kumite 50 kg
2022	World Games	Birmingham, United States	3rd	Kumite 50 kg
2022	Asian Championships	Tashkent, Uzbekistan	2nd	Kumite 50 kg
