= 2021 World Karate Championships – Women's 50 kg =

World Karate Championship

Women's kumite 50 kg at the 2021 World Karate Championships
- Venue: Hamdan Sports Complex
- Location: Dubai, United Arab Emirates
- Dates: 17–20 November
- Competitors: 52 from 52 nations

Medalists
gold medal	Miho Miyahara	Japan
silver medal	Shara Hubrich	Germany
bronze medal	Kateryna Kryva	Ukraine
bronze medal	Yasmin Nasr Elgewily	Egypt

The Women's 50 kg competition at the 2021 World Karate Championships was held from 17 to 20 November 2021.

== Results ==
=== Finals ===
Semifinals
(Germany) Shara Hubrich	2
(Kazakhstan) Moldir Zhangbyrbay	1
(Morocco) Chaimae El Hayti	3
(Japan) Miho Miyahara	8

Final
(Germany) Shara Hubrich	0
(Japan) Miho Miyahara	0

=== Repechage ===
Repechage 1
(Scotland) Amy Luke	1
(Ukraine) Kateryna Kryva	4

Repechage 2
(Ukraine) Kateryna Kryva	4
(Austria) Bettina Plank	3

Repechage 3
(Ukraine) Kateryna Kryva	2
(Algeria) Cylia Ouikene	1

Bronze medal
(Ukraine) Kateryna Kryva	5
(Kazakhstan) Moldir Zhangbyrbay	3

Repechage 2
(Australia) Maria Alexiadis	0
(Egypt) Yasmin Nasr Elgewily	5

Repechage 3
(Egypt) Yasmin Nasr Elgewily	1
(Hong Kong) Tsang Yee Ting	1

Bronze medal
(Egypt) Yasmin Nasr Elgewily	2
(Morocco) Chaimae El Hayti	2

=== Top half ===
==== Section 1 ====
First round
(North Macedonia) Sara Radicevska	0
(Philippines) Junna Tsukii	0
(Uzbekistan) Bakhriniso Babaeva	2
(England) Lauren Crawford	0
(Algeria) Cylia Ouikene	4
(Mexico) Jesús Terrazas	0
(Scotland) Amy Luke	0
(Germany) Shara Hubrich	5
(Azerbaijan) Nurana Aliyeva	4
(Slovakia) Lucia Kováčiková	0

Second round
(Philippines) Junna Tsukii	2
(Uzbekistan) Bakhriniso Babaeva	3
(Algeria) Cylia Ouikene	4
(United States) Tyler Hudson	0
(Germany) Shara Hubrich	1
(Ukraine) Kateryna Kryva	1
(Azerbaijan) Nurana Aliyeva	2
(Austria) Bettina Plank	4

Third round
(Uzbekistan) Bakhriniso Babaeva	0
(Algeria) Cylia Ouikene	1
(Germany) Shara Hubrich	1
(Austria) Bettina Plank	0

Quarterfinals
(Algeria) Cylia Ouikene	0
(Germany) Shara Hubrich	4

==== Section 2 ====
First round
(Ecuador) Lili Alvarado	1
(France) Niswa Ahmed	3
(Venezuela) Yorgelis Salazar	5
(Kazakhstan) Moldir Zhangbyrbay	5
(Cyprus) Elina Papageorgiou	1
(Canada) Jusleen Virk	3
Elizaveta Grigoreva	8
(Kosovo) Hatigje Zejnullahu	0
(Brazil) Paula Freire	1
(Belgium) Elisa Schenk	0

Second round
(France) Niswa Ahmed	1
(Kazakhstan) Moldir Zhangbyrbay	1
(Canada) Jusleen Virk	0
(Chinese Taipei) Gu Shiau-shuang	4
Elizaveta Grigoreva	7
(Romania) Denisa Stanciu	0
(Brazil) Paula Freire	0
(Turkey) Serap Özçelik	2

Third round
(Kazakhstan) Moldir Zhangbyrbay	8
(Chinese Taipei) Gu Shiau-shuang	1
Elizaveta Grigoreva	0
(Turkey) Serap Özçelik	5

Quarterfinals
(Kazakhstan) Moldir Zhangbyrbay	4
(Turkey) Serap Özçelik	3

=== Bottom half ===
==== Section 3 ====
First round
(Italy) Erminia Perfetto	8
(Poland) Maria Depta	0
(Croatia) Jelena Pehar	0
(Slovenia) Urša Haberl	10
(El Salvador) Gabriela Izaguirre	10
(South Korea) Jung Ji-young	2
(Spain) Nadia Gómez	2
(Morocco) Chaimae El Hayti	3
(Switzerland) Nur Kars	2
(Bosnia and Herzegovina) Iris Ćorić	2

Second round
(Italy) Erminia Perfetto	6
(Slovenia) Urša Haberl	1
(El Salvador) Gabriela Izaguirre	4
(Kenya) Catherine Mbithe	0
(Morocco) Chaimae El Hayti	1
(Montenegro) Anja Jović	0
(Bosnia and Herzegovina) Iris Ćorić	0
(Serbia) Jelena Milivojčević	0

Third round
(Italy) Erminia Perfetto	7
(El Salvador) Gabriela Izaguirre	1
(Morocco) Chaimae El Hayti	6
(Serbia) Jelena Milivojčević	5

Quarterfinals
(Italy) Erminia Perfetto	0
(Morocco) Chaimae El Hayti	3

==== Section 4 ====
First round
(Latvia) Aleksandra Mihailova	4
(Colombia) Daniela Gallego	4
(India) Amritpal Kaur	0
(Hungary) Réka Molnár	3
(United Arab Emirates) Hawraa Al-Ajmi	0
(Hong Kong) Tsang Yee Ting	6
Tippawan Khamsi	3
(Israel) Coral Amos	0
(Chile) ️Fernanda Vega	0
(Australia) Maria Alexiadis	0

Second round
(Colombia) Daniela Gallego	0
(Hungary) Réka Molnár	3
(Hong Kong) Tsang Yee Ting	0
(Bulgaria) Kristina Svilenova	0
Tippawan Khamsi	0
(Egypt) Yasmin Nasr Elgewily	5
(Australia) Maria Alexiadis	1
(Japan) Miho Miyahara	4

Third round
(Hungary) Réka Molnár	0
(Hong Kong) Tsang Yee Ting	4
(Egypt) Yasmin Nasr Elgewily	1
(Japan) Miho Miyahara	3

Quarterfinals
(Hong Kong) Tsang Yee Ting	1
(Japan) Miho Miyahara	4
