= Karate at the 2022 Asian Games =

Karate competition

- Venue: Linping Sports Centre Gymnasium
- Dates: 5–8 October 2023
- Competitors: 205 from 35 nations

Karate at the 2022 Asian Games was held at Linping Sports Centre Gymnasium in Hangzhou, China, from 5 October to 8 October 2023.

== Schedule ==
| P | Preliminary rounds & Repechage | F | Finals |

| Event↓/Date → | 5th Thu | | 6th Fri | | 7th Sat | | 8th Sun | |
|---|---|---|---|---|---|---|---|---|
| Men's kata | P | F | | | | | | |
| Men's team kata | | | | | | | P | F |
| Men's kumite 60 kg | | | P | F | | | | |
| Men's kumite 67 kg | | | | | P | F | | |
| Men's kumite 75 kg | P | F | | | | | | |
| Men's kumite 84 kg | | | | | P | F | | |
| Men's kumite +84 kg | | | P | F | | | | |
| Women's kata | P | F | | | | | | |
| Women's team kata | | | P | F | | | | |
| Women's kumite 50 kg | | | | | | | P | F |
| Women's kumite 55 kg | | | | | P | F | | |
| Women's kumite 61 kg | | | P | F | | | | |
| Women's kumite 68 kg | P | F | | | | | | |
| Women's kumite +68 kg | | | | | P | F | | |

== Medalists ==
=== Men ===
| Event | Gold | Silver | Bronze |
|---|---|---|---|
| Kata | Kazumasa Moto; Japan | Kuok Kin Hang; Macau | Park Hee-jun; South Korea |
| Kata | Kazumasa Moto; Japan | Kuok Kin Hang; Macau | Salman Al-Mosawi; Kuwait |
| Team kata | Japan; Koji Arimoto; Kazumasa Moto; Ryuji Moto | Macau; Cheang Pei Lok; Fong Man Hou; Kuok Kin Hang | Iraq; Pazhar Mahdi; Binar Mustafa; Yousif Salam |
| Team kata | Japan; Koji Arimoto; Kazumasa Moto; Ryuji Moto | Macau; Cheang Pei Lok; Fong Man Hou; Kuok Kin Hang | Kuwait; Mohammad Al-Mosawi; Salman Al-Mosawi; Mohammad Bader |
| Kumite −60 kg | Kaisar Alpysbay; Kazakhstan | Abdullah Shaaban; Kuwait | Abdullah Hammad; Jordan |
| Kumite −60 kg | Kaisar Alpysbay; Kazakhstan | Abdullah Shaaban; Kuwait | Siwakon Muekthong; Thailand |
| Kumite −67 kg | Fahed Al-Ajmi; Kuwait | Abdelrahman Al-Masatfa; Jordan | Baýry Baýryýew; Turkmenistan |
| Kumite −67 kg | Fahed Al-Ajmi; Kuwait | Abdelrahman Al-Masatfa; Jordan | Didar Amirali; Kazakhstan |
| Kumite −75 kg | Nurkanat Azhikanov; Kazakhstan | Hasan Masarweh; Jordan | Nazim Nurlanov; Kyrgyzstan |
| Kumite −75 kg | Nurkanat Azhikanov; Kazakhstan | Hasan Masarweh; Jordan | Ignatius Joshua Kandou; Indonesia |
| Kumite −84 kg | Arif Afifuddin; Malaysia | Daniyar Yuldashev; Kazakhstan | Đỗ Thành Nhân; Vietnam |
| Kumite −84 kg | Arif Afifuddin; Malaysia | Daniyar Yuldashev; Kazakhstan | Mohammad Al-Jafari; Jordan |
| Kumite +84 kg | Sajjad Ganjzadeh; Iran | Adilet Shadykanov; Kyrgyzstan | Tareg Hamedi; Saudi Arabia |
| Kumite +84 kg | Sajjad Ganjzadeh; Iran | Adilet Shadykanov; Kyrgyzstan | Teerawat Kangtong; Thailand |

=== Women ===
| Event | Gold | Silver | Bronze |
|---|---|---|---|
| Kata | Kiyou Shimizu; Japan | Lovelly Anne Robberth; Malaysia | Sakura Alforte; Philippines |
| Kata | Kiyou Shimizu; Japan | Lovelly Anne Robberth; Malaysia | Grace Lau; Hong Kong |
| Team kata | Vietnam; Lưu Thị Thu Uyên; Nguyễn Ngọc Trâm; Nguyễn Thị Phương | Malaysia; Naccy Nelly Evvaferra; Lovelly Anne Robberth; Niathalia Sherawinnie | Brunei; Rodhyatul Adhwanna; Farhana Najeeha; Farhah Syahirah |
| Team kata | Vietnam; Lưu Thị Thu Uyên; Nguyễn Ngọc Trâm; Nguyễn Thị Phương | Malaysia; Naccy Nelly Evvaferra; Lovelly Anne Robberth; Niathalia Sherawinnie | Cambodia; Oun Sreyda; Puthea Sreynuch; That Chhenghorng |
| Kumite −50 kg | Gu Shiau-shuang; Chinese Taipei | Moldir Zhangbyrbay; Kazakhstan | Hawraa Al-Ajmi; United Arab Emirates |
| Kumite −50 kg | Gu Shiau-shuang; Chinese Taipei | Moldir Zhangbyrbay; Kazakhstan | Sara Bahmanyar; Iran |
| Kumite −55 kg | Sevinch Rakhimova; Uzbekistan | Ku Tsui-ping; Chinese Taipei | Fatemeh Saadati; Iran |
| Kumite −55 kg | Sevinch Rakhimova; Uzbekistan | Ku Tsui-ping; Chinese Taipei | Ding Jiamei; China |
| Kumite −61 kg | Gong Li; China | Nguyễn Thị Ngoan; Vietnam | Assel Kanay; Kazakhstan |
| Kumite −61 kg | Gong Li; China | Nguyễn Thị Ngoan; Vietnam | Kymbat Toitonova; Kyrgyzstan |
| Kumite −68 kg | Li Qiaoqiao; China | Laura Alikul; Kazakhstan | Đinh Thị Hương; Vietnam |
| Kumite −68 kg | Li Qiaoqiao; China | Laura Alikul; Kazakhstan | Hala Al-Qadi; Palestine |
| Kumite +68 kg | Sofya Berultseva; Kazakhstan | Arika Gurung; Nepal | Joud Al-Drous; Jordan |
| Kumite +68 kg | Sofya Berultseva; Kazakhstan | Arika Gurung; Nepal | Yuzuki Sawae; Japan |

== Medal table ==
| Rank | Nation | Gold | Silver | Bronze | Total |
|---|---|---|---|---|---|
| 1 | Kazakhstan (KAZ) | 3 | 3 | 2 | 8 |
| 2 | Japan (JPN) | 3 | 0 | 1 | 4 |
| 3 | China (CHN) | 2 | 0 | 1 | 3 |
| 4 | Malaysia (MAS) | 1 | 2 | 0 | 3 |
| 5 | Kuwait (KUW) | 1 | 1 | 2 | 4 |
| 5 | Vietnam (VIE) | 1 | 1 | 2 | 4 |
| 7 | Chinese Taipei (TPE) | 1 | 1 | 0 | 2 |
| 8 | Iran (IRI) | 1 | 0 | 2 | 3 |
| 9 | Uzbekistan (UZB) | 1 | 0 | 0 | 1 |
| 10 | Jordan (JOR) | 0 | 2 | 3 | 5 |
| 11 | Macau (MAC) | 0 | 2 | 0 | 2 |
| 12 | Kyrgyzstan (KGZ) | 0 | 1 | 2 | 3 |
| 13 | Nepal (NEP) | 0 | 1 | 0 | 1 |
| 14 | Thailand (THA) | 0 | 0 | 2 | 2 |
| 15 | Brunei (BRU) | 0 | 0 | 1 | 1 |
| 15 | Cambodia (CAM) | 0 | 0 | 1 | 1 |
| 15 | Hong Kong (HKG) | 0 | 0 | 1 | 1 |
| 15 | Indonesia (INA) | 0 | 0 | 1 | 1 |
| 15 | Iraq (IRQ) | 0 | 0 | 1 | 1 |
| 15 | Palestine (PLE) | 0 | 0 | 1 | 1 |
| 15 | Philippines (PHI) | 0 | 0 | 1 | 1 |
| 15 | Saudi Arabia (KSA) | 0 | 0 | 1 | 1 |
| 15 | South Korea (KOR) | 0 | 0 | 1 | 1 |
| 15 | Turkmenistan (TKM) | 0 | 0 | 1 | 1 |
| 15 | United Arab Emirates (UAE) | 0 | 0 | 1 | 1 |
| Totals (25 entries) | | 14 | 14 | 28 | 56 |

== Participating nations ==
A total of 205 athletes from 35 nations competed in karate at the 2022 Asian Games:

- Afghanistan (2)
- Bangladesh (5)
- Bhutan (2)
- Brunei (4)
- Cambodia (10)
- China (4)
- Chinese Taipei (8)
- Hong Kong (9)
- Indonesia (8)
- Iran (8)
- Iraq (3)
- Japan (10)
- Jordan (8)
- Kazakhstan (8)
- Kuwait (7)
- Kyrgyzstan (7)
- Laos (2)
- Macau (10)
- Malaysia (10)
- Nepal (8)
- North Korea (1)
- Pakistan (4)
- Palestine (2)
- Philippines (7)
- Qatar (3)
- Saudi Arabia (5)
- South Korea (7)
- Sri Lanka (2)
- Tajikistan (3)
- Thailand (8)
- Timor-Leste (3)
- Turkmenistan (4)
- United Arab Emirates (3)
- Uzbekistan (8)
- Vietnam (12)
