= 2026 European Karate Championships – Women's 50 kg =

Women's 50 kg at the 2026 European Karate Championships
- Venue: Eissporthalle Frankfurt
- Location: Frankfurt, Germany
- Dates: 21, 23 May
- Competitors: 33 from 33 nations

Medalists
gold medal	Ema Sgardelli	Croatia
silver medal	Teodora Tsaneva	Bulgaria
bronze medal	Erminia Perfetto	Italy
bronze medal	Patricia Nastas	Romania

The women's 50 kg competition at the 2026 European Karate Championships was held on 21 and 23 May 2026.

== Results ==
=== Finals ===
Semifinals
Elizaveta Grigoreva	4
(Bulgaria) Teodora Tsaneva	7
(Croatia) Ema Sgardelli	3
(France) Tiphaine Bonnarde	0

Final
(Bulgaria) Teodora Tsaneva	1
(Croatia) Ema Sgardelli	5

=== Repechage ===
Repechage 1
(Netherlands) Samina Yalçın	3
(Portugal) Sara Leal	3

Repechage 2
(Portugal) Sara Leal	1
(Italy) Erminia Perfetto	4

Bronze medal
(Italy) Erminia Perfetto	15
Elizaveta Grigoreva	7

Repechage 1
(Slovenia) Maša Magajna	2
(Romania) Patricia Nastas	5

Repechage 2
(Romania) Patricia Nastas	1
(Spain) Mireia Vizuete	1

Bronze medal
(Romania) Patricia Nastas	6
(France) Tiphaine Bonnarde	6

=== Top half ===
==== Section 1 ====
Round of 64
(Georgia (country)) Mariami Vasadze	1
(Lithuania) Gerda Petrauskaitė	4

Round of 32
(Lithuania) Gerda Petrauskaitė	2
(Latvia) Aleksandra Mihailova	3
(Turkey) Hira Nur Temizel	2
Elizaveta Grigoreva	10
(North Macedonia) Iva Pecevska	1
(Cyprus) Irene Kontou	9
(Slovakia) Natália Vargová	2
(Germany) Shara Hubrich	0

Round of 16
(Latvia) Aleksandra Mihailova	0
Elizaveta Grigoreva	2
(Cyprus) Irene Kontou	5
(Slovakia) Natália Vargová	2

Quarterfinals
Elizaveta Grigoreva	1
(Cyprus) Irene Kontou	0

==== Section 2 ====
Round of 32
(Bulgaria) Teodora Tsaneva	4
(Netherlands) Samina Yalçın	2
(Portugal) Sara Leal	3
(Serbia) Lidija Trmčić	1
(England) Niamh Cosgrove	5
(Montenegro) Lana Vukčević	4
(Greece) Christina Pappa	5
(Italy) Erminia Perfetto	10

Round of 16
(Bulgaria) Teodora Tsaneva	1
(Portugal) Sara Leal	1
(England) Niamh Cosgrove	4
(Italy) Erminia Perfetto	9

Quarterfinals
(Bulgaria) Teodora Tsaneva	6
(Italy) Erminia Perfetto	0

=== Bottom half ===
==== Section 3 ====
Round of 32
(Spain) Mireia Vizuete	3
(Kosovo) Albulena Gërvalla	1
(Ukraine) Yuliia Palashevska	8
(Moldova) Elena Berezovscaia	0
(Romania) Patricia Nastas	6
(Azerbaijan) Fatima Mammadova	0
(Slovenia) Maša Magajna	0
(Croatia) Ema Sgardelli	8

Round of 16
(Spain) Mireia Vizuete	1
(Ukraine) Yuliia Palashevska	0
(Romania) Patricia Nastas	0
(Croatia) Ema Sgardelli	2

Quarterfinals
(Spain) Mireia Vizuete	0
(Croatia) Ema Sgardelli	8

==== Section 4 ====
Round of 32
(Luxembourg) Lana Jadin	2
(France) Tiphaine Bonnarde	6
(Bosnia and Herzegovina) Ajla Mešković	2
(Republic of Ireland) Lucy Mulhern	3
Ulyana Markava	1
(Poland) Zuzanna Bernaciak	3
(Switzerland) Maya Schärer	0
(Sweden) Agnes Nyman	1

Round of 16
(France) Tiphaine Bonnarde	1
(Republic of Ireland) Lucy Mulhern	0
(Poland) Zuzanna Bernaciak	1
(Sweden) Agnes Nyman	2

Quarterfinals
(France) Tiphaine Bonnarde	4
(Sweden) Agnes Nyman	2
