= 2025 European Karate Championships – Women's 50 kg =

European Karate Championship

Women's 50 kg at the 2025 European Karate Championships
- Venue: Karen Demirchyan Sports and Concerts Complex
- Location: Yerevan, Armenia
- Dates: 8, 10 May
- Competitors: 28 from 28 nations

Medalists
gold medal	Ema Sgardelli	Croatia
silver medal	Erminia Perfetto	Italy
bronze medal	Aleksandra Mihailova	Latvia
bronze medal	Shara Hubrich	Germany

The Women's 50 kg competition at the 2025 European Karate Championships was held on 8 and 10 May 2025.

== Results ==
=== Finals ===
Semifinals
(Italy) Erminia Perfetto	7
(Latvia) Aleksandra Mihailova	1
(France) Tiphaine Bonnarde	3
(Croatia) Ema Sgardelli	4

Final
(Italy) Erminia Perfetto	5
(Croatia) Ema Sgardelli	7

=== Repechage ===
Repechage
(Poland) Zuzanna Bernaciak	3
(Ukraine) Yuliia Palashevska	9

Bronze medal
(Ukraine) Yuliia Palashevska	4
(Latvia) Aleksandra Mihailova	4

Repechage
(Turkey) Gülsen Demirtürk	0
(Germany) Shara Hubrich	2

Bronze medal
(Germany) Shara Hubrich	5
(France) Tiphaine Bonnarde	0

=== Top half ===
==== Section 1 ====
Round of 32
(Israel) Coral Amos	3
(Serbia) Lidija Trmčić	0
(Ukraine) Yuliia Palashevska	2
(Bulgaria) Teodora Tsaneva	1
(Poland) Zuzanna Bernaciak	3
(Portugal) Catarina Rodrigues	3

Round of 16
(Israel) Coral Amos	2
(Ukraine) Yuliia Palashevska	4
(Poland) Zuzanna Bernaciak	1
(Italy) Erminia Perfetto	9

Quarterfinals
(Ukraine) Yuliia Palashevska	1
(Italy) Erminia Perfetto	8

==== Section 2 ====
Round of 32
(Georgia (country)) Mariami Vasadze	0
(Romania) Andreea Cucu	1
(Latvia) Aleksandra Mihailova	3
(Austria) Bettina Plank	3
Valeriya Sergeeva	8
(Cyprus) Irene Kontou	2

Round of 16
(Romania) Andreea Cucu	1
(Latvia) Aleksandra Mihailova	2
(Cyprus) Irene Kontou	0
(Slovakia) Natália Vargová	5

Quarterfinals
(Latvia) Aleksandra Mihailova	5
(Slovakia) Natália Vargová	3

=== Bottom half ===
==== Section 3 ====
Round of 32
(Bosnia and Herzegovina) Sara Hodžić	4
(Kosovo) Redona Gashi	1
(Montenegro) Anja Jović	2
(Greece) Styliani Tzilia	6
(Spain) Mireia Vizuete	7
(Armenia) Yelena Gasparyan	4

Round of 16
(Bosnia and Herzegovina) Sara Hodžić	1
(Greece) Styliani Tzilia	4
(Spain) Mireia Vizuete	0
(France) Tiphaine Bonnarde	3

Quarterfinals
(Greece) Styliani Tzilia	0
(France) Tiphaine Bonnarde	2

==== Section 4 ====
Round of 32
(North Macedonia) Mihaela Mishovska	1
(Turkey) Gülsen Demirtürk	6
(Denmark) Erika Batakujevic	3
(England) Niamh Cosgrove	3
Ulyana Markava	1
(Germany) Shara Hubrich	9

Round of 16
(Turkey) Gülsen Demirtürk	5
(Denmark) Erika Batakujevic	0
(Germany) Shara Hubrich	0
(Croatia) Ema Sgardelli	0

Quarterfinals
(Turkey) Gülsen Demirtürk	3
(Croatia) Ema Sgardelli	3
