= 2026 European Karate Championships – Women's team kumite =

Women's team kumite at the 2026 European Karate Championships
- Venue: Eissporthalle Frankfurt
- Location: Frankfurt, Germany
- Dates: 21–24 May
- Nations: 32
- Teams: 32

Medalists
gold medal	Mia Bitsch; Shara Hubrich; Johanna Kneer; Hannah Riedel; Madeleine Schröter	Germany
silver medal	Monica Arzumian; Zera Jade Ozsertas; Chloé Payrot; Clémence Péa; Thalya Sombé	France
bronze medal	Aysu Aliyeva; Fatima Mammadova; Gulay Orujova; Madina Sadigova; Irina Zaretska	Azerbaijan
bronze medal	Sadea Bećirović; Nikolina Golomboš; Ema Sgardelli; Sara Tomić; Mia Greta Zorko	Croatia

The women's team kumite competition at the 2026 European Karate Championships was held from 21 to 24 May 2026.

== Results ==
=== Finals ===
Semifinals
Azerbaijan	0
France	2
Austria	1
Germany	2

Final
France	1
Germany	1

=== Repechage ===
Repechage 1
EKF-2	0
Ukraine	2

Repechage 2
Ukraine	2
EKF-1	0

Bronze medal
Ukraine	1
Azerbaijan	2

Repechage 1
North Macedonia	0
Croatia	2

Repechage 2
Croatia	2
Denmark	1

Bronze medal
Croatia	2
Austria	1

=== Top half ===
==== Section 1 ====
Round of 32
Poland	2
Sweden	1
Scotland	1
Azerbaijan	2
Greece	2
Spain	1
Montenegro	0
Kosovo	2

Round of 16
Poland	1
Azerbaijan	2
Greece	2
Kosovo	0

Quarterfinals
Azerbaijan	2
Greece	0

==== Section 2 ====
Round of 32
Turkey	2
Ireland	0
Cyprus	0
EKF-1	2
Latvia	0
Ukraine	2
EKF-2	0
France	2

Round of 16
Turkey	0
EKF-1	2
Ukraine	1
France	2

Quarterfinals
EKF-1	1
France	2

=== Bottom half ===
==== Section 3 ====
Round of 32
Bosnia and Herzegovina	0
Switzerland	2
Slovakia	0
Austria	2
Serbia	0
Luxembourg	0
Slovenia	0
Italy	2

Round of 16
Switzerland	1
Austria	2
Serbia	2
Italy	0

Quarterfinals
Austria	2
Serbia	0

==== Section 4 ====
Round of 32
Portugal	0
England	2
Denmark	2
Netherlands	1
Croatia	2
Hungary	1
North Macedonia	0
Germany	2

Round of 16
England	1
Denmark	2
Croatia	0
Germany	2

Quarterfinals
Denmark	0
Germany	2
