= 2026 European Karate Championships – Women's +68 kg =

Women's +68 kg at the 2026 European Karate Championships
- Venue: Eissporthalle Frankfurt
- Location: Frankfurt, Germany
- Dates: 20, 23 May
- Competitors: 32 from 32 nations

Medalists
| gold medal | Clio Ferracuti | Italy |
| silver medal | Clémence Péa | France |
| bronze medal | Zala Žibret | Slovenia |
| bronze medal | Johanna Kneer | Germany |

The women's +68 kg competition at the 2026 European Karate Championships was held on 20 and 23 May 2026.

== Results ==
=== Finals ===
Semifinals
(France) Clémence Péa | 1
(Slovenia) Zala Žibret | 0
(Greece) Kyriaki Kydonaki | 3
(Italy) Clio Ferracuti | 5

Final
(France) Clémence Péa | 2
(Italy) Clio Ferracuti | 10

=== Repechage ===
Repechage 1
Maryia Malakhava | 0
(Spain) María Torres | 2

Repechage 2
(Spain) María Torres | 4
(Montenegro) Jovana Damjanović | 7

Bronze medal
(Montenegro) Jovana Damjanović | 1
(Slovenia) Zala Žibret | 3

Repechage 1
(Belgium) Ophélie Mulolo | 0
(Germany) Johanna Kneer | 2

Repechage 2
(Germany) Johanna Kneer | 7
(Croatia) Nikolina Golomboš | 0

Bronze medal
(Germany) Johanna Kneer | 0
(Greece) Kyriaki Kydonaki | 0

=== Top half ===
==== Section 1 ====
Round of 32
(Azerbaijan) Aysel Gasimova | 2
(Republic of Ireland) Shauna Mahon | 0
(Montenegro) Jovana Damjanović | 0
(North Macedonia) Erdona Ziberi | 0
(France) Clémence Péa | 6
Maryia Malakhava | 0
(Turkey) Zeyna Gaballa | 0
(Spain) María Torres | 3

Round of 16
(Azerbaijan) Aysel Gasimova | 3
(Montenegro) Jovana Damjanović | 5
(France) Clémence Péa | 5
(Spain) María Torres | 0

Quarterfinals
(Montenegro) Jovana Damjanović | 1
(France) Clémence Péa | 3

==== Section 2 ====
Round of 32
(Ukraine) Dariia Bulay | 3
(Slovenia) Zala Žibret | 3
(Portugal) Ana Rita Oliveira | 0
(Slovakia) Vira Kuliková | 1
(Poland) Julia Daniszewska | 4
(Scotland) Niamh Junner | 6
Sunita Khalimova | 6
(England) Rochelle Walters | 3

Round of 16
(Slovenia) Zala Žibret | 1
(Slovakia) Vira Kuliková | 0
(Scotland) Niamh Junner | 0
Sunita Khalimova | 0

Quarterfinals
(Slovenia) Zala Žibret | 3
(Scotland) Niamh Junner | 0

=== Bottom half ===
==== Section 3 ====
Round of 32
(Kosovo) Fortesa Orana | 3
(Netherlands) Ingrid Creemers | 1
(Austria) Emma Schütze | 1
(Hungary) Dóra Fleischer | 5
(Serbia) Anja Radović | 4
(Norway) Hannah Stubsjøen | 4
(Switzerland) Fabienne Carneiro | 1
(Greece) Kyriaki Kydonaki | 2

Round of 16
(Kosovo) Fortesa Orana | 2
(Hungary) Dóra Fleischer | 0
(Norway) Hannah Stubsjøen | 1
(Greece) Kyriaki Kydonaki | 3

Quarterfinals
(Kosovo) Fortesa Orana | 0
(Greece) Kyriaki Kydonaki | 2

==== Section 4 ====
Round of 32
(Croatia) Nikolina Golomboš | 4
(Bosnia and Herzegovina) Stefani Krešić | 0
(Cyprus) Theodosia Giamouki | 4
(Denmark) Vanessa Henriksen | 2
(Belgium) Ophélie Mulolo | 0
(Italy) Clio Ferracuti | 3
(Romania) Maria Coman | 2
(Germany) Johanna Kneer | 5

Round of 16
(Croatia) Nikolina Golomboš | 3
(Cyprus) Theodosia Giamouki | 2
(Italy) Clio Ferracuti | 4
(Germany) Johanna Kneer | 2

Quarterfinals
(Croatia) Nikolina Golomboš | 4
(Italy) Clio Ferracuti | 4
