= 2023 World Karate Championships – Women's 50 kg =

Women's kumite 50 kg at the 2023 World Karate Championships
- Venue: László Papp Budapest Sports Arena
- Location: Budapest, Hungary
- Dates: 25, 28 October
- Competitors: 56 from 56 nations

Medalists
gold medal	Moldir Zhangbyrbay	Kazakhstan
silver medal	Erminia Perfetto	Italy
bronze medal	Reem Ahmed Salama	Egypt
bronze medal	Yorgelis Salazar	Venezuela

The women's kumite 50 kg competition at the 2023 World Karate Championships was held on 25 and 28 October 2023.

== Results ==
=== Finals ===
Semifinals
(China) Li Ranran	5
(Italy) Erminia Perfetto	7
(Kazakhstan) Moldir Zhangbyrbay	11
(Venezuela) Yorgelis Salazar	3

Final
(Italy) Erminia Perfetto	5
(Kazakhstan) Moldir Zhangbyrbay	6

=== Repechage ===
Repechage 1
(Mexico) Katia Salcido	4
(Saudi Arabia) Norah Al-Rashed	1

Repechage 2
(Mexico) Katia Salcido	5
(Egypt) Reem Ahmed Salama	11

Repechage 3
(Egypt) Reem Ahmed Salama	7
(Germany) Shara Hubrich	1

Bronze medal
(Egypt) Reem Ahmed Salama	7
(China) Li Ranran	1

Repechage 2
(Algeria) Cylia Ouikene	6
(Japan) Aika Okazaki	7

Repechage 3
(Japan) Aika Okazaki	6
(Slovakia) Natália Vargová	1

Bronze medal
(Japan) Aika Okazaki	3
(Venezuela) Yorgelis Salazar	8

=== Top half ===
==== Section 1 ====
First round
(Argentina) Yamila Benítez	9
(China) Li Ranran	2
(Paraguay) Leyla Servin	1
(Thailand) Chanyanut Chippensuk	2
(India) Nidhi Nanhet	1
(Romania) Andreea Cucu	1
(Croatia) Ema Sgardelli	7
(South Korea) Jung Ji-young	0
(United Arab Emirates) Hawraa Al-Ajmi
(Poland) Maria Depta	w/o
(Brazil) Juliana de Oliveira	1
(Azerbaijan) Fidan Teymurova	3

Second round
(China) Li Ranran	8
(Thailand) Chanyanut Chippensuk	8
(Romania) Andreea Cucu	0
(Ukraine) Kateryna Kryva	2
(Croatia) Ema Sgardelli	6
(Poland) Maria Depta	0
(Azerbaijan) Fidan Teymurova	5
(Hong Kong) Tsang Yee Ting	4

Third round
(China) Li Ranran	3
(Ukraine) Kateryna Kryva	0
(Croatia) Ema Sgardelli	2
(Azerbaijan) Fidan Teymurova	0

Quarterfinals
(China) Li Ranran	3
(Croatia) Ema Sgardelli	1

==== Section 2 ====
First round
(Cyprus) Irene Kontou	1
(Montenegro) Anja Jović	1
(Philippines) Junna Tsukii	6
(South Africa) Marinda Roetz	1
(Austria) Bettina Plank	0
(Colombia) Sofía Cárdenas	0
(Canada) Yamina Lahyanssa	1
(Saudi Arabia) Norah Al-Rashed	3
(Italy) Erminia Perfetto	10
(Mexico) Katia Salcido	7
(Spain) Nadia Gómez	6
Elizaveta Grigoreva	3

Second round
(Montenegro) Anja Jović	3
(Philippines) Junna Tsukii	1
(Austria) Bettina Plank	0
(Germany) Shara Hubrich	0
(Saudi Arabia) Norah Al-Rashed	1
(Italy) Erminia Perfetto	9
(Spain) Nadia Gómez	0
(Egypt) Reem Ahmed Salama	7

Third round
(Montenegro) Anja Jović	0
(Germany) Shara Hubrich	1
(Italy) Erminia Perfetto	12
(Egypt) Reem Ahmed Salama	4

Quarterfinals
(Germany) Shara Hubrich	2
(Italy) Erminia Perfetto	2

=== Bottom half ===
==== Section 3 ====
First round
(Portugal) Lea Barros	6
(Hungary) Réka Molnár	3
(Slovenia) Urša Haberl	2
(Slovakia) Natália Vargová	3
(Kosovo) Hatigje Zejnullahu	0
(Chile) Magdalena Godoy	9
(Macau) Ng Ka U	0
(Japan) Aika Okazaki	0
(Australia) Cecilia Tran	1
(Georgia (country)) Mariami Vasadze	2
(Algeria) Cylia Ouikene	1
(Chinese Taipei) Chan Hsin-yu	0

Second round
(Portugal) Lea Barros	0
(Slovakia) Natália Vargová	6
(Chile) Magdalena Godoy	16
(Morocco) Chaimae El Hayti	14
(Japan) Aika Okazaki	4
(Georgia (country)) Mariami Vasadze	1
(Algeria) Cylia Ouikene	3
(Kazakhstan) Moldir Zhangbyrbay	3

Third round
(Slovakia) Natália Vargová	8
(Chile) Magdalena Godoy	0
(Japan) Aika Okazaki	5
(Kazakhstan) Moldir Zhangbyrbay	6

Quarterfinals
(Slovakia) Natália Vargová	0
(Kazakhstan) Moldir Zhangbyrbay	3

==== Section 4 ====
First round
(France) Niswa Ahmed	3
(North Macedonia) Mihaela Mishovska	0
(Bosnia and Herzegovina) Adna Rebronja	3
(Greece) Styliani Tsilia	8
(Senegal) Adji Bineta Gueye	2
(Serbia) Tamara Grčić	5
(United States) Doralvis Delgado Lopez	6
(Scotland) Amy Luke	0
(England) Niamh Cosgrove	12
(Uzbekistan) Shakhrizoda Sunnatullayeva	8
(Latvia) Aleksandra Mihailova	1
(Iran) Sara Bahmanyar	1

Second round
(France) Niswa Ahmed	0
(Greece) Styliani Tsilia	2
(Serbia) Tamara Grčić	1
(Turkey) Serap Özçelik Arapoğlu	3
(United States) Doralvis Delgado Lopez	5
(England) Niamh Cosgrove	2
(Iran) Sara Bahmanyar	5
(Venezuela) Yorgelis Salazar	6

Third round
(Greece) Styliani Tsilia
(Turkey) Serap Özçelik Arapoğlu	0
(United States) Doralvis Delgado Lopez	0
(Venezuela) Yorgelis Salazar	2

Quarterfinals
(Turkey) Serap Özçelik Arapoğlu	5
(Venezuela) Yorgelis Salazar	5
