= 2023 European Karate Championships – Women's 50 kg =

European Karate Championship

Women's 50 kg at the 2023 European Karate Championships
- Venue: Palacio Multiusos de Guadalajara
- Location: Guadalajara, Spain
- Dates: 23, 25 March
- Competitors: 25 from 25 nations

Medalists
gold medal	Shara Hubrich	Germany
silver medal	Serap Özçelik	Turkey
bronze medal	Erminia Perfetto	Italy
bronze medal	Nadia Gómez	Spain

The Women's 50 kg competition at the 2023 European Karate Championships was held on 23 and 25 March 2023.

== Results ==
=== Finals ===
Semifinals
(Germany) Shara Hubrich	5
(Italy) Erminia Perfetto	3
(Spain) Nadia Gómez	2
(Turkey) Serap Özçelik	6

Final
(Germany) Shara Hubrich	1
(Turkey) Serap Özçelik	0

=== Repechage ===
Repechage
(Serbia) Tamara Grčić	0
(France) Niswa Ahmed	2

Bronze medal
(France) Niswa Ahmed	7
(Italy) Erminia Perfetto	7

Repechage
(Montenegro) Anja Jović	3
(Azerbaijan) Fidan Teymurova	5

Bronze medal
(Azerbaijan) Fidan Teymurova	0
(Spain) Nadia Gómez	9

=== Top half ===
==== Section 1 ====
Round of 32
(France) Niswa Ahmed	4
(Romania) Andreea Cucu	2
(Greece) Styliani Tzilia	1
(Cyprus) Irene Kontou	1
(Serbia) Tamara Grčić	1
(Hungary) Dalma Jakubovics	0

Round of 16
(France) Niswa Ahmed	2
(Cyprus) Irene Kontou	0
(Serbia) Tamara Grčić	0
(Germany) Shara Hubrich	0

Quarterfinals
(France) Niswa Ahmed	2
(Germany) Shara Hubrich	6

==== Section 2 ====
Round of 32
(Slovakia) Lucia Mrázová	2
(Bulgaria) Kristina Svilenova	1
(England) Niamh Cosgrove	6
(Latvia) Aleksandra Mihailova	2

Round of 16
(Slovakia) Lucia Mrázová	1
(Croatia) Jelena Pehar	7
(England) Niamh Cosgrove	3
(Italy) Erminia Perfetto	4

Quarterfinals
(Croatia) Jelena Pehar	4
(Italy) Erminia Perfetto	4

=== Bottom half ===
==== Section 3 ====
Round of 32
(Slovenia) Urša Haberl	2
(Israel) Coral Amos	5
(Spain) Nadia Gómez	5
(Bosnia and Herzegovina) Adnan Rebronja	1

Round of 16
(Israel) Coral Amos	3
(Ukraine) Kateryna Kryva	5
(Spain) Nadia Gómez	8
(Austria) Bettina Plank	2

Quarterfinals
(Ukraine) Kateryna Kryva	5
(Spain) Nadia Gómez	6

==== Section 4 ====
Round of 32
(Portugal) Catarina Rodrigues	1
(Poland) Maria Depta	1
(North Macedonia) Teodora Cvetkovska	0
(Montenegro) Anja Jović	6

Round of 16
(Portugal) Catarina Rodrigues	1
(Azerbaijan) Fidan Teymurova	1
(Montenegro) Anja Jović	2
(Turkey) Serap Özçelik	4

Quarterfinals
(Azerbaijan) Fidan Teymurova	1
(Turkey) Serap Özçelik	2
