= Karate at the 2025 World Games – Women's kumite 50 kg =

Women's kumite 50 kg at the 2025 World Games
- Venue: Jianyang Cultural and Sports Centre Gymnasium
- Location: Chengdu, China
- Dates: 8 August
- Competitors: 8 from 8 nations

Medalists
gold medal	Sara Bahmanyar	Iran
silver medal	Moldir Zhangbyrbay	Kazakhstan
bronze medal	Ema Sgardelli	Croatia

The women's kumite 50 kg competition in karate at the 2025 World Games took place on 8 August 2025 at the Jianyang Cultural and Sports Centre Gymnasium in Chengdu, China.

== Results ==
=== Pool round ===
==== Pool A ====
Pos	Athlete	B	W	D	D^{0}	L	Pts	Score	(Iran)	(Croatia)	(Italy)	(Canada)
1	Sara Bahmanyar (IRI)	3	3	0	0	0	9	20–7	—	4–0	11–3	5–4
2	Ema Sgardelli (CRO)	3	2	0	0	1	6	10–8	0–4	—	6–2	4–2
3	Erminia Perfetto (ITA)	3	1	0	0	2	3	15–22	3–11	2–6	—	10–5
4	Yamina Lahyanssa (CAN)	3	0	0	0	3	0	11–19	4–5	2–4	5–10	—

Source: Chengdu 2025

==== Pool B ====
Pos	Athlete	B	W	D	D^{0}	L	Pts	Score	(Kazakhstan)	(Algeria)	(China)	(Venezuela)
1	Moldir Zhangbyrbay (KAZ)	3	2	0	0	1	6 (Note: Zhangbyrbay (KAZ) 1–1, Ouikene (ALG) 1–1, Wang (CHN) 1–1. Scores obtained: Zhangbyrbay 7, Wang 6, Ouikene 5. Ouikene 2–0 Wang.)	7–1	—	4–0	0–1	3–0
2	Cylia Ouikene (ALG)	3	2	0	0	1	6	5–5	0–4	—	2–0	3–1
3	Wang Junhui (CHN)	3	2	0	0	1	6	6–6	1–0	0–2	—	5–4
4	Yorgelis Salazar (VEN)	3	0	0	0	3	0	5–11	0–3	1–3	4–5	—

Source: Chengdu 2025

=== Finals ===
Semi-finals
Cylia Ouikene (ALG)	3
Sara Bahmanyar (IRI)	4
Ema Sgardelli (CRO)	2
Moldir Zhangbyrbay (KAZ)	3

Gold medal bout
Sara Bahmanyar (IRI)	0
Moldir Zhangbyrbay (KAZ)	0
Bronze medal bout
Cylia Ouikene (ALG)	3
Ema Sgardelli (CRO)	6
