= Selva Küçükoğlu =

Turkish karateka (born 1996)

- Born: Selva Nur Akkurt; 16 March 1996 (age 30); Istanbul, Turkey
- Nationality: Turkish
- Height: 1.65 m (5 ft 5 in)
- Weight: 50 kg (110 lb)
- Style: Karate Kumite

Selva Nur Akkurt Küçükoğlu (born 16 March 1996) is a Turkish karateka competing in the kumite.

== Career ==
Selva Küçükoğlu won one of the bronze medals in the women's 50 kg event at the 2024 European Karate Championships held in Zadar, Croatia.
