= Karate at the 2018 Summer Youth Olympics – Girls' 53 kg =

Karate competition

Girls' Kumite 53 kg at the III Summer Youth Olympic Games
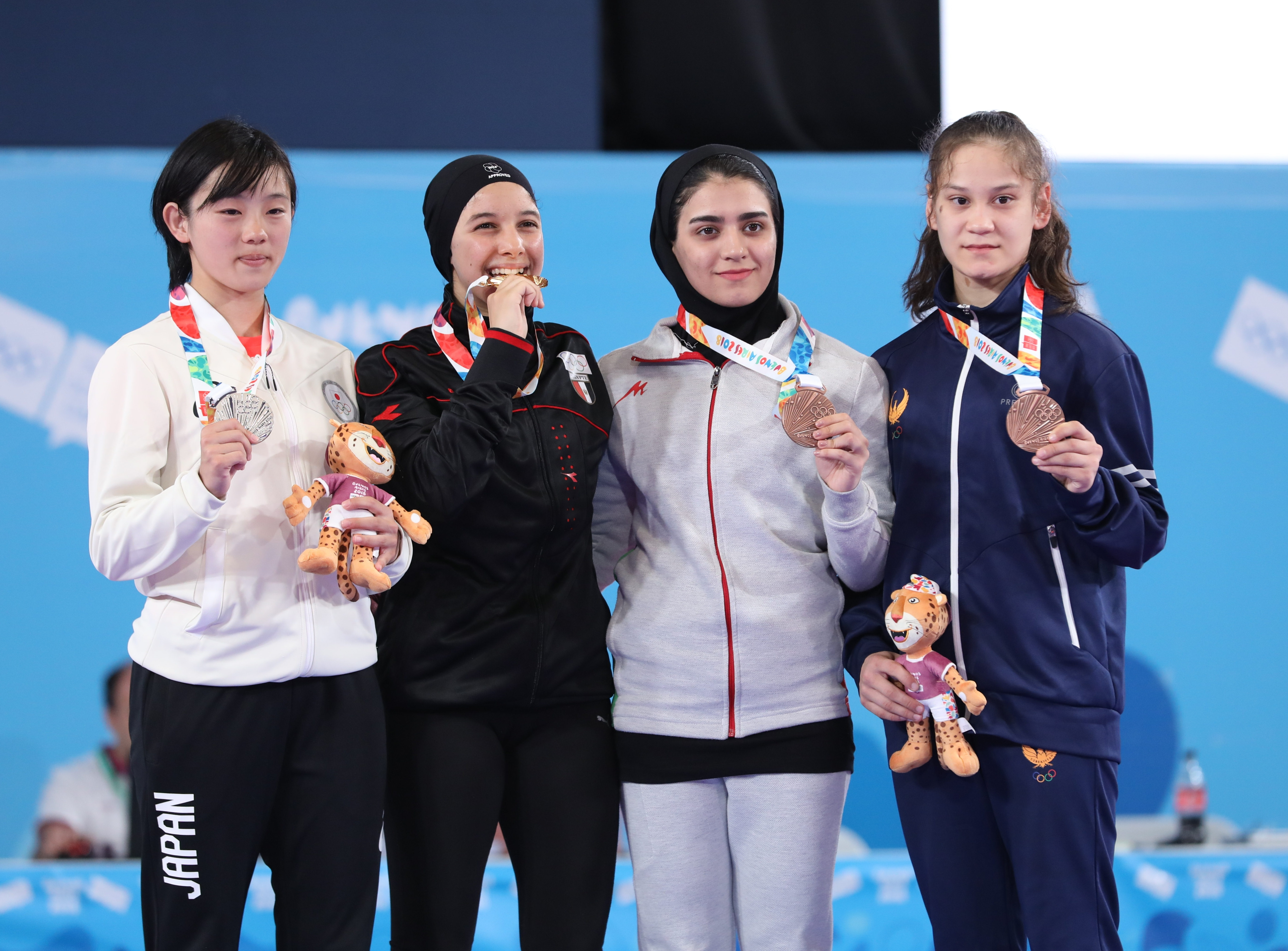
- Venue: Europa Pavilion
- Date: 17 October
- Competitors: 8 from 8 nations

Medalists
1st place, gold medalist(s)		Yasmin Nasr Elgewily	Egypt
2nd place, silver medalist(s)		Rinka Tahata	Japan
3rd place, bronze medalist(s)		Fatemeh Khonakdar	Iran
3rd place, bronze medalist(s)		Dildora Alikulova	Uzbekistan

The girls' kumite –53 kg competition at the 2018 Summer Youth Olympics was held on 17 October at the Europa Pavilion in Buenos Aires, Argentina.

== Schedule ==
All times are local (UTC-3).

Date	Time	Round
Wednesday, 17 October	10:00	Elimination round
Wednesday, 17 October	15:00	Semifinals
Wednesday, 17 October	15:42	Final

== Results ==
=== Elimination round ===
==== Pool A ====
Rank	Athlete	B	W	D	L	Pts	Score
1	Yasmin Nasr Elgewily (EGY)	3	2	1	0	5	9–1
2	Dildora Alikulova (UZB)	3	1	2	0	4	1–0
3	Damla Ocak (TUR)	3	1	0	2	2	3–3
4	Catalina Valdés (CHI)	3	0	1	2	1	0–9

	Score	
Damla Ocak (TUR)	0–1	Dildora Alikulova (UZB)
Catalina Valdés (CHI)	0–7	Yasmin Nasr Elgewily (EGY)
Catalina Valdés (CHI)	0–0	Dildora Alikulova (UZB)
Damla Ocak (TUR)	1–2	Yasmin Nasr Elgewily (EGY)
Yasmin Nasr Elgewily (EGY)	0–0	Dildora Alikulova (UZB)
Damla Ocak (TUR)	2–0	Catalina Valdés (CHI)

==== Pool B ====
Rank	Athlete	B	W	D	L	Pts	Score
1	Rinka Tahata (JPN)	3	3	0	0	6	6–3
2	Fatemeh Khonakdar (IRI)	3	2	0	1	4	8–1
3	Aika Okazaki (THA)	3	1	0	2	2	5–5
4	Tânia de Barros (POR)	3	0	0	3	0	0–10

	Score	
Rinka Tahata (JPN)	3–3	Aika Okazaki (THA)
Fatemeh Khonakdar (IRI)	6–0	Tânia de Barros (POR)
Fatemeh Khonakdar (IRI)	2–0	Aika Okazaki (THA)
Rinka Tahata (JPN)	2–0	Tânia de Barros (POR)
Tânia de Barros (POR)	0–2	Aika Okazaki (THA)
Rinka Tahata (JPN)	1–0	Fatemeh Khonakdar (IRI)

=== Semifinals ===
	Score	
Yasmin Nasr Elgewily (EGY)	5–0	Fatemeh Khonakdar (IRI)
Rinka Tahata (JPN)	2–0	Dildora Alikulova (UZB)

=== Final ===
	Score	
Yasmin Nasr Elgewily (EGY)	2–1	Rinka Tahata (JPN)

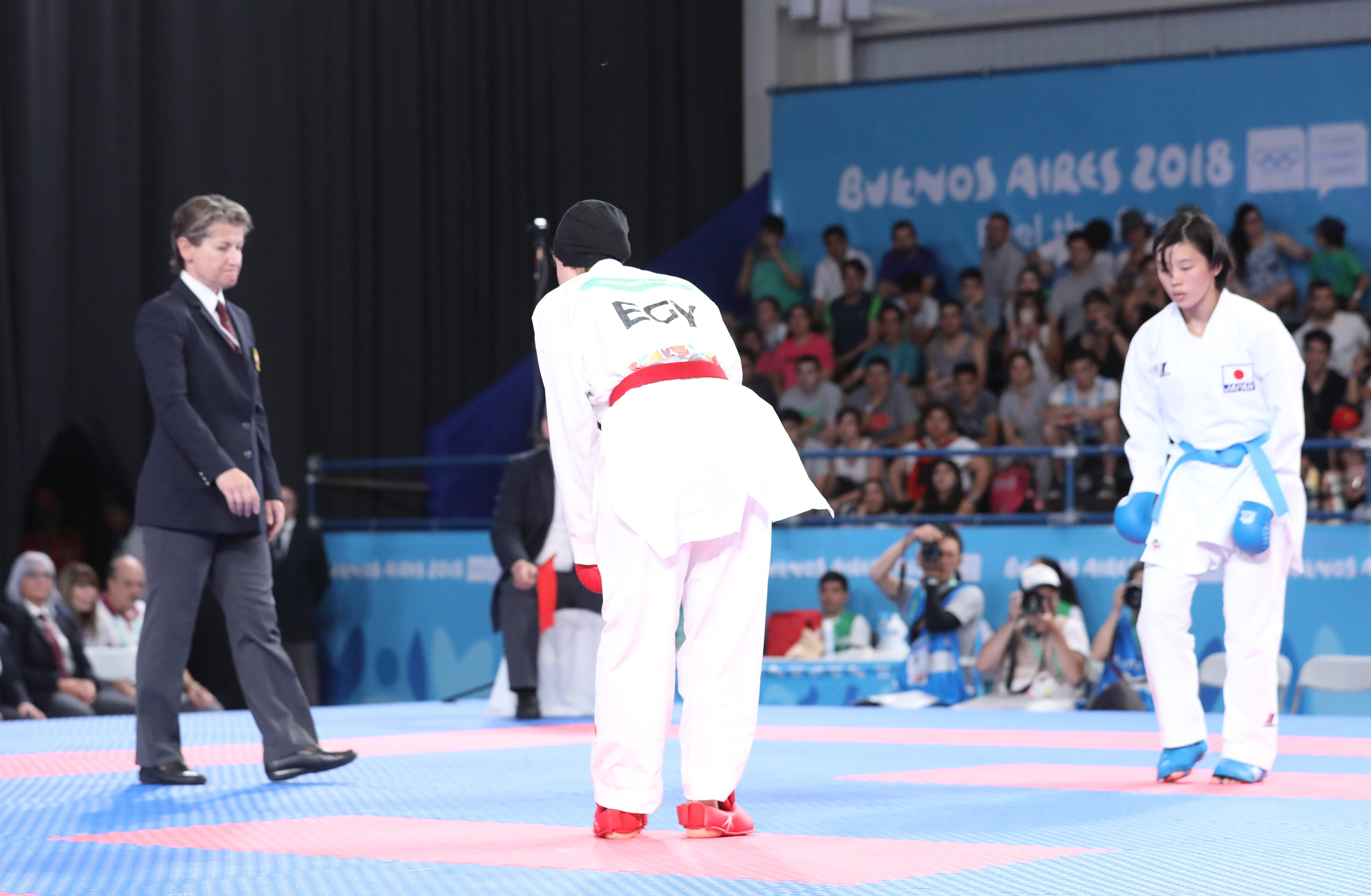
Begin of the fight between Yasmin Nasr Elgewily and Rinka Tahata

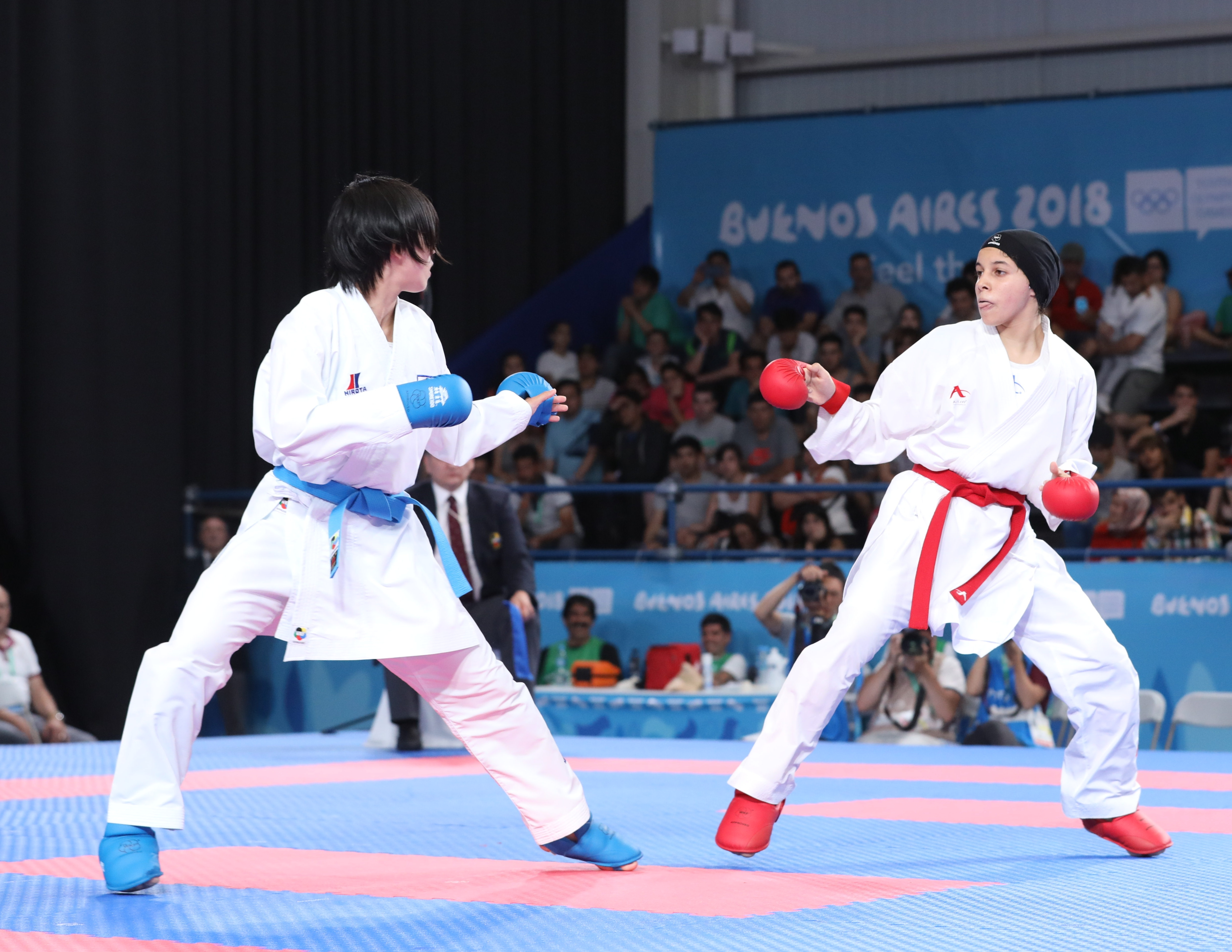
Yasmin Nasr Elgewily and Rinka Tahata facing each other

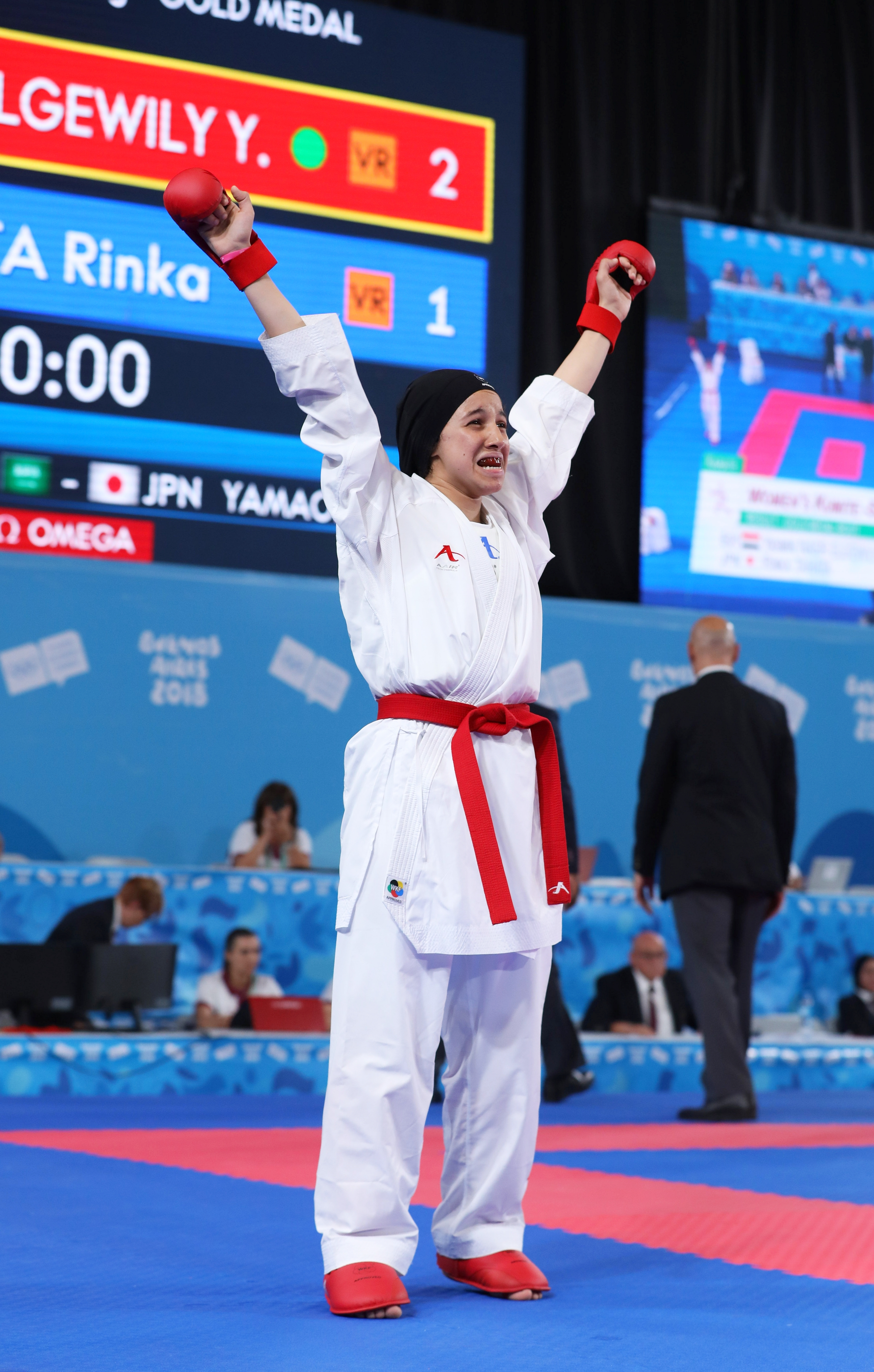
Yasmin Nasr Elgewily celebrating her victory

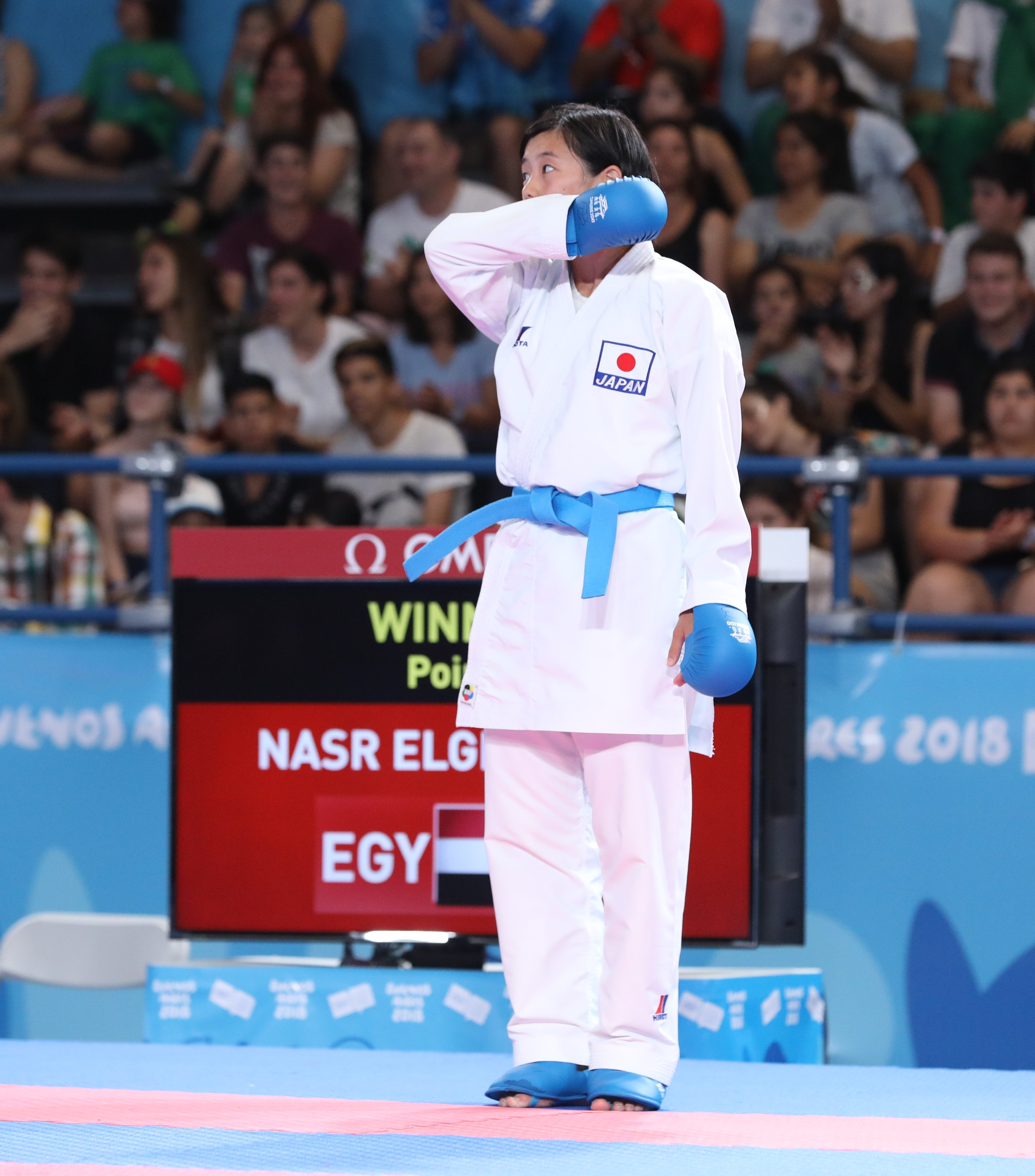
Rinka Tahata disappointed after losing the fight
