= Karate at the 2025 World Games – Women's kumite +68 kg =

Women's kumite +68 kg at the 2025 World Games
- Venue: Jianyang Cultural and Sports Centre Gymnasium
- Location: Chengdu, China
- Dates: 9 August
- Competitors: 8 from 8 nations

Medalists
gold medal	Johanna Kneer	Germany
silver medal	María Torres	Spain
bronze medal	Clio Ferracuti	Italy

The women's kumite +68 kg competition in karate at the 2025 World Games took place on 9 August 2025 at the Jianyang Cultural and Sports Centre Gymnasium in Chengdu, China.

== Results ==
=== Pool round ===
==== Pool A ====
Pos	Athlete	B	W	D	D^{0}	L	Pts	Score	(Italy)	(Kazakhstan)	(France)	(China)
1	Clio Ferracuti (ITA)	3	3	0	0	0	9	20–7	—	8–6	3–0	9–1
2	Sofya Berultseva (KAZ)	3	2	0	0	1	6	16–12	6–8	—	5–2	5–2
3	Nancy Garcia (FRA)	3	1	0	0	2	3	8–10	0–3	2–5	—	6–2
4	Xu Qiqi (CHN)	3	0	0	0	3	0	5–20	1–9	2–5	2–6	—

Source: Chengdu 2025

==== Pool B ====
Pos	Athlete	B	W	D	D^{0}	L	Pts	Score	(Spain)	(Germany)	(Egypt)	(Australia)
1	María Torres (ESP)	3	3	0	0	0	9	8–3	—	1–1	4–1	3–1
2	Johanna Kneer (GER)	3	2	0	0	1	6	15–8	1–1	—	8–4	6–3
3	Menna Okila (EGY)	3	1	0	0	2	3	13–12	1–4	4–8	—	8–0
4	Hannah Sullivan (AUS)	3	0	0	0	3	0	4–17	1–3	3–6	0–8	—

Source: Chengdu 2025

=== Finals ===
Semi-finals
Johanna Kneer (GER)	5
Clio Ferracuti (ITA)	4
Sofya Berultseva (KAZ)	1
María Torres (ESP)	2

Gold medal bout
Johanna Kneer (GER)	3
María Torres (ESP)	0
Bronze medal bout
Clio Ferracuti (ITA)	4
Sofya Berultseva (KAZ)	4
