= 2025 European Karate Championships – Women's team kumite =

European Karate Championship

Women's team kumite at the 2025 European Karate Championships
- Venue: Karen Demirchyan Complex
- Location: Yerevan, Armenia
- Dates: 8–10 May
- Nations: 30

Medalists
gold medal	Johanna Kneer; Shara Hubrich; Mia Bitsch; Hannah Riedel; Madeleine Schröter	Germany
silver medal	Thalya Sombe; Sydney Yvon; Natanaële Flamand; Clémence Péa; Jenna Touvrey	France
bronze medal	Viola Lallo; Silvia Semeraro; Clio Ferracuti; Veronica Brunori; Sofia Ferrarini	Italy
bronze medal	Elmedina Istogu; Vlera Qerimi; Fortesa Orana; Behije Mustafa	Kosovo

The Women's team kumite competition at the 2025 European Karate Championships was held from 8 to 10 May 2025.

== Results ==
=== Final ===
Final
France	0
Germany	2

=== Top half ===
Round of 32
Netherlands	2
Poland	0
Slovakia	2
Denmark	0
Romania	2
Cyprus	0
Austria	0
France	2
Serbia	2
Hungary	1
Slovenia	2
Montenegro	0
Switzerland	1
Croatia	2

Round of 16
Netherlands	0
Slovakia	2
Romania	0
France	2
Serbia	2
Slovenia	1
Croatia	0
Italy	2

Quarterfinals
Slovakia	1
France	2
Serbia	0
Italy	2

Semifinals
France	2
Italy	0

=== Bottom half ===
Round of 32
Latvia	0
Greece	2
Finland	0
England	2
Sweden	2
Bosnia and Herzegovina	1
North Macedonia	2
Turkey	0
Ukraine	0
Kosovo	2
Spain	2
Scotland	1
Armenia	2
Georgia	0

Round of 16
Greece	2
England	0
Sweden	1
North Macedonia	2
Kosovo	2
Spain	0
Armenia	0
Germany	2

Quarterfinals
Greece	2
North Macedonia	0
Kosovo	1
Germany	1

Semifinals
Greece	0
Germany	2

=== Repechage ===
Repechage round 1
Romania	0
Austria	2

Repechage round 2
Slovakia	0
Austria	2
Armenia	0
Kosovo	2

Bronze medals
Italy	2
Austria	1
Greece	1
Kosovo	2
