= Yasmin Nasr Elgewily =

Egyptian karateka (born 2001)

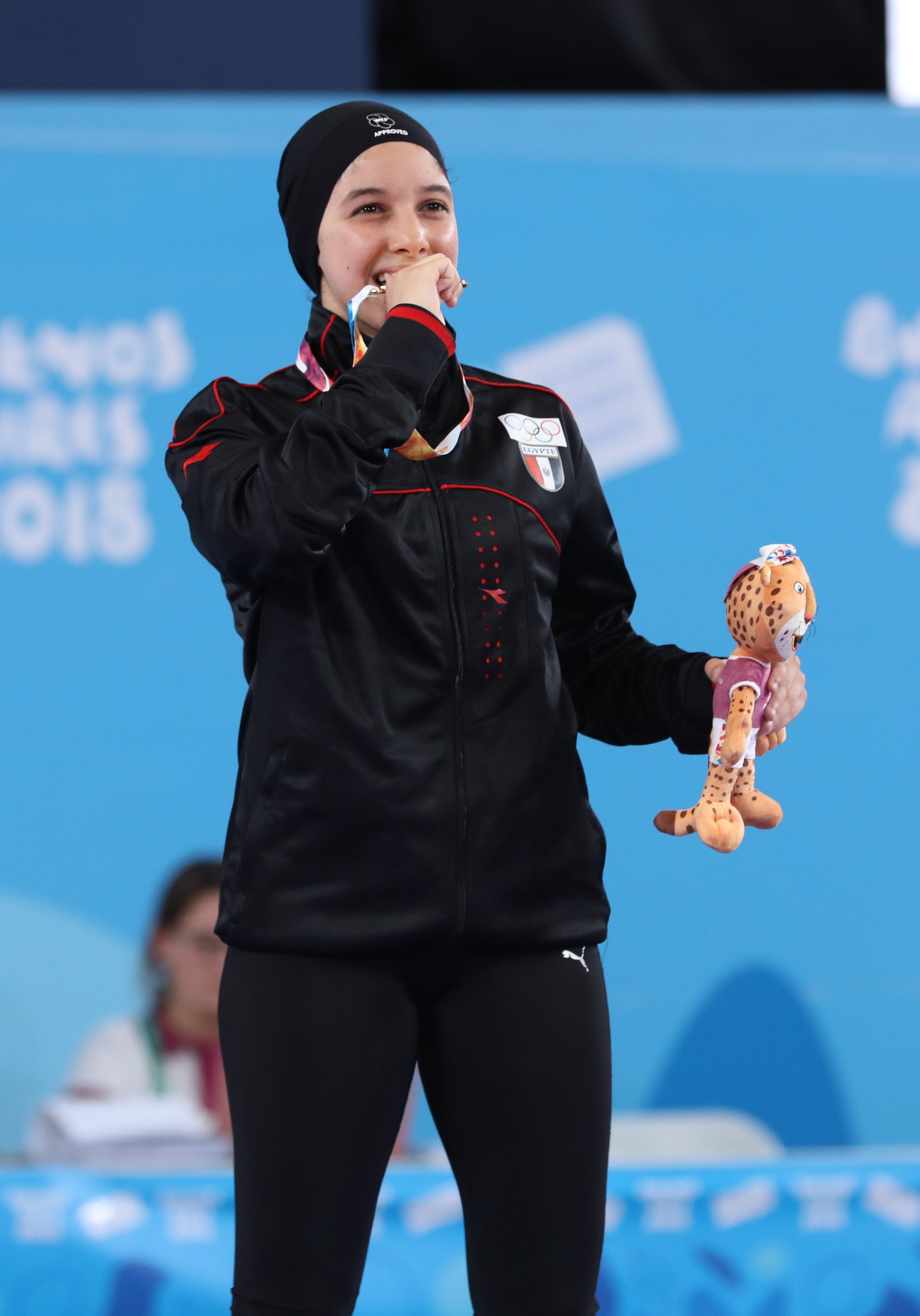
- Yasmin Nasr Elgewily in 2018

Personal information
- Born: 16 November 2001 (age 24)

Sport
- Country: Egypt
- Sport: Karate
- Weight class: 50 kg
- Event: Kumite
Medal record
Women's karate
Representing Egypt
World Championships
Bronze medal – third place	2021 Dubai	Kumite 50 kg
African Games
Gold medal – first place	2023 Accra	Kumite 50 kg
African Championships
Silver medal – second place	2021 Cairo	Kumite 50 kg
Summer Youth Olympics
Gold medal – first place	2018 Buenos Aires	Kumite 53 kg

Yasmin Nasr Elgewily (born 16 November 2001) is an Egyptian karateka, a native of El-Hagnaya village in Damanhour district, Beheira Governorate. She won one of the bronze medals in the women's 50 kg event at the 2021 World Karate Championships held in Dubai, United Arab Emirates.

== Career ==
Yasmine began her karate journey at the Hagnaya Youth Center, where she trained under the guidance of coach Mohamed El Gohary.

In 2018, she won the gold medal in the girls' 53 kg event at the Summer Youth Olympics held in Buenos Aires, Argentina. She also clinched first place in Junior Female Kumite 2019 at the World Karate Championships held in Santiago, Chile.

In 2021, she won the gold medal in the women's 50 kg event at the Mediterranean Karate Championships held in Limassol, Cyprus. She won the silver medal in her event at the 2021 African Karate Championships held in Cairo, Egypt.

She won the gold medal in her event at the 2023 African Games held in Accra, Ghana. She defeated Cylia Ouikene of Algeria in her gold medal match.

== Weight ==
50 kilogram (kg).

== Achievements ==
Year	Competition	Venue	Rank	Event
2018	Summer Youth Olympics	Buenos Aires, Argentina	1st	Kumite 53 kg
2019	2019 World Championships	Santiago, Chile	1st	Kumite 48 kg
2021	World Championships	Dubai, United Arab Emirates	3rd	Kumite 50 kg
2021	African Karate Championships	Cairo, Egypt	2nd	Kumite 50 kg
2024	African Games	Accra, Ghana	1st	Kumite 50 kg

== Awards ==
In honor of her accomplishments in 2019, she was awarded the First Class Sports Medal by Egyptian President Abdel Fattah El-Sisi, one of the country's highest sporting honors.
