= Sara Bahmanyar =

Iranian karateka (born 1999)

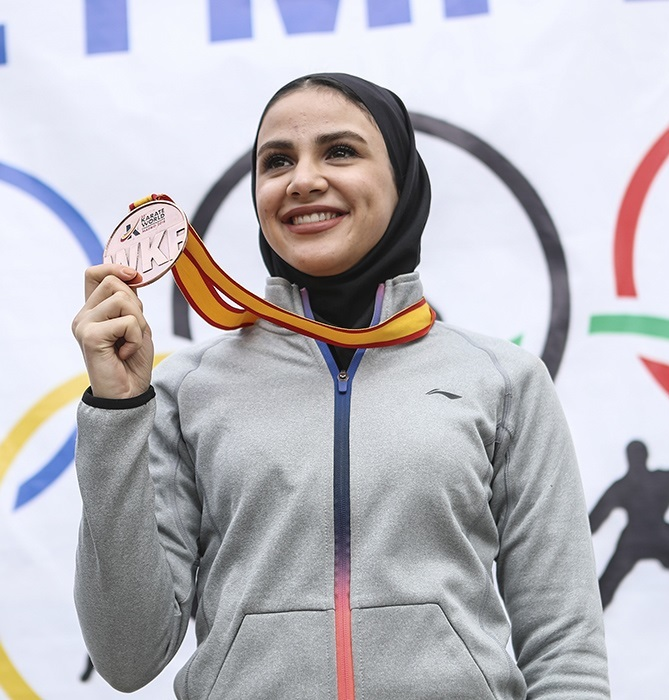
- Sara Bahmanyar in 2018

Personal information
- Native name: سارا بهمنیار
- Born: 21 March 1999 (age 27) Astaneh-ye Ashrafiyeh, Iran

Sport
- Country: Iran
- Sport: Karate
- Weight class: 50 kg
- Events: Kumite; Team kumite
Medal record
Women's karate
Representing Iran
World Games
Gold medal – first place	2025 Chengdu	Kumite 50 kg
World Championships
Bronze medal – third place	2018 Madrid	Kumite 50 kg
Bronze medal – third place	2025 Cairo	Kumite 50 kg
Asian Games
Bronze medal – third place	2022 Hangzhou	Kumite 50 kg
Asian Championships
Gold medal – first place	2026 Bali	Team kumite
Bronze medal – third place	2022 Tashkent	Kumite 50 kg
Bronze medal – third place	2023 Malacca	Kumite 50 kg
Bronze medal – third place	2025 Tashkent	Kumite 50 kg
Bronze medal – third place	2025 Tashkent	Team kumite
Islamic Solidarity Games
Gold medal – first place	2025 Riyadh	Kumite 50 kg
Bronze medal – third place	2021 Konya	Kumite 50 kg

Sara Bahmanyar (Persian: سارا بهمنیار, born 21 March 1999) is an Iranian karateka. She won one of the bronze medals in the women's kumite 50 kg event at the 2018 World Karate Championships held in Madrid, Spain.

Bahmanyar represented Iran at the 2020 Summer Olympics in Tokyo, Japan in the women's kumite 55 kg event.

Bahmanyar won one of the bronze medals in her event at the 2022 Asian Karate Championships held in Tashkent, Uzbekistan. She also won one of the bronze medals in her event at the 2023 Asian Karate Championships held in Melaka, Malaysia. She won one of the bronze medals in the women's 50 kg event at the 2022 Asian Games held in Hangzhou, China. She defeated Miho Miyahara of Japan in her bronze medal match.

Bahmanyar won the gold medal in the women's 50 kg event at the 2025 World Games held in Chengdu, China. She defeated Moldir Zhangbyrbay of Kazakhstan in her gold medal match.

== Achievements ==
Year	Competition	Venue	Rank	Event
2018	World Championships	Madrid, Spain	3rd	Kumite 50 kg
2022	Islamic Solidarity Games	Konya, Turkey	3rd	Kumite 50 kg
2022	Asian Championships	Tashkent, Uzbekistan	3rd	Kumite 50 kg
2023	Asian Championships	Malacca, Malaysia	3rd	Kumite 50 kg
2023	Asian Games	Hangzhou, China	3rd	Kumite 50 kg
2025	Asian Championships	Tashkent, Uzbekistan	3rd	Kumite 50 kg
2025	Asian Championships	Tashkent, Uzbekistan	3rd	Team kumite
2025	World Games	Chengdu, China	1st	Kumite 50 kg
