= 2022 European Karate Championships – Women's 50 kg =

European Karate Championship

Women's 50 kg at the 2022 European Karate Championships
- Venue: Karataş Şahinbey Sport Hall
- Location: Gaziantep, Turkey
- Dates: 26–28 May
- Competitors: 25 from 25 nations

Medalists
gold medal	Serap Özçelik	Turkey
silver medal	Erminia Perfetto	Italy
bronze medal	Niswa Ahmed	France
bronze medal	Jelena Pehar	Croatia

The Women's 50 kg competition at the 2022 European Karate Championships was held from 26 to 28 May 2022.

== Results ==
=== Finals ===
Semifinals
(Italy) Erminia Perfetto	6
(Luxembourg) Laura Hoffmann	2
(Croatia) Jelena Pehar	1
(Turkey) Serap Özçelik	5

Final
(Italy) Erminia Perfetto	5
(Turkey) Serap Özçelik	9

=== Repechage ===
Repechage 1
(Cyprus) Irene Kontou	5
(Spain) Alba Pinilla	2

Repechage 2
(Cyprus) Irene Kontou	0
(France) Niswa Ahmed	2

Bronze medal
(France) Niswa Ahmed	5
(Luxembourg) Laura Hoffmann	0

Repechage 2
(Bosnia and Herzegovina) Lejla Ahmetović	7
(Azerbaijan) Inji Azizova	0

Bronze medal
(Bosnia and Herzegovina) Lejla Ahmetović	0
(Croatia) Jelena Pehar	0

=== Top half ===
==== Section 1 ====
Round of 32
(Spain) Alba Pinilla	1
(Slovakia) Lucia Kováčiková	0
(Cyprus) Irene Kontou	0
(Italy) Erminia Perfetto	0
(Israel) Coral Amos	0
(France) Niswa Ahmed	5

Round of 16
(Spain) Alba Pinilla	0
(Italy) Erminia Perfetto	6
(France) Niswa Ahmed	2
(Romania) Andreea Cucu	1

Quarterfinals
(Italy) Erminia Perfetto	4
(France) Niswa Ahmed	2

==== Section 2 ====
Round of 32
(Poland) Maria Depta	0
(Bulgaria) Kristina Svilenova	2
(Kosovo) Redona Gashi	6
(Switzerland) Nur Kars	5

Round of 16
(Bulgaria) Kristina Svilenova	1
(Luxembourg) Laura Hoffmann	4
(Kosovo) Redona Gashi	0
(Germany) Shara Hubrich	3

Quarterfinals
(Luxembourg) Laura Hoffmann
(Kosovo) Redona Gashi

=== Bottom half ===
==== Section 3 ====
Round of 32
(Montenegro) Anja Jović	1
(Slovenia) Urša Haberl	2
(Serbia) Suzana Lučić	0
(Croatia) Jelena Pehar	2

Round of 16
(Slovenia) Urša Haberl	2
(Austria) Bettina Plank	2
(Croatia) Jelena Pehar	5
(Ukraine) Kateryna Kryva	3

Quarterfinals
(Slovenia) Urša Haberl	1
(Croatia) Jelena Pehar	2

==== Section 4 ====
Round of 32
(Latvia) Aleksandra Mihailova	2
(Azerbaijan) Inji Azizova	9
(Bosnia and Herzegovina) Lejla Ahmetović	6
(Greece) Styliani Tzilia	3

Round of 16
(Azerbaijan) Inji Azizova	1
(Portugal) Sara Leal	0
(Bosnia and Herzegovina) Lejla Ahmetović	0
(Turkey) Serap Özçelik	3

Quarterfinals
(Azerbaijan) Inji Azizova	2
(Turkey) Serap Özçelik	10
