= Karate at the 2023 European Games – Women's kumite 50 kg =

Women's kumite 50 kg at the 2023 European Games
- Venue: Bielsko-Biała Arena
- Date: 22 June
- Competitors: 8 from 8 nations

Medalists
gold medal	Bettina Plank	Austria
silver medal	Erminia Perfetto	Italy
bronze medal	Irene Kontou	Cyprus
bronze medal	Serap Özçelik Arapoğlu	Turkey

The women's kumite 50 kg competition at the 2023 European Games was held on 22 June 2023 at the Bielsko-Biała Arena.

== Results ==
=== Elimination round ===
Pool A

Pos	Athlete	B	W	D	D^{0}	L	Pts	Score	(Italy)	(Turkey)	(Azerbaijan)	(Germany)
1	Erminia Perfetto (ITA)	3	2	0	1	0	6	9–5	—	4–4	5–1	0–0
2	Serap Özçelik Arapoğlu (TUR)	3	1	0	1	1	3 (Note: Özçelik Arapoğlu (TUR) 3–1 Teymurova (AZE))	7–5	4–4	—	3–1	0–0
3	Fidan Teymurova (AZE)	3	1	0	0	2	3	5–9	1–5	1–3	—	3–1
4	Shara Hubrich (GER)	3	0	0	2	1	0	1–3	0–0	0–0	1–3	—

Source: EG2023
Notes:

Pool B

Pos	Athlete	B	W	D	D^{0}	L	Pts	Score	(Austria)	(Cyprus)	(Ukraine)	(Poland)
1	Bettina Plank (AUT)	3	3	0	0	0	9	10–2	—	1–0	4–1	5–1
2	Irene Kontou (CYP)	3	2	0	0	1	6	7–1	0–1	—	3–0	4–0
3	Kateryna Kryva (UKR)	3	1	0	0	2	3	2–7	1–4	0–3	—	1–0
4	Maria Depta (POL)	3	0	0	0	3	0	1–10	1–5	0–4	0–1	—

Source: EG2023

=== Finals ===
Semifinals
Irene Kontou (CYP)	0
Erminia Perfetto (ITA)	1
Serap Özçelik Arapoğlu (TUR)	3
Bettina Plank (AUT)	5

Gold medal bout
Erminia Perfetto (ITA)	0
Bettina Plank (AUT)	1
