= Karate at the 2018 Asian Games – Women's kumite 50 kg =

Karate competition

Women's kumite 50 kg at the 2018 Asian Games
- Venue: Jakarta Convention Center
- Date: 27 August 2018
- Competitors: 16 from 16 nations

Medalists
gold medal	Gu Shiau-shuang	Chinese Taipei
silver medal	Bakhriniso Babaeva	Uzbekistan
bronze medal	Miho Miyahara	Japan
bronze medal	Junna Tsukii	Philippines

The women's kumite 50 kilograms competition at the 2018 Asian Games took place on 27 August 2018 at Jakarta Convention Center Plenary Hall, Jakarta, Indonesia.

== Schedule ==
All times are Western Indonesia Time (UTC+07:00)

Date	Time	Event
Monday, 27 August 2018	14:00	1/8 finals
Monday, 27 August 2018	14:00	Quarterfinals
Monday, 27 August 2018	14:00	Semifinals
Monday, 27 August 2018	14:00	Final of repechage
Monday, 27 August 2018	14:00	Finals

== Results ==
Legend

- H — Won by hansoku (8–0)

=== Main bracket ===
1/8 finals
Srunita Sari Sukatendel (INA)	8^{H}
Dinusha Kumari (SRI)	1
Miho Miyahara (JPN)	0
Tsang Yee Ting (HKG)	0
Gu Shiau-shuang (TPE)	3
Sirivimon Sirimoungkhoune (LAO)	0
Anu Adhikari (NEP)	5
Cheung I Ching (MAC)	1
Bakhriniso Babaeva (UZB)	2
Junna Tsukii (PHI)	1
Hawraa Al-Ajmi (UAE)	5
Benish Akbar (PAK)	0
Madhuri Poovanesan (MAS)	0
Moldir Zhangbyrbay (KAZ)	2
Paweena Raksachart (THA)	6^{H}
Daille de Jesus (TLS)	0

Quarterfinals
Srunita Sari Sukatendel (INA)	1
Miho Miyahara (JPN)	3
Gu Shiau-shuang (TPE)	7
Anu Adhikari (NEP)	2
Bakhriniso Babaeva (UZB)	5
Hawraa Al-Ajmi (UAE)	1
Moldir Zhangbyrbay (KAZ)	2
Paweena Raksachart (THA)	4

Semifinals
Miho Miyahara (JPN)	2
Gu Shiau-shuang (TPE)	4
Bakhriniso Babaeva (UZB)	1
Paweena Raksachart (THA)	0

Final
Gu Shiau-shuang (TPE)	3
Bakhriniso Babaeva (UZB)	2

=== Repechage ===
Final of repechage
Sirivimon Sirimoungkhoune (LAO)	1
Anu Adhikari (NEP)	3
Junna Tsukii (PHI)	4
Hawraa Al-Ajmi (UAE)	2

Bronze medals
Anu Adhikari (NEP)	0
Miho Miyahara (JPN)	9
Junna Tsukii (PHI)	4
Paweena Raksachart (THA)	1
