= Ema Sgardelli =

Croatian karateka (born 2004)

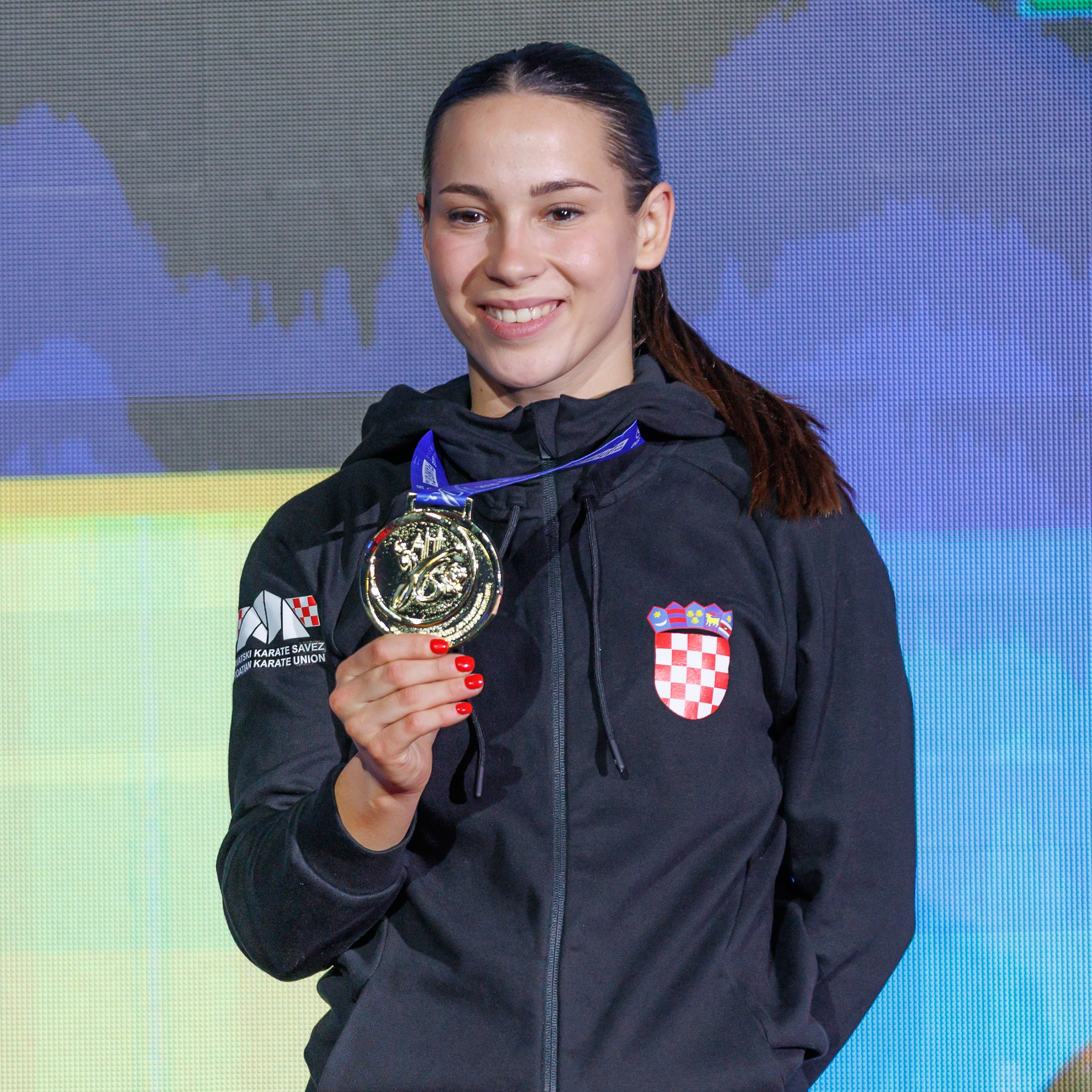

Personal information
- Born: 27 March 2004 (age 22)

Sport
- Country: Croatia
- Sport: Karate
- Weight class: 50 kg
- Event: Kumite
Medal record
Women's karate
Representing Croatia
World Games
Bronze medal – third place	2025 Chengdu	Kumite 50 kg
European Championships
Gold medal – first place	2024 Zadar	Kumite 50 kg
Gold medal – first place	2025 Yerevan	Kumite 50 kg
Gold medal – first place	2026 Frankfurt	Kumite 50 kg
Bronze medal – third place	2026 Frankfurt	Team kumite
Mediterranean Games
Bronze medal – third place	2026 Taranto	Kumite 50 kg

Ema Sgardelli (born 27 March 2004) is a Croatian karateka. She is a three-time gold medalist in the women's 50 kg event at the European Karate Championships (2024, 2025 and 2026).

Sgardelli competed in the women's 55 kg event at the 2022 European Karate Championships held in Gaziantep, Turkey. In 2023, she competed in the women's 50 kg event at the World Karate Championships held in Budapest, Hungary. She was eliminated in her fourth match.

Sgardelli won the gold medal in the women's 50 kg event at the 2024 European Karate Championships held in Zadar, Croatia. Sgardelli also won the gold medal in the women's 50 kg event at the 2025 European Karate Championships held in Yerevan, Armenia.

Sgardelli won the bronze medal in the women's 50 kg event at the 2025 World Games held in Chengdu, China. She defeated Cylia Ouikene of Algeria in her bronze medal match.

== Achievements ==
Year	Competition	Location	Rank	Event
2024	European Championships	Zadar, Croatia	1st	Kumite 50 kg
2025	European Championships	Yerevan, Armenia	1st	Kumite 50 kg
2025	World Games	Chengdu, China	3rd	Kumite 50 kg
2026	European Championships	Frankfurt, Germany	1st	Kumite 50 kg
2026	European Championships	Frankfurt, Germany	3rd	Team kumite
2026	Mediterranean Games	Taranto, Italy	3rd	Kumite 50 kg
