= Bakhriniso Babaeva =

Uzbekistani karateka (born 1997)

Personal information
- Born: 2 November 1997 (age 28)

Sport
- Country: Uzbekistan
- Sport: Karate
- Weight class: 50 kg
- Event: Kumite
Medal record
Women's karate
Representing Uzbekistan
Asian Games
Silver medal – second place	2018 Jakarta	Kumite 50 kg
Asian Championships
Gold medal – first place	2019 Tashkent	Kumite 50 kg
Bronze medal – third place	2017 Astana	Kumite 50 kg

Bakhriniso Babaeva (born 2 November 1997) is an Uzbekistani karateka. At the 2019 Asian Karate Championships held in Tashkent, Uzbekistan, she won the gold medal in the women's kumite 50 kg event.

== Career ==
At the 2017 Asian Karate Championships held in Astana, Kazakhstan, she won one of the bronze medals in the women's kumite 50 kg event. In 2018, she won the silver medal in the women's kumite 50 kg event at the Asian Games held in Jakarta, Indonesia. In the final, she lost against Gu Shiau-shuang of Chinese Taipei.

In June 2021, she competed at the World Olympic Qualification Tournament held in Paris, France hoping to qualify for the 2020 Summer Olympics in Tokyo, Japan. She was eliminated in her second match by Sara Cardin of Italy. In November 2021, she was eliminated in her third match in the women's 50 kg event at the World Karate Championships held in Dubai, United Arab Emirates.

== Achievements ==
Year	Competition	Venue	Rank	Event
2017	Asian Championships	Astana, Kazakhstan	3rd	Kumite 50 kg
2018	Asian Games	Jakarta, Indonesia	2nd	Kumite 50 kg
2019	Asian Championships	Tashkent, Uzbekistan	1st	Kumite 50 kg
