= Bettina Plank =

Austrian karateka (born 1992)

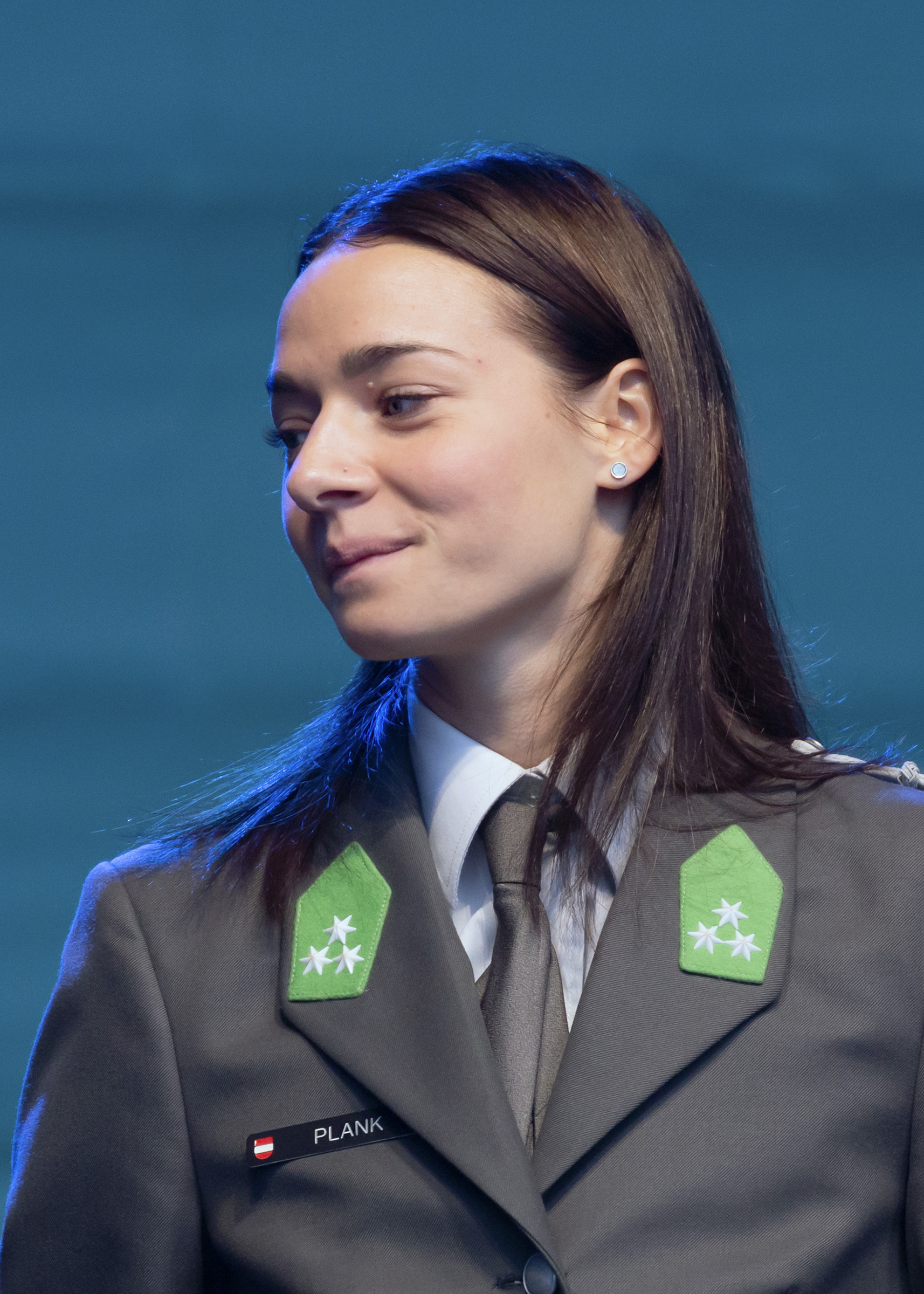
- Plank in 2017

Personal information
- Born: 24 February 1992 (age 34) Feldkirch, Vorarlberg, Austria

Sport
- Country: Austria
- Sport: Karate
- Weight class: 50 kg; 55 kg (Olympic Games)
- Events: Kumite; Team kumite
Medal record
Women's karate
Representing Austria
Summer Olympics
Bronze medal – third place	2020 Tokyo	Kumite 55 kg
World Championships
Bronze medal – third place	2016 Linz	Kumite 50 kg
Bronze medal – third place	2018 Madrid	Kumite 50 kg
European Championships
Gold medal – first place	2015 Istanbul	Kumite 50 kg
Silver medal – second place	2014 Tampere	Kumite 50 kg
Silver medal – second place	2018 Novi Sad	Kumite 50 kg
Silver medal – second place	2019 Guadalajara	Kumite 50 kg
Bronze medal – third place	2017 İzmit	Kumite 50 kg
Bronze medal – third place	2011 Zürich	Kumite 50 kg
Bronze medal – third place	2015 Istanbul	Team kumite
European Games
Gold medal – first place	2019 Minsk	Kumite 50 kg
Gold medal – first place	2023 Kraków-Małopolska	Kumite 50 kg
Silver medal – second place	2015 Baku	Kumite 50 kg

Bettina Plank (born 24 February 1992) is an Austrian karateka. She won one of the bronze medals in the women's 55 kg event at the 2020 Summer Olympics in Tokyo, Japan. She is a two-time bronze medalist in the women's 50 kg event at the World Karate Championships and a three-time medalist, including two gold medals, at the European Games.

Plank also won the gold medal in her event at the 2015 European Karate Championships in Istanbul, Turkey.

== Career ==
Plank won one of the bronze medals in the women's kumite 50 kg event at the 2011 European Karate Championships held in Zürich, Switzerland. In 2014, she won the silver medal in her event at the European Karate Championships held in Tampere, Finland.

In 2015, Plank won the gold medal in the women's kumite 50 kg event at the European Karate Championships held in Istanbul, Turkey. She also won one of the bronze medals in the women's team kumite event. In that same year, Plank won the silver medal in that event at the European Games in Baku, Azerbaijan. In the final, she lost against Serap Özçelik of Turkey. Plank won one of the bronze medals in her event at the 2016 World University Karate Championships held in Braga, Portugal. She also won one of the bronze medals in the women's team kumite event.

In 2017, Plank competed in the women's kumite 50 kg event at the World Games held in Wrocław, Poland without winning a medal. She won one match and lost two matches in the elimination round and she did not advance to compete in the semi-finals. In 2018, Plank won one of the bronze medals in the women's kumite 50 kg event at the World Karate Championships held in Madrid, Spain.

At the 2019 European Games held in Minsk, Belarus, Plank won the gold medal in the women's kumite 50 kg event. She defeated Serap Özçelik of Turkey in her gold medal match.

In June 2021, Plank competed at the World Olympic Qualification Tournament held in Paris, France hoping to qualify for the 2020 Summer Olympics in Tokyo, Japan. She did not qualify at this tournament but she was able to qualify via continental representation soon after. At the Olympics, she won one of the bronze medals in the women's 55 kg event. In November 2021, Plank competed in the women's 50 kg event at the World Karate Championships held in Dubai, United Arab Emirates. In her second match, she lost against Shara Hubrich of Germany and she was then eliminated in the repechage by Kateryna Kryva of Ukraine.

Plank competed in the women's 50 kg event at the 2022 European Karate Championships held in Gaziantep, Turkey. She also competed in the women's team kumite event. In 2023, she won the gold medal in the women's 50 kg event at the European Games held in Poland. She defeated Erminia Perfetto of Italy in her gold medal match. Plank competed in the women's 50 kg event at the 2023 World Karate Championships held in Budapest, Hungary where she was eliminated in her second match.

== Achievements ==
Year	Competition	Venue	Rank	Event
2011	European Championships	Zürich, Switzerland	3rd	Kumite 50 kg
2014	European Championships	Tampere, Finland	2nd	Kumite 50 kg
2015	European Championships	Istanbul, Turkey	1st	Kumite 50 kg
2015	European Championships	Istanbul, Turkey	3rd	Team kumite
2015	European Games	Baku, Azerbaijan	2nd	Kumite 50 kg
2016	World Championships	Linz, Austria	3rd	Kumite 50 kg
2017	European Championships	İzmit, Turkey	3rd	Kumite 50 kg
2018	European Championships	Novi Sad, Serbia	2nd	Kumite 50 kg
2018	World Championships	Madrid, Spain	3rd	Kumite 50 kg
2019	European Championships	Guadalajara, Spain	2nd	Kumite 50 kg
2019	European Games	Minsk, Belarus	1st	Kumite 50 kg
2021	Summer Olympics	Tokyo, Japan	3rd	Kumite 55 kg
2023	European Games	Kraków and Małopolska, Poland	1st	Kumite 50 kg
