= Gülsen Demirtürk =

Turkish karateka (born 2000)

- Born: 6 March 2000 (age 26)
- Nationality: Turkish
- Style: Karate Kumite
- Team: Kocaeli Büyükşehir Belediyesi Kağıt Spor Kulübü

Gülsen Demirtürk (born 6 March 2000) is a Turkish karateka competing in the kumite. She is a member of Kocaeli Büyükşehir Belediyesi Kağıt Spor Kulübü.

== Private life ==
Gülsen Demirtürk was born 6 March 2000.

Demirtürk was motivated for karate by her father, because she was a highly energetic girl in her youth.

She studied at Sakarya University. In the beginning of 2022, she was appointed as a teacher of physical education at a highschool in Dilovası, Kocaeli.

== Sports career ==
Demirtürk took the silver medal in the U21 women's kumite 55 kg category at the WKF Cadet, Junior & U21 World Championship 2019 held in Santiago, Chile.

She won the silver medal in the Team kumite event at the 2021 European Karate Championships held in Poreč, Croatia.
