= Gu Shiau-shuang =

Taiwanese karateka (born 1997)

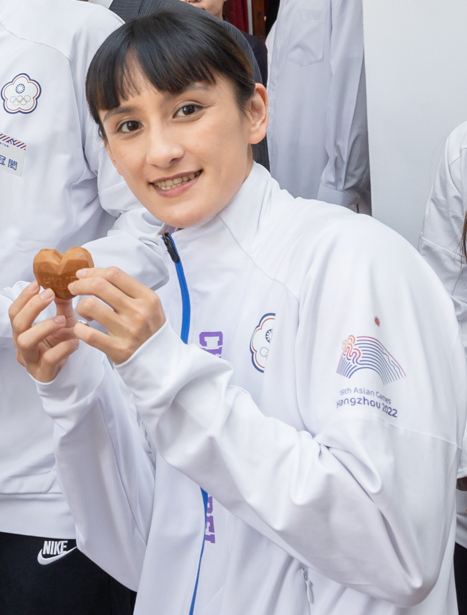

Personal information
- Born: 7 August 1997 (age 28)

Sport
- Country: Taiwan
- Sport: Karate
- Weight class: 50 kg
- Event: Kumite
Medal record
Women's karate
Representing Chinese Taipei
Asian Games
Gold medal – first place	2018 Jakarta	Kumite 50 kg
Gold medal – first place	2022 Hangzhou	Kumite 50 kg
Asian Championships
Gold medal – first place	2022 Tashkent	Kumite 50 kg
Silver medal – second place	2017 Astana	Team kumite
Bronze medal – third place	2018 Amman	Kumite 50 kg
Bronze medal – third place	2019 Tashkent	Kumite 50 kg
Bronze medal – third place	2021 Almaty	Kumite 50 kg

Gu Shiau-shuang (Chinese: 谷筱霜, born 7 August 1997) is a Taiwanese karateka. She is a two-time gold medalist in the women's 50 kg kumite event at the Asian Games. She also won the gold medal in her event at the 2022 Asian Karate Championships.

== Career ==
At the 2017 Asian Karate Championships held in Astana, Kazakhstan, she won the silver medal in the women's team kumite event. In 2018, at the Asian Karate Championships held in Amman, Jordan, she won one of the bronze medals in the women's kumite 50 kg event. She repeated this in 2019 with a bronze medal in the same event.

In 2018, she won the silver medal in the women's kumite 50 kg event at the World University Karate Championships held in Kobe, Japan. She won the gold medal in the women's kumite 50 kg event at the 2018 Asian Games held in Jakarta, Indonesia. In the final, she defeated Bakhriniso Babaeva of Uzbekistan. She won one of the bronze medals in her event at the 2021 Asian Karate Championships held in Almaty, Kazakhstan.

She lost her bronze medal match in the women's 50 kg event at the 2022 World Games held in Birmingham, United States. In 2023, she won the gold medal in the women's 50 kg event at the 2022 Asian Games held in Hangzhou, China. She defeated Moldir Zhangbyrbay of Kazakhstan in her gold medal match.

== Achievements ==
Year	Competition	Venue	Rank	Event
2017	Asian Championships	Astana, Kazakhstan	2nd	Team kumite
2018	Asian Championships	Amman, Jordan	3rd	Kumite 50 kg
2018	World University Karate Championships	Kobe, Japan	2nd	Kumite 50 kg
2018	Asian Games	Jakarta, Indonesia	1st	Kumite 50 kg
2019	Asian Championships	Tashkent, Uzbekistan	3rd	Kumite 50 kg
2021	Asian Championships	Almaty, Kazakhstan	3rd	Kumite 50 kg
2022	Asian Championships	Tashkent, Uzbekistan	1st	Kumite 50 kg
2023	Asian Games	Hangzhou, China	1st	Kumite 50 kg
