= Karate at the 2022 Asian Games – Women's kumite 50 kg =

Women's kumite 50 kg at the 2022 Asian Games
- Venue: Linping Sports Centre Gymnasium
- Date: 8 October 2023
- Competitors: 18 from 18 nations

Medalists
| gold medal | Gu Shiau-shuang | Chinese Taipei |
| silver medal | Moldir Zhangbyrbay | Kazakhstan |
| bronze medal | Hawraa Al-Ajmi | United Arab Emirates |
| bronze medal | Sara Bahmanyar | Iran |

The women's kumite 50 kilograms competition at the 2022 Asian Games took place on 8 October 2023 at Linping Sports Centre Gymnasium, Hangzhou.

== Schedule ==
All times are China Standard Time (UTC+08:00)

| Date | Time | Event |
|---|---|---|
| Sunday, 8 October 2023 | 08:30 | Round of 32 |
| Sunday, 8 October 2023 | 08:30 | Round of 16 |
| Sunday, 8 October 2023 | 08:30 | Quarterfinals |
| Sunday, 8 October 2023 | 08:30 | Semifinals |
| Sunday, 8 October 2023 | 08:30 | Repechages |
| Sunday, 8 October 2023 | 08:30 | Finals |

== Results ==
=== Main bracket ===
==== Final ====
| Gold medal contest |
| Gu Shiau-shuang (TPE) | 5 |
| Moldir Zhangbyrbay (KAZ) | 5 |

==== Top half ====
Round of 32
Li Ranran (CHN) | 3
Sabina Shrestha (NEP) | 1

Round of 16
Fong Man Wai (MAC) | 4
Li Ranran (CHN) | 3
Shakhrizoda Ismatillaeva (UZB) | 3
Umida Aisaeva (KGZ) | 1
Hawraa Al-Ajmi (UAE) | 6
Gu Shiau-shuang (TPE) | 6
Chanyanut Chippensuk (THA) | 7
Jung Ji-young (KOR) | 0

Quarterfinals
Fong Man Wai (MAC) | 0
Shakhrizoda Ismatillaeva (UZB) | 8
Gu Shiau-shuang (TPE) | 11
Chanyanut Chippensuk (THA) | 3

Semifinals
Shakhrizoda Ismatillaeva (UZB) | 2
Gu Shiau-shuang (TPE) | 8

==== Bottom half ====
Round of 32
Saiama Jaman (BAN) | 2
Shahmalarani Chandran (MAS) | 3

Round of 16
Sara Bahmanyar (IRI) | 7
Shahmalarani Chandran (MAS) | 3
Chonn Srey Phea (CAM) | 3
Junna Tsukii (PHI) | 2
Miho Miyahara (JPN) | 9
Dalal Al-Saied (KUW) | 0
Moldir Zhangbyrbay (KAZ) | 3
Tsang Yee Ting (HKG) | 2

Quarterfinals
Sara Bahmanyar (IRI) | 8
Chonn Srey Phea (CAM) | 0
Miho Miyahara (JPN) | 5
Moldir Zhangbyrbay (KAZ) | 6

Semifinals
Sara Bahmanyar (IRI) | 4
Moldir Zhangbyrbay (KAZ) | 5

=== Repechage ===
Repechage round 2
Hawraa Al-Ajmi (UAE) | 11
Chanyanut Chippensuk (THA) | 5
Tsang Yee Ting (HKG) | 6
Miho Miyahara (JPN) | 12

Bronze medal bouts
Hawraa Al-Ajmi (UAE) | 5
Shakhrizoda Ismatillaeva (UZB) | 1
Miho Miyahara (JPN) | 5
Sara Bahmanyar (IRI) | 6
