= 2026 European Karate Championships =

Karate tournament

- Venue: Eissporthalle Frankfurt
- Location: Frankfurt, Germany
- Dates: 20–24 May
- Competitors: 586 from 50 nations

The 2026 European Karate Championships was the 61st edition of the European Karate Championships and was held in Frankfurt, Germany from 20 to 24 May 2026. Russian and Belarusian karate athletes participated in the tournament as part of the European Karate Federation.

== Medal table ==
* Host nation (Germany)

Rank	Nation	Gold	Silver	Bronze	Total
1	Italy	7	1	1	9
2	Turkey	2	4	0	6
3	Croatia	2	1	3	6
4	European Karate Federation–1	2	0	3	5
5	Greece	1	1	1	3
6	Azerbaijan	1	0	2	3
6	Germany*	1	0	2	3
8	France	0	5	2	7
9	Spain	0	1	3	4
10	Portugal	0	1	2	3
11	Bulgaria	0	1	0	1
11	Serbia	0	1	0	1
13	Bosnia and Herzegovina	0	0	2	2
13	Georgia	0	0	2	2
13	Montenegro	0	0	2	2
13	Slovakia	0	0	2	2
13	Ukraine	0	0	2	2
18	Belgium	0	0	1	1
18	Romania	0	0	1	1
18	Slovenia	0	0	1	1
Totals (20 entries)		16	16	32	64

== Medalists ==
=== Men ===
Event	Gold	Silver	Bronze
Individual kata	Enes Özdemir; Turkey	Alessio Ghinami; Italy	Roman Hrčka; Slovakia
Individual kata	Enes Özdemir; Turkey	Alessio Ghinami; Italy	Raúl Martín; Spain
Team kata	Italy; Mattia Busato; Gianluca Gallo; Alessio Ghinami; Alessandro Iodice	Turkey; Kutluhan Duran; Furkan Kaynar; Ozan Parlak; Muhammed Efe Yurtseven	Portugal; Vasco Mateus; Artur Neto; Martim Oliveira; João Vieira
Team kata	Italy; Mattia Busato; Gianluca Gallo; Alessio Ghinami; Alessandro Iodice	Turkey; Kutluhan Duran; Furkan Kaynar; Ozan Parlak; Muhammed Efe Yurtseven	Spain; Alejandro Galán; Antonio Lozano; Iván Martín; Raúl Martín
Kumite −60 kg	Christos-Stefanos Xenos; Greece	Aleksandar Vučković; Serbia	Balša Vojinović; Montenegro
Kumite −60 kg	Christos-Stefanos Xenos; Greece	Aleksandar Vučković; Serbia	Tsotne Sordia; Georgia
Kumite −67 kg	Luca Maresca; Italy	Younesse Salmi; France	Georgios Baliotis; Greece
Kumite −67 kg	Luca Maresca; Italy	Younesse Salmi; France	Iurik Ogannisian; European Karate Federation–1
Kumite −75 kg	Ömer Faruk Yürür; Turkey	Kilian Cizo; France	Andrii Zaplitnyi; Ukraine
Kumite −75 kg	Ömer Faruk Yürür; Turkey	Kilian Cizo; France	Ernest Sharafutdinov; European Karate Federation–1
Kumite −84 kg	Eduard Gasparian; European Karate Federation–1	Konstantinos Mastroyannis; Greece	Nemanja Mikulić; Montenegro
Kumite −84 kg	Eduard Gasparian; European Karate Federation–1	Konstantinos Mastroyannis; Greece	Ivan Kvesić; Croatia
Kumite +84 kg	Matteo Avanzini; Italy	Uğur Aktaş; Turkey	Anđelo Kvesić; Croatia
Kumite +84 kg	Matteo Avanzini; Italy	Uğur Aktaş; Turkey	Hendrick Confiac; France
Team kumite	Italy; Matteo Avanzini; Michele Ciani; Daniele De Vivo; Matteo Fiore; Luca Maresca; Michele Martina; Lorenzo Pietromarchi; Christian Sabatino	Turkey; Eren Akkurt; Uğur Aktaş; Hasan Arslan; Enes Bulut; Kadir Furkan Genç; Umut Eren Gündoğ; Yusuf Eren Temizel; Ömer Faruk Yürür	Georgia; Davit Davituri; Anzor Donadze; Merabi Gelashvili; Valiko Poniava; Tsotne Sordia; Ika Sulamanidze; Nika Tolordava
Team kumite	Italy; Matteo Avanzini; Michele Ciani; Daniele De Vivo; Matteo Fiore; Luca Maresca; Michele Martina; Lorenzo Pietromarchi; Christian Sabatino	Turkey; Eren Akkurt; Uğur Aktaş; Hasan Arslan; Enes Bulut; Kadir Furkan Genç; Umut Eren Gündoğ; Yusuf Eren Temizel; Ömer Faruk Yürür	European Karate Federation–1; Gadzhi Gadzhiev; Eduard Gasparian; Makar Golovin; Konstantin Kokovurov; Iurik Ogannisian; Ernest Sharafutdinov

=== Women ===
Event	Gold	Silver	Bronze
Individual kata	Terryana D'Onofrio; Italy	Paola García; Spain	Chiara Manca; Belgium
Individual kata	Terryana D'Onofrio; Italy	Paola García; Spain	Ana Sofia Cruz; Portugal
Team kata	Italy; Carola Casale; Orsola D'Onofrio; Michela Rizzo; Elena Roversi	Portugal; Ana Sofia Cruz; Natacha Fernandes; Inês Oliveira; Beatriz Portal	Spain; Abril Angulo; Paola García; Carla Guardeño; Irene Yao
Team kata	Italy; Carola Casale; Orsola D'Onofrio; Michela Rizzo; Elena Roversi	Portugal; Ana Sofia Cruz; Natacha Fernandes; Inês Oliveira; Beatriz Portal	France; Maï-Linh Bui; Louise Capet; Léa Severan; Julia Vilanova
Kumite −50 kg	Ema Sgardelli; Croatia	Teodora Tsaneva; Bulgaria	Erminia Perfetto; Italy
Kumite −50 kg	Ema Sgardelli; Croatia	Teodora Tsaneva; Bulgaria	Patricia Nastas; Romania
Kumite −55 kg	Madina Sadigova; Azerbaijan	Zümra Rezzan İm; Turkey	Nejra Sipović; Bosnia and Herzegovina
Kumite −55 kg	Madina Sadigova; Azerbaijan	Zümra Rezzan İm; Turkey	Mia Bitsch; Germany
Kumite −61 kg	Altana Basangova; European Karate Federation–1	Mia Greta Zorko; Croatia	Ingrida Bakoš Suchánková; Slovakia
Kumite −61 kg	Altana Basangova; European Karate Federation–1	Mia Greta Zorko; Croatia	Emina Sipović; Bosnia and Herzegovina
Kumite −68 kg	Sadea Bećirović; Croatia	Thalya Sombé; France	Irina Zaretska; Azerbaijan
Kumite −68 kg	Sadea Bećirović; Croatia	Thalya Sombé; France	Elina Sieliemienieva; Ukraine
Kumite +68 kg	Clio Ferracuti; Italy	Clémence Péa; France	Zala Žibret; Slovenia
Kumite +68 kg	Clio Ferracuti; Italy	Clémence Péa; France	Johanna Kneer; Germany
Team kumite	Germany; Mia Bitsch; Shara Hubrich; Johanna Kneer; Hannah Riedel; Madeleine Schröter	France; Monica Arzumian; Zera Jade Ozserttas; Chloé Payrot; Clémence Péa; Thalya Sombé	Croatia; Sadea Bećirović; Nikolina Golomboš; Ema Sgardelli; Sara Tomić; Mia Greta Zorko
Team kumite	Germany; Mia Bitsch; Shara Hubrich; Johanna Kneer; Hannah Riedel; Madeleine Schröter	France; Monica Arzumian; Zera Jade Ozserttas; Chloé Payrot; Clémence Péa; Thalya Sombé	Azerbaijan; Aysu Aliyeva; Fatima Mammadova; Gulay Orujova; Madina Sadigova; Irina Zaretska

== Participating nations ==
586 athletes from 50 countries participated:

- Albania (6)
- Andorra (1)
- Armenia (7)
- Austria (7)
- Azerbaijan (18)
- Belgium (5)
- Bosnia and Herzegovina (19)
- Bulgaria (5)
- Croatia (26)
- Cyprus (10)
- Czech Republic (8)
- Denmark (10)
- England (14)
- European Karate Federation–1 (Russia) (21)
- European Karate Federation–2 (Belarus) (11)
- Estonia (2)
- Finland (6)
- France (25)
- Georgia (10)
- Germany (23)
- Greece (15)
- Hungary (13)
- Ireland (9)
- Iceland (4)
- Israel (3)
- Italy (24)
- Kosovo (16)
- Latvia (7)
- Liechtenstein (1)
- Lithuania (6)
- Luxembourg (7)
- Malta (3)
- Moldova (2)
- Montenegro (23)
- Netherlands (15)
- North Macedonia (15)
- Norway (3)
- Poland (14)
- Portugal (15)
- Refugee Karate Team (1)
- Romania (12)
- Scotland (9)
- Serbia (18)
- Slovakia (14)
- Slovenia (7)
- Spain (23)
- Sweden (7)
- Switzerland (19)
- Turkey (28)
- Ukraine (19)

== Para Karate ==
=== Medalists ===
Event	Gold	Silver	Bronze
Men's K-10	Nohan Dudon; France	Dorin Alexe; Romania	Josip Steko; Croatia
Men's K-10	Nohan Dudon; France	Dorin Alexe; Romania	Farrukh Gaybaliyev; Azerbaijan
Men's K-21	Mike Richter; Germany	Carlos Huertas; Spain	António Pereira; Portugal
Men's K-21	Mike Richter; Germany	Carlos Huertas; Spain	Albert Singer; Germany
Men's K-22	Mattia Allesina; Italy	Patrick Buwalda; Italy	Stipe Barić; Croatia
Men's K-22	Mattia Allesina; Italy	Patrick Buwalda; Italy	Daniele Alfonsi; Italy
Men's K-30	Berkay Uslu; Turkey	Ahmet Kayra Ödemiş; Turkey	Vidadi Khaligov; Azerbaijan
Men's K-30	Berkay Uslu; Turkey	Ahmet Kayra Ödemiş; Turkey	Pietro Merlo; Italy
Women's K-10	Veronika Kamenská; Czech Republic	Suna Saraçoğlu; Turkey	Aysel Ahmadli; Azerbaijan
Women's K-10	Veronika Kamenská; Czech Republic	Suna Saraçoğlu; Turkey	An Mei van Tongeren; Netherlands
Women's K-21	Federica Yakymashko; Italy	Olívia Kákosy; Hungary	Lucía Sánchez; Spain
Women's K-21	Federica Yakymashko; Italy	Olívia Kákosy; Hungary	Cristina Alepuz; Spain
Women's K-22	Daniela Topić; Croatia	Lucia Vlková; Slovakia	Zina Szőke; Hungary
Women's K-22	Daniela Topić; Croatia	Lucia Vlková; Slovakia	Lara Hemmann; Germany
Women's K-30	Anna Thorwirth; Germany	Helen Morrissey-Marsh; England	Veronika Kalinina; European Karate Federation–1
Women's K-30	Anna Thorwirth; Germany	Helen Morrissey-Marsh; England	Virginie Boyer; France

=== Medal table ===
* Host nation (Germany)

Rank	Nation	Gold	Silver	Bronze	Total
1	Italy	2	1	2	5
2	Germany*	2	0	2	4
3	Turkey	1	2	0	3
4	Croatia	1	0	2	3
5	France	1	0	1	2
6	Czech Republic	1	0	0	1
7	Spain	0	1	2	3
8	Hungary	0	1	1	2
9	England	0	1	0	1
9	Romania	0	1	0	1
9	Slovakia	0	1	0	1
12	Azerbaijan	0	0	3	3
13	European Karate Federation–1	0	0	1	1
13	Netherlands	0	0	1	1
13	Portugal	0	0	1	1
Totals (15 entries)		8	8	16	32
