= Erminia Perfetto =

Italian karateka (born 1995)

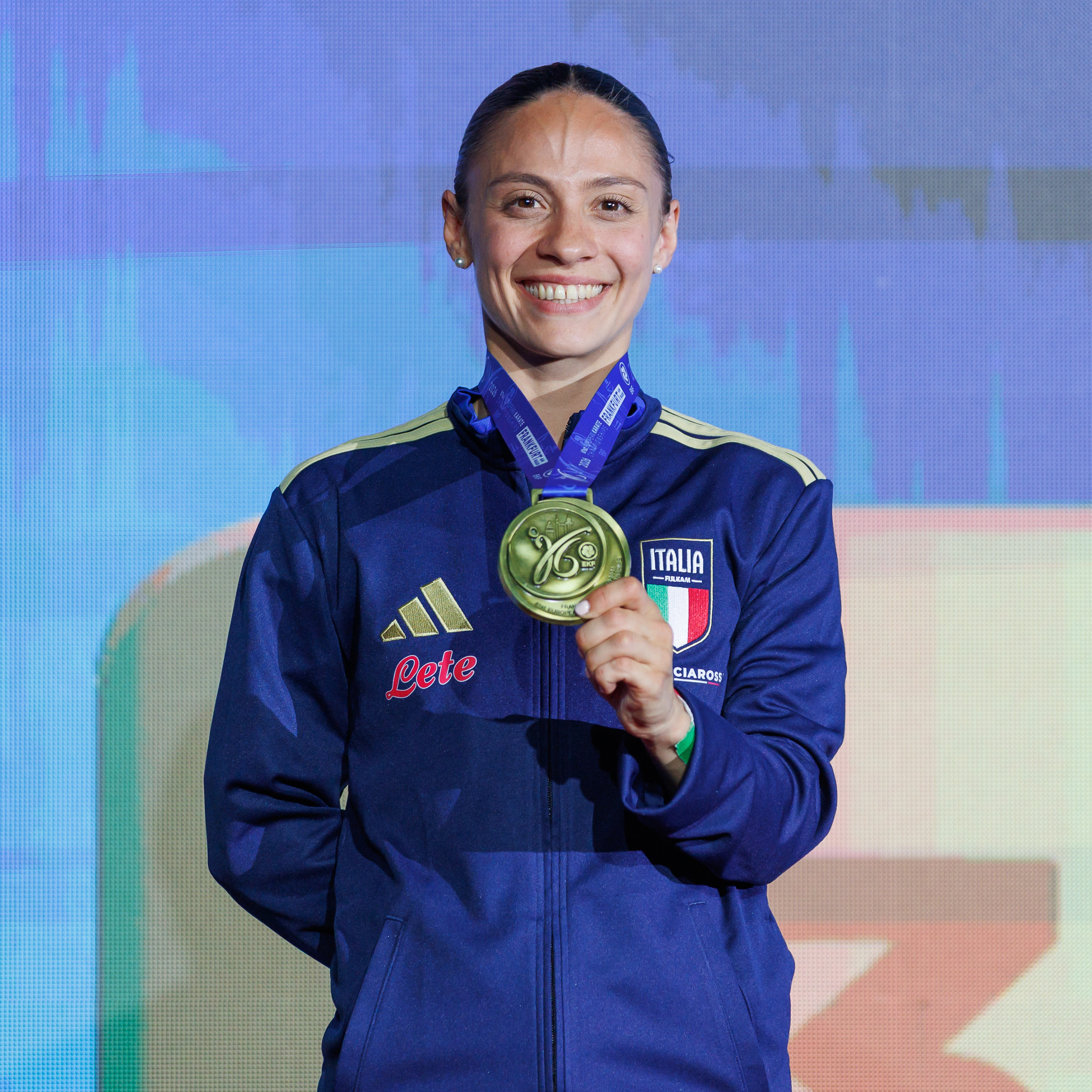

Personal information
- Born: 9 June 1995 (age 31)

Sport
- Country: Italy
- Sport: Karate
- Weight class: 50 kg
- Event: Kumite
Medal record
Women's karate
Representing Italy
World Championships
Silver medal – second place	2023 Budapest	Kumite 50 kg
European Games
Silver medal – second place	2023 Kraków-Małopolska	Kumite 50 kg
European Championships
Silver medal – second place	2022 Gaziantep	Kumite 50 kg
Silver medal – second place	2025 Yerevan	Kumite 50 kg
Bronze medal – third place	2023 Guadalajara	Kumite 50 kg
Bronze medal – third place	2024 Zadar	Kumite 50 kg
Bronze medal – third place	2026 Frankfurt	Kumite 50 kg
Mediterranean Games
Silver medal – second place	2026 Taranto	Kumite 50 kg

Erminia Perfetto (born 9 June 1995) is an Italian karateka. She won the silver medal in the women's 50 kg event at the 2023 European Games held in Poland. She is also a five-time medalist in her event at the European Karate Championships.

== Career ==
In 2021, Perfetto competed in the women's 50 kg event at the World Karate Championships held in Dubai, United Arab Emirates. She was eliminated in her fourth match by Chaimae El Hayti of Morocco. In 2022, Perfetto competed in the women's 50 kg event at the Mediterranean Games held in Oran, Algeria where she was eliminated in her first match.

Perfetto won the silver medal in the women's 50 kg event at the 2023 World Karate Championships held in Budapest, Hungary. In the final, she lost against Moldir Zhangbyrbay of Kazakhstan.

She won one of the bronze medals in the women's 50 kg event at the 2024 European Karate Championships held in Zadar, Croatia. She won the silver medal in the women's 50 kg event at the 2025 European Karate Championships held in Yerevan, Armenia.

== Achievements ==
Year	Competition	Location	Rank	Event
2022	European Championships	Gaziantep, Turkey	2nd	Kumite 50 kg
2023	European Championships	Guadalajara, Spain	3rd	Kumite 50 kg
2023	European Games	Kraków and Małopolska, Poland	2nd	Kumite 50 kg
2023	World Championships	Budapest, Hungary	2nd	Kumite 50 kg
2024	European Championships	Zadar, Croatia	3rd	Kumite 50 kg
2025	European Championships	Yerevan, Armenia	2nd	Kumite 50 kg
2026	European Championships	Frankfurt, Germany	3rd	Kumite 50 kg
2026	Mediterranean Games	Taranto, Italy	2nd	Kumite 50 kg
