= Shara Hubrich =

German karateka (born 1997)

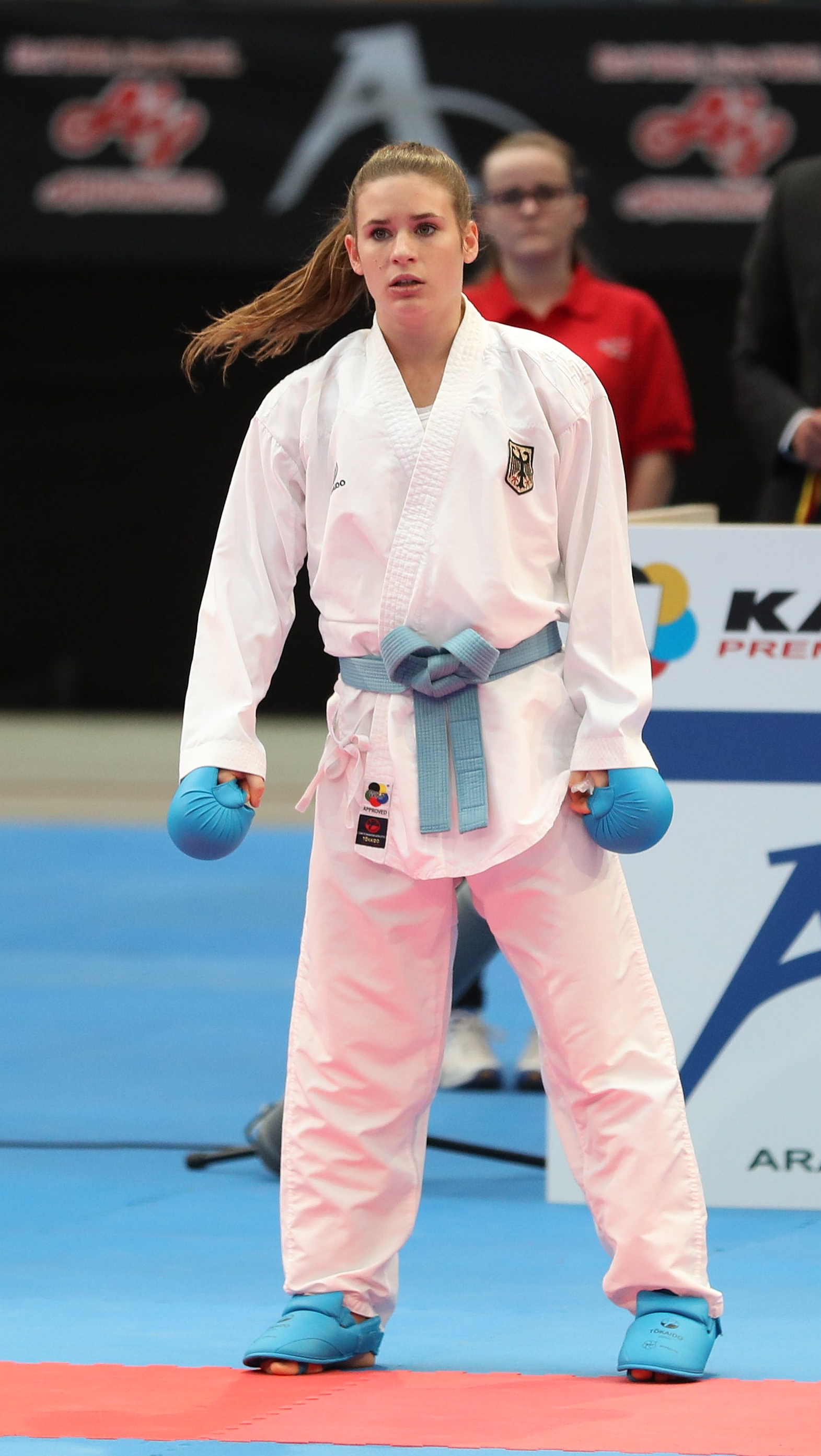
- Hubrich in 2018

Personal information
- Born: 15 September 1997 (age 29)

Sport
- Country: Germany
- Sport: Karate
- Weight class: 50 kg
- Events: Kumite; Team kumite
Medal record
Women's karate
Representing Germany
World Championships
Silver medal – second place	2021 Dubai	Kumite 50 kg
European Championships
Gold medal – first place	2021 Poreč	Team kumite
Gold medal – first place	2023 Guadalajara	Kumite 50 kg
Gold medal – first place	2024 Zadar	Team kumite
Gold medal – first place	2025 Yerevan	Team kumite
Gold medal – first place	2026 Frankfurt	Team kumite
Silver medal – second place	2021 Poreč	Kumite 50 kg
Bronze medal – third place	2019 Guadalajara	Team kumite
Bronze medal – third place	2025 Yerevan	Kumite 50 kg

Shara Hubrich (born 15 September 1997) is a German karateka. She won the silver medal in the women's 50 kg event at the 2021 World Karate Championships held in Dubai, United Arab Emirates. She won the gold medal in the women's 50 kg event at the 2023 European Karate Championships held in Guadalajara, Spain.

== Career ==
Hubrich competed in the women's 50 kg event at the 2018 World Karate Championships held in Madrid, Spain. She won one of the bronze medals in the women's team kumite event at the 2019 European Karate Championships in Guadalajara, Spain. A month later, Hubrich competed in the women's kumite 50 kg event at the 2019 European Games held in Minsk, Belarus.

In 2021, Hubrich won the silver medal in the women's 50 kg event at the European Karate Championships held in Poreč, Croatia. She also won the gold medal in the women's team kumite event.

Hubrich competed in the women's 50 kg event at the 2022 European Karate Championships held in Gaziantep, Turkey. She competed in the women's 50 kg at the 2022 World Games held in Birmingham, United States.

Hubrich won the gold medal in the women's 50 kg event at the 2023 European Karate Championships held in Guadalajara, Spain. A few months later, she competed in the women's 50 kg event at the European Games held in Poland. She also competed in the women's 50 kg event at the 2023 World Karate Championships held in Budapest, Hungary.

She won the gold medal in the women's team kumite event at the 2024 European Karate Championships held in Zadar, Croatia.

== Achievements ==
Year	Competition	Venue	Rank	Event
2019	European Championships	Guadalajara, Spain	3rd	Team kumite
2021	European Championships	Poreč, Croatia	2nd	Kumite 50 kg
2021	European Championships	Poreč, Croatia	1st	Team kumite
2021	World Championships	Dubai, United Arab Emirates	2nd	Kumite 50 kg
2023	European Championships	Guadalajara, Spain	1st	Kumite 50 kg
2024	European Championships	Zadar, Croatia	1st	Team kumite
2025	European Championships	Yerevan, Armenia	3rd	Kumite 50 kg
2025	European Championships	Yerevan, Armenia	1st	Team kumite
2026	European Championships	Frankfurt, Germany	1st	Team kumite
