= Moldir Zhangbyrbay =

Kazakhstani karateka (born 1997)

Möldır Jañbyrbai
Personal information
- Native name: Мөлдір Жаңбырбай
- Born: 18 May 1997 (age 29) Kyzylorda, Kazakhstan

Sport
- Country: Kazakhstan
- Sport: Karate
- Weight class: 55 kg
- Events: Kumite; Team kumite
- Team: Kazakhstan
Medal record
Women's karate
Representing Kazakhstan
World Games
Silver medal – second place	2025 Chengdu	Kumite 50 kg
World Championships
Gold medal – first place	2023 Budapest	Kumite 50 kg
Asian Games
Silver medal – second place	2022 Hangzhou	Kumite 50 kg
Asian Championships
Gold medal – first place	2021 Almaty	Kumite 50 kg
Silver medal – second place	2023 Malacca	Kumite 50 kg
Bronze medal – third place	2021 Almaty	Team kumite
Bronze medal – third place	2025 Tashkent	Kumite 50 kg

Möldır Berıkqyzy Jañbyrbai (Note: Often transliterated as Moldir Berikkyzy Zhangbyrbay through a Russified Romanization of Молдир Бериккызы Жанбырбай.) (Kazakh: Мөлдір Берікқызы Жаңбырбай, born 18 May 1997) is a Kazakh professional karateka, she currently represents Kazakhstan internationally Kumite (Karate) event.

== Career ==
- She is three time gold medalist in Asian Karate Championships (Continental Championship) in individual Kumite U-50 kg Category in the year of 2018 in Japan and 2017 in Kazakhstan and she also won several medals in the World Karate Federation Karate 1 Leagues and Series Championships. She also won the gold medal in her event at the 2021 Asian Karate Championships held in Almaty, Kazakhstan.
- In 2018 Asian Games was eliminated in her second match (quarterfinal) by Paweena Raksachart of Thailand in the Individual Women's Kumite 50 kg.
- In 2023, she won the silver medal in the women's 50 kg event at the 2022 Asian Games held in Hangzhou, China. She won the gold medal in the women's 50 kg event at the 2023 World Karate Championships held in Budapest, Hungary. She defeated Erminia Perfetto of Italy in the final.

== Achievements ==
She has qualified at the World Olympic Qualification Tournament in Paris, France to represent Kazakhstan in Women's -55 kg Kumite Category at the Karate competition of the 2020 Summer Olympics in Tokyo, Japan.

Competition Records
YEAR	COMPETITION	VENUE	RANK/POSITION	EVENT
2021	Karate 1 Premier League	Lisbon Portugal	Silver	Female -50 kg Kumite
2020	Karate 1 Premier League	Salzburg Austria	Participate	Female -50 kg Kumite
2020	Karate 1 Premier League	Dubai United Arab Emirates	Participate	Female -50 kg Kumite
2020	Karate 1 Premier League	Paris France	Participate	Female -50 kg Kumite
2019	Karate 1 Premier League	Madrid Spain	Participate	Female -50 kg Kumite
2019	Karate 1 Premier League	Moscow ROC	Participate	Female -50 kg Kumite
2019	Karate 1 Series A	Santiago Chile	Participate	Female -50 kg Kumite
2019	Karate 1 Premier League	Tokyo ROC	9th	Female -50 kg Kumite
2019	16th Senior Asian Karate Championship	Tashkent Uzbekistan	5th	Female -50 kg Kumite
2019	Karate 1 Series A	Montreal Canada	Participate	Female -50 kg Kumite
2019	Karate 1 Premier League	Shanghai China	Participate	Female -50 kg Kumite
2019	Karate 1 Series A	Istanbul Turkey	Participate	Female -50 kg Kumite
2019	Karate 1 Premier League	Rabat Morocco	Participate	Female -50 kg Kumite
2019	Karate 1 Series A	Salzburg Austria	Participate	Female -50 kg Kumite
2019	Karate 1 Premier League	Dubai United Arab Emirates	Participate	Female -50 kg Kumite
2019	Karate 1 Premier League	Paris France	Participate	Female -50 kg Kumite
2019	Karate 1 Series A	Shanghai China	5th	Female -50 kg Kumite
2018	Senior World Karate Championship	Madrid Spain	9th	Female -50 kg Kumite
2018	Karate 1 Premier League	Tokyo Japan	Participate	Female -50 kg Kumite
2018	Karate 1 Premier League	Berlin Germany	7th	Female -50 kg Kumite
2018	Karate 1 Premier League	Istanbul Turkey	Participate	Female -50 kg Kumite
2018	17th Cadet, Junior and Under21 Asian Karate Championship	Okinawa Japan	Gold	U-21 Kumite Female -50 kg
2018	Karate 1 Premier League	Rabat Morocco	Participate	Female -50 kg Kumite
2018	Karate 1 Premier League	Rotterdam Netherlands	7th	Female -50 kg Kumite
2018	Karate 1 Series A	Guadalajara Spain	9th	Female -50 kg Kumite
2018	Karate 1 Premier League	Paris France	9th	Female -50 kg Kumite
2017	Karate 1 Series A	Okinawa Japan	Bronze	Female -50 kg Kumite
2017	10th World Junior, Cadet & Under 21 Karate Championships	Tenerife Spain	Participate	U21 Kumite Female -50 kg
2017	Karate 1 Premier League	Halle/Leipzig Germany	Participate	Female -50 kg Kumite
2017	16th Asian Cadet, Junior & Under 21 Karate Championships	Astana Kazakhstan	Gold	U21 Kumite Female -50 kg
2017	Karate 1 Series A	Toledo Spain	5th	Female -50 kg Kumite
2017	Karate 1 Premier League	Rotterdam Netherlands	Participate	Female -50 kg Kumite
2017	Karate 1 Premier League	Paris France	Participate	Female -50 kg Kumite
2015	9th World Junior, Cadet & Under 21 Karate Championships	Jakarta Indonesia	Participate	U21 Kumite Female -50 kg
2013	8th World Junior, Cadet & Under 21 Karate Championships	Guadalajara Spain	Participate	Junior Kumite Female -48 kg
