= 2024 European Karate Championships – Women's 55 kg =

European Karate Championship

Women's 55 kg at the 2024 European Karate Championships
- Venue: Krešimir Ćosić Hall
- Location: Zadar, Croatia
- Dates: 10–11 May
- Nations: 31
- Teams: 31

Medalists
gold medal	Mia Bitsch	Germany
silver medal	Sonia Pereira	Spain
bronze medal	Maria Stoli	Greece
bronze medal	Tuba Yakan	Turkey

The women's 55 kg competition at the 2024 European Karate Championships was held from 10 to 11 May 2024.

== Results ==
=== Final ===
Final
Mia Bitsch (GER)	4
Sonia Pereira (ESP)	2

=== Top half ===
Round of 32
Anila Foniqi (KOS)	1
Robin Vincent (ENG)	5
Bianca Iorga (ROU)	5
Maya Schärer (SUI)	4
Marija Muižniece (LAT)	1
Ivana Kamenova (BUL)	1
Kseniya Dronchanka (POL)	2
Tuba Yakan (TUR)	4
Jennifer Warling (LUX)	6
Tylla Levacher (FRA)	5
Laura Bergant (SLO)	5
Joana Lopes (POR)	1
Veronica Brunori (ITA)	9
Jovana Strujić (MNE)	0
Matilda Rosenlind (SWE)	0
Mia Bitsch (GER)	0

Round of 16
Robin Vincent (ENG)	4
Bianca Iorga (ROU)	1
Ivana Kamenova (BUL)	0
Tuba Yakan (TUR)	0
Jennifer Warling (LUX)	2
Laura Bergant (SLO)	0
Veronica Brunori (ITA)	1
Mia Bitsch (GER)	5

Quarterfinals
Robin Vincent (ENG)	0
Tuba Yakan (TUR)	9
Jennifer Warling (LUX)	5
Mia Bitsch (GER)	6

Semifinals
Tuba Yakan (TUR)	3
Mia Bitsch (GER)	4

=== Bottom half ===
Round of 32
Elena Berezovscaia (MDA)	0
Simona Zaborska (MKD)	3
Aleksandra Djikic (SRB)	3
Amy Connell (SCO)	2
Dorotea Rumenjak (CRO)	3
Madina Sadigova (AZE)	5
Rebecca Gaidella (SMR)	0
Maria Stoli (GRE)	7
Nicoline Olsen (DEN)	1
Nina Kvasnicová (SVK)	8
Athena Kokkinidou (CYP)	3
Aicha Boussebaa (HUN)	2
Sonia Pereira (ESP)	3
Nejra Sipović (BIH)	1

Round of 16
Simona Zaborska (MKD)	0
Aleksandra Djikic (SRB)	4
Madina Sadigova (AZE)	0
Maria Stoli (GRE)	1
Nina Kvasnicová (SVK)	3
Athena Kokkinidou (CYP)	2
Sonia Pereira (ESP)	2
Anzhelika Terliuga (UKR)	2

Quarterfinals
Aleksandra Djikic (SRB)	2
Maria Stoli (GRE)	6
Nina Kvasnicová (SVK)	2
Sonia Pereira (ESP)	3

Semifinals
Maria Stoli (GRE)	3
Sonia Pereira (ESP)	5

=== Repechage ===
Repechage round 1
Matilda Rosenlind (SWE)	4
Veronica Brunori (ITA)	6
Nejra Sipović (BIH)	1
Anzhelika Terliuga (UKR)	9

Repechage round 2
Jennifer Warling (LUX)	5
Veronica Brunori (ITA)	9
Nina Kvasnicová (SVK)	0
Anzhelika Terliuga (UKR)	7

Bronze medals
Tuba Yakan (TUR)	3
Veronica Brunori (ITA)	1
Maria Stoli (GRE)	3
Anzhelika Terliuga (UKR)	2
