= 2025 European Karate Championships – Women's 55 kg =

European Karate Championship

Women's 55 kg at the 2025 European Karate Championships
- Venue: Karen Demirchyan Sports and Concerts Complex
- Location: Yerevan, Armenia
- Dates: 8, 10 May
- Competitors: 31 from 31 nations

Medalists
| gold medal | Mia Bitsch | Germany |
| silver medal | Jennifer Warling | Luxembourg |
| bronze medal | Ivet Goranova | Bulgaria |
| bronze medal | Anna Chernysheva |

The Women's 55 kg competition at the 2025 European Karate Championships was held on 8 and 10 May 2025.

== Results ==
=== Finals ===
Semifinals
(Bulgaria) Ivet Goranova | 8
(Germany) Mia Bitsch | 11
(Georgia (country)) Lizi Zviadauri | 4
(Luxembourg) Jennifer Warling | 9

Final
(Germany) Mia Bitsch | 4
(Luxembourg) Jennifer Warling | 1

=== Repechage ===
Repechage 1
(Kosovo) Anila Foniqi | 0
(Scotland) Amy Connell | 3

Repechage 2
(Scotland) Amy Connell | 0
(Slovakia) Nina Kvasnicová | 8

Bronze medal
(Slovakia) Nina Kvasnicová | 3
(Bulgaria) Ivet Goranova | 4

Repechage 1
(Denmark) Nicoline Olsen | 3
(Ukraine) Anzhelika Terliuga | 4

Repechage 2
(Ukraine) Anzhelika Terliuga | 0
Anna Chernysheva | 7

Bronze medal
Anna Chernysheva | 7
(Georgia (country)) Lizi Zviadauri | 0

=== Top half ===
==== Section 1 ====
Round of 32
(Romania) Lorelley Andrei | 2
(Switzerland) Maya Schärer | 10
(Lithuania) Miglė Liutkevičiūtė | 3
(North Macedonia) Simona Zaborska | 2
(Montenegro) Helena Backović | 0
(Greece) Maria Stoli | 2
(Italy) Viola Lallo | 3
(Bulgaria) Ivet Goranova | 7

Round of 16
(Switzerland) Maya Schärer | 6
(Lithuania) Miglė Liutkevičiūtė | 8
(Greece) Maria Stoli | 1
(Bulgaria) Ivet Goranova | 2

Quarterfinals
(Lithuania) Miglė Liutkevičiūtė | 0
(Bulgaria) Ivet Goranova | 8

==== Section 2 ====
Round of 32
(Norway) Alva Alexandra Sjursen | 0
(Slovakia) Nina Kvasnicová | 4
(Croatia) Jelena Pehar | 3
(Latvia) Marija Luīze Muižniece | 5
(Hungary) Bianka Szodorai | 2
(Scotland) Amy Connell | 5
(Kosovo) Anila Foniqi | 0
(Germany) Mia Bitsch | 5

Round of 16
(Slovakia) Nina Kvasnicová | 1
(Latvia) Marija Luīze Muižniece | 0
(Scotland) Amy Connell | 0
(Germany) Mia Bitsch | 3

Quarterfinals
(Slovakia) Nina Kvasnicová | 0
(Germany) Mia Bitsch | 1

=== Bottom half ===
==== Section 3 ====
Round of 32
(Sweden) Matilda Rosenlind | 0
(France) Sylia Abdesselem | 6
(Poland) Kseniya Dronchanka | 6
(Cyprus) Maria Kyprianou | 0
(Israel) Rotem Efroni | 1
(Georgia (country)) Lizi Zviadauri | 4
(Spain) Sonia Pereira | 1
(Turkey) Tuba Yakan | 3

Round of 16
(France) Sylia Abdesselem | 3
(Poland) Kseniya Dronchanka | 3
(Georgia (country)) Lizi Zviadauri | 0
(Turkey) Tuba Yakan | 1

Quarterfinals
(Poland) Kseniya Dronchanka | 0
(Georgia (country)) Lizi Zviadauri | 0

==== Section 4 ====
Round of 32
(Bosnia and Herzegovina) Nejra Sipović | 2
(Moldova) Elena Berezovscaia | 1
Anna Chernysheva | 4
(Armenia) Alisa Khojayan | 2
(Luxembourg) Jennifer Warling | 2
(Denmark) Nicoline Olsen | 0

Round of 16
(Bosnia and Herzegovina) Nejra Sipović | 0
Anna Chernysheva | 1
(Luxembourg) Jennifer Warling | 11
(Ukraine) Anzhelika Terliuga | 3

Quarterfinals
Anna Chernysheva | 4
(Luxembourg) Jennifer Warling | 6
