= 2023 World Karate Championships – Women's 55 kg =

Women's kumite 55 kg at the 2023 World Karate Championships
- Venue: László Papp Budapest Sports Arena
- Location: Budapest, Hungary
- Dates: 25, 28 October
- Competitors: 61 from 61 nations

Medalists
gold medal	Tuba Yakan	Turkey
silver medal	Ivet Goranova	Bulgaria
bronze medal	Bárbara Pérez	Venezuela
bronze medal	Anzhelika Terliuga	Ukraine

The women's kumite 55 kg competition at the 2023 World Karate Championships was held on 25 and 28 October 2023.

== Results ==
=== Finals ===
Semifinals
(Turkey) Tuba Yakan	1
(Venezuela) Bárbara Pérez	0
(Bulgaria) Ivet Goranova	6
(Ukraine) Anzhelika Terliuga	4

Final
(Turkey) Tuba Yakan	8
(Bulgaria) Ivet Goranova	1

=== Repechage ===
Repechage 1
(Uzbekistan) Sevinch Rakhimova	5
(Japan) Shiori Nakamura	2

Repechage 2
(Uzbekistan) Sevinch Rakhimova	2
(Serbia) Brankica Negovanović	0

Repechage 3
(Uzbekistan) Sevinch Rakhimova	2
(Indonesia) Cok Istri Agung Sanistyarani	1

Bronze medal
(Uzbekistan) Sevinch Rakhimova	0
(Venezuela) Bárbara Pérez	1

Repechage 1
(Azerbaijan) Madina Sadigova	1
(France) Assma Charif	5

Repechage 2
(France) Assma Charif	3
(Chinese Taipei) Ku Tsui-ping	2

Repechage 3
(France) Assma Charif	0
(Iran) Fatemeh Saadati	1

Bronze medal
(Iran) Fatemeh Saadati	0
(Ukraine) Anzhelika Terliuga	0

=== Top half ===
==== Section 1 ====
First round
(Chile) Tihare Astudillo	1
(Macau) Wong Sok I	0
(Cyprus) Athena Kokkinidou	5
(Indonesia) Cok Istri Agung Sanistyarani	8
(Republic of Ireland) Ayla O'Sullivan	2
(Kosovo) Albulena Gervalla	5
(Sweden) Loren Zarei	0
(Kazakhstan) Gulmira Ussenova	10
(Paraguay) Yennifer Servín	4
(Jamaica) Valentyna Zolotarova	0
(England) Robin Vincent	1
(Serbia) Brankica Negovanović	6
(Uzbekistan) Sevinch Rakhimova	1
(Turkey) Tuba Yakan	5
(Senegal) Maimouna Niang	2
(Japan) Shiori Nakamura	3

Second round
(Chile) Tihare Astudillo	2
(Indonesia) Cok Istri Agung Sanistyarani	2
(Kosovo) Albulena Gervalla	0
(Kazakhstan) Gulmira Ussenova	2
(Paraguay) Yennifer Servín	2
(Serbia) Brankica Negovanović	8
(Turkey) Tuba Yakan	5
(Japan) Shiori Nakamura	4

Third round
(Indonesia) Cok Istri Agung Sanistyarani	7
(Kazakhstan) Gulmira Ussenova	3
(Serbia) Brankica Negovanović	1
(Turkey) Tuba Yakan	6

Quarterfinals
(Indonesia) Cok Istri Agung Sanistyarani	3
(Turkey) Tuba Yakan	11

==== Section 2 ====
First round
(Hong Kong) Choi Wan Yu	5
(Australia) Georgie Lawrence	3
(Slovakia) Nina Kvasnicová	9
(Turkmenistan) Ogulsuraý Täçdurdyýewa	0
(Luxembourg) Jennifer Warling	1
(Bosnia and Herzegovina) Nejra Sipović	0
(Switzerland) Maya Schärer	3
(United States) Trinity Allen	2
(Spain) Sonia Pereira	5
(Peru) Helen Antezana	1
(Croatia) Alessandra Hasani	0
(Venezuela) Bárbara Pérez	3
(Poland) Kseniya Dronchanka	1
(Portugal) Constança Matos	1

Second round
(Hong Kong) Choi Wan Yu	4
(Slovakia) Nina Kvasnicová	5
(Luxembourg) Jennifer Warling	3
(Switzerland) Maya Schärer	0
(Spain) Sonia Pereira	3
(Venezuela) Bárbara Pérez	4
(Poland) Kseniya Dronchanka	2
(Egypt) Ahlam Youssef	0

Third round
(Slovakia) Nina Kvasnicová	1
(Luxembourg) Jennifer Warling	6
(Venezuela) Bárbara Pérez	1
(Poland) Kseniya Dronchanka	1

Quarterfinals
(Luxembourg) Jennifer Warling	2
(Venezuela) Bárbara Pérez	4

=== Bottom half ===
==== Section 3 ====
First round
(France) Assma Charif	5
(Saudi Arabia) Malak Al-Kholaidi	0
(Bulgaria) Ivet Goranova	2
(Azerbaijan) Madina Sadigova	1
(Colombia) Stella Urango	2
(Mexico) Yuriko Cortés	3
(South Korea) Hwang Soo-hyun	0
(Chinese Taipei) Ku Tsui-ping	9
(China) Ding Jiamei	8
(Romania) Alina Guta	0
(Morocco) Sawsane Benchbab	1
(Algeria) Louiza Abouriche	7
(Iran) Fatemeh Saadati	4
(Tunisia) Chirine Zarrati	0

Second round
(France) Assma Charif	2
(Bulgaria) Ivet Goranova	7
(Mexico) Yuriko Cortés	1
(Chinese Taipei) Ku Tsui-ping	7
(China) Ding Jiamei	1
(Algeria) Louiza Abouriche	5
(Iran) Fatemeh Saadati	3
(Brazil) Valéria Kumizaki	2

Third round
(Bulgaria) Ivet Goranova	6
(Chinese Taipei) Ku Tsui-ping	0
(Algeria) Louiza Abouriche	0
(Iran) Fatemeh Saadati	5

Quarterfinals
(Bulgaria) Ivet Goranova	1
(Iran) Fatemeh Saadati	0

==== Section 4 ====
First round
(India) Alisha	9
(Hungary) Dalma Jakubovics	1
(North Macedonia) Jovana Georgieva	1
(Thailand) Sirigamolnate Chokprasertgul	3
(Denmark) Nicoline Olsen	0
(Latvia) Marija Luīze Muižniece	5
(Italy) Veronica Brunori	1
(Germany) Gizem Buğur	1
(Scotland) Amy Connell	0
Anna Chernysheva	2
(Argentina) Giuliana Novak	3
(Montenegro) Jovana Strujić	3
(Lithuania) Gabrielė Marozaitė	2
(Greece) Maria Stoli	3

Second round
(India) Alisha	1
(Thailand) Sirigamolnate Chokprasertgul	2
(Latvia) Marija Luīze Muižniece	2
(Italy) Veronica Brunori	1
Anna Chernysheva	7
(Montenegro) Jovana Strujić	0
(Greece) Maria Stoli	0
(Ukraine) Anzhelika Terliuga	2

Third round
(Thailand) Sirigamolnate Chokprasertgul	0
(Latvia) Marija Luīze Muižniece	1
Anna Chernysheva	0
(Ukraine) Anzhelika Terliuga	1

Quarterfinals
(Latvia) Marija Luīze Muižniece	2
(Ukraine) Anzhelika Terliuga	4
