= 2022 European Karate Championships – Women's 55 kg =

European Karate Championship

Women's 55 kg at the 2022 European Karate Championships
- Venue: Karataş Şahinbey Sport Hall
- Location: Gaziantep, Turkey
- Dates: 26–28 May
- Competitors: 31 from 31 nations

Medalists
gold medal	Anzhelika Terliuga	Ukraine
silver medal	Ivet Goranova	Bulgaria
bronze medal	Madina Sadigova	Azerbaijan
bronze medal	Amy Connell	Scotland

The Women's 55 kg competition at the 2022 European Karate Championships was held from 26 to 28 May 2022.

== Results ==
=== Finals ===
Semifinals
(Ukraine) Anzhelika Terliuga	2
(Italy) Veronica Brunori	1
(Bosnia and Herzegovina) Nejra Sipović	2
(Bulgaria) Ivet Goranova	3

Final
(Ukraine) Anzhelika Terliuga	11
(Bulgaria) Ivet Goranova	3

=== Repechage ===
Repechage 1
(Spain) Carlota Fernández	2
(Croatia) Ema Sgardelli	3

Repechage 2
(Croatia) Ema Sgardelli	1
(Azerbaijan) Madina Sadigova	5

Bronze medal
(Azerbaijan) Madina Sadigova	4
(Italy) Veronica Brunori	3

Repechage 1
(Scotland) Amy Connell	8
(Portugal) Constança Matos	1

Repechage 2
(Scotland) Amy Connell	4
(Greece) Maria Stoli	0

Bronze medal
(Scotland) Amy Connell	2
(Bosnia and Herzegovina) Nejra Sipović	1

=== Top half ===
==== Section 1 ====
Round of 32
(Ukraine) Anzhelika Terliuga	9
(Spain) Carlota Fernández	0
(Croatia) Ema Sgardelli	8
(Republic of Ireland) Jessie O'Reilly	0
(Azerbaijan) Madina Sadigova	5
(Slovakia) Hana Kuklová	1
(Luxembourg) Jennifer Warling	2
(Finland) Venla Karttunen	1

Round of 16
(Ukraine) Anzhelika Terliuga	3
(Croatia) Ema Sgardelli	1
(Azerbaijan) Madina Sadigova	5
(Luxembourg) Jennifer Warling	1

Quarterfinals
(Ukraine) Anzhelika Terliuga	8
(Azerbaijan) Madina Sadigova	0

==== Section 2 ====
Round of 32
(Latvia) Marija Muižniece	0
(Kosovo) Albulena Gervalla	1
(Lithuania) Gabrielė Marozaitė	8
(Netherlands) Merel Landman	1
(North Macedonia) Marija Mileva	3
(Turkey) Tuba Yakan	2
(Poland) Natalia Szponder	2
(Italy) Veronica Brunori	9

Round of 16
(Kosovo) Albulena Gervalla	2
(Lithuania) Gabrielė Marozaitė	1
(North Macedonia) Marija Mileva	0
(Italy) Veronica Brunori	1

Quarterfinals
(Kosovo) Albulena Gervalla	0
(Italy) Veronica Brunori	4

=== Bottom half ===
==== Section 3 ====
Round of 32
(Sweden) Matilda Rosenlind	4
(France) Tylla Levacher	1
(Serbia) Brankica Negovanović	2
(Bosnia and Herzegovina) Nejra Sipović	2
(Israel) Rotem Efroni	3
(Germany) Gizem Bugur	7
(Montenegro) Anđela Ivanović	0
(Hungary) Zsófia Baranyi	3

Round of 16
(Sweden) Matilda Rosenlind	2
(Bosnia and Herzegovina) Nejra Sipović	4
(Germany) Gizem Bugur	2
(Hungary) Zsófia Baranyi	3

Quarterfinals
(Bosnia and Herzegovina) Nejra Sipović	3
(Hungary) Zsófia Baranyi	0

==== Section 4 ====
Round of 32
(Scotland) Amy Connell	1
(Bulgaria) Ivet Goranova	2
(Romania) Alina Guţă	1
(Portugal) Constança Matos	6
(Greece) Maria Stoli	2
(Estonia) Li Lirisman	0

Round of 16
(Bulgaria) Ivet Goranova	7
(Portugal) Constança Matos	0
(Greece) Maria Stoli	0
(Switzerland) Maya Schärer	0

Quarterfinals
(Bulgaria) Ivet Goranova	1
(Greece) Maria Stoli	0
