= 2023 European Karate Championships – Women's 55 kg =

European Karate Championship

Women's 55 kg at the 2023 European Karate Championships
- Venue: Palacio Multiusos de Guadalajara
- Location: Guadalajara, Spain
- Dates: 23, 25 March
- Competitors: 29 from 29 nations

Medalists
gold medal	Anzhelika Terliuga	Ukraine
silver medal	Veronica Brunori	Italy
bronze medal	Tuba Yakan	Turkey
bronze medal	Gizem Bugur	Germany

The Women's 55 kg competition at the 2023 European Karate Championships was held on 23 and 25 March 2023.

== Results ==
=== Finals ===
Semifinals
(Italy) Veronica Brunori	9
(Bosnia and Herzegovina) Nejra Sipović	1
(Germany) Gizem Bugur	2
(Ukraine) Anzhelika Terliuga	3

Final
(Italy) Veronica Brunori	0
(Ukraine) Anzhelika Terliuga	8

=== Repechage ===
Repechage 1
(Lithuania) Gabrielė Marozaitė	3
(Poland) Maria Kerner	2

Repechage 2
(Lithuania) Gabrielė Marozaitė	0
(Turkey) Tuba Yakan	9

Bronze medal
(Turkey) Tuba Yakan	5
(Bosnia and Herzegovina) Nejra Sipović	0

Repechage
(England) Robin Vincent	4
(Scotland) Amy Connell	1

Bronze medal
(England) Robin Vincent	1
(Germany) Gizem Bugur	3

=== Top half ===
==== Section 1 ====
Round of 32
(Poland) Maria Kerner	4
(Israel) Rotem Efroni	3
(Lithuania) Gabrielė Marozaitė	1
(Italy) Veronica Brunori	4
(North Macedonia) Jovana Georgieva	1
(Croatia) Alessandra Hasani	9
(Sweden) Loren Zarei	1
(Turkey) Tuba Yakan	5

Round of 16
(Poland) Maria Kerner	1
(Italy) Veronica Brunori	4
(Croatia) Alessandra Hasani	4
(Turkey) Tuba Yakan	5

Quarterfinals
(Italy) Veronica Brunori	3
(Turkey) Tuba Yakan	1

==== Section 2 ====
Round of 32
(France) Assma Charif	5
(Republic of Ireland) Jessie O'Reilly	0
(Hungary) Zsófia Baranyi	0
(Bosnia and Herzegovina) Nejra Sipović	3
(Montenegro) Jovana Strujić	3
(Portugal) Constança Matos	3

Round of 16
(France) Assma Charif	0
(Bosnia and Herzegovina) Nejra Sipović	2
(Portugal) Constança Matos	1
(Azerbaijan) Madina Sadigova	4

Quarterfinals
(Bosnia and Herzegovina) Nejra Sipović	6
(Azerbaijan) Madina Sadigova	0

=== Bottom half ===
==== Section 3 ====
Round of 32
(Luxembourg) Laura Hoffmann	0
(Serbia) Brankica Negovanović	4
(Spain) Sonia Pereira	6
(Greece) Maria Stoli	3
(Cyprus) Arianne Gonzales	2
(Bulgaria) Ivana Kamenova	3

Round of 16
(Serbia) Brankica Negovanović	1
(Spain) Sonia Pereira	0
(Bulgaria) Ivana Kamenova	0
(Germany) Gizem Bugur	2

Quarterfinals
(Serbia) Brankica Negovanović	1
(Germany) Gizem Bugur	3

==== Section 4 ====
Round of 32
(Slovenia) Ela Petan	2
(Slovakia) Hana Kuklová	3
(Scotland) Amy Connell	3
(Switzerland) Maya Schärer	0
(Romania) Bianca Iorga	0
(England) Robin Vincent	7

Round of 16
(Slovakia) Hana Kuklová	1
(Scotland) Amy Connell	5
(England) Robin Vincent	0
(Ukraine) Anzhelika Terliuga	8

Quarterfinals
(Scotland) Amy Connell	0
(Ukraine) Anzhelika Terliuga	3
