= Chinese Taipei at the 2020 Summer Olympics =

- IOC code: TPE
- NOC: Chinese Taipei Olympic Committee
- Website: www.tpenoc.net (in Chinese and English)

in Tokyo, Japan July 23, 2021 – August 8, 2021
- Competitors: 68 in 18 sports
- Flag bearers (opening): Kuo Hsing-chun; Lu Yen-hsun
- Flag bearer (closing): Chen Chieh
- Medals Ranked 34th: Gold 2 Silver 4 Bronze 6 Total 12

Summer Olympics appearances (overview)
- 1956; 1960; 1964; 1968; 1972; 1976–1980; 1984; 1988; 1992; 1996; 2000; 2004; 2008; 2012; 2016; 2020; 2024

Other related appearances
- Republic of China (1924–1948)

Taiwan competed under the designated name "Chinese Taipei" at the 2020 Summer Olympics in Tokyo. Originally scheduled to take place from 24 July to 9 August 2020, the Games were postponed to 23 July to 8 August 2021, due to the COVID-19 pandemic. It was also the nation's tenth consecutive appearance at the Summer Olympics.

Taiwan rewards their Olympic gold medalists with 20 million New Taiwan dollars (US $716,000) and additionally rewards their athletes who finish from second to seventh or eighth in their events with proportionate trickled down amounts.

== Medalists ==
Medal	Name	Sport	Event	Date
Gold	Kuo Hsing-chun	Weightlifting	Women's 59 kg	27 July
Gold	Lee Yang; Wang Chi-lin	Badminton	Men's doubles	31 July
Silver	Yang Yung-wei	Judo	Men's 60 kg	24 July
Silver	Deng Yu-cheng; Tang Chih-chun; Wei Chun-heng	Archery	Men's team	26 July
Silver	Lee Chih-kai	Gymnastics	Men's pommel horse	1 August
Silver	Tai Tzu-ying	Badminton	Women's singles	1 August
Bronze	Lo Chia-ling	Taekwondo	Women's 57 kg	25 July
Bronze	Lin Yun-ju; Cheng I-ching	Table tennis	Mixed doubles	26 July
Bronze	Chen Wen-huei	Weightlifting	Women's 64 kg	27 July
Bronze	Pan Cheng-tsung	Golf	Men's individual	1 August
Bronze	Huang Hsiao-wen	Boxing	Women's flyweight	4 August
Bronze	Wen Tzu-yun	Karate	Women's 55 kg	5 August

Medals by sport
Sport	1st place, gold medalist(s)	2nd place, silver medalist(s)	3rd place, bronze medalist(s)	Total
Archery	0	1	0	1
Badminton	1	1	0	2
Boxing	0	0	1	1
Golf	0	0	1	1
Gymnastics	0	1	0	1
Judo	0	1	0	1
Karate	0	0	1	1
Table tennis	0	0	1	1
Taekwondo	0	0	1	1
Weightlifting	1	0	1	2
Total	2	4	6	12

== Competitors ==
The following is the list of number of competitors in the Games.

Sport	Men	Women	Total
Archery	3	3	6
Athletics	5	1	6
Badminton	4	1	5
Boxing	0	4	4
Canoeing	0	1	1
Cycling	1	0	1
Equestrian	0	1	1
Golf	1	2	3
Gymnastics	4	1	5
Judo	1	2	3
Karate	1	1	2
Rowing	0	1	1
Shooting	2	3	5
Swimming	2	1	3
Table tennis	3	3	6
Taekwondo	2	2	4
Tennis	1	4	5
Weightlifting	3	4	7
Total	33	35	68

== Archery ==
Taiwanese archers qualified each for the men's and women's events by reaching the quarterfinal stage of their respective team recurves at the 2019 World Archery Championships in 's-Hertogenbosch, Netherlands.

The Taiwanese archery team for the Games, led by two-time Olympian Tan Ya-ting and reigning world champion Lei Chien-ying in the women's individual recurve, was announced on 16 January 2020, based on the results at the Olympic Team Trials.

Men

Athlete	Event	Ranking round		Round of 64	Round of 32	Round of 16	Quarterfinals	Semifinals	Final / BM	
Athlete	Event	Score	Seed	Opposition Score	Opposition Score	Opposition Score	Opposition Score	Opposition Score	Opposition Score	Rank
Tang Chih-chun	Individual	668	12	Nguyễn (VIE); W 7–1	Wei C-h (TPE); W 6–5	Shanny (ISR); W 6–5	Kim W-j (KOR); W 6–4	Nespoli (ITA); L 2–6	Furukawa (JPN); L 3–7	4
Wei Chun-heng	Individual	661	21	Castro (ESP); W 6–2	Tang C-c (TPE); L 5–6	Did not advance				
Deng Yu-cheng	Individual	656	30	Das (IND); L 4–6	Did not advance					
Deng Yu-cheng; Tang Chih-chun; Wei Chun-heng	Team	1985	6	—N/a		Australia; W 5–4	China; W 5–1	Netherlands; W 6–0	South Korea; L 0–6	2nd place, silver medalist(s)

Women

Athlete	Event	Ranking round		Round of 64	Round of 32	Round of 16	Quarterfinals	Semifinals	Final / BM	
Athlete	Event	Score	Seed	Opposition Score	Opposition Score	Opposition Score	Opposition Score	Opposition Score	Opposition Score	Rank
Lin Chia-en	Individual	651	21	Psarra (GRE); W 6–4	Pärnat (EST); W 7–3	Brown (USA); L 2–6	Did not advance			
Lei Chien-ying	Individual	640	30	Marchenko (UKR); L 4–6	Did not advance					
Tan Ya-ting	Individual	646	27	Pitman (GBR); L 4–6	Did not advance					
Lei Chien-ying; Lin Chia-en; Tan Ya-ting	Team	1937	7	—N/a		Germany; L 2–6	Did not advance			

Mixed

Athlete	Event	Ranking round		Round of 16	Quarterfinals	Semifinals	Final / BM	
Athlete	Event	Score	Seed	Opposition Score	Opposition Score	Opposition Score	Opposition Score	Rank
Tang Chih-chun; Lin Chia-en	Team	1319	8 Q	India; L 3–5	Did not advance			

== Athletics ==
Taiwanese athletes further achieved the entry standards, either by qualifying time or by world ranking, in the following track and field events (up to a maximum of 3 athletes in each event), plus a female sprinter for Universality places:

Key

- Note–Ranks given for track events are within the athlete's heat only
- Q = Qualified for the next round
- q = Qualified for the next round as a fastest loser or, in field events, by position without achieving the qualifying target
- NR = National record
- N/A = Round not applicable for the event
- Bye = Athlete not required to compete in round

Track & road events

Athlete	Event	Heat		Quarterfinal		Semifinal		Final	
Athlete	Event	Result	Rank	Result	Rank	Result	Rank	Result	Rank
Yang Chun-han	Men's 100 m	Bye		10.21	5	Did not advance			
Chen Kuei-ru	Men's 110 m hurdles	13.53	5 q	—N/a		13.57	6	Did not advance	
Chen Chieh	Men's 400 m hurdles	50.96	7	—N/a		Did not advance			
Hsieh Hsi-en	Women's 100 m	Bye		12.49	6	Did not advance			

Field events

Athlete	Event	Qualification		Final	
Athlete	Event	Distance	Position	Distance	Position
Cheng Chao-tsun	Men's javelin throw	71.20	30	Did not advance	
Huang Shih-feng	Men's javelin throw	77.16	25	Did not advance	

== Badminton ==
Chinese Taipei entered five badminton players for each of the following events into the Olympic tournament based on the BWF Race to Tokyo Rankings.

Athlete	Event	Group stage				Elimination	Quarterfinal	Semifinal	Final / BM	
Athlete	Event	Opposition Score	Opposition Score	Opposition Score	Rank	Opposition Score	Opposition Score	Opposition Score	Opposition Score	Rank
Chou Tien-chen	Men's singles	Burestedt (SWE); W (21–12, 21–11)	Yang (CAN); W (21–18, 16–21, 22–20)	—N/a	1 Q	Bye	Chen L (CHN); L (14–21, 21–9, 14–21)	Did not advance		
Wang Tzu-wei	Men's singles	Karunaratne (SRI); W (21–12, 21–15)	Nguyen (IRL); W (21–12, 18–21, 21–12)	—N/a	1 Q	Axelsen (DEN); L (16–21, 14–21)	Did not advance			
Lee Yang; Wang Chi-lin	Men's doubles	Rankireddy / Shetty (IND); L (16–21, 21–16, 25–27)	Lane / Vendy (GBR); W (21–17, 21–14)	Gideon / Sukamuljo (INA); W (21–18, 15–21, 21–17)	2 Q	—N/a	Endo / Watanabe (JPN); W (21–16, 21–19)	Ahsan / Setiawan (INA); W (21–11, 21–10)	Li Jh / Liu Yc (CHN); W (21–18, 21–12)	1st place, gold medalist(s)
Tai Tzu-ying	Women's singles	Jaquet (SUI); W (21–7, 21–13)	Nguyễn (VIE); W (21–16, 21–11)	Qi (FRA); W (21–10, 21–13)	1 Q	Bye	Intanon (THA); W (14–21, 21–18, 21–18)	Sindhu (IND); W (21–18, 21–12)	Chen Yf (CHN); L (18–21, 21–19, 18–21)	2nd place, silver medalist(s)

== Boxing ==
Chinese Taipei entered four female boxers into the Olympic tournament. Reigning world bantamweight champion Huang Hsiao-wen (women's flyweight), 2019 world bronze medalist Lin Yu-ting (women's featherweight), Wu Shih-yi (women's lightweight), and Rio 2016 Olympian Chen Nien-chin (women's welterweight) secured the spots on the Taiwanese squad by advancing to the semifinal match of their respective weight divisions at the 2020 Asia & Oceania Qualification Tournament in Amman, Jordan.

Athlete	Event	Round of 32	Round of 16	Quarterfinals	Semifinals	Final	
Athlete	Event	Opposition Result	Opposition Result	Opposition Result	Opposition Result	Opposition Result	Rank
Huang Hsiao-wen	Women's flyweight	Bye	Sorrentino (ITA); W 5–0	Radovanović (SRB); W 5–0	Çakıroğlu (TUR); L 0–5	Did not advance	3rd place, bronze medalist(s)
Lin Yu-ting	Women's featherweight	Bye	Petecio (PHI); L 2–3	Did not advance			
Wu Shih-yi	Women's lightweight	Alexiusson (SWE); W 4–1	Ferreira (BRA); L 0–5	Did not advance			
Chen Nien-chin	Women's welterweight	Bye	Carini (ITA); W 3–2	Borgohain (IND); L 1–4	Did not advance		

== Canoeing ==
=== Slalom ===
Chinese Taipei entered one canoeist to compete in the women's K-1 class at the Games, as the International Canoe Federation accepted the nation's request to claim an unused berth from the 2020 Oceania Championships.

Athlete	Event	Preliminary						Semifinal		Final	
Athlete	Event	Run 1	Rank	Run 2	Rank	Best	Rank	Time	Rank	Time	Rank
Chang Chu-han	Women's K-1	182.95	26	136.66	25	136.66	26	Did not advance			

== Cycling ==
=== Road ===
Chinese Taipei entered one rider each to compete in the men's Olympic road race, by finishing in the top two, not yet qualified, at the 2019 Asian Championships in Tashkent, Uzbekistan.

Athlete	Event	Time	Rank
Feng Chun-kai	Men's road race	Did not finish	

== Equestrian ==
Chinese Taipei entered one jumping rider into the Olympic competition by finishing in the top two, outside the group selection, of the individual FEI Olympic Rankings for Group G (South East Asia and Oceania).

=== Jumping ===
Athlete	Horse	Event	Qualification		Final		
Athlete	Horse	Event	Penalties	Rank	Penalties	Time	Rank
Jasmine Chen	Benitus di Vallerano	Individual	9	=47	Did not advance		

== Golf ==
Chinese Taipei entered one male golfer and two female golfers into the Olympic tournament.

Athlete	Event	Round 1	Round 2	Round 3	Round 4	Playoff	Total		
Athlete	Event	Score	Score	Score	Score	Score	Score	Par	Rank
Pan Cheng-tsung	Men's	74	66	66	63	14	269	−15	3rd place, bronze medalist(s)
Hsu Wei-ling	Women's	69	69	71	66	—	275	−9	=15
Min Lee	Women's	69	69	72	72	—	282	−2	=34

== Gymnastics ==
=== Artistic ===
Chinese Taipei fielded a full team of five artistic gymnasts (four men and one woman) into the Olympic competition. The men's squad claimed one of the remaining nine spots in the team all-around at the 2019 World Championships in Stuttgart, Germany, making its first trip to the Games since 1964. On the women's side, Ting Hua-tien received a spare berth from the apparatus events, as one of the twelve highest-ranked gymnasts, neither part of the team nor qualified directly through the all-around, at the same tournament. The men's team was announced on 6 June 2021.

Men
Team

Athlete	Event	Qualification								Final							
Athlete	Event	Apparatus						Total	Rank	Apparatus						Total	Rank
Athlete	Event	F	PH	R	V	PB	HB	Total	Rank	F	PH	R	V	PB	HB	Total	Rank
Hung Yuan-hsi	Team	13.233	10.766	12.633	12.966	11.500	13.000	74.098	60	Did not advance							
Lee Chih-kai	Team	14.200	15.266 Q	13.033	14.500	14.233	13.000	84.332	17 Q	Did not advance							
Shiao Yu-jan	Team	13.833	12.900	12.833	14.333	12.100	11.800	77.799	54	Did not advance							
Tang Chia-hung	Team	14.333	13.000	13.833	14.400	13.966	13.400	82.932	22 Q	Did not advance							
Total	Team	42.366	41.166	39.699	43.233	40.299	39.500	246.263	10	Did not advance							

Individual

Athlete	Event	Qualification								Final							
Athlete	Event	Apparatus						Total	Rank	Apparatus						Total	Rank
Athlete	Event	F	PH	R	V	PB	HB	Total	Rank	F	PH	R	V	PB	HB	Total	Rank
Lee Chih-kai	All-around	See team results								14.400	12.666	12.733	14.400	13.900	12.600	80.699	21
Lee Chih-kai	Pommel horse	—N/a	15.266	—N/a				15.266	1 Q	—N/a	15.400	—N/a				15.400	2nd place, silver medalist(s)
Tang Chia-hung	All-around	See team results								14.366	13.333	14.100	14.433	13.800	14.766	84.798	7

Women

Athlete	Event	Qualification						Final					
Athlete	Event	Apparatus				Total	Rank	Apparatus				Total	Rank
Athlete	Event	V	UB	BB	F	Total	Rank	V	UB	BB	F	Total	Rank
Ting Hua-tien	Uneven bars	—N/a	12.233	—N/a		12.233	63	Did not advance					
Ting Hua-tien	Balance beam	—N/a		12.566	—N/a	12.566	50	Did not advance					

== Judo ==
Chinese Taipei entered three judoka (one men and two women) into the Olympic tournament based on the International Judo Federation Olympics Individual Ranking.

Athlete	Event	Round of 32	Round of 16	Quarterfinals	Semifinals	Repechage	Final / BM	
Athlete	Event	Opposition Result	Opposition Result	Opposition Result	Opposition Result	Opposition Result	Opposition Result	Rank
Yang Yung-wei	Men's −60 kg	Bye	Gerchev (BUL); W 10–00	Tsjakadoea (NED); W 10–00	Mkheidze (FRA); W 10–00	Bye	Takato (JPN); L 00–10	2nd place, silver medalist(s)
Lin Chen-hao	Women's −48 kg	Milani (ITA); W 10–01	Dolgova (ROC); W 10–01	Krasniqi (KOS); L 00–10	Did not advance	Rishony (ISR); L 00–10	Did not advance	7
Lien Chen-ling	Women's −57 kg	Bye	Kajzer (SLO); L 00–10	Did not advance				

== Karate ==
Chinese Taipei entered two karateka into the inaugural Olympic tournament. 2018 world bronze medalist Wen Tzu-yun qualified directly for the women's kumite 55-kg category by finishing among the top four karateka at the end of the combined WKF Olympic Rankings.

Kumite

Athlete	Event	Group stage				Semifinals	Final	
Athlete	Event	Opposition Result	Opposition Result	Opposition Result	Rank	Opposition Result	Opposition Result	Rank
Wen Tzu-yun	Women's −55 kg	Goranova (BUL); L 2–5	Bahmanyar (IRI); W 5–1	Özçelik (TUR); W 5–4	2 Q	Terliuga (UKR); L 4–4	Did not advance	3rd place, bronze medalist(s)

Kata

Athlete	Event	Elimination round		Ranking round		Final / BM	
Athlete	Event	Score	Rank	Score	Rank	Opposition Result	Rank
Wang Yi-ta	Men's kata	24.97	5	Did not advance			

== Rowing ==
Chinese Taipei qualified one boat in the women's single sculls for the Games by winning the bronze medal and securing the first of five berths available at the 2021 FISA Asia & Oceania Olympic Qualification Regatta in Tokyo, Japan.

Athlete	Event	Heats		Repechage		Quarterfinals		Semifinals		Final	
Athlete	Event	Time	Rank	Time	Rank	Time	Rank	Time	Rank	Time	Rank
Huang Yi-ting	Women's single sculls	8:04.59	4 R	8:11.56	2 QF	8:34.51	6 SC/D	7:56.00	5 FD	7:52.18	20

Qualification Legend: FA=Final A (medal); FB=Final B (non-medal); FC=Final C (non-medal); FD=Final D (non-medal); FE=Final E (non-medal); FF=Final F (non-medal); SA/B=Semifinals A/B; SC/D=Semifinals C/D; SE/F=Semifinals E/F; QF=Quarterfinals; R=Repechage

== Shooting ==
Taiwanese shooters achieved quota places for the following events by virtue of their best finishes at the 2018 ISSF World Championships, the 2019 ISSF World Cup series, and Asian Championships, as long as they obtained a minimum qualifying score (MQS) by 31 May 2020.

Athlete	Event	Qualification		Semifinal		Final	
Athlete	Event	Points	Rank	Points	Rank	Points	Rank
Lu Shao-chuan	Men's 10 m air rifle	626.3	17	—N/a		Did not advance	
Yang Kun-pi	Men's trap	121	14	—N/a		Did not advance	
Lin Ying-shin	Women's 10 m air rifle	623.4	26	—N/a		Did not advance	
Tien Chia-chen	Women's 10 m air pistol	559	42	—N/a		Did not advance	
Tien Chia-chen	Women's 25 m pistol	584	5 Q	—N/a		10	8
Wu Chia-ying	Women's 10 m air pistol	573	14	—N/a		Did not advance	
Wu Chia-ying	Women's 25 m pistol	584	7 Q	—N/a		23	5
Lin Ying-shin; Lu Shao-chuan	10 m air rifle team	625.4	14	Did not advance			

== Swimming ==
Taiwanese swimmers further achieved qualifying standards in the following events (up to a maximum of 2 swimmers in each event at the Olympic Qualifying Time (OQT), and potentially 1 at the Olympic Selection Time (OST)):

Athlete	Event	Heat		Semifinal		Final	
Athlete	Event	Time	Rank	Time	Rank	Time	Rank
Wang Hsing-hao	Men's 200 m individual medley	2:00.72	37	Did not advance			
Wang Hsing-hao	Men's 400 m individual medley	4:19.06	25	—N/a		Did not advance	
Wang Kuan-hung	Men's 100 m butterfly	52.44	=35	Did not advance			
Wang Kuan-hung	Men's 200 m butterfly	1:54.44	2 Q	1:55.52	13	Did not advance	
Huang Mei-chien	Women's 50 m freestyle	25.99	38	Did not advance			

== Table tennis ==
Chinese Taipei entered six athletes into the table tennis competition at the Games. The men's and women's teams secured their respective berths by advancing to the quarterfinal round of the 2020 World Olympic Qualification Event in Gondomar, Portugal, permitting a maximum of two starters to compete each in the men's and women's singles tournament. Moreover, an additional berth was awarded to the Taiwanese table tennis players competing in the inaugural mixed doubles by advancing to the semifinal stage of the 2019 ITTF World Tour Grand Finals in Zhengzhou, China.

Men

Athlete	Event	Preliminary	Round 1	Round 2	Round 3	Round of 16	Quarterfinals	Semifinals	Final / BM	
Athlete	Event	Opposition Result	Opposition Result	Opposition Result	Opposition Result	Opposition Result	Opposition Result	Opposition Result	Opposition Result	Rank
Chuang Chih-yuan	Singles	Bye		Cifuentes (ARG); W 4–3	Wong (HKG); W 4–1	Assar (EGY); L 3–4	Did not advance			
Lin Yun-ju	Singles	Bye			Källberg (SWE); W 4–1	Tsuboi (BRA); W 4–2	Jorgić (SLO); W 4–0	Fan Zd (CHN); L 3–4	Ovtcharov (GER); L 3–4	4
Chen Chien-an; Chuang Chih-yuan; Lin Yun-ju	Team	—N/a				Croatia; W 3–0	Germany; L 2–3	Did not advance		

Women

Athlete	Event	Preliminary	Round 1	Round 2	Round 3	Round of 16	Quarterfinals	Semifinals	Final / BM	
Athlete	Event	Opposition Result	Opposition Result	Opposition Result	Opposition Result	Opposition Result	Opposition Result	Opposition Result	Opposition Result	Rank
Chen Szu-yu	Singles	Bye			Zhang (USA); W 4–0	Sun Ys (CHN); L 0–4	Did not advance			
Cheng I-ching	Singles	Bye			Yu My (SGP); L 0–4	Did not advance				
Chen Szu-yu; Cheng Hsien-tzu; Cheng I-ching	Team	—N/a				United States; W 3–0	Japan; L 0–3	Did not advance		

Mixed

Athlete	Event	Round of 16	Quarterfinals	Semifinals	Final / BM	
Athlete	Event	Opposition Result	Opposition Result	Opposition Result	Opposition Result	Rank
Lin Yun-ju; Cheng I-ching	Doubles	Achanta / Batra (IND); W 4–0	Lee S-s / Jeon J-h (KOR); W 4–2	Mizutani / Ito (JPN); L 1–4	Lebesson / Yuan (FRA); W 4–0	3rd place, bronze medalist(s)

== Taekwondo ==
Chinese Taipei entered four athletes into the taekwondo competition at the Games. Huang Yu-jen (men's 68 kg), Rio 2016 Olympian and 2015 world champion Liu Wei-ting (men's 80 kg), reigning Asian Games gold medalist Su Po-ya (women's 49 kg), and Lo Chia-ling (women's 57 kg) secured the spots on the Taiwanese taekwondo squad with a top two finish each in their respective weight classes at the 2021 Asian Qualification Tournament in Amman, Jordan.

Athlete	Event	Qualification	Round of 16	Quarterfinals	Semifinals	Repechage 1	Repechage 2	Final / BM	
Athlete	Event	Opposition Result	Opposition Result	Opposition Result	Opposition Result	Opposition Result	Opposition Result	Opposition Result	Rank
Huang Yu-jen	Men's −68 kg	Bye	Hosseini (IRI); L 15–18	Did not advance					
Liu Wei-ting	Men's −80 kg	—N/a	Beigi (AZE); L 11–15	Did not advance		—N/a	Did not advance		
Su Po-ya	Women's −49 kg	Bye	Yamada (JPN); L 9–10	Did not advance					
Lo Chia-ling	Women's −57 kg	Bye	Lee A-r (KOR); W 20–18	Park (CAN); W 18–9	Zolotic (USA); L 5–28	Bye		Ben Yessouf (NIG); W 10–6	3rd place, bronze medalist(s)

== Tennis ==
Athlete	Event	Round of 64	Round of 32	Round of 16	Quarterfinals	Semifinals	Final / BM	
Athlete	Event	Opposition Score	Opposition Score	Opposition Score	Opposition Score	Opposition Score	Opposition Score	Rank
Lu Yen-hsun	Men's singles	Zverev (GER); L 1–6, 3–6	Did not advance					
Chan Hao-ching; Latisha Chan	Women's doubles	—N/a	Niculescu / Olaru (ROU); L 5–7, 6–1, [6–10]	Did not advance				
Hsieh Yu-chieh; Hsu Chieh-yu	Women's doubles	—N/a	Krejčíková / Siniaková (CZE); L 2–6, 1–6	Did not advance				

== Weightlifting ==
Chinese Taipei weightlifters qualified for 7 quota places at the games, based on the Tokyo 2020 Rankings Qualification List of 20 June 2021.

Men

Athlete	Event	Snatch		Clean & jerk		Total	Rank
Athlete	Event	Result	Rank	Result	Rank	Total	Rank
Kao Chan-hung	−61 kg	125	9	~~147~~	—	125	DNF
Chen Po-jen	−96 kg	176	5	205	6	381	5
Hsieh Yun-ting	+109 kg	172	13	206	10	378	12

Women

Athlete	Event	Snatch		Clean & jerk		Total	Rank
Athlete	Event	Result	Rank	Result	Rank	Total	Rank
Fang Wan-ling	−49 kg	80	8	101	4	181	4
Chiang Nien-hsin	−55 kg	81	12	95	13	176	13
Kuo Hsing-chun	−59 kg	103 OR	1	133 OR	1	236 OR	1st place, gold medalist(s)
Chen Wen-huei	−64 kg	103	4	127	3	230	3rd place, bronze medalist(s)
