= 2021 World Karate Championships – Women's 55 kg =

World Karate Championship

Women's kumite 55 kg at the 2021 World Karate Championships
- Venue: Hamdan Sports Complex
- Location: Dubai, United Arab Emirates
- Dates: 17–20 November
- Competitors: 58 from 58 nations

Medalists
gold medal	Ahlam Youssef	Egypt
silver medal	Trinity Allen	United States
bronze medal	Ivet Goranova	Bulgaria
bronze medal	Anna Chernysheva

The Women's 55 kg competition at the 2021 World Karate Championships was held from 17 to 20 November 2021.

== Results ==
=== Finals ===
Semifinals
(United States) Trinity Allen	5
(Luxembourg) Jennifer Warling	1
Anna Chernysheva	3
(Egypt) Ahlam Youssef	6

Final
(United States) Trinity Allen	0
(Egypt) Ahlam Youssef	0

=== Repechage ===
Repechage 1
(Singapore) Tan Shi Ying	1
(Kosovo) Albulena Gervalla	2

Repechage 2
(Kosovo) Albulena Gervalla	3
(Colombia) Geraldine Peña	4

Repechage 3
(Colombia) Geraldine Peña	2
(Bulgaria) Ivet Goranova	2

Bronze medal
(Bulgaria) Ivet Goranova	4
(Luxembourg) Jennifer Warling	1

Repechage 1
(Croatia) Alessandra Hasani	6
(Turkey) Umay Uygur	3

Repechage 2
(Croatia) Alessandra Hasani	6
(Cyprus) Arianne Gonzales	0

Repechage 3
(Croatia) Alessandra Hasani	3
(Uzbekistan) Sevinch Rakhimova	3

Bronze medal
(Uzbekistan) Sevinch Rakhimova	0
Anna Chernysheva	1

=== Top half ===
==== Section 1 ====
First round
(Scotland) Amy Connell	1
(Kosovo) Albulena Gervalla	3
(United States) Trinity Allen	8
(Singapore) Tan Shi Ying	0
(Jamaica) Valentyna Zolotarova	4
(Kazakhstan) Sabina Zakharova	6
(Colombia) Geraldine Peña	7
(Belgium) Hanne Michiels	0
(Montenegro) Jovana Strujić	1
(Brazil) Valéria Kumizaki	4
(Ukraine) Anzhelika Terliuga	6
(South Korea) Hwang Soo-hyun	0
(Ecuador) Mikaela Enríquez	3
(Malaysia) Madhuri Poovanesan	0

Second round
(Kosovo) Albulena Gervalla	0
(United States) Trinity Allen	4
(Kazakhstan) Sabina Zakharova	1
(Colombia) Geraldine Peña	4
(Brazil) Valéria Kumizaki	0
(Ukraine) Anzhelika Terliuga	5
(Ecuador) Mikaela Enríquez	0
(Bulgaria) Ivet Goranova	1

Third round
(United States) Trinity Allen	5
(Colombia) Geraldine Peña	1
(Ukraine) Anzhelika Terliuga	3
(Bulgaria) Ivet Goranova	5

Quarterfinals
(United States) Trinity Allen	5
(Bulgaria) Ivet Goranova	4

==== Section 2 ====
First round
(Azerbaijan) Ilaha Gasimova	2
(Switzerland) Maya Schärer	2
(Denmark) Caroline Alberg	1
(Luxembourg) Jennifer Warling	1
(Belarus) Irina Sharykhina	8
(Bangladesh) Marzan Akter Priya	0
Cok Istri Agung Sanistyarani	5
(Spain) Carlota Fernández	2
(Canada) Kathryn Campbell	0
(Chile) Valentina Toro	8
(Italy) Lorena Busà	2
(Republic of Ireland) Jessie O'Reilly	0

Second round
(Switzerland) Maya Schärer	2
(Luxembourg) Jennifer Warling	9
(Belarus) Irina Sharykhina	3
(Hungary) Zsófia Baranyi	0
Cok Istri Agung Sanistyarani	2
(Chile) Valentina Toro	9
(Italy) Lorena Busà	4
(Germany) Gizem Bugur	3

Third round
(Luxembourg) Jennifer Warling	2
(Belarus) Irina Sharykhina	0
(Chile) Valentina Toro	7
(Italy) Lorena Busà	1

Quarterfinals
(Luxembourg) Jennifer Warling	3
(Chile) Valentina Toro	1

=== Bottom half ===
==== Section 3 ====
First round
(Japan) Sara Yamada	3
(Serbia) Brankica Negovanović	4
(France) Léa Avazeri	9
(Turkmenistan) Ogulgerek Kichenova	0
(Romania) Bianca Iorga	0
(Sweden) Loren Zarei	0
(Hong Kong) Cheung Chu Ngan	8
(India) Jyoti Bisht	0
(Bosnia and Herzegovina) Paola Kostić	6
(Iceland) Iveta Chavdarova Ivanova	0
(Cameroon) Léa Claire Nana Noukella	0
(Latvia) Marija Luīze Muižniece	2
Anna Chernysheva	4
(Kenya) Rose Wanjiku	0

Second round
(Serbia) Brankica Negovanović	0
(France) Léa Avazeri	2
(Sweden) Loren Zarei	5
(Hong Kong) Cheung Chu Ngan	4
(Bosnia and Herzegovina) Paola Kostić	1
(Latvia) Marija Luīze Muižniece	1
Anna Chernysheva	5
(Chinese Taipei) Wen Tzu-yun	4

Third round
(France) Léa Avazeri	1
(Sweden) Loren Zarei	0
(Bosnia and Herzegovina) Paola Kostić	0
Anna Chernysheva	3

Quarterfinals
(France) Léa Avazeri	0
Anna Chernysheva	4

==== Section 4 ====
First round
(Turkey) Umay Uygur	4
(Slovakia) Natália Vargová	1
(Croatia) Alessandra Hasani	2
(Egypt) Ahlam Youssef	3
(Poland) Weronika Mikulska	0
(Finland) Venla Karttunen	6
(South Africa) Candice Leslie	0
(Uzbekistan) Sevinch Rakhimova	10
(Algeria) Widad Draou	0
(North Macedonia) Jovana Georgieva	3
(Israel) Rotem Efroni	1
(Greece) Maria Stoli	3

Second round
(Turkey) Umay Uygur	2
(Egypt) Ahlam Youssef	10
(Finland) Venla Karttunen	2
(Cyprus) Arianne Gonzales	3
(Uzbekistan) Sevinch Rakhimova	11
(North Macedonia) Jovana Georgieva	1
(Greece) Maria Stoli	2
(Morocco) Hanane Malal	1

Third round
(Egypt) Ahlam Youssef	9
(Cyprus) Arianne Gonzales	0
(Uzbekistan) Sevinch Rakhimova	2
(Greece) Maria Stoli	0

Quarterfinals
(Egypt) Ahlam Youssef	9
(Uzbekistan) Sevinch Rakhimova	1
