= Karate at the 2019 European Games – Women's kumite 55 kg =

Women's kumite 55 kg at the 2019 European Games
- Venue: Čyžoŭka-Arena
- Date: 30 June
- Competitors: 8 from 8 nations

Medalists
gold medal	Ivet Goranova	Bulgaria
silver medal	Anzhelika Terliuga	Ukraine
bronze medal	Jana Bitsch	Germany
bronze medal	Jennifer Warling	Luxembourg

The women's kumite 55 kg competition at the 2019 European Games in Minsk was held on 30 June 2019 at the Čyžoŭka-Arena.

== Schedule ==
All times are local (UTC+3).

Date	Time	Event
Sunday, 30 June 2019	09:00	Elimination round
Sunday, 30 June 2019	15:16	Semifinals
Sunday, 30 June 2019	16:44	Final

== Results ==
=== Elimination round ===
==== Group A ====
Rank	Athlete	B	W	D	L	Pts	Score
1	Jana Bitsch (GER)	3	1	2	0	4	5–2
2	Jennifer Warling (LUX)	3	1	2	0	4	4–0
3	Dorota Banaszczyk (POL)	3	1	2	0	4	4–1
4	Irina Sharykhina (BLR)	3	0	0	3	0	3–13

	Score	
Jennifer Warling (LUX)	0–0	Jana Bitsch (GER)
Irina Sharykhina (BLR)	1–4	Dorota Banaszczyk (POL)
Irina Sharykhina (BLR)	2–5	Jana Bitsch (GER)
Jennifer Warling (LUX)	0–0	Dorota Banaszczyk (POL)
Dorota Banaszczyk (POL)	0–0	Jana Bitsch (GER)
Jennifer Warling (LUX)	4–0	Irina Sharykhina (BLR)

==== Group B ====
Rank	Athlete	B	W	D	L	Pts	Score
1	Ivet Goranova (BUL)	3	3	0	0	6	8–4
2	Anzhelika Terliuga (UKR)	3	2	0	1	4	4–1
3	Tuba Yakan (TUR)	3	1	0	2	2	7–8
4	Amy Connell (GBR)	3	0	0	3	0	3–9

	Score	
Anzhelika Terliuga (UKR)	1–0	Tuba Yakan (TUR)
Ivet Goranova (BUL)	2–1	Amy Connell (GBR)
Ivet Goranova (BUL)	6–3	Tuba Yakan (TUR)
Anzhelika Terliuga (UKR)	3–1	Amy Connell (GBR)
Amy Connell (GBR)	1–4	Tuba Yakan (TUR)
Anzhelika Terliuga (UKR)	0–8	Ivet Goranova (BUL)

=== Finals ===
Semifinals
Jana Bitsch (GER)	2
Anzhelika Terliuga (UKR)	8
Ivet Goranova (BUL)	0
Jennifer Warling (LUX)	0

Final
Anzhelika Terliuga (UKR)	3
Ivet Goranova (BUL)	4
