= 2026 European Karate Championships – Women's 55 kg =

Women's 55 kg at the 2026 European Karate Championships
- Venue: Eissporthalle Frankfurt
- Location: Frankfurt, Germany
- Dates: 21, 23 May
- Competitors: 31 from 31 nations

Medalists
gold medal	Madina Sadigova	Azerbaijan
silver medal	Zümra Rezzan İm	Turkey
bronze medal	Nejra Sipović	Bosnia and Herzegovina
bronze medal	Mia Bitsch	Germany

The women's 55 kg competition at the 2026 European Karate Championships was held on 21 and 23 May 2026.

== Results ==
=== Finals ===
Semifinals
(Bosnia and Herzegovina) Nejra Sipović	4
(Azerbaijan) Madina Sadigova	5
(Turkey) Zümra Rezzan İm	4
(Ukraine) Anzhelika Terliuga	3

Final
(Azerbaijan) Madina Sadigova	9
(Turkey) Zümra Rezzan İm	6

=== Repechage ===
Repechage 1
(England) Adela Giurma-Handley	1
(Poland) Kseniya Dronchanka	2

Repechage 2
(Poland) Kseniya Dronchanka	3
(Italy) Viola Lallo	2

Bronze medal
(Poland) Kseniya Dronchanka	0
(Bosnia and Herzegovina) Nejra Sipović	8

Repechage 1
(Montenegro) Helena Backović	0
(Germany) Mia Bitsch	3

Repechage 2
(Germany) Mia Bitsch	4
(Serbia) Tamara Grčić	2

Bronze medal
(Germany) Mia Bitsch	7
(Ukraine) Anzhelika Terliuga	3

=== Top half ===
==== Section 1 ====
Round of 32
(Switzerland) Kim Lara Streit	1
(Greece) Maria-Antonia Zamantza	1
(Sweden) Matilda Rosenlind	2
(Cyprus) Maria Kyprianou	1
(Romania) Lorelley Andrei	2
(Hungary) Panka Török	2
(Spain) Ruth Lorenzo	0
(Bosnia and Herzegovina) Nejra Sipović	1

Round of 16
(Switzerland) Kim Lara Streit	4
(Sweden) Matilda Rosenlind	4
(Hungary) Panka Török	2
(Bosnia and Herzegovina) Nejra Sipović	4

Quarterfinals
(Switzerland) Kim Lara Streit	0
(Bosnia and Herzegovina) Nejra Sipović	2

==== Section 2 ====
Round of 32
(Poland) Kseniya Dronchanka	2
(Netherlands) Alyssia Voorduin	0
(England) Adela Giurma-Handley	1
(Azerbaijan) Madina Sadigova	9
(France) Sylia Abdesselem	2
(Luxembourg) Jennifer Warling	3
(Italy) Viola Lallo	3
(Slovakia) Nina Kvasnicová	0

Round of 16
(Poland) Kseniya Dronchanka	0
(Azerbaijan) Madina Sadigova	2
(Luxembourg) Jennifer Warling	1
(Italy) Viola Lallo	7

Quarterfinals
(Azerbaijan) Madina Sadigova	8
(Italy) Viola Lallo	4

=== Bottom half ===
==== Section 3 ====
Round of 32
(Slovenia) Lara Daković	1
(Serbia) Tamara Grčić	3
(Israel) Rotem Efroni	1
(North Macedonia) Mihaela Mishovska	3
(Germany) Mia Bitsch	5
Sofiia Liaskalo	2
(Montenegro) Helena Backović	0
(Turkey) Zümra Rezzan İm	1

Round of 16
(Serbia) Tamara Grčić	8
(North Macedonia) Mihaela Mishovska	0
(Germany) Mia Bitsch	5
(Turkey) Zümra Rezzan İm	7

Quarterfinals
(Serbia) Tamara Grčić	0
(Turkey) Zümra Rezzan İm	1

==== Section 4 ====
Round of 32
(Kosovo) Qendresa Ibrahimi	1
(Georgia (country)) Lizi Zviadauri	4
(Latvia) Marija Luīze Muižniece	1
(Lithuania) Miglė Liutkevičiūtė	1
(Croatia) Katja Jurković	0
(Portugal) Marta Guimarães	0

Round of 16
(Georgia (country)) Lizi Zviadauri	2
(Latvia) Marija Luīze Muižniece	0
(Croatia) Katja Jurković	2
(Ukraine) Anzhelika Terliuga	3

Quarterfinals
(Georgia (country)) Lizi Zviadauri	0
(Ukraine) Anzhelika Terliuga	2
