= Karate at the 2020 Summer Olympics =

Karate at the Games of the XXXII Olympiad
- Pictograms for kata (left) and kumite (right)
- Venue: Nippon Budokan
- Dates: 5–7 August 2021
- No. of events: 8
- Competitors: 82 from 36 countries (including 2 EOR athletes)

Karate was an event held in the 2020 Summer Olympics in Tokyo, Japan. It was the debut appearance of karate at the Summer Olympics. Karate was one of four optional sports added to the Olympic program specifically for 2020, rather than as a permanent sport. After it was announced it would not be included in 2024, in August 2022 it was announced that karate had made the shortlist for inclusion in the 2028 Games, although it was ultimately not selected.

The karate competitions at the 2020 Olympics featured eight events. Two karate disciplines were featured: kumite was the sparring discipline and had three weight classes each for men and women; kata was the solo form discipline, and had one event each for men and women. Competitors chose the kata to demonstrate from 102 kata that were recognized by the World Karate Federation. Competitors were not allowed to demonstrate the same kata twice during the tournament. Each event had 10 competitors.

The three weight classes in Olympic competition for kumite were in contrast to the five normally used by the World Karate Federation (WKF). The two lightest (-60 kg and -67 kg for men, -50 kg and -55 kg for women) were combined into the Olympic categories of -67 kg for men and -55 kg for women. The middle categories (-75 kg men, -61 kg women) were unchanged, while the two heaviest categories (-84 kg and +84 kg for men, -68 kg and +68 kg for women) were combined into +75 kg for men and +61 kg for women.

== Background ==
The effort to bring karate to the Olympics was begun in the 1970s by Jacques Delcourt. In 2009, in the 121st International Olympic Committee voting, karate did not receive the necessary two-thirds majority vote to become an Olympic sport. Karate was being considered for the 2020 Olympics; however, at a meeting of the IOC's executive board, held in Russia on 29 May 2013, it was decided that karate (along with wushu and several other sports) would not be considered for inclusion in 2020 at the IOC's 125th session in Buenos Aires, Argentina, in September 2013.

In September 2015, karate was included in a shortlist with baseball, softball, skateboarding, surfing, and sport climbing to be considered for inclusion in the 2020 Summer Olympics, and in June 2016, the Executive Board of the International Olympic Committee (IOC) announced that they would support the proposal to include all of the shortlisted sports in the 2020 Games. Finally, on 3 August 2016, all five sports (counting baseball and softball together as one sport) were approved for inclusion in the 2020 Olympic program. Karate will not be included in the 2024 Olympic Games or the 2028 Games.

== Rules ==
For both kumite and kata, WKF rules, effective as of January 2018, have been adopted. In January 2019, a point-based system was adopted for kata.

=== Kumite ===
The individual tournament for the Kumite competition at the World Karate Federation (WKF) Karate World Championships is held under a weight class system comprising five divisions each for both men and women. However, the Kumite competition at the Summer Olympics consisted of just three divisions each, thus:

- Weight classes for men: −67 kg, −75 kg, +75 kg
- Weight classes for women: −55 kg, −61 kg, +61 kg

Two competitors face each other in a matted competition area of 8 m × 8 m (26 ft × 26 ft). Each match is competed for 3 minutes, unless one competitor amasses eight points more than their opponent. A competitor wins by amassing eight points more than their opponent or by gaining more points than their opponent in the allotted time of 3 minutes. In the event of a tie, the competitor who scored the first point is the winner. In the case of a scoreless bout, the winner will be declared by decision of the five judges.

Points were earned as follows:

- Ippon (3 points): for hitting the head of the opponent with a kick, or when any technique is applied to a fallen adversary.
- Waza-ari (2 points): for applying a kick to the belly, side, back or torso of the opponent.
- Yuko (1 point): for delivering a punch with closed hand (tsuki) or strike (uchi) to the head, neck, belly, side, back or torso of the opponent.

Strikes below the belt were strictly forbidden and strength must always be controlled as the fighter would receive a warning if they hurt their opponent. Points could be lost or there could even be a disqualification if the resulting injury was severe. Knocking an opponent down to the floor without at least attempting to strike them was also liable to be punished.

Warning levels:

- Chukoku (first warning): for committing a minor infraction for the first time.
- Keikoku (second warning): for the same minor infraction, or for committing a medium infraction for the first time.
- Hansoku-chui (third warning): for committing the same minor infraction for the third time, the same medium infraction for a second time, or for committing a major infraction for the first time (usually excessive contact to vital parts or below the belt, really hurting the opponent).
- Hansoku (fourth and final warning): inflicting serious damage on the team score as a whole. The victory is given to the opponent.

Warnings and punishments were divided into two different categories, the first being for excessive and/or illegal contact and the other for technical violations, such as leaving the koto (fighting space) or faking an injury in order to make the referee give the opponent a warning.

=== Kata ===
Each of seven judges evaluates the performance individually within the scale of 5.0 to 10.0, in increments of 0.2 for technical points and athletic points respectively. The two highest and two lowest scores out of the seven scores of each group are eliminated and all the remaining scores are added to make up the final scores, which is weighed 70% for technical points and 30% for athletic points. In the case of a draw, the competitors perform an additional choice of kata to be judged.

There are 7 criteria of evaluation for technical points: stances, techniques, transitional movements, timing, correct breathing, focus and conformance. 3 evaluation criteria for athletic points are: strength, speed and balance.

== Qualification ==
There are 80 qualifying spots for karate at the 2020 Summer Olympics.

A nation can have no more than 8 athletes qualify (up to four males and four females) with a maximum of one in each event.

=== Summary ===
The 10 competitors in each event qualify as follows:

- 1 from the host nation, Japan
- 4 from the Olympic Standing ranking as of 5 April 2021
- 3 from the Olympics Karate 2020 Qualification Tournament
- 2 from continental representation or Tripartite Commission invitation

Because World Karate Federation rankings are based on five weight classes instead of the three weight classes featured in the 2020 Olympics, some of the Olympic events are based on a combination of two WKF classes. In those cases, the top 2 from each of the WKF classes qualify for the combined Olympic class (for a total of 4). Where the Olympic class matches the WKF class, the top 4 in that class qualify.

The qualification tournament features the same weight classes as the Olympic weight classes. Only National Olympic Committees (NOCs) that have not qualified through Olympic standing for a given division are eligible to enter an athlete in the qualification tournament. The top three finishers in each division at the qualification tournament qualify for the Olympics.

A total of 10 quota places, distributed among the eight events, are available through continental representation. The selection order is as follows:

Continent	Spots	
Oceania	2	1 per gender
Africa	2	1 per gender
North America	2	1 per gender
Asia	2	1 per gender
Europe	2	1 per gender
Africa	1	either gender
South America	1	either gender

For each continent, all of the gold medalists at the continental games are considered together. The highest ranked among this group earns the qualification spot unless that competitor is already qualified or otherwise cannot be selected without violating any of the following limitations: 10 athletes per division, 1 athlete per NOC per division, 2 athletes per NOC through continental representation (affecting only Africa and the Americas). If the highest-ranked gold medalist cannot be entered, then the next-highest ranked gold medalist qualifies if possible. This process goes through all gold medalists by ranking, then all silver medalists by ranking, then all bronze medalists by ranking until the continent's qualifying spots are filled. If none of the medalists can be entered, the highest-ranked eligible athlete from that continent in the rankings (regardless of finish at the continental games) qualifies.

== Participating nations ==
List of countries competing in Karate.

- Algeria (1)
- Australia (1)
- Austria (1)
- Azerbaijan (3)
- Bulgaria (1)
- Canada (1)
- China (2)
- Croatia (1)
- Egypt (5)
- France (3)
- Georgia (1)
- Germany (4)
- Hong Kong (1)
- Hungary (1)
- Iran (3)
- Italy (5)
- Japan (8)
- Jordan (1)
- Kazakhstan (5)
- Kuwait (1)
- Latvia (1)
- Morocco (1)
- New Zealand (1)
- North Macedonia (1)
- Peru (1)
- Refugee Olympic Team (2)
- ROC (1)
- Saudi Arabia (1)
- Serbia (1)
- South Korea (1)
- Spain (2)
- Switzerland (1)
- Chinese Taipei (2)
- Turkey (7)
- Ukraine (3)
- United States (4)
- Venezuela (3)

== Schedule ==
Schedule
Event↓/Date →	Aug 5	Aug 6	Aug 7
Men's 67kg	F		
Men's 75kg		F	
Men's +75kg			F
Men's kata		F	
Women's 55kg	F		
Women's 61kg		F	
Women's +61kg			F
Women's kata	F		

== Medalists ==
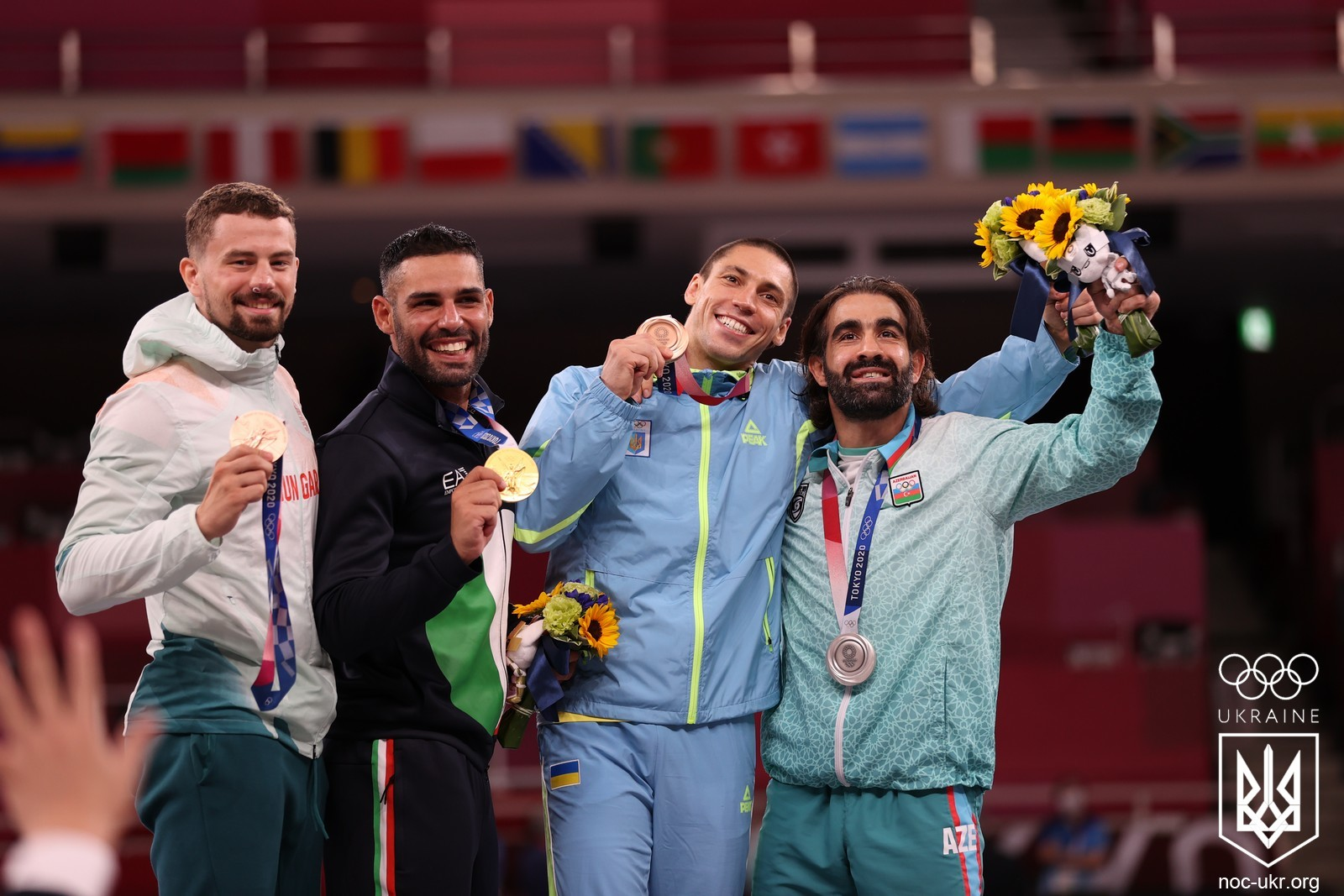
Karate 75 kg awarding ceremony

=== Medal table ===
* Host nation (Japan)

Rank	NOC	Gold	Silver	Bronze	Total
1	Japan*	1	1	1	3
2	Spain	1	1	0	2
3	Egypt	1	0	1	2
3	Italy	1	0	1	2
5	Bulgaria	1	0	0	1
5	France	1	0	0	1
5	Iran	1	0	0	1
5	Serbia	1	0	0	1
9	Azerbaijan	0	2	0	2
10	Turkey	0	1	3	4
11	China	0	1	1	2
11	Ukraine	0	1	1	2
13	Saudi Arabia	0	1	0	1
14	Kazakhstan	0	0	2	2
15	Austria	0	0	1	1
15	Chinese Taipei	0	0	1	1
15	Hong Kong	0	0	1	1
15	Hungary	0	0	1	1
15	Jordan	0	0	1	1
15	United States	0	0	1	1
Totals (20 entries)		8	8	16	32

=== Men ===
Event	Gold	Silver	Bronze
Kata	Ryo Kiyuna; Japan	Damián Quintero; Spain	Ariel Torres; United States
Kata	Ryo Kiyuna; Japan	Damián Quintero; Spain	Ali Sofuoğlu; Turkey
67 kg	Steven Da Costa; France	Eray Şamdan; Turkey	Darkhan Assadilov; Kazakhstan
67 kg	Steven Da Costa; France	Eray Şamdan; Turkey	Abdelrahman Al-Masatfa; Jordan
75 kg	Luigi Busà; Italy	Rafael Aghayev; Azerbaijan	Gábor Hárspataki; Hungary
75 kg	Luigi Busà; Italy	Rafael Aghayev; Azerbaijan	Stanislav Horuna; Ukraine
+75 kg	Sajjad Ganjzadeh; Iran	Tareg Hamedi; Saudi Arabia	Ryutaro Araga; Japan
+75 kg	Sajjad Ganjzadeh; Iran	Tareg Hamedi; Saudi Arabia	Uğur Aktaş; Turkey

=== Women ===
Event	Gold	Silver	Bronze
Kata	Sandra Sánchez; Spain	Kiyou Shimizu; Japan	Grace Lau; Hong Kong
Kata	Sandra Sánchez; Spain	Kiyou Shimizu; Japan	Viviana Bottaro; Italy
55 kg	Ivet Goranova; Bulgaria	Anzhelika Terliuga; Ukraine	Bettina Plank; Austria
55 kg	Ivet Goranova; Bulgaria	Anzhelika Terliuga; Ukraine	Wen Tzu-yun; Chinese Taipei
61 kg	Jovana Preković; Serbia	Yin Xiaoyan; China	Giana Farouk; Egypt
61 kg	Jovana Preković; Serbia	Yin Xiaoyan; China	Merve Çoban; Turkey
+61 kg	Feryal Abdelaziz; Egypt	Irina Zaretska; Azerbaijan	Gong Li; China
+61 kg	Feryal Abdelaziz; Egypt	Irina Zaretska; Azerbaijan	Sofya Berultseva; Kazakhstan

== See also ==
- List of Olympic medalists in karate
- Karate at the 2018 Asian Games
- Karate at the 2018 Summer Youth Olympics
- Karate at the 2019 African Games
- Karate at the 2019 European Games
- Karate at the 2019 Pan American Games
- Karate at the World Games
