= Mia Bitsch =

German karateka (born 2004)

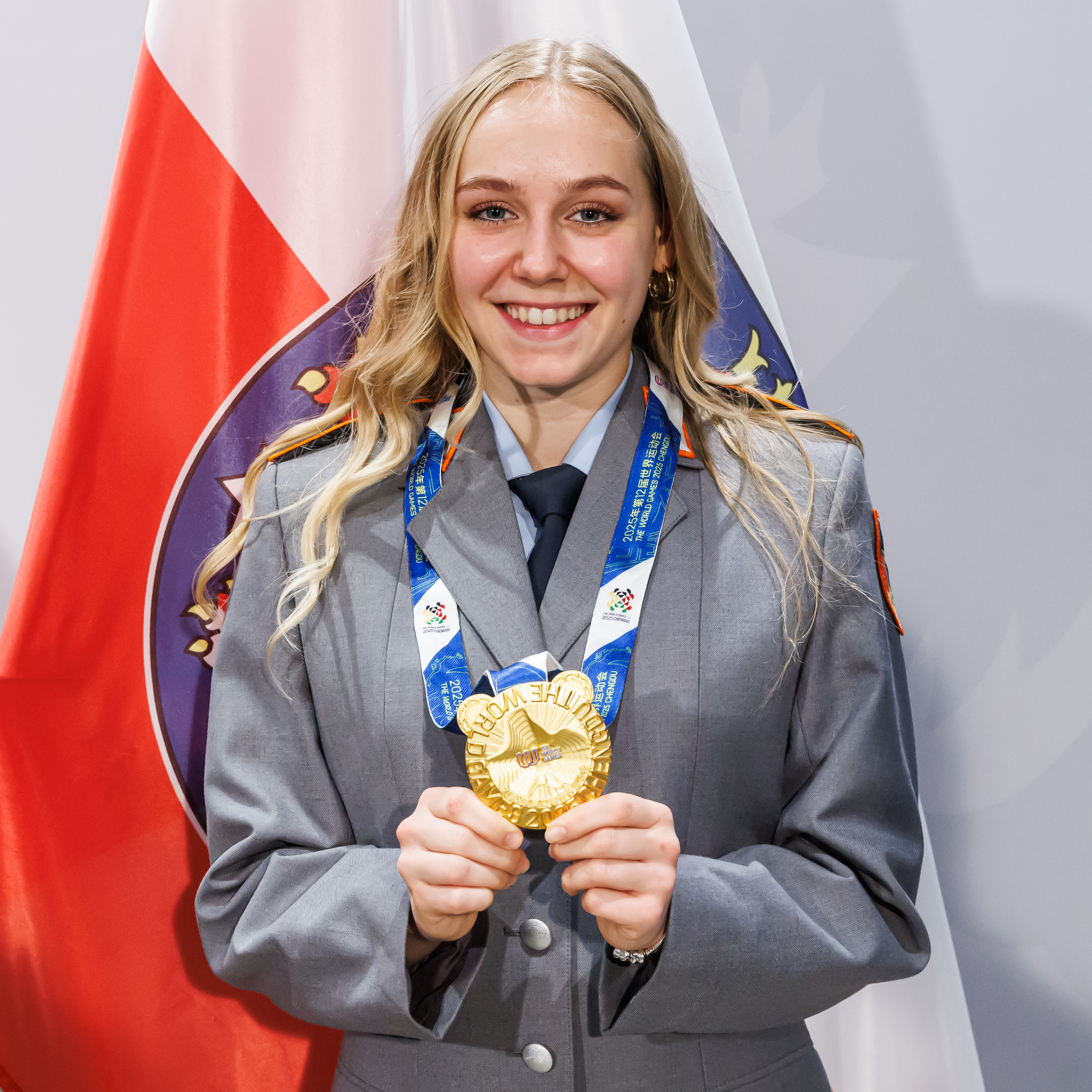
- 2025 with the gold medal at the World Games

Personal information
- Born: 12 January 2004 (age 22)

Sport
- Country: Germany
- Sport: Karate
- Weight class: 55 kg
- Events: Kumite; Team kumite
Medal record
Women's karate
Representing Germany
World Games
Gold medal – first place	2025 Chengdu	Kumite 55 kg
European Championships
Gold medal – first place	2024 Zadar	Kumite 55 kg
Gold medal – first place	2024 Zadar	Team kumite
Gold medal – first place	2025 Yerevan	Kumite 55 kg
Gold medal – first place	2025 Yerevan	Team kumite
Gold medal – first place	2026 Frankfurt	Team kumite
Bronze medal – third place	2026 Frankfurt	Kumite 55 kg

Mia Bitsch (born 12 January 2004) is a German karateka. She is a two-time gold medalist in the women's 55 kg event at the European Karate Championships (2024 and 2025). She is also a two-time gold medalist in the women's team kumite event.

Bitsch won the gold medal in the women's 55 kg event at the 2024 European Karate Championships held in Zadar, Croatia. She also won the gold medal in the women's 55 kg event at the 2025 European Karate Championships held in Yerevan, Armenia. She defeated Jennifer Warling of Luxembourg in her gold medal match.

Bitsch won the gold medal in the women's 55 kg event at the 2025 World Games held in Chengdu, China. She defeated Anzhelika Terliuga of Ukraine in her gold medal match.

== Personal life ==
Karateka Noah Bitsch is her brother. Karateka Jana Messerschmitt is her sister

== Achievements ==
Year	Competition	Location	Rank	Event
2024	European Championships	Zadar, Croatia	1st	Kumite 55 kg
2024	European Championships	Zadar, Croatia	1st	Team kumite
2025	European Championships	Yerevan, Armenia	1st	Kumite 55 kg
2025	European Championships	Yerevan, Armenia	1st	Team kumite
2025	World Games	Chengdu, China	1st	Kumite 55 kg
2026	European Championships	Frankfurt, Germany	3rd	Kumite 55 kg
2026	European Championships	Frankfurt, Germany	1st	Team kumite
