= Karate at the 2022 World Games – Women's kumite 55 kg =

Women's kumite 55 kg at the 2022 World Games
- Venue: Bill Battle Coliseum
- Location: Birmingham, United States
- Dates: 8 July
- Competitors: 8 from 8 nations

Medalists
gold medal	Anzhelika Terliuga	Ukraine
silver medal	Ahlam Youssef	Egypt
bronze medal	Trinity Allen	United States

The women's kumite 55 kg competition in karate at the 2022 World Games took place on 8 July 2022 at the Bill Battle Coliseum in Birmingham, United States.

== Results ==
=== Elimination round ===
==== Pool A ====
Pos	Athlete	B	W	D	L	Pts	Score	(Egypt)	(United States)	(Germany)	(Canada)
1	Ahlam Youssef (EGY)	3	2	1	0	5	15–3	—	0–0	6–2	9–1
2	Trinity Allen (USA)	3	2	1	0	5	9–1	0–0	—	1–0	8–1
3	Jana Messerschmidt (GER)	3	1	0	2	2	8–7	2–6	0–1	—	6–0
4	Kathryn Campbell (CAN)	3	0	0	3	0	2–23	1–9	1–8	0–6	—

Source: Birmingham 2022

==== Pool B ====
Pos	Athlete	B	W	D	L	Pts	Score	(Ukraine)	(Luxembourg)	(Bulgaria)	(Brazil)
1	Anzhelika Terliuga (UKR)	3	2	1	0	5	10–4	—	4–1	3–0	3–3
2	Jennifer Warling (LUX)	3	2	0	1	4	7–5	1–4	—	5–1	1–0
3	Ivet Goranova (BUL)	3	1	0	2	2	2–8	0–3	1–5	—	1–0
4	Valéria Kumizaki (BRA)	3	0	1	2	1	3–5	3–3	0–1	0–1	—

Source: Birmingham 2022

=== Finals ===
Semi-finals
Ahlam Youssef (EGY)	0
Jennifer Warling (LUX)	0
Anzhelika Terliuga (UKR)	8
Trinity Allen (USA)	1

Gold medal bout
Ahlam Youssef (EGY)	0
Anzhelika Terliuga (UKR)	1
Bronze medal bout
Jennifer Warling (LUX)	0
Trinity Allen (USA)	6
