= Karate at the 2023 European Games – Women's kumite 55 kg =

Women's kumite 55 kg at the 2023 European Games
- Venue: Bielsko-Biała Arena
- Date: 22 June
- Competitors: 8 from 8 nations

Medalists
gold medal	Anzhelika Terliuga	Ukraine
silver medal	Ivet Goranova	Bulgaria
bronze medal	Jennifer Warling	Luxembourg
bronze medal	Tuba Yakan	Turkey

The women's kumite 55 kg competition at the 2023 European Games was held on 22 June 2023 at the Bielsko-Biała Arena.

== Results ==
=== Elimination round ===
Pool A

Pos	Athlete	B	W	D	D^{0}	L	Pts	Score	(Ukraine)	(Turkey)	(Germany)	(Italy)
1	Anzhelika Terliuga (UKR)	3	2	0	1	0	6 (Note: Terliuga (UKR) 4–2 Yakan (TUR))	7–2	—	4–2	3–0	0–0
2	Tuba Yakan (TUR)	3	2	0	0	1	6	11–8	2–4	—	3–2	6–2
3	Gizem Bugur (GER)	3	0	1	0	2	1 (Note: Bugur (GER) 2–2 Brunori (ITA). Tied on scores obtained (4), scores got against (8), ippons in favour (0). Ippons against: Bugur 0, Brunori 2.)	4–8	0–3	2–3	—	2–2
4	Veronica Brunori (ITA)	3	0	1	1	1	1	4–8	0–0	2–6	2–2	—

Source: EG2023
Notes:

Pool B

Pos	Athlete	B	W	D	D^{0}	L	Pts	Score	(Bulgaria)	(Luxembourg)	(Azerbaijan)	(Poland)
1	Ivet Goranova (BUL)	3	2	0	1	0	6 (Note: Goranova (BUL) 0–0 Warling (LUX). Scores obtained: Goranova 12, Warling 8.)	12–1	—	0–0	3–1	9–0
2	Jennifer Warling (LUX)	3	2	0	1	0	6	8–4	0–0	—	3–2	5–2
3	Madina Sadigova (AZE)	3	1	0	0	2	3	6–6	1–3	2–3	—	3–0
4	Maria Kerner (POL)	3	0	0	0	3	0	2–17	0–9	2–5	0–3	—

Source: EG2023

=== Finals ===
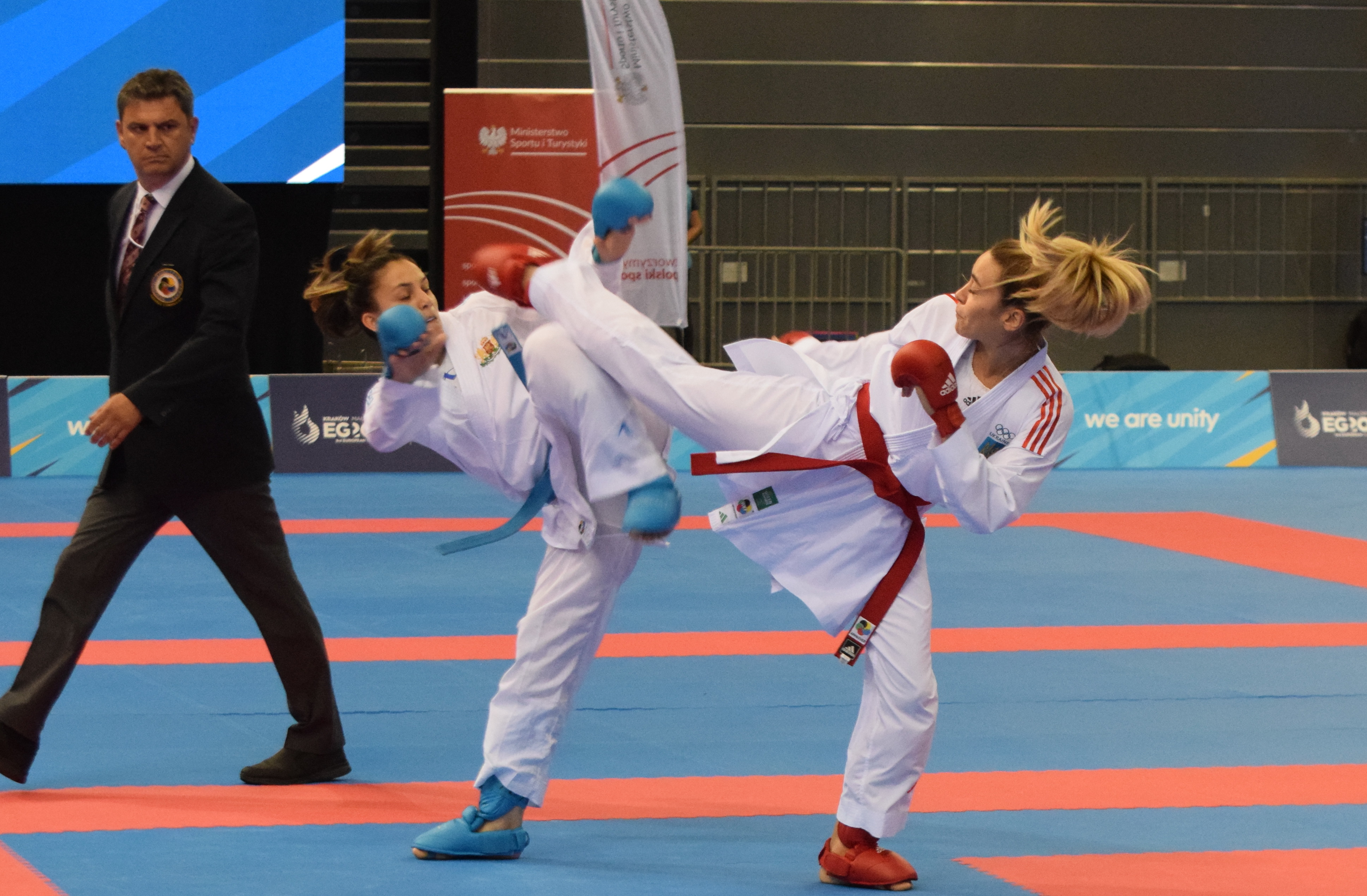
Final bout between Terliuga and Goranova at the 2023 European Games

Semifinals
Jennifer Warling (LUX)	0
Anzhelika Terliuga (UKR)	2
Tuba Yakan (TUR)	3
Ivet Goranova (BUL)	3

Gold medal bout
Anzhelika Terliuga (UKR)	2
Ivet Goranova (BUL)	0
