= Trinity Allen =

American karateka (born 2001)

Personal information
- National team: USA
- Born: February 22, 2001 (age 25) Monroe, Louisiana, U.S.
- Home town: Las Vegas, Nevada

Sport
- Country: United States
- Sport: Karate
- Weight class: 55 kg
- Event: Kumite
- Club: Hiro Karate
Medal record
Women's karate
Representing United States
World Championships
Silver medal – second place	2021 Dubai	Kumite 55 kg
World Games
Bronze medal – third place	2022 Birmingham	Kumite 55 kg
Junior Pan American Games
Gold medal – first place	2021 Cali-Valle	Kumite 55 kg
Pan American Championships
Gold medal – first place	2021 Punta del Este	Kumite 55 kg

Trinity Allen (born February 22, 2001) is an American karateka. She won the silver medal in the women's 55 kg event at the 2021 World Karate Championships held in Dubai, United Arab Emirates. In the semi-finals, she was injured by her opponent which left her unable to compete in the final and, as a result, she was awarded the silver medal. Two weeks later, she won the gold medal in her event at the 2021 Junior Pan American Games held in Cali, Colombia.

In October 2021, Allen won the gold medal in her event at the Pan American Senior Championships held in Punta del Este, Uruguay.

Allen won the bronze medal in the women's 55 kg event at the 2022 World Games held in Birmingham, United States. She was eliminated in her first match in the women's 55 kg event at the 2023 World Karate Championships held in Budapest, Hungary. Allen competed in the women's 55 kg event at the 2023 Pan American Games held in Santiago, Chile.

== Achievements ==
Year	Competition	Venue	Rank	Event
2021	World Championships	Dubai, United Arab Emirates	2nd	Kumite 55 kg
2022	World Games	Birmingham, United States	3rd	Kumite 55 kg
