= Ahlam Youssef =

Egyptian karateka (born 1999)

Personal information
- Born: 5 December 1999 (age 26)

Sport
- Country: Egypt
- Sport: Karate
- Weight class: 55 kg
- Events: Kumite; Team kumite
Medal record
Women's karate
Representing Egypt
World Games
Silver medal – second place	2022 Birmingham	Kumite 55 kg
World Championships
Gold medal – first place	2021 Dubai	Kumite 55 kg
Gold medal – first place	2025 Cairo	Kumite 55 kg
African Games
Gold medal – first place	2023 Accra	Team kumite
Silver medal – second place	2023 Accra	Kumite 55 kg
African Championships
Gold medal – first place	2021 Cairo	Kumite 55 kg
Gold medal – first place	2021 Cairo	Team kumite
Mediterranean Games
Silver medal – second place	2022 Oran	Kumite 55 kg

Ahlam Youssef (born 5 December 1999) is an Egyptian karateka.

== Career ==
She won the gold medal in the women's 55 kg event at the 2021 World Karate Championships held in Dubai, United Arab Emirates. She also won the gold medal in her event at the 2021 African Karate Championships held in Cairo, Egypt. She won the silver medal in the women's 55 kg event at the 2022 Mediterranean Games held in Oran, Algeria. She also won the silver medal in the women's 55 kg event at the 2022 World Games held in Birmingham, United States. In December 2022, she defeated Algeria's Louiza Abouriche in the women's under-55-kilogram final at the Olive Convention Centre in Durban winning the gold medal at the African Karate Championships in Durban defending her championship title. In 2023, she was eliminated in her first match in the women's 55 kg event at the World Karate Championships held in Budapest, Hungary. In 2023, the UFAK Karate Championships concluded in Casablanca, where she is among the top winners alongside Abdel Ali Jina and Youssef Badawy.

== Professional Statistics ==
- Events - 16
- Wins - 37
- Losses - 11
- Win rate - 75.51%
- Points scored/Against - 333 / 125
- Avg. scores/Bout - 6.8

== Achievements ==
Year	Competition	Venue	Rank	Event
2021	World Championships	Dubai, United Arab Emirates	1st	Kumite 55 kg
2021	African Championships	Cairo, Egypt	1st	Kumite 55 kg
2022	Mediterranean Games	Oran, Algeria	2nd	Kumite 55 kg
2022	World Games	Birmingham, United States	2nd	Kumite 55 kg
2024	African Games	Accra, Ghana	2nd	Kumite 55 kg
2024	African Games	Accra, Ghana	1st	Team kumite
