= Wen Tzu-yun =

Taiwanese karateka (born 1993)

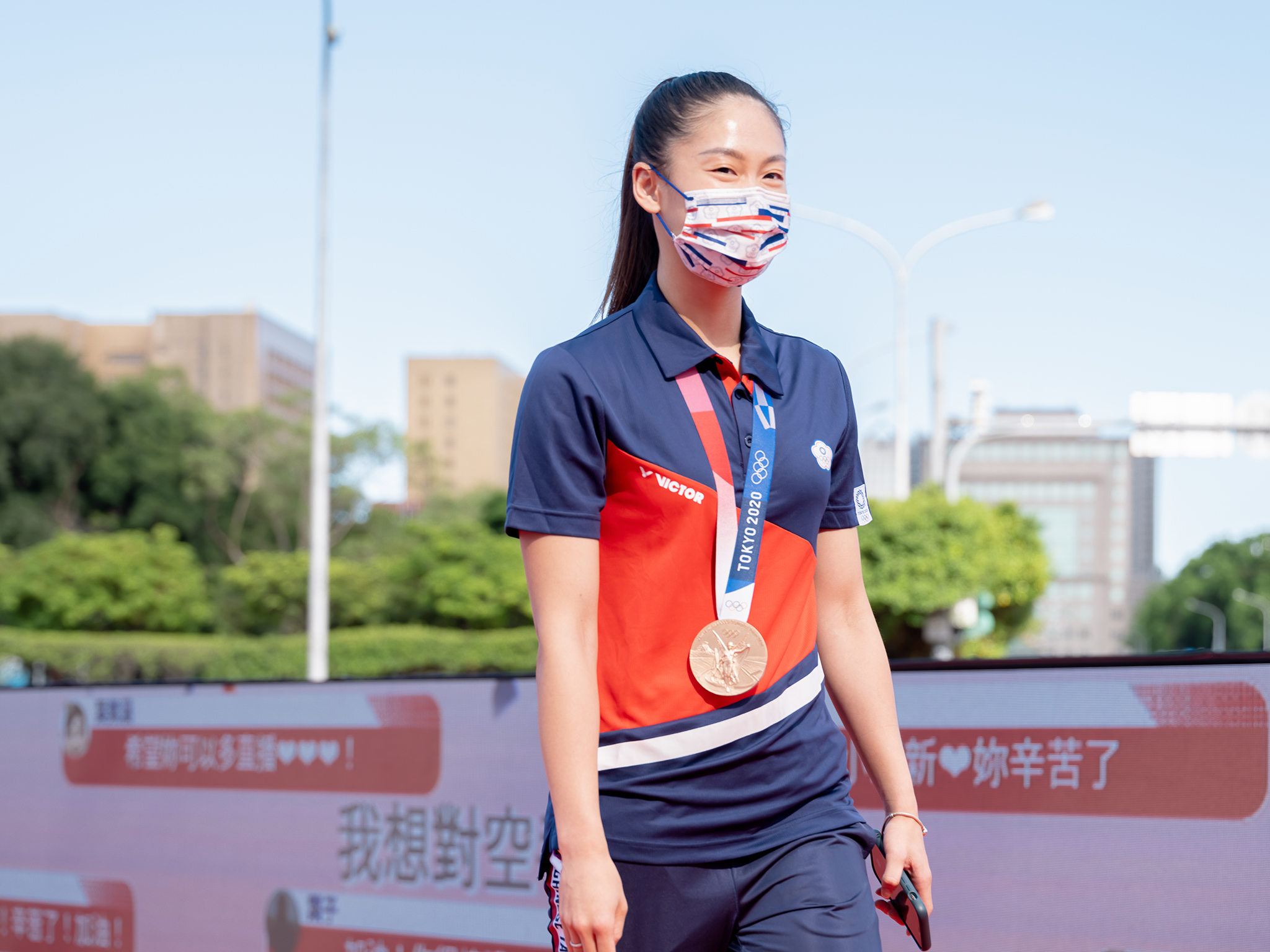

Personal information
- Born: 29 September 1993 (age 32) Taipei, Taiwan

Sport
- Country: Taiwan
- Sport: Karate
- Weight class: 55 kg
- Events: Kumite; Team kumite
Medal record
Women's karate
Representing Chinese Taipei
Olympic Games
Bronze medal – third place	2020 Tokyo	Kumite 55 kg
World Championships
Bronze medal – third place	2016 Linz	Kumite 55 kg
Bronze medal – third place	2018 Madrid	Kumite 55 kg
Asian Games
Gold medal – first place	2014 Incheon	Kumite 55 kg
Gold medal – first place	2018 Jakarta	Kumite 55 kg
Asian Karate Championships
Gold medal – first place	2015 Yokohama	Kumite 55 kg
Gold medal – first place	2017 Astana	Kumite 55 kg
Gold medal – first place	2018 Amman	Kumite 55 kg
Silver medal – second place	2013 Dubai	Kumite 55 kg
Silver medal – second place	2017 Astana	Team kumite
Bronze medal – third place	2013 Dubai	Team kumite
World Games
Silver medal – second place	2017 Wrocław	Kumite 55 kg

Wen Tzu-yun (Chinese: 文姿云; pinyin: Wén Zīyún, born 29 September 1993) is a Taiwanese karateka. At the 2020 Summer Olympics in Tokyo, Japan, she won one of the bronze medals in the women's 55 kg event. Wen is also a two-time gold medalist in the women's kumite 55 kg event at the Asian Games and a two-time bronze medalist in this event at the World Karate Championships.

== Career ==
Wen won the gold medal in the women's 55 kg event at the Asian Games both in 2014 and in 2018. She won one of the bronze medals in her event at the 2016 World University Karate Championships held in Braga, Portugal. She also won the silver medal in the women's team kumite event.

At the 2017 World Games held in Wrocław, Poland, Wen won the silver medal in the women's kumite 55 kg event. In the final, she lost against Valéria Kumizaki of Brazil.

Wen represented Chinese Taipei at the 2020 Summer Olympics in Tokyo, Japan in karate. She won one of the bronze medals in the women's 55 kg event. In her semifinal, she lost against eventual silver medalist Anzhelika Terliuga of Ukraine. In November 2021, Wen competed in the women's 55 kg event at the World Karate Championships held in Dubai, United Arab Emirates.

== Achievements ==
Year	Competition	Venue	Rank	Event
2013	Asian Championships	Dubai, United Arab Emirates	2nd	Kumite 55 kg
2013	Asian Championships	Dubai, United Arab Emirates	3rd	Team kumite
2014	Asian Games	Incheon, South Korea	1st	Kumite 55 kg
2015	Asian Championships	Yokohama, Japan	1st	Kumite 55 kg
2016	World Championships	Linz, Austria	3rd	Kumite 55 kg
2017	Asian Championships	Astana, Kazakhstan	1st	Kumite 55 kg
2017	Asian Championships	Astana, Kazakhstan	2nd	Team kumite
2017	World Games	Wrocław, Poland	2nd	Kumite 55 kg
2018	Asian Championships	Amman, Jordan	1st	Kumite 55 kg
2018	Asian Games	Jakarta, Indonesia	1st	Kumite 55 kg
2018	World Championships	Madrid, Spain	3rd	Kumite 55 kg
2021	Summer Olympics	Tokyo, Japan	3rd	Kumite 55 kg
