= Jana Messerschmidt =

German karateka

Personal information
- Full name: Jana Messerschmidt
- Born: Jana Bitsch; 1 December 1990 (age 35)

Sport
- Country: Germany
- Sport: Karate
- Weight class: 55 kg
Medal record
Women's karate
Representing Germany
World Championships
Silver medal – second place	2018 Madrid	Kumite 55 kg
Bronze medal – third place	2014 Bremen	Kumite 55 kg
European Games
Bronze medal – third place	2019 Minsk	Kumite 55 kg
European Championships
Gold medal – first place	2021 Porec	Team kumite
Silver medal – second place	2012 Adeje	Kumite 55 kg
Silver medal – second place	2021 Porec	Kumite 55 kg
Bronze medal – third place	2012 Adeje	Team kumite
Bronze medal – third place	2019 Guadalajara	Team kumite

Jana Messerschmidt (née Bitsch) is a German karateka. In 2019, she won one of the bronze medals in the women's kumite 55 kg event at the 2019 European Games held in Minsk, Belarus. In 2018, she won the silver medal in the women's kumite 55 kg event at the 2018 World Karate Championships held in Madrid. Her brother Noah Bitsch, is one of the best athletes in men's kumite 75 kg. She also has a younger sister. Mia Bitsch is No.1 in the world ranking 14-15years -53 kg.

She competed in the women's kumite 55 kg at the 2022 World Games held in Birmingham, United States.

== Achievements ==
Year	Competition	Venue	Rank	Event
2012	European Championship	Adeje, Spain	2nd	Kumite 55 kg
2012	European Championship	Adeje, Spain	3rd	Kumite team
2014	World Championships	Bremen, Germany	3rd	Kumite 55 kg
2018	World Championships	Madrid, Spain	2nd	Kumite 55 kg
2019	European Championship	Guadalajara, Spain	3rd	Kumite team
2019	European Games	Minsk, Belarus	3rd	Kumite 55 kg
2021	European Championships	Poreč, Croatia	2nd	Kumite 55 kg
2021	European Championships	Poreč, Croatia	1st	Team kumite
