= Sevinch Rakhimova =

Uzbekistani karateka

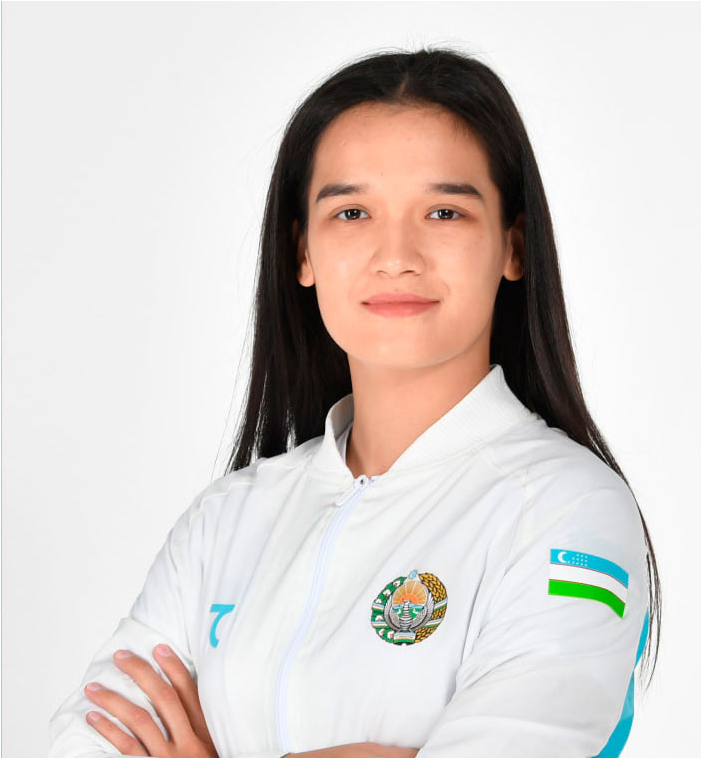

Sport
- Country: Uzbekistan
- Sport: Karate
- Weight class: 55 kg
- Event: Kumite
Medal record
Women's karate
Representing Uzbekistan
Asian Games
| Gold medal – first place | 2022 Hangzhou | Kumite 55 kg |
Islamic Solidarity Games
| Gold medal – first place | 2025 Riyadh | Kumite 55 kg |
| Bronze medal – third place | 2021 Konya | Kumite 55 kg |
Asian Championships
| Silver medal – second place | 2019 Tashkent | Kumite 55 kg |

Sevinch Rakhimova (born 1999, Uzbekistan) is an Uzbek karate athlete who competes in the under 55 kg weight category and is a member of the Uzbekistan national team. In 2019, she won a silver medal at the Asian Karate Championship and a bronze medal at the Islamic Solidarity Games. She is also a champion of the Asian Games.

== Biography ==
In her childhood, Sevinch started practicing artistic gymnastics and boxing, but from 2013, she switched to karate under the guidance of coach Sulaymon Yusupov.

In 2019, she won a silver medal at the Asian Karate Championship for women in the under 55 kg weight category in Tashkent.

In 2021, Sevinch Rahimova participated in an Olympic qualification tournament in Paris, France, to secure a spot in the Summer Olympics in Tokyo, Japan. However, she was defeated in the 1/64 finals by Russian athlete Naila Gataullina. In the same year, she also participated in the Karate World Championship in Dubai, UAE, but suffered a defeat in the match for the bronze medal in the under 55 kg weight category against Russian athlete Anna Chernysheva. She also lost in the match for the bronze medal at the Asian Karate Championship.

In 2022, at the Islamic Solidarity Games in Konya, Turkey, Sevinch Rahimova won a bronze medal among women in the under 55 kg weight category, defeating an Indonesian athlete in the match.

In August 2023, at the II Games of the Commonwealth of Independent States (CIS) in Minsk, Belarus, she secured a gold medal in the under 55 kg weight category. In October of the same year, at the Summer Asian Games in Hangzhou, China, in kumite competitions in the under 55 kg weight category, she defeated a competitor from Chinese Taipei, Sui-Ping Ku, in the final, thus winning the gold medal of the Asian Games.

== Achievements ==
| Year | Competition | Venue | Rank | Event |
|---|---|---|---|---|
| 2019 | Asian Championships | Tashkent, Uzbekistan | 2nd | Kumite 55 kg |
| 2022 | Islamic Solidarity Games | Konya, Turkey | 3rd | Kumite 55 kg |
| 2023 | Asian Games | Hangzhou, China | 1st | Kumite 55 kg |
