= Ivet Goranova =

Bulgarian karateka (born 2000)

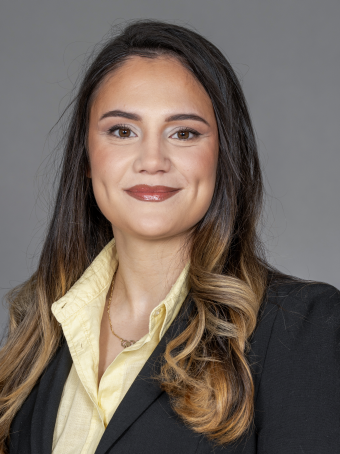
- Goranova as member of the National Assembly of Bulgaria

Personal information
- Native name: Ивет Горанова
- Born: 6 March 2000 (age 26) Dolna Mitropoliya, Pleven Province, Bulgaria

Sport
- Country: Bulgaria
- Sport: Karate
- Weight class: 55 kg
- Event: Kumite
Medal record
Women's karate
Representing Bulgaria
Summer Olympics
| Gold medal – first place | 2020 Tokyo | Kumite 55 kg |
World Championships
| Silver medal – second place | 2023 Budapest | Kumite 55 kg |
| Bronze medal – third place | 2018 Madrid | Kumite 55 kg |
| Bronze medal – third place | 2021 Dubai | Kumite 55 kg |
European Games
| Gold medal – first place | 2019 Minsk | Kumite 55 kg |
| Silver medal – second place | 2023 Kraków-Małopolska | Kumite 55 kg |
European Championships
| Silver medal – second place | 2022 Gaziantep | Kumite 55 kg |
| Bronze medal – third place | 2019 Guadalajara | Kumite 55 kg |
| Bronze medal – third place | 2025 Yerevan | Kumite 55 kg |

Ivet Goranova (Bulgarian: Ивет Горанова, born 6 March 2000) is a Bulgarian karateka. She won the gold medal in the women's 55 kg event at the 2020 Summer Olympics in Tokyo, Japan. She also won the gold medal in her event at the 2019 European Games held in Minsk, Belarus.

== Career ==
In 2018, Goranova won one of the bronze medals in the women's kumite 55 kg event at the World Karate Championships held in Madrid, Spain. In 2019, she won one of the bronze medals in the women's kumite 55 kg event at the European Karate Championships held in Guadalajara, Spain. In that same year, Goranova won the gold medal in the women's kumite 55 kg event at the European Games held in Minsk, Belarus. In the final, she defeated Anzhelika Terliuga of Ukraine.

Goranova qualified at the World Olympic Qualification Tournament in Paris, France to represent Bulgaria at the 2020 Summer Olympics in Tokyo, Japan. She won the gold medal in the women's 55 kg event. In November 2021, Goranova won one of the bronze medals in the women's 55 kg event at the World Karate Championships held in Dubai, United Arab Emirates.

Goranova competed in the women's kumite 55 kg at the 2022 World Games held in Birmingham, United States. She won the silver medal in the women's 55 kg event at the 2023 European Games held in Poland. In the final, she lost against Anzhelika Terliuga of Ukraine. A few months later, Goranova won the silver medal in the women's 55 kg event at the 2023 World Karate Championships held in Budapest, Hungary.

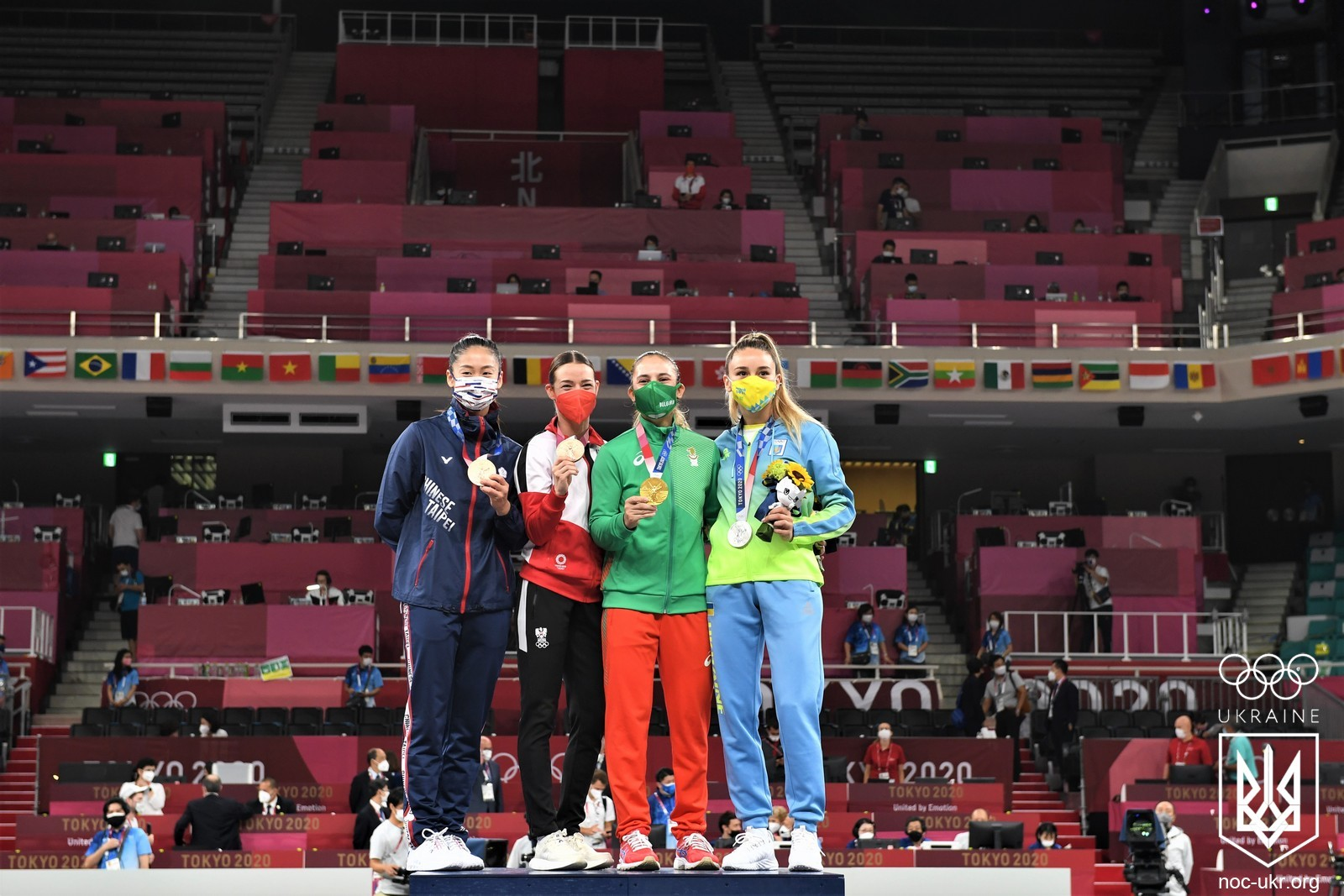

== Achievements ==
| Year | Competition | Venue | Rank | Event |
|---|---|---|---|---|
| 2018 | World Championships | Madrid, Spain | 3rd | Kumite 55 kg |
| 2019 | European Championships | Guadalajara, Spain | 3rd | Kumite 55 kg |
| 2019 | European Games | Minsk, Belarus | 1st | Kumite 55 kg |
| 2021 | Summer Olympics | Tokyo, Japan | 1st | Kumite 55 kg |
| 2021 | World Championships | Dubai, United Arab Emirates | 3rd | Kumite 55 kg |
| 2022 | European Championships | Gaziantep, Turkey | 2nd | Kumite 55 kg |
| 2023 | European Games | Kraków and Małopolska, Poland | 2nd | Kumite 55 kg |
| 2023 | World Championships | Budapest, Hungary | 2nd | Kumite 55 kg |
| 2025 | European Championships | Yerevan, Armenia | 3rd | Kumite 55 kg |

== Honours ==
- Bulgarian Sportsperson of the Year (2021)
