= Karate at the 2020 Summer Olympics – Women's 55 kg =

Karate competition

Women's kumite 55 kg at the Games of the XXXII Olympiad
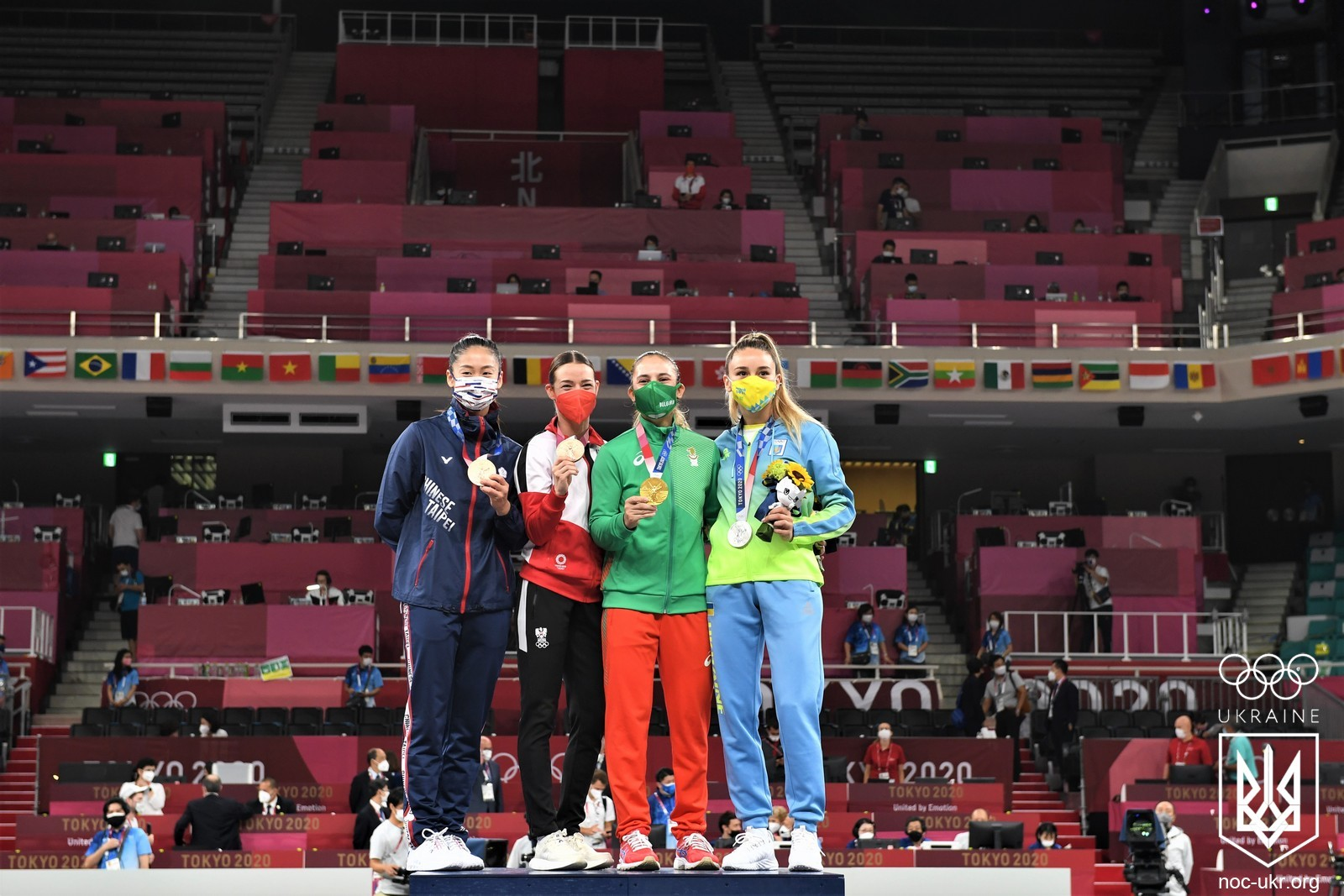
- Venue: Nippon Budokan
- Date: 5 August 2021
- Competitors: 9 from 9 nations

Medalists
| 1st place, gold medalist(s) | | Ivet Goranova | Bulgaria |
| 2nd place, silver medalist(s) | | Anzhelika Terliuga | Ukraine |
| 3rd place, bronze medalist(s) | | Bettina Plank | Austria |
| 3rd place, bronze medalist(s) | | Wen Tzu-yun | Chinese Taipei |

The women's kumite 55 kg competition in Karate at the 2020 Summer Olympics was held on 5 August 2021 at the Nippon Budokan.

== Competition format ==
The competition began with a two-pool round-robin stage followed by a single elimination stage. Each pool consisted of 4 or 5 athletes, with those positioned 1st and 4th seeded to Pool A, and those positioned 2nd and 3rd to Pool B. The athlete that finished first in Pool A faced the athlete that finished second in Pool B in the semifinals, and vice versa. There were no bronze medal matches in the kumite events. Losers of the semifinals each received a bronze medal.

== Schedule ==
All times are in local time (UTC+9).

| Date | Time | Round |
|---|---|---|
| Thursday, 5 August 2021 | 17:00; 20:22; 20:50; 21:00 | Pool stage Semifinals; Gold medal match Victory ceremony |

== Results ==
=== Pool stage ===
Pool A

| Pos | Athlete | B | W | D | L | Pts | Score | (Bulgaria) | (Chinese Taipei) | (Iran) | (Turkey) |
|---|---|---|---|---|---|---|---|---|---|---|---|
| 1 | Ivet Goranova (BUL) | 3 | 3 | 0 | 0 | 6 | 15–5 | — | 5–2 | 5–2 | 5–1 |
| 2 | Wen Tzu-yun (TPE) | 3 | 2 | 0 | 1 | 4 | 12–10 | 2–5 | — | 5–1 | 5–4 |
| 3 | Sara Bahmanyar (IRI) | 3 | 1 | 0 | 2 | 2 | 8–14 | 2–5 | 1–5 | — | 5–4 |
| 4 | Serap Özçelik (TUR) | 3 | 0 | 0 | 3 | 0 | 9–15 | 1–5 | 4–5 | 4–5 | — |

Source: Tokyo 2020

Pool B

| Pos | Athlete | B | W | D | L | Pts | Score | (Ukraine) | (Austria) | (Japan) | (Kazakhstan) | (Egypt) |
|---|---|---|---|---|---|---|---|---|---|---|---|---|
| 1 | Anzhelika Terliuga (UKR) | 4 | 2 | 2 | 0 | 6 | 9–4 | — | 0–0 | 4–0 | 4–4 | 1–0 |
| 2 | Bettina Plank (AUT) | 4 | 2 | 1 | 1 | 5 | 9–10 | 0–0 | — | 2–6 | 4–3 | 3–1 |
| 3 | Miho Miyahara (JPN) | 4 | 2 | 0 | 2 | 4 | 20–13 | 0–4 | 6–2 | — | 11–2 | 3–5 |
| 4 | Moldir Zhangbyrbay (KAZ) | 4 | 1 | 1 | 2 | 3 | 16–21 | 4–4 | 3–4 | 2–11 | — | 7–2 |
| 5 | Radwa Sayed (EGY) | 4 | 1 | 0 | 3 | 2 | 8–14 | 0–1 | 1–3 | 5–3 | 2–7 | — |

Source: Tokyo 2020

=== Finals ===
Semifinals
A1 Ivet Goranova (BUL) | 4
B2 Bettina Plank (AUT) (bronze) | 3
B1 Anzhelika Terliuga (UKR) | 4
A2 Wen Tzu-yun (TPE) (bronze) | 4

Gold medal
A1 Ivet Goranova (BUL) (gold) | 5
B1 Anzhelika Terliuga (UKR) (silver) | 1
