= Madina Sadigova =

Azerbaijani karateka (born 2001)

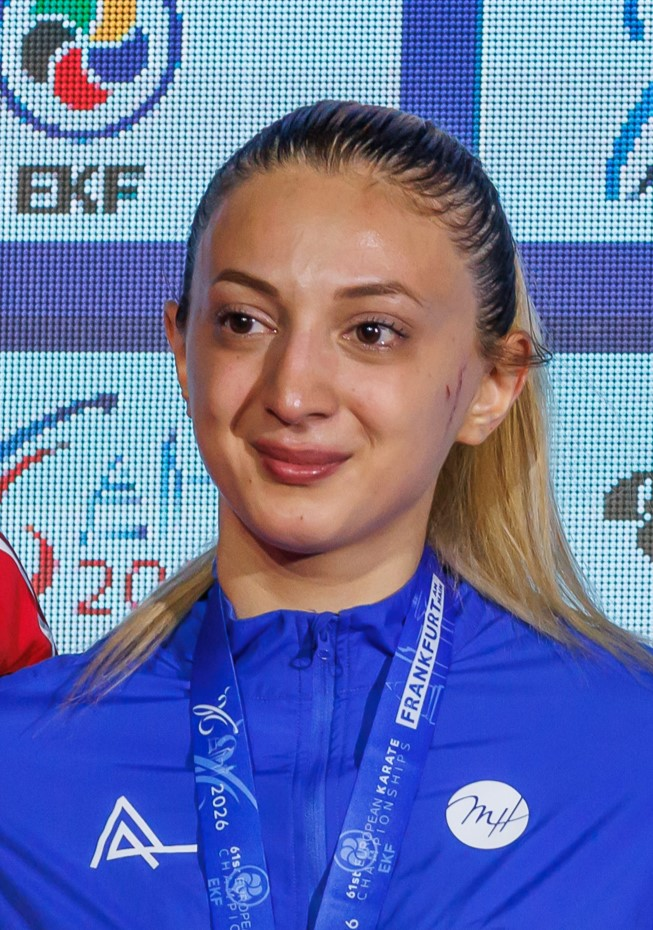

Personal information
- Born: 1 June 2001 (age 25) Ganja, Azerbaijan

Sport
- Country: Azerbaijan
- Sport: Karate
- Weight class: 55 kg
- Event: Kumite
Medal record
Women's karate
Representing Azerbaijan
European Championships
Gold medal – first place	2026 Frankfurt	Kumite 55 kg
Bronze medal – third place	2022 Gaziantep	Kumite 55 kg
Bronze medal – third place	2026 Frankfurt	Team kumite
Islamic Solidarity Games
Bronze medal – third place	2021 Konya	Kumite 55 kg
Bronze medal – third place	2025 Riyadh	Kumite 55 kg

Madina Vasif gizi Sadigova (Azerbaijani: Mədinə Vasif qızı Sadıqova; born 1 June 2001) is an Azerbaijani karateka. She won one of the bronze medals in the women's 55 kg event at the 2022 European Karate Championships held in Gaziantep, Turkey. She won one of the bronze medals in the women's 55 kg event at the 2021 Islamic Solidarity Games held in Konya, Turkey.

Sadigova competed in the women's 55 kg event at the 2023 European Games held in Poland. She finished in third place in her pool and she did not advance to compete in the semifinals. She competed in the women's 55 kg event at the 2023 World Karate Championships held in Budapest, Hungary.

== Achievements ==
Year	Competition	Venue	Rank	Event
2022	European Championships	Gaziantep, Turkey	3rd	Kumite 55 kg
2022	Islamic Solidarity Games	Konya, Turkey	3rd	Kumite 55 kg
2026	European Championships	Frankfurt, Germany	1st	Kumite 55 kg
2026	European Championships	Frankfurt, Germany	3rd	Team kumite
