= Anna Chernysheva =

Russian karateka (born 2001)

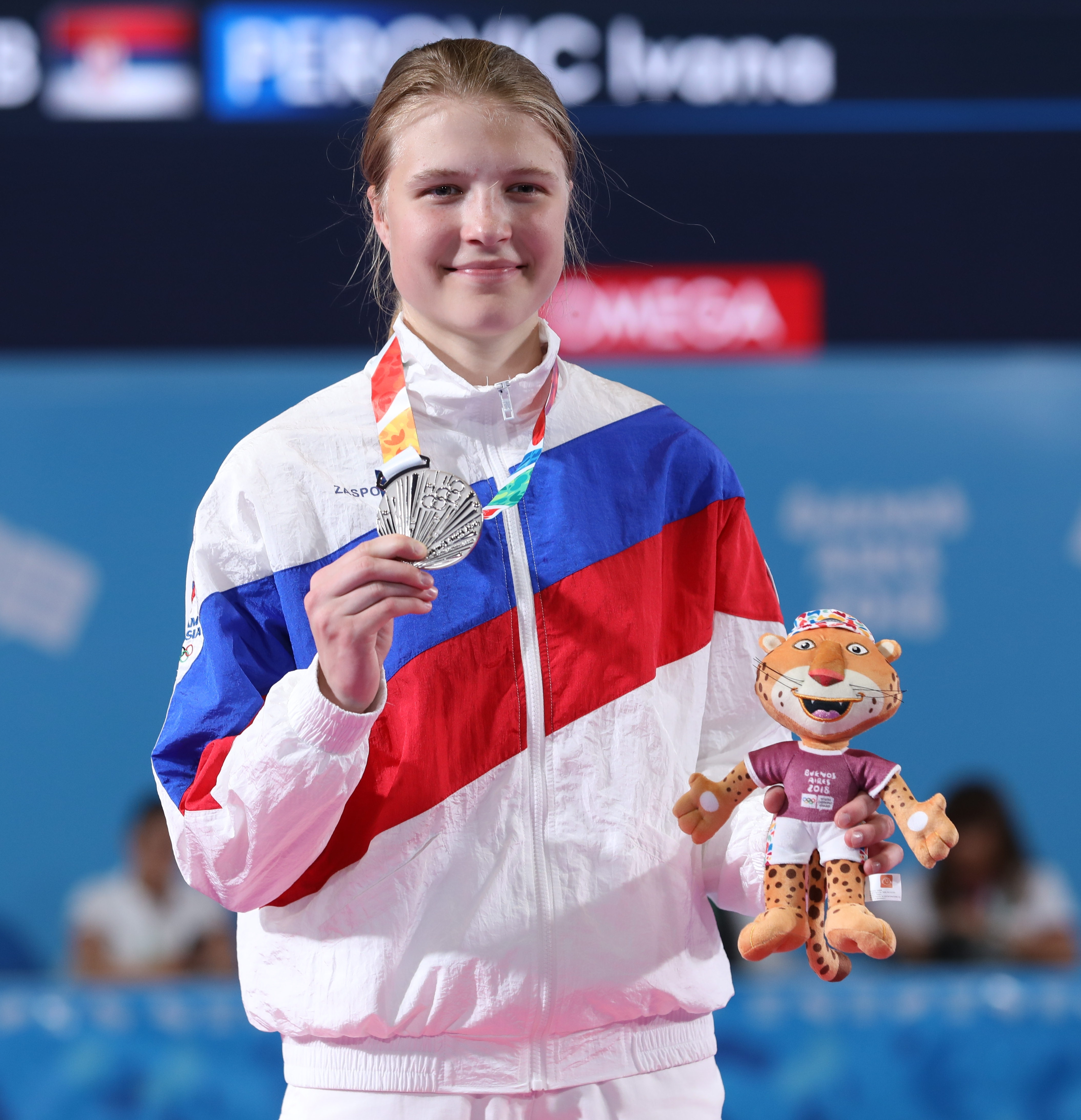
- Anna Chernysheva in Buenos Aires in 2018

Personal information
- Native name: Анна Сергеевна Чернышева
- Full name: Anna Sergeyevna Chernysheva
- Born: 29 September 2001 (age 24) Tolyatti, Samara Oblast, Russia
- Education: Volga Region State Academy of Physical Education, Sport and Tourism

Sport
- Country: Russia
- Sport: Karate
- Weight class: 55 kg
- Event: Kumite
- Club: Record Karate School, Tolyatti
- Coached by: Alexander Yudin; Evgeny Kokin
Medal record
Women's karate
Representing European Karate Federation
European Championships
Bronze medal – third place	2025 Yerevan	Kumite 55 kg
Representing Russian Karate Federation
World Championships
Bronze medal – third place	2021 Dubai	Kumite 55 kg
Representing Russia
European Championships
Gold medal – first place	2021 Poreč	Kumite 55 kg
Summer Youth Olympics
Silver medal – second place	2018 Buenos Aires	Kumite 59 kg

Anna Sergeyevna Chernysheva (Russian: Анна Сергеевна Чернышева; born 29 September 2001) is a Russian karateka. She won the gold medal in the women's 55 kg event at the 2021 European Karate Championships held in Poreč, Croatia. She also won one of the bronze medals in the women's 55 kg event at the 2021 World Karate Championships held in Dubai, United Arab Emirates.

== Career ==
Chernysheva took up karate in 2010. In 2018 she won the silver medal in the girls' 59 kg event at the Summer Youth Olympics held in Buenos Aires, Argentina.

She qualified at the World Olympic Qualification Tournament in Paris to compete at the 2020 Summer Olympics in Tokyo. At the Olympics, she tested positive for COVID-19 and withdrew from the competition.

== Achievements ==
Year	Competition	Venue	Rank	Event
2021	European Championships	Poreč, Croatia	1st	Kumite 55 kg
2021	World Championships	Dubai, United Arab Emirates	3rd	Kumite 55 kg
2025	European Championships	Yerevan, Armenia	3rd	Kumite 55 kg
