= Veronica Brunori =

Italian karateka (born 2000)

Personal information
- Born: 14 September 2000 (age 25)

Sport
- Country: Italy
- Sport: Karate
- Weight class: 55 kg
- Events: Kumite; Team kumite
Medal record
Women's karate
Representing Italy
European Championships
Silver medal – second place	2023 Guadalajara	Kumite 55 kg
Bronze medal – third place	2025 Yerevan	Team kumite
Mediterranean Games
Silver medal – second place	2026 Taranto	Kumite 55 kg
Bronze medal – third place	2022 Oran	Kumite 55 kg

Veronica Brunori (born 14 September 2000) is an Italian karateka. She won the silver medal in the women's 55 kg event at the 2023 European Karate Championships held in Guadalajara, Spain. She won one of the bronze medals in the women's 55 kg event at the 2022 Mediterranean Games held in Oran, Algeria.

Brunori lost her bronze medal match in the women's 55 kg event at the 2022 European Karate Championships held in Gaziantep, Turkey. She competed in the women's 55 kg event at the 2023 European Games held in Poland. She was eliminated in the elimination round and she did not advance to compete in the semifinals.

== Achievements ==
Year	Competition	Venue	Rank	Event
2022	Mediterranean Games	Oran, Algeria	3rd	Kumite 55 kg
2023	European Championships	Guadalajara, Spain	2nd	Kumite 55 kg
2025	European Championships	Yerevan, Armenia	3rd	Team kumite
2026	Mediterranean Games	Taranto, Italy	2nd	Kumite 55 kg
