= Amy Connell =

Scottish karateka

Sport
- Country: Scotland
- Sport: Karate
- Weight class: 55 kg
- Event: Kumite
Medal record
Women's karate
Representing Scotland
European Championships
Bronze medal – third place	2019 Guadalajara	Kumite 55 kg
Bronze medal – third place	2022 Gaziantep	Kumite 55 kg

Amy Connell is a Scottish karateka. She is a two-time bronze medalist at the European Karate Championships.

Connell competed in the women's 55 kg event at the 2019 European Games held in Minsk, Belarus. In 2021, she competed in the women's 55 kg event at the World Karate Championships held in Dubai, United Arab Emirates where she was eliminated in her first match.

Connell won one of the bronze medals in the women's 55 kg event at the 2022 European Karate Championships held in Gaziantep, Turkey. In 2023, she competed in the women's 55 kg event at the European Karate Championships held in Guadalajara, Spain and in the women's 55 kg event at the World Karate Championships held in Budapest, Hungary.

== Achievements ==
Year	Competition	Venue	Rank	Event
2019	European Championships	Guadalajara, Spain	3rd	Kumite 55 kg
2022	European Championships	Gaziantep, Turkey	3rd	Kumite 55 kg
