= Tuba Yakan =

Turkish karateka (born 1991)

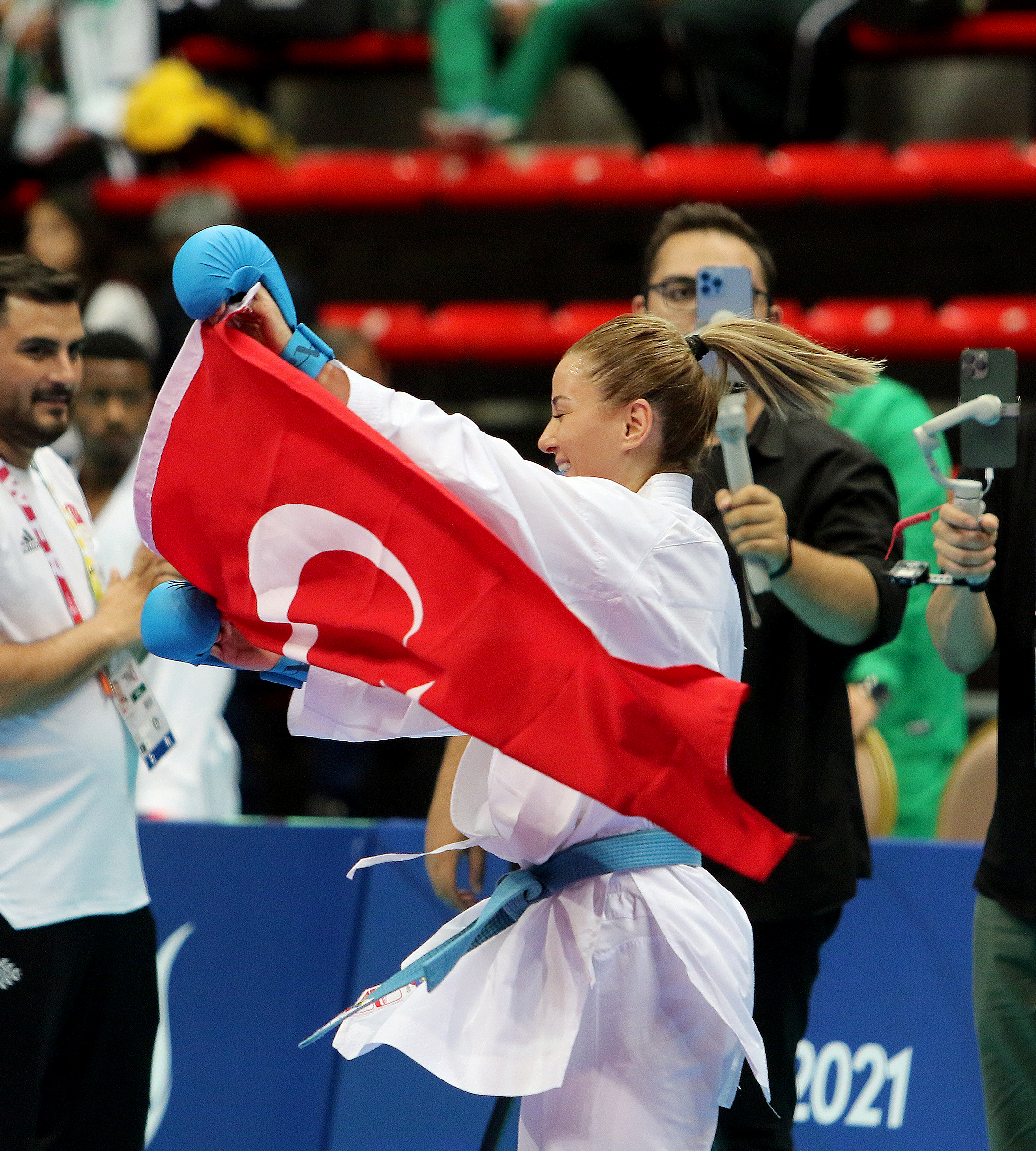

Personal information
- Nationality: Turkish
- Born: January 8, 1991 (age 35) İzmit, Turkey
- Education: Kocaeli University

Sport
- Sport: Karate – Kumite
- Weight class: −55 kg
- Team: Kocaeli BB Kağıt SK
Medal record
Women's karate
Representing Turkey
World Championships
| Gold medal – first place | 2023 Budapest | Kumite 55 kg |
| Bronze medal – third place | 2012 Paris | Team kumite |
European Karate Championships
| Gold medal – first place | 2012 Adeje | Team kumite |
| Gold medal – first place | 2013 Budapest | Kumite 55 kg |
| Gold medal – first place | 2014 Tampere | Team kumite |
| Gold medal – first place | 2017 İzmit | Kumite 55 kg |
| Silver medal – second place | 2015 Istanbul | Kumite 55 kg |
| Silver medal – second place | 2017 İzmit | Team kumite |
| Silver medal – second place | 2019 Guadalajara | Kumite 55 kg |
| Bronze medal – third place | 2015 Istanbul | Team kumite |
| Bronze medal – third place | 2018 Novi Sad | Kumite 55 kg |
| Bronze medal – third place | 2023 Guadalajara | Kumite 55 kg |
| Bronze medal – third place | 2024 Zadar | Kumite 55 kg |
| Bronze medal – third place | 2024 Zadar | Team kumite |
European Games
| Bronze medal – third place | 2023 Kraków | Kumite 55 kg |
Mediterranean Games
| Gold medal – first place | 2013 Mersin | Kumite 55 kg |
| Gold medal – first place | 2018 Tarragona | Kumite 55 kg |
| Bronze medal – third place | 2022 Oran | Kumite 55 kg |
Islamic Solidarity Games
| Gold medal – first place | 2021 Konya | Kumite 55 kg |

Tuba Yakan (born 8 January 1991) is a Turkish karateka competing in the 55 kg kumite division. She has won multiple titles at the European and Mediterranean Games. She is married to national karateka Mehmet Yakan.

== Career ==
Yakan won her first major international title at the 2013 Mediterranean Games in Mersin, Turkey, where she claimed gold in the −55 kg category. In March 2015, she took silver at the 2015 European Karate Championships in Istanbul, losing the final to Emilie Thouy.

She competed at the 2015 European Games in Baku but was eliminated in the group stage.

After a break of nearly two years due to pregnancy and childbirth, she returned to competition in May 2017 at the 2017 European Karate Championships in Kocaeli, where she defeated Sara Cardin in the final to win gold.

She took bronze at the 2018 European Karate Championships in Novi Sad and went on to claim her second Mediterranean Games title at the 2018 Mediterranean Games in Tarragona.

At the 2022 Mediterranean Games in Oran, Algeria, Yakan won bronze in the −55 kg category after defeating Arianne Miles Gonzales in the third-place match. Later that year, she won gold at the 2021 Islamic Solidarity Games in Konya, defeating Abouriche Louiza in the final.

In 2023, she captured the gold medal in the −55 kg category at the 2023 World Karate Championships in Budapest, Hungary.
