= Jennifer Warling =

Luxembourgish karateka (born 1994)

Personal information
- Born: 25 March 1994 (age 32)

Sport
- Country: Luxembourg
- Sport: Karate
- Weight class: 55 kg
- Event: Kumite
Medal record
Women's karate
Representing Luxembourg
European Games
Bronze medal – third place	2019 Minsk	Kumite 55 kg
Bronze medal – third place	2023 Kraków-Małopolska	Kumite 55 kg
European Championships
Gold medal – first place	2019 Guadalajara	Kumite 55 kg
Silver medal – second place	2014 Tampere	Kumite 55 kg
Silver medal – second place	2025 Yerevan	Kumite 55 kg
Bronze medal – third place	2015 Istanbul	Kumite 55 kg
Games of the Small States of Europe
Gold medal – first place	2025 Andorra la Vella	Kumite 55 kg

Jennifer Warling (born 25 March 1994) is a karateka from Luxembourg. She is a four-time medalist, including gold, in the women's kumite 55 kg event at the European Karate Championships. She is also a two-time bronze medalist in her event at the European Games (2019 and 2023).

== Career ==
Warling won the silver medal in the women's kumite 55 kg event at the 2014 European Karate Championships held in Tampere, Finland. In 2015, she competed in the women's kumite 55 kg event at the European Games held in Baku, Azerbaijan. She did not advance to compete in the semi-finals.

In 2019, Warling won the gold medal in the women's kumite 55 kg event at the European Karate Championships held in Guadalajara, Spain. In the same year, she also won one of the bronze medals in the women's kumite 55 kg event at the 2019 European Games held in Minsk, Belarus.

In June 2021, Warling competed at the World Olympic Qualification Tournament held in Paris, France hoping to qualify for the 2020 Summer Olympics in Tokyo, Japan. She reached the semi-finals where she lost against Moldir Zhangbyrbay of Kazakhstan. In November 2021, Warling lost her bronze medal match in the women's 55 kg event at the World Karate Championships held in Dubai, United Arab Emirates.

Warling lost her bronze medal match in the women's kumite 55 kg at the 2022 World Games held in Birmingham, United States. She won one of the bronze medals in the women's 55 kg event at the 2023 European Games held in Poland. A few months later, Warling competed in the women's 55 kg event at the 2023 World Karate Championships held in Budapest, Hungary.

Warling won the silver medal in the women's 55 kg event at the 2025 European Karate Championships held in Yerevan, Armenia.

== Achievements ==
Year	Competition	Venue	Rank	Event
2014	European Championships	Tampere, Finland	2nd	Kumite 55 kg
2015	European Championships	Istanbul, Turkey	3rd	Kumite 55 kg
2019	European Championships	Guadalajara, Spain	1st	Kumite 55 kg
2019	European Games	Minsk, Belarus	3rd	Kumite 55 kg
2023	European Games	Kraków and Małopolska, Poland	3rd	Kumite 55 kg
2025	European Championships	Yerevan, Armenia	2nd	Kumite 55 kg
