= Anzhelika Terliuga =

Ukrainian karateka (born 1992)

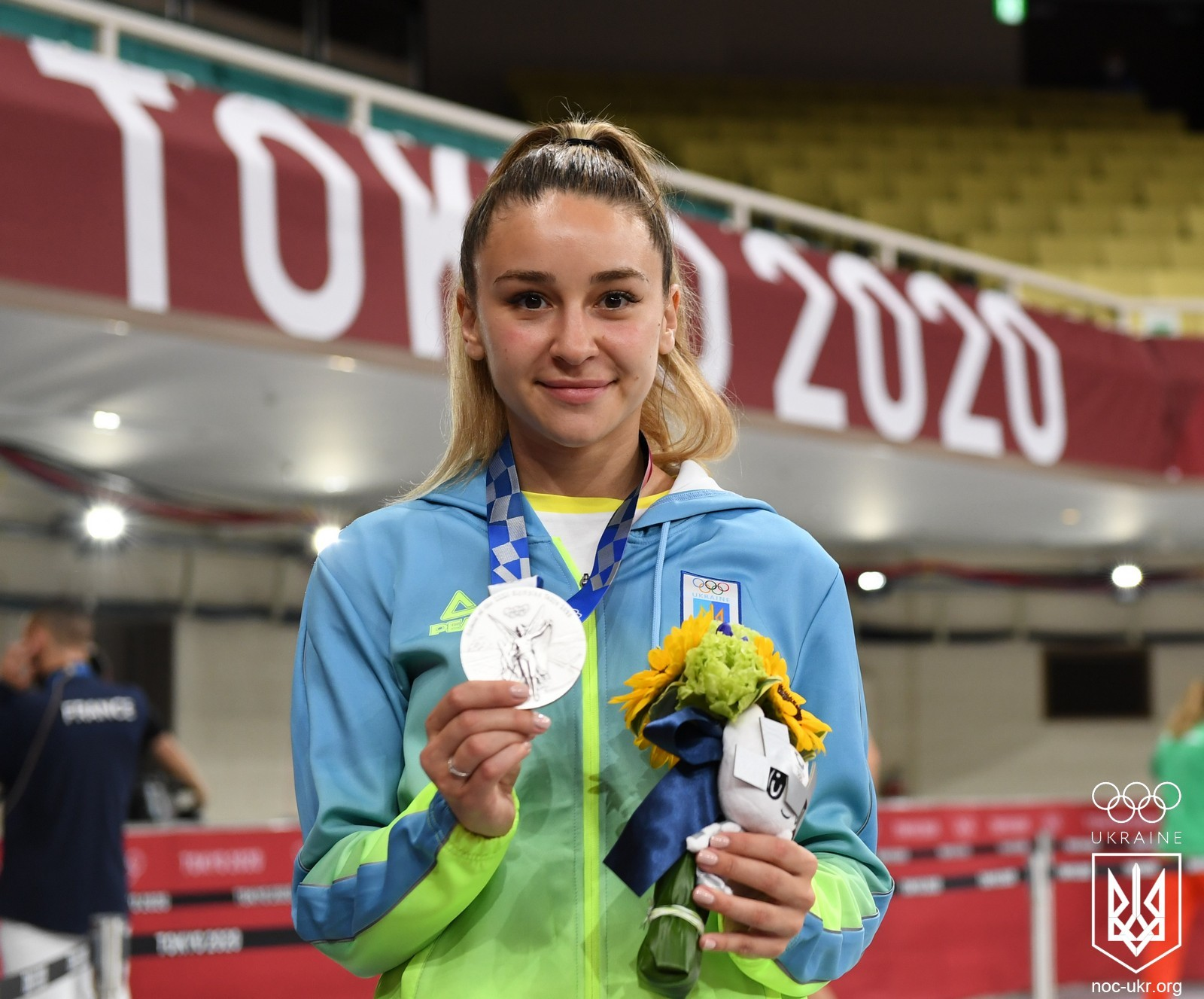
- Terliuga with her Olympic silver medal
- Born: Анжеліка Терлюга; March 27, 1992 (age 34); Odesa, Ukraine
- Nationality: Ukrainian
- Division: -55 kg
- Style: Karate Kumite
- Trainer: Denys Morozov

Anzhelika Terliuga (Ukrainian: Анжеліка Володимирівна Терлюга, born March 23, 1992) is a Ukrainian karateka competing in the kumite 55 kg division. She is an Olympic silver medallist, having placed second at the 2020 Summer Olympics.

== Career ==
Terliuga finished as a silver medallist in the 2016 European Karate Championships behind Italian Sara Cardin, who she lost to in the final.

Terliuga won the gold medal at the 2018 European Karate Championships, held in Novi Sad, defeating Alessandra Hasani of Croatia in the final.

Terliuga took part in the women's 55 kg event at the 2020 Summer Olympics in Tokyo, Japan. In the tournament she became the first Ukrainian woman to win a bout in karate. After a record of two wins and two draws in the pool stage, Terliuga beat Wen Tzu-yun in the semi finals to reach the final. In the final she lost 5–1 against Ivet Goranova of Bulgaria to win the silver medal.

She won the gold medal in the women's 55 kg event at the 2022 World Games held in Birmingham, United States.

Terliuga won the gold medal in the women's 55 kg event at the 2023 European Games held in Poland. Terliuga won one of the bronze medals in the women's 55 kg event at the 2023 World Karate Championships held in Budapest, Hungary. At the 2023 World Championships, she initially defeated Ivet Goranova 14-11 in the semifinal, however Bulgaria′s delegation appealed due to referee′s mistake (turning off the clock for 20 seconds), so both karatekas had to come back and restart the bout from the 5–4 lead of Goranova, who won the bout 6–4.

== Personal life ==
Terliuga became a mother in December 2024, giving birth to a daughter.
