= Morocco at the 2023 African Games =

- Flag of Morocco
- IOC code: MAR
- NOC: Moroccan National Olympic Committee

in Accra, Ghana 8 March 2024 – 23 March 2024
- Medals Ranked 7th: Gold 9 Silver 12 Bronze 14 Total 35

African Games appearances
- 1973; 1978; 1987–2015; 2019; 2023

Morocco competed at the 2023 African Games held from 8 to 23 March 2024 in Accra, Ghana.

== Medal table ==
Medal	Name	Sport	Event	Date
Gold	Aya En-Nesyry	Karate	Women's kata individual	7 March
Gold	Fatima-Zahra Chajai	Karate	Women's kumite −68 kg	7 March
Gold	Mohamed Abicha; Soufiane El Gharouti	Beach volleyball	Men's tournament	14 March
Gold	Fatima-Ezzahra Aboufaras	Taekwondo	Women's +73 kg	17 March
Gold	Boumh Omayma	Taekwondo	Women's −73 kg	18 March
Gold	Saad Hinti	Athletics	Men's 400 metres hurdles	21 March
Gold	Ayoub Bassel; Omayma Boumh; Oumaima El-Bouchti; Soufiane Elasbi; Merieme Khoulal; Haitam Zarhouti	Taekwondo	Mixed team kyorugi	21 March
Gold	Widad Bertal	Boxing	Women's −54 kg	22 March
Gold	Khadija Mardi	Boxing	Women's +81 kg	22 March
Silver	Maroua Eddarhr	Karate	Women's kumite +68 kg	7 March
Silver	Adam Rchouq	Karate	Men's kata individual	8 March
Silver	Said Oubaya	Karate	Men's kumite −67 kg	8 March
Silver	Aya En-Nesyry; Sanae Agalmam; Marwa Salmi	Karate	Women's kata team	8 March
Silver	Ismail Ettalibi	Wrestling	Men's Greco-Roman 60 kg	9 March
Silver	Zineb Hassoune	Wrestling	Women's freestyle 57 kg	10 March
Silver	Badr Siwane	Triathlon	Men	15 March
Silver	Soukaina Sahib	Taekwondo	Women's −46 kg	20 March
Silver	Noura Ennadi	Athletics	Women's 400 mwtres hurdles	22 March
Silver	Saad Hammouda	Athletics	Men's high jump	22 March
Silver	Yassine Elouarz	Boxing	Men's −75 kg	22 March
Silver	Rabab Cheddal	Boxing	Women's −52 kg	22 March
Bronze	Mehdi Sriti	Karate	Men's kumite −84 kg	7 March
Bronze	Abdel Ali Jina	Karate	Men's kumite −60 kg	8 March
Bronze	Chaimae El Hayti	Karate	Women's kumite −55 kg	8 March
Bronze	Fatima-Zahra Chajai; Maroua Eddarhri; Chaimae El Hayti	Karate	Women's kumite team	9 March
Bronze	Souhaib Khdar	Wrestling	Men's Greco-Roman 67 kg	9 March
Bronze	Oumaima El-Bouchti	Taekwondo	Women's −53 kg	17 March
Bronze	Ayoub Bassel	Taekwondo	Men's +87 kg	18 March
Bronze	Soufiane Elasbi	Taekwondo	Men's −87 kg	19 March
Bronze	Safia Salih	Taekwondo	Women's −67 kg	19 March
Bronze	Merieme Khoulal	Taekwondo	Women's −62 kg	20 March
Bronze	Hamza Essaadi	Boxing	Men's −48 kg	22 March
Bronze	Imad Azoui	Boxing	Men's −54 kg	22 March
Bronze	Yasmine Moutaqui	Boxing	Women's −50 kg	22 March
Bronze	Aya El Aouni Yasmine Kabbaj	Tennis	Women's team	23 March
