= Karate at the 2023 Arab Games =

- Venue: La Coupole Arena
- Location: Algiers, Algeria
- Dates: 13-14 July

At the 2023 Arab Games, the karate events were held at La Coupole Arena in Algiers, Algeria from 13 to 14 July. A total of 14 events were contested.

== Medal table ==
* Host nation (Algeria)

2023 Karate Arab Games medal table
| Rank | NOC | Gold | Silver | Bronze | Total |
|---|---|---|---|---|---|
| 1 | Algeria (ALG)* | 5 | 3 | 4 | 12 |
| 2 | Jordan (JOR) | 3 | 2 | 2 | 7 |
| 3 | Morocco (MAR) | 2 | 6 | 2 | 10 |
| 4 | Saudi Arabia (KSA) | 2 | 1 | 8 | 11 |
| 5 | Tunisia (TUN) | 2 | 1 | 5 | 8 |
| 6 | Palestine (PLE) | 0 | 1 | 0 | 1 |
| 7 | Libya (LBA) | 0 | 0 | 4 | 4 |
| 8 | United Arab Emirates (UAE) | 0 | 0 | 2 | 2 |
| 9 | Iraq (IRQ) | 0 | 0 | 1 | 1 |
| 10 | Mauritania (MTN) | 0 | 0 | 0 | 0 |
| 10 | Qatar (QAT) | 0 | 0 | 0 | 0 |
| 10 | Syria (SYR) | 0 | 0 | 0 | 0 |
| Totals (12 entries) | | 14 | 14 | 28 | 56 |

== Medal summary ==
=== Men ===
| Event | Gold | Silver | Bronze |
|---|---|---|---|
| -60 kg | Omar Issa Omar Shaqrah (JOR) | Abdel Ali Jina (MAR) | Rouichi Naim Abdesselam (ALG) |
| -60 kg | Omar Issa Omar Shaqrah (JOR) | Abdel Ali Jina (MAR) | Albasher Saud Abdulaziz B (KSA) |
| -67 kg | Abdel Rahman Tayel Hayel Almasatfa (JOR) | Fanas Atiah S Alkhatami (KSA) | Fouad Benbara (ALG) |
| -67 kg | Abdel Rahman Tayel Hayel Almasatfa (JOR) | Fanas Atiah S Alkhatami (KSA) | Ibrahim Alshati (LBA) |
| -75 kg | Sultan Jaman M Alzahrani (KSA) | Anass Alami (MAR) | Mohamed Abudabous (LBA) |
| -75 kg | Sultan Jaman M Alzahrani (KSA) | Anass Alami (MAR) | Hasan Sami Hasan Masarweh (JOR) |
| -84 kg | Mohammad Faiq Mohammad Aljafari (JOR) | Mehdi Sriti (MAR) | Mohamed Alsuwee (LBA) |
| -84 kg | Mohammad Faiq Mohammad Aljafari (JOR) | Mehdi Sriti (MAR) | Faraj Rajeh B Alnashri (KSA) |
| +84 kg | Sanad Hassan Y Sufyani (KSA) | Mahmoud Khaled Mahmoud Sajan (JOR) | Houssem Edine Choiya (TUN) |
| +84 kg | Sanad Hassan Y Sufyani (KSA) | Mahmoud Khaled Mahmoud Sajan (JOR) | Hocine Daikhi (ALG) |
| Kata Individual | Saber Benmakhlouf (ALG) | Salah Eddine El Mansoury (MAR) | Binar Mustafa Hama Salih (IRQ) |
| Kata Individual | Saber Benmakhlouf (ALG) | Salah Eddine El Mansoury (MAR) | Masfer Dafer M Alasmari (KSA) |
| Kata Team | Algeria (ALG); Saber Ben Makhlouf; Abdelali Tahoulit; Badis Abderrahmane Belaabed | Tunisia (TUN); Mohamed Wider; Bilel Abdellaoui; Mohamed Rayen Ghanjati | Morocco (MAR); Salah Eddine EL Mansoury; Adnan Chakir; Ayoub Qissi |
| Kata Team | Algeria (ALG); Saber Ben Makhlouf; Abdelali Tahoulit; Badis Abderrahmane Belaabed | Tunisia (TUN); Mohamed Wider; Bilel Abdellaoui; Mohamed Rayen Ghanjati | Saudi Arabia (KSA); Mesfer Dafer M Alasmari; Abdullah Mutlaq A Almalki; Mohammed Ibrahim M Alrajeh; Fadil Fathi S Alghumgham |

=== Women ===
| Event | Gold | Silver | Bronze |
|---|---|---|---|
| -50 kg | Cylia Ouikene (ALG) | Chaimae El Hayti (MAR) | Islem Ben Hassen (TUN) |
| -50 kg | Cylia Ouikene (ALG) | Chaimae El Hayti (MAR) | Hawraa Alajmi (UAE) |
| -55 kg | Louiza Abouriche (ALG) | Leen Ameen Mohamad Mansour (JOR) | Chirine Zarati (TUN) |
| -55 kg | Louiza Abouriche (ALG) | Leen Ameen Mohamad Mansour (JOR) | Malak Saeed S Alkhulaidi (KSA) |
| -61 kg | Wafa Mahjoub (TUN) | Chaima Midi (ALG) | Sara Alameri (UAE) |
| -61 kg | Wafa Mahjoub (TUN) | Chaima Midi (ALG) | Fatima-Zahra Chajai (MAR) |
| -68 kg | Nissrine Brouk (MAR) | Hala Alqadi (PLE) | Karima Mekkaoui (ALG) |
| -68 kg | Nissrine Brouk (MAR) | Hala Alqadi (PLE) | Joud Raed Mohammad Aldrous (JOR) |
| +68 kg | Isra Ben Taieb (TUN) | Chaima Oudira (ALG) | Hafed Salma Mohamed Mostafa (LBA) |
| +68 kg | Isra Ben Taieb (TUN) | Chaima Oudira (ALG) | Almosallam Shamsa Ayman A (KSA) |
| Kata Individual | Aicha Narimane Dahlab (ALG) | Aya Ennesyry (MAR) | Meriem Tlili (TUN) |
| Kata Individual | Aicha Narimane Dahlab (ALG) | Aya Ennesyry (MAR) | Manal Abdullah Z Alzaid (KSA) |
| Kata Team | Morocco (MAR); Aya Ennesyry; Sanae Agalmam; Wissal Khalfi | Algeria (ALG); Aicha Narimane Dahlab; Sara Hanouti; Rayane Salakedji | Tunisia (TUN); Meriem Tlili; Nour Tlili; Zeineb Tlili |
| Kata Team | Morocco (MAR); Aya Ennesyry; Sanae Agalmam; Wissal Khalfi | Algeria (ALG); Aicha Narimane Dahlab; Sara Hanouti; Rayane Salakedji | Saudi Arabia (KSA); Malak Saeed S Alkhulaidi; Monarah Ayed M Alotaibi; Manal Abdullah Z Alzaid |

== Participating nations ==
- Iraq (6)
- Palestine (5)
- Jordan (8)
- Saudi Arabia (15)
- Algeria (16)
- Morocco (14)
- Tunisia (14)
- Qatar (2)
- Mauritania (2)
- Libya (5)
- Syria (1)
- United Arab Emirates (4)
