= 2025 World Karate Championships – Women's 55 kg =

Women's kumite 55 kg at the 2025 World Karate Championships
- Venue: Cairo Stadium Indoor Halls Complex
- Location: Cairo, Egypt
- Dates: 27–30 November
- Competitors: 31

Medalists
gold medal	Ahlam Youssef	Egypt
silver medal	Nina Kvasnicová	Slovakia
bronze medal	Anzhelika Terliuga	Ukraine
bronze medal	Louiza Abouriche	Algeria

The women's kumite 55 kg competition at the 2025 World Karate Championships was held from 27 to 30 November 2025.

== Results ==
=== Group phase ===
==== Group A ====
Pos	Athlete	B	W	D	D^{0}	L	Pts	Score	(Italy)	(Slovakia)	(Dominican Republic)	(Morocco)
1	Viola Lallo (ITA)	3	3	0	0	0	9	10–3	—	4–2	4–1	2–0
2	Nina Kvasnicová (SVK)	3	2	0	0	1	6	12–5	2–4	—	5–0	5–1
3	Thalía Terrero (DOM)	3	1	0	0	2	3	6–11	1–4	0–5	—	5–2
4	Chaimae El Hayti (MAR)	3	0	0	0	3	0	3–12	0–2	1–5	2–5	—

==== Group B ====
Pos	Athlete	B	W	D	D^{0}	L	Pts	Score	(Egypt)	(Canada)	(Kazakhstan)	(Georgia (country))
1	Ahlam Youssef (EGY) [3]	3	3	0	0	0	9	17–4	—	3–1	4–2	11–1
2	Hana Furumoto-Deshaies (CAN)	3	2	0	0	1	6	7–3	1–3	—	2–0	4–0
3	Gulmira Ussenova (KAZ)	3	1	0	0	2	3	11–7	2–4	0–2	—	9–1
4	Lizi Zviadauri (GEO)	3	0	0	0	3	0	2–24	1–11	0–4	1–9	—

==== Group C ====
Pos	Athlete	B	W	D	D^{0}	L	Pts	Score	(Iran)	(Azerbaijan)	(Australia)	(Nigeria)
1	Fatemeh Saadati (IRI)	3	2	0	1	0	6 (Note: Saadati (IRI) 0–0 Sadigova (AZE). Scores obtained: Saadati 13, Sadigova 10.)	13–0	—	0–0	8–0	5–0
2	Madina Sadigova (AZE)	3	2	0	1	0	6	10–0	0–0	—	9–0	1–0
3	Georgie Lawrence (AUS)	3	1	0	0	2	3	1–17	0–8	0–9	—	1–0
4	Godfirst Ukoha-Sampson (NGR)	3	0	0	0	3	0	0–7	0–5	0–1	0–1	—

==== Group D ====
Pos	Athlete	B	W	D	D^{0}	L	Pts	Score	(Chile)	(Japan)		(Sweden)
1	Valentina Toro (CHI) [2]	3	3	0	0	0	9	7–2	—	1–1	3–0	3–1
2	Rina Kodo (JPN)	3	2	0	0	1	6	10–3	1–1	—	3–1	6–1
3	Anna Chernysheva (WKF-1)	3	1	0	0	2	3	2–7	0–3	1–3	—	1–1
4	Matilda Rosenlind (SWE)	3	0	0	0	3	0	3–10	1–3	1–6	1–1	—

==== Group E ====
Pos	Athlete	B	W	D	D^{0}	L	Pts	Score	(Algeria)	(El Salvador)	(China)	(Belgium)
1	Louiza Abouriche (ALG)	3	3	0	0	0	9	16–6	—	9–3	3–1	4–2
2	Estefany Izaguirre (ESA)	3	2	0	0	1	6	12–10	3–9	—	2–0	7–1
3	Wei Yuchun (CHN)	3	1	0	0	2	3	10–5	1–3	0–2	—	9–0
4	Ayah El Aidi (BEL)	3	0	0	0	3	0	3–20	2–4	1–7	0–9	—

==== Group F ====
Pos	Athlete	B	W	D	D^{0}	L	Pts	Score	(Uzbekistan)	(Greece)	(Germany)	(Burundi)
1	Sevinch Rakhimova (UZB)	3	3	0	0	0	9	15–4	—	6–2	4–1	5–1
2	Maria Stoli (GRE)	3	2	0	0	3	6	16–9	2–6	—	3–1	11–2
3	Mia Bitsch (GER) [4]	3	1	0	0	2	3	12–7	1–4	1–3	—	10–0
4	Alice Sifa Ishimwe (BDI)	3	0	0	0	3	0	3–16	1–5	2–11	0–10	—

==== Group G ====
Pos	Athlete	B	W	D	D^{0}	L	Pts	Score	(Bulgaria)	(India)	(Guatemala)	(New Zealand)
1	Ivet Goranova (BUL)	3	2	0	1	0	6 (Note: Goranova (BUL) 0–0 Choudhary (IND). Scores obtained: Goranova 17, Choudhary 14.)	17–0	—	0–0	10–0	7–0
2	Alisha Choudhary (IND)	3	2	0	1	0	6	14–1	0–0	—	4–0	10–1
3	Fabiana Cevasco (GUA)	3	1	0	0	2	3	6–16	0–10	0–4	—	6–2
4	Britne Aldridge (NZL)	3	0	0	0	3	0	3–23	0–7	1–10	2–6	—

==== Group H ====
Pos	Athlete	B	W	D	D^{0}	L	Pts	Score	(Chinese Taipei)	(Ukraine)	(Luxembourg)
1	Ku Tsui-ping (TPE)	2	2	0	0	0	6	11–0	—	1–0	10–0
2	Anzhelika Terliuga (UKR) [1]	2	1	0	0	1	3	7–1	0–1	—	7–0
3	Jennifer Warling (LUX)	2	0	0	0	2	0	0–17	0–10	0–7	—

=== Elimination phase ===
Round of 16; 27 November
Anzhelika Terliuga (UKR)	6
Viola Lallo (ITA)	0
Alisha Choudhary (IND)	1
Ahlam Youssef (EGY)	9
Maria Stoli (GRE)	1
Fatemeh Saadati (IRI)	2
Estefany Izaguirre (ESA)	0
Valentina Toro (CHI)	9
Rina Kodo (JPN)	4
Louiza Abouriche (ALG)	5
Madina Sadigova (AZE)	3
Sevinch Rakhimova (UZB)	1
Hana Furumoto-Deshaies (CAN)	7
Ivet Goranova (BUL)	5
Nina Kvasnicová (SVK)	0
Ku Tsui-ping (TPE)	0

Quarterfinals; 29 November
Anzhelika Terliuga (UKR)	4
Ahlam Youssef (EGY)	8
Fatemeh Saadati (IRI)	0
Valentina Toro (CHI)	1
Louiza Abouriche (ALG)	8
Madina Sadigova (AZE)	3
Hana Furumoto-Deshaies (CAN)	1
Nina Kvasnicová (SVK)	4

Semifinals; 29 November
Ahlam Youssef (EGY)	8
Valentina Toro (CHI)	4
Louiza Abouriche (ALG)	0
Nina Kvasnicová (SVK)	5

Final; 30 November
Ahlam Youssef (EGY)	9
Nina Kvasnicová (SVK)	3

Bronze medals 30 November
Anzhelika Terliuga (UKR)	6
Valentina Toro (CHI)	4
Hana Furumoto-Deshaies (CAN)	1
Louiza Abouriche (ALG)	4
