= Karate at the 2022 Mediterranean Games =

Karate competition

- Venue: Mohammed ben Ahmed CCO Hall 03 and 06
- Dates: 26–27 June
- Competitors: 133 from 20 nations

The Karate event at the 2022 Mediterranean Games was held in Oran, Algeria, from 26 to 27 June 2022.

== Medal table ==
* Host nation (Algeria)

Rank	Nation	Gold	Silver	Bronze	Total
1	Algeria*	4	2	0	6
2	Egypt	2	3	2	7
3	Greece	2	0	0	2
4	Turkey	1	0	4	5
5	Croatia	1	0	1	2
6	Italy	0	2	3	5
7	Tunisia	0	1	1	2
8	Montenegro	0	1	0	1
8	Serbia	0	1	0	1
10	Bosnia and Herzegovina	0	0	3	3
10	Morocco	0	0	3	3
12	Cyprus	0	0	1	1
12	France	0	0	1	1
12	Spain	0	0	1	1
Totals (14 entries)		10	10	20	40

== Medalists ==
=== Men ===
Event	Gold	Silver	Bronze
Kumite –60 kg	Eray Şamdan; Turkey	Ala Salmi; Algeria	Amr Aboukora; Egypt Rayyan Meziane; France
Kumite –67 kg	Dionysios Xenos; Greece	Luca Maresca; Italy	Ahmed Lotfy; Egypt Marcos Tsangaras; Cyprus
Kumite –75 kg	Oussama Zaid; Algeria	Abdalla Abdelaziz; Egypt	Luigi Busà; Italy Hamza Turulja; Bosnia and Herzegovina
Kumite –84 kg	Youssef Badawy; Egypt	Vladimir Brežančić; Serbia	Ivan Kvesić; Croatia Uğur Aktaş; Turkey
Kumite +84 kg	Anđelo Kvesić; Croatia	Hocine Daikhi; Algeria	Rijad Džuho; Bosnia and Herzegovina Mehdi Sriti; Morocco

=== Women ===
Event	Gold	Silver	Bronze
Kumite –50 kg	Cylia Ouikene; Algeria	Reem Salama; Egypt	Chaimae El Hayti; Morocco Alba Pinilla; Spain
Kumite –55 kg	Louiza Abouriche; Algeria	Ahlam Youssef; Egypt	Veronica Brunori; Italy Tuba Yakan; Turkey
Kumite –61 kg	Chaima Midi; Algeria	Wafa Mahjoub; Tunisia	Nejra Sipović; Bosnia and Herzegovina Alessandra Mangiacapra; Italy
Kumite –68 kg	Feryal Abdelaziz; Egypt	Silvia Semeraro; Italy	Nissrine Brouk; Morocco Eda Eltemur; Turkey
Kumite +68 kg	Kyriaki Kydonaki; Greece	Milena Jovanović; Montenegro	Meltem Hocaoğlu; Turkey Chehinez Jemi; Tunisia
