= Karate at the 2022 Mediterranean Games – Women's 50 kg =

Women's kumite 50 kg at the 2022 Mediterranean Games
- Venue: Mohammed ben Ahmed CCO Hall 03 and 06
- Date: 26 June
- Competitors: 12 from 12 nations

Medalists
gold medal	Cylia Ouikene	Algeria
silver medal	Reem Salama	Egypt
bronze medal	Chaimae El Hayti	Morocco
bronze medal	Alba Pinilla	Spain

The women's 50 kg competition in karate at the 2022 Mediterranean Games was held on 26 June at the Mohammed ben Ahmed CCO Hall 03 and 06 in Oran.

== Results ==
=== Bracket ===
Round of 16
Chaimae El Hayti (MAR)	2
Iris Ćorić (BIH)	1
Islem Ben Hassen (TUN)	1
Erminia Perfetto (ITA)	0
Urša Haberl (SLO)	0
Tiphaine Bonnarde (FRA)	0
Alba Pinilla (ESP)	0
Cylia Ouikene (ALG)	0

Quarterfinals
Chaimae El Hayti (MAR)	1
Reem Salama (EGY)	5
Islem Ben Hassen (TUN)	0
Serap Özçelik (TUR)	0
Urša Haberl (SLO)	1
Irene Kontou (CYP)	0
Cylia Ouikene (ALG)	2
Sara Leal (POR)	0

Semifinals
Reem Salama (EGY)	1
Serap Özçelik (TUR)	1
Urša Haberl (SLO)	0
Cylia Ouikene (ALG)	1

Final
Reem Salama (EGY)	0
Cylia Ouikene (ALG)	5

=== Repechage ===
Bronze medal
Chaimae El Hayti (MAR)	2
Serap Özçelik (TUR)	0

Repechage
Alba Pinilla (ESP)	4
Sara Leal (POR)	1

Bronze medal
Alba Pinilla (ESP)	4
Urša Haberl (SLO)	4
