= Hocine Daikhi =

Algerian karateka

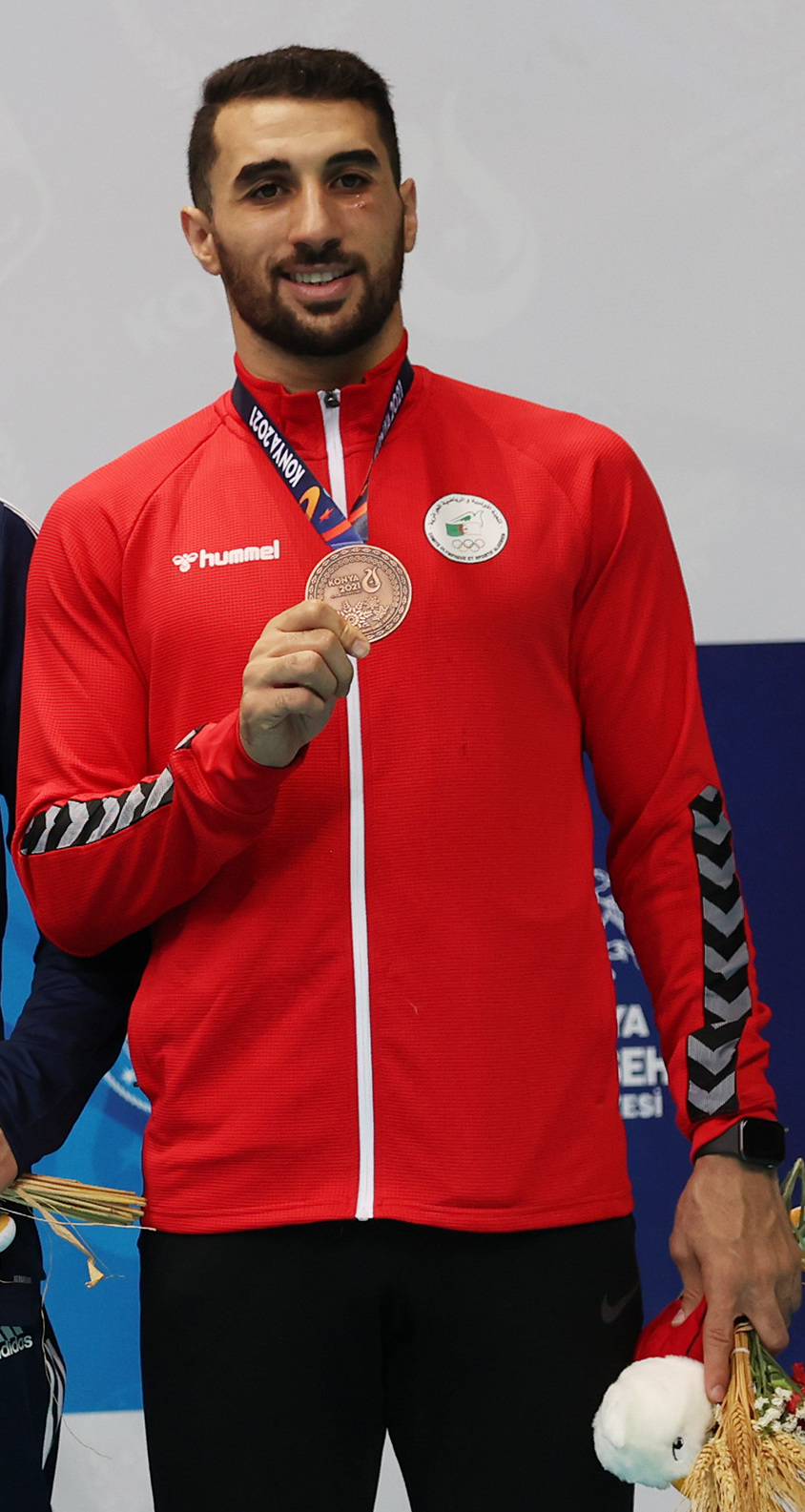

Sport
- Country: Algeria
- Sport: Karate
- Weight class: +84 kg
- Event: Kumite
Medal record
Men's karate
Representing Algeria
Event	1st	2nd	3rd
African Games	1	1	1
African Karate Championships	4	3	1
Islamic Solidarity Games	0	0	1
Mediterranean Games	1	1	1
Arab Games	0	0	1
Total	6	5	5
African Games
Gold medal – first place	2019 Rabat	Team kumite
Silver medal – second place	2019 Rabat	Kumite +84 kg
Silver medal – second place	2023 Accra	Team kumite
Bronze medal – third place	2023 Accra	Kumite +84 kg
African Karate Championships
Gold medal – first place	2018 Kigali	Kumite +84 kg
Gold medal – first place	2020 Tangier	Kumite +84 kg
Gold medal – first place	2020 Tangier	Team kumite
Gold medal – first place	2021 Cairo	Kumite +84 kg
Silver medal – second place	2019 Gaborone	Kumite +84 kg
Silver medal – second place	2019 Gaborone	Team kumite
Silver medal – second place	2021 Cairo	Team kumite
Bronze medal – third place	2018 Kigali	Team kumite
Islamic Solidarity Games
Bronze medal – third place	2021 Konya	Kumite +84 kg
Mediterranean Games
Gold medal – first place	2018 Tarragona	Kumite +84 kg
Silver medal – second place	2022 Oran	Kumite +84 kg
Bronze medal – third place	2026 Taranto	Kumite +84 kg
Arab Games
Bronze medal – third place	2023 Algiers	Kumite +84 kg

Hocine Daikhi is an Algerian karateka. He is a three-time medalist, including gold, at the Mediterranean Games, a silver medalist at the African Games and a bronze medalist at the Islamic Solidarity Games. He has also won medals in individual and team events at several editions of the African Karate Championships.

Daikhi won the gold medal in the men's +84 kg event at the 2018 Mediterranean Games held in Tarragona, Spain. He also won the silver medal in the men's +84 kg event at the 2022 Mediterranean Games held in Oran, Algeria.

== Career ==
Daikhi won one of the bronze medals in his event at the 2016 World University Karate Championships held in Braga, Portugal. He also won one of the bronze medals in the men's team kumite event.

At the 2018 Mediterranean Games held in Tarragona, Spain, Daikhi won the gold medal in the men's +84 kg event. In that same year, he won the gold medal in his event at the 2018 African Karate Championships held in Kigali, Rwanda. He won one of the bronze medals in the men's team kumite event.

Daikhi won the silver medal in his event at the 2019 African Karate Championships held in Gaborone, Botswana. He also won the silver medal in the men's team kumite event. Daikhi represented Algeria at the 2019 African Games and he won the silver medal in the men's kumite +84 kg event. He also won the gold medal in the men's team kumite event. In 2020, Daikhi won the gold medal in his event and the men's team kumite event at the 2020 African Karate Championships held in Tangier, Morocco.

In June 2021, Daikhi competed at the World Olympic Qualification Tournament held in Paris, France hoping to qualify for the 2020 Summer Olympics in Tokyo, Japan. He was eliminated in his second match by Daniyar Yuldashev of Kazakhstan. In November 2021, he competed in the men's +84 kg event at the World Karate Championships held in Dubai, United Arab Emirates. He was eliminated in his second match. In December 2021, Daikhi won the gold medal in his event at the African Karate Championships held in Cairo, Egypt. He also won the silver medal in the men's team kumite event.

Daikhi won the silver medal in the men's +84 kg event at the 2022 Mediterranean Games held in Oran, Algeria. In the final, he lost against Anđelo Kvesić of Croatia. Two months later, Daikhi won one of the bronze medals in the men's kumite +84 kg event at the 2021 Islamic Solidarity Games held in Konya, Turkey. He defeated Majid Nikohemmat of Iran in his bronze medal match.

In 2023, Daikhi won one of the bronze medals in the men's +84 kg event at the Arab Games held in Algiers, Algeria.

== Achievements ==
Year	Competition	Venue	Rank	Event
2018	Mediterranean Games	Tarragona, Spain	1st	Kumite +84 kg
2018	African Karate Championships	Kigali, Rwanda	1st	Kumite +84 kg
2018	African Karate Championships	Kigali, Rwanda	3rd	Team kumite
2019	African Karate Championships	Gaborone, Botswana	2nd	Kumite +84 kg
2019	African Karate Championships	Gaborone, Botswana	2nd	Team kumite
2019	African Games	Rabat, Morocco	2nd	Kumite +84 kg
2019	African Games	Rabat, Morocco	1st	Team kumite
2020	African Karate Championships	Tangier, Morocco	1st	Kumite +84 kg
2020	African Karate Championships	Tangier, Morocco	1st	Team kumite
2021	African Karate Championships	Cairo, Egypt	1st	Kumite +84 kg
2021	African Karate Championships	Cairo, Egypt	2nd	Team kumite
2022	Mediterranean Games	Oran, Algeria	2nd	Kumite +84 kg
2022	Islamic Solidarity Games	Konya, Turkey	3rd	Kumite +84 kg
2023	Arab Games	Algiers, Algeria	3rd	Kumite +84 kg
2024	African Games	Accra, Ghana	3rd	Kumite +84 kg
2024	African Games	Accra, Ghana	2nd	Team kumite
2026	Mediterranean Games	Taranto, Italy	3rd	Kumite +84 kg
