= Chirine Zarati =

Tunisian karateka

Personal information
- Born: December 16, 2002 (age 23)
- Home town: Gabès
- Education: Higher Institute of Sport and Physical Education of Ksar Said

Sport
- Country: Tunisia
- Sport: Karate
- Weight class: 55 kg
- Event: Kumite
Medal record
Women's karate
Representing Tunisia
African Championship
| Bronze medal – third place | 2021 Cairo | Kumite 55 kg |
| Bronze medal – third place | 2022 Durban | Kumite 55 kg |
| Bronze medal – third place | 2023 Casablanca | Kumite 55 kg |
Mediterranean Games
| Bronze medal – third place | 29th Mediterranean championships |
Arab Games
| Bronze medal – third place | 2023 Algiers | Kumite 55 kg |

Chirine Zarati is a Tunisian karateka born in Gabès. She won a silver medal at the 2021 African championships held in Cairo, Egypt and a bronze medal at the 2022 African championship held in Durban, South Africa.

== Career ==
Chirine Zarati achieved her first African championship medal at the African championship held in Cairo, Egypt. She competed at the Karate Premier League held in Rabaat, Morocco, in May 2022. In June, she contended at her first Mediterranean Games in Oran, Algeria, and in November she won a bronze medal at the African championship held in Durban, South Africa. In 2023, she competed at the Karate1 Series A championship held in Konya, Turkey, and placed 9th, and placed 3rd at the African championship held in Casablanca, Morocco. Zarati competed at the Arab Games in Algiers, Algeria and achieved a bronze medal. She also competed at the Mediterranean Games in 2023 held in her hometown, Tunisia, and won a bronze medal.

== Achievements ==
| Year | Competition | Venue | Rank | Event |
|---|---|---|---|---|
| 2021 | UFAK JUNIOR & SENIOR CHAMPIONSHIPS | Cairo, Egypt | 2nd | Kumite 55 kg |
| 2022 | UFAK JUNIOR & SENIOR CHAMPIONSHIPS | Durban, South Africa | 3rd | Kumite 55 kg |
| 2023 | UFAK JUNIOR & SENIOR CHAMPIONSHIPS | Casablanca, Morocco | 3rd | Kumite 55 kg |
| 2023 | Mediterranean championship | Rades, Tunisia | 3rd | Kumite 55 kg |
| 2023 | Arab Games | Algiers, Algeria | 3rd | Kumite 55 kg |
