= Karate at the 2023 African Games =

- Venue: Ga Mashie Hall
- Location: Accra, Ghana
- Dates: 7–9 March 2024

Karate events at the 2023 African Games took place from 7 to 9 March 2024 in Accra, Ghana.

== Medalists ==
=== Men ===
| Event | Gold | Silver | Bronze |
|---|---|---|---|
| Individual kata | Karim Waleed Ghaly; Egypt | Adam Rchouq; Morocco | Jesse Sim; South Africa |
| Individual kata | Karim Waleed Ghaly; Egypt | Adam Rchouq; Morocco | Saber Benmakhlouf; Algeria |
| Team kata | Egypt; Abdelrahman Abdelsalam; Mostafa El-Ghobashy; Zeyad Mohamed | Algeria; Youssef Zaid; Saber Ben Makhlouf; Abdelhadi Ouchaoua | Burkina Faso; Allan Sanou; Marc Sanou; Samuel Sanou |
| Team kata | Egypt; Abdelrahman Abdelsalam; Mostafa El-Ghobashy; Zeyad Mohamed | Algeria; Youssef Zaid; Saber Ben Makhlouf; Abdelhadi Ouchaoua | South Africa; Bradley Ho-Tong; Jesse Sim; Sibongiseni Ngwenya |
| Kumite −60 kg | Alaa Selmi; Algeria | Iheb Ferchichi; Tunisia | Abdelali Jina; Morocco |
| Kumite −60 kg | Alaa Selmi; Algeria | Iheb Ferchichi; Tunisia | Mohamed Salama; Egypt |
| Kumite −67 kg | Ayoub Anis Helassa; Algeria | Said Oubaya; Morocco | Moamen Sabry; Egypt |
| Kumite −67 kg | Ayoub Anis Helassa; Algeria | Said Oubaya; Morocco | Yoan Junior Dassi Tchouela; Cameroon |
| Kumite −75 kg | Abdalla Abdelaziz; Egypt | Mohamed Abudabous; Libya | Abraham Bikoka; Republic of the Congo |
| Kumite −75 kg | Abdalla Abdelaziz; Egypt | Mohamed Abudabous; Libya | Oussama Zaid; Algeria |
| Kumite −84 kg | Youssef Badawy; Egypt | Makhtar Diop; Senegal | Daouda Kader Traoré; Burkina Faso |
| Kumite −84 kg | Youssef Badawy; Egypt | Makhtar Diop; Senegal | Mehdi Sriti; Morocco |
| Kumite +84 kg | Houssem Eddine Choiya; Tunisia | Taha Tarek Mahmoud; Egypt | Hocine Daikhi; Algeria |
| Kumite +84 kg | Houssem Eddine Choiya; Tunisia | Taha Tarek Mahmoud; Egypt | Mouhamadou Falilou Diop; Senegal |
| Team kumite | Egypt; Youssef Badawy; Taha Tarek Mahmoud; Moamen Sabry; Abdalla Abdelgawad; Abdalla Abdelaziz; Mohamed Salama | Algeria; Hocine Daikhi; Ousama Zitouni; Falleh Midoune; Oussama Zaid; Ayoub Anis Helassa; Naim Roouichi; Alaa Selmi | Republic of the Congo |
| Team kumite | Egypt; Youssef Badawy; Taha Tarek Mahmoud; Moamen Sabry; Abdalla Abdelgawad; Abdalla Abdelaziz; Mohamed Salama | Algeria; Hocine Daikhi; Ousama Zitouni; Falleh Midoune; Oussama Zaid; Ayoub Anis Helassa; Naim Roouichi; Alaa Selmi | Tunisia; Houssem Edine Choiya; Laith Haddaji; Iheb Ferchichi; Ramez Bouallagui; Mouhib Abid; Nassim Nacef; Youssef Djeridi |

=== Women ===
| Event | Gold | Silver | Bronze |
|---|---|---|---|
| Individual kata | Aya En-Nesyry; Morocco | Aïcha Narimène Dahleb; Algeria | Aya Hesham; Egypt |
| Individual kata | Aya En-Nesyry; Morocco | Aïcha Narimène Dahleb; Algeria | Maxine Willemse; South Africa |
| Team kata | Egypt; Aya Hesham; Asmaa Allam; Noha Amr Antar | Morocco; Aya En-Nesyry; Sanae Agalmam; Marwa Salmi | Algeria; Rayane Salakedji; Aïcha Narimène Dahleb; Aya Ouled El Arabi |
| Team kata | Egypt; Aya Hesham; Asmaa Allam; Noha Amr Antar | Morocco; Aya En-Nesyry; Sanae Agalmam; Marwa Salmi | Botswana; Lethabo Sekano; Amantle Leburu; Lesego Masimola |
| Kumite −50 kg | Yasmin Nasr Elgewily; Egypt | Cylia Ouikene; Algeria | Fenosoa Rakotobe; Madagascar |
| Kumite −50 kg | Yasmin Nasr Elgewily; Egypt | Cylia Ouikene; Algeria | Marinda Roetz; South Africa |
| Kumite −55 kg | Louiza Abouriche; Algeria | Ahlam Youssef; Egypt | Maïmouna Niang; Senegal |
| Kumite −55 kg | Louiza Abouriche; Algeria | Ahlam Youssef; Egypt | Chaimae El Hayti; Morocco |
| Kumite −61 kg | Noursin Aly; Egypt | Wafa Mahjoub; Tunisia | Abigael Mbemba; Republic of the Congo |
| Kumite −61 kg | Noursin Aly; Egypt | Wafa Mahjoub; Tunisia | Chaima Midi; Algeria |
| Kumite −68 kg | Fatima-Zahra Chajai; Morocco | Wissal Ezzar; Tunisia | Karima Mekkaoui; Algeria |
| Kumite −68 kg | Fatima-Zahra Chajai; Morocco | Wissal Ezzar; Tunisia | Lethabo Sekano; Botswana |
| Kumite +68 kg | Menna Shaaban Okila; Egypt | Maroua Eddarhri; Morocco | Chehinez Jemi; Tunisia |
| Kumite +68 kg | Menna Shaaban Okila; Egypt | Maroua Eddarhri; Morocco | Chaïma Oudira; Algeria |
| Team kumite | Egypt; Noursin Aly; Menna Shaaban Okila; Ahlam Youssef; Habiba Hekal | Senegal; Ndéye Yacine Lô; Maïmouna Niang; Aïssatou Simall; Fatou Ndiaye Diop | Republic of the Congo |
| Team kumite | Egypt; Noursin Aly; Menna Shaaban Okila; Ahlam Youssef; Habiba Hekal | Senegal; Ndéye Yacine Lô; Maïmouna Niang; Aïssatou Simall; Fatou Ndiaye Diop | Morocco; Fatima-Zahra Chajai; Maroua Eddarhri; Chaimae El Hayti |

== Medal table ==
| Rank | Nation | Gold | Silver | Bronze | Total |
|---|---|---|---|---|---|
| 1 | Egypt (EGY) | 10 | 2 | 3 | 15 |
| 2 | Algeria (ALG) | 3 | 4 | 7 | 14 |
| 3 | Morocco (MAR) | 2 | 4 | 4 | 10 |
| 4 | Tunisia (TUN) | 1 | 3 | 2 | 6 |
| 5 | Senegal (SEN) | 0 | 2 | 2 | 4 |
| 6 | Libya (LBA) | 0 | 1 | 0 | 1 |
| 7 | Republic of the Congo (CGO) | 0 | 0 | 4 | 4 |
| 7 | South Africa (RSA) | 0 | 0 | 4 | 4 |
| 9 | Botswana (BOT) | 0 | 0 | 2 | 2 |
| 9 | Burkina Faso (BUR) | 0 | 0 | 2 | 2 |
| 11 | Cameroon (CMR) | 0 | 0 | 1 | 1 |
| 11 | Madagascar (MAD) | 0 | 0 | 1 | 1 |
| Totals (12 entries) | | 16 | 16 | 32 | 64 |
