= Karate at the 2021 Islamic Solidarity Games =

- Venue: Karatay Congress and Sport Center
- Location: Konya, Turkey
- Dates: 17–18 August 2022
- Competitors: 226 from 30 nations

Karate at the 2021 Islamic Solidarity Games was held in Konya, Turkey from 17 to 18 August 2022.

== Medal table ==
* Host nation (Turkey)

Rank	Nation	Gold	Silver	Bronze	Total
1	Turkey*	4	2	4	10
2	Morocco	3	1	4	8
3	Kazakhstan	2	0	1	3
3	Uzbekistan	2	0	1	3
5	Azerbaijan	1	2	3	6
6	Jordan	1	0	2	3
6	Saudi Arabia	1	0	2	3
8	Iran	0	5	3	8
9	Algeria	0	2	4	6
10	Kuwait	0	2	0	2
11	Indonesia	0	0	2	2
11	Tunisia	0	0	2	2
Totals (12 entries)		14	14	28	56

== Medalists ==
=== Men ===
Event	Gold	Silver	Bronze
Kata	Ali Sofuoğlu; Turkey	Abolfazl Shahrjerdi; Iran	Ahmad Zigi Zaresta Yuda; Indonesia
Kata	Ali Sofuoğlu; Turkey	Abolfazl Shahrjerdi; Iran	Roman Heydarov; Azerbaijan
Team kata	Turkey; Ali Sofuoğlu; Emre Vefa Göktaş; Enes Özdemir	Kuwait; Mohammad Al-Mosawi; Salman Al-Mosawi; Mohammad Hussain	Iran; Milad Farazmehr; Abolfazl Shahrjerdi; Ali Zand
Team kata	Turkey; Ali Sofuoğlu; Emre Vefa Göktaş; Enes Özdemir	Kuwait; Mohammad Al-Mosawi; Salman Al-Mosawi; Mohammad Hussain	Morocco; Bilal Ben Kacem; Adnnan El Hakimi; Mohammed El Hanni
Kumite −60 kg	Kaisar Alpysbay; Kazakhstan	Abdullah Shaaban; Kuwait	Saud Al-Basher; Saudi Arabia
Kumite −60 kg	Kaisar Alpysbay; Kazakhstan	Abdullah Shaaban; Kuwait	Ayoub Anis Helassa; Algeria
Kumite −67 kg	Sadriddin Saymatov; Uzbekistan	Said Oubaya; Morocco	Tural Aghalarzade; Azerbaijan
Kumite −67 kg	Sadriddin Saymatov; Uzbekistan	Said Oubaya; Morocco	Abdelrahman Al-Masatfa; Jordan
Kumite −75 kg	Anass Alami; Morocco	Ali Asghar Asiabari; Iran	Sultan Al-Zahrani; Saudi Arabia
Kumite −75 kg	Anass Alami; Morocco	Ali Asghar Asiabari; Iran	Hasan Masarweh; Jordan
Kumite −84 kg	Mohammad Al-Jafari; Jordan	Panah Abdullayev; Azerbaijan	Zitouni Eddine; Algeria
Kumite −84 kg	Mohammad Al-Jafari; Jordan	Panah Abdullayev; Azerbaijan	Nabil Ech-Chaabi; Morocco
Kumite +84 kg	Tareg Hamedi; Saudi Arabia	Asiman Gurbanli; Azerbaijan	Fatih Şen; Turkey
Kumite +84 kg	Tareg Hamedi; Saudi Arabia	Asiman Gurbanli; Azerbaijan	Hocine Daikhi; Algeria

=== Women ===
Event	Gold	Silver	Bronze
Kata	Dilara Bozan; Turkey	Fatemeh Sadeghi; Iran	Aya En-Nesyry; Morocco
Kata	Dilara Bozan; Turkey	Fatemeh Sadeghi; Iran	Krisda Putri Aprilia; Indonesia
Team kata	Morocco; Sanae Agalmam; Aya En-Nesyry; Marwa Salmi	Iran; Zainab Al-Sadat Hosseini; Sepideh Amini; Melika Ezzati	Algeria; Aïcha Narimane Dahlab; Sarah Hanouti; Rayane Salakedji
Team kata	Morocco; Sanae Agalmam; Aya En-Nesyry; Marwa Salmi	Iran; Zainab Al-Sadat Hosseini; Sepideh Amini; Melika Ezzati	Turkey; Zehra Kaya; Damla Pelit; Damla Su Türemen
Kumite −50 kg	Chaimae El Hayti; Morocco	Cylia Ouikene; Algeria	Serap Özçelik; Turkey
Kumite −50 kg	Chaimae El Hayti; Morocco	Cylia Ouikene; Algeria	Sara Bahmanyar; Iran
Kumite −55 kg	Tuba Yakan; Turkey	Louiza Abouriche; Algeria	Sevinch Rakhimova; Uzbekistan
Kumite −55 kg	Tuba Yakan; Turkey	Louiza Abouriche; Algeria	Madina Sadigova; Azerbaijan
Kumite −61 kg	Zulkhumor Tursunalieva; Uzbekistan	Gülbahar Gözütok; Turkey	Wafa Mahjoub; Tunisia
Kumite −61 kg	Zulkhumor Tursunalieva; Uzbekistan	Gülbahar Gözütok; Turkey	Assel Kanay; Kazakhstan
Kumite −68 kg	Irina Zaretska; Azerbaijan	Mobina Heidari; Iran	Nissrine Brouk; Morocco
Kumite −68 kg	Irina Zaretska; Azerbaijan	Mobina Heidari; Iran	Eda Eltemur; Turkey
Kumite +68 kg	Sofya Berultseva; Kazakhstan	Meltem Hocaoğlu; Turkey	Chehinez Jemi; Tunisia
Kumite +68 kg	Sofya Berultseva; Kazakhstan	Meltem Hocaoğlu; Turkey	Leila Borjali; Iran

== Participating nations ==
226 athletes from 30 countries participated:

1. Afghanistan (2)
2. Albania (1)
3. Algeria (16)
4. Azerbaijan (15)
5. Bangladesh (4)
6. Benin (1)
7. Cameroon (7)
8. Chad (8)
9. Guinea (2)
10. Indonesia (10)
11. Iran (17)
12. Jordan (7)
13. Kazakhstan (10)
14. Kuwait (8)
15. Kyrgyzstan (9)
16. Malaysia (11)
17. Mauritania (2)
18. Morocco (14)
19. Pakistan (7)
20. Palestine (1)
21. Qatar (4)
22. Saudi Arabia (8)
23. Senegal (8)
24. Tajikistan (5)
25. Tunisia (4)
26. Turkey (17)
27. Turkmenistan (9)
28. United Arab Emirates (7)
29. Uzbekistan (10)
30. Yemen (2)

== Gallery ==
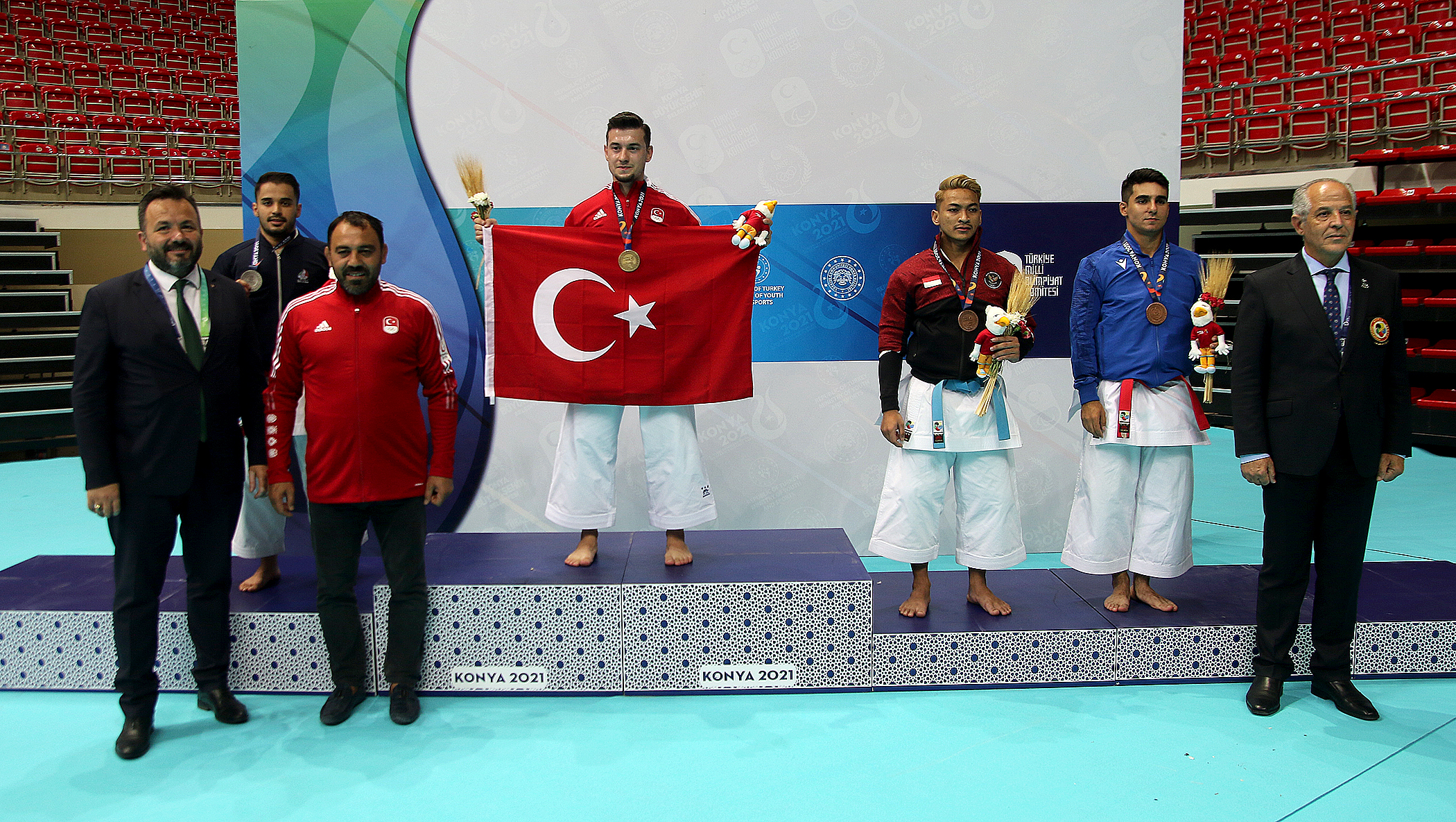
Men Kata Medal Ceremony

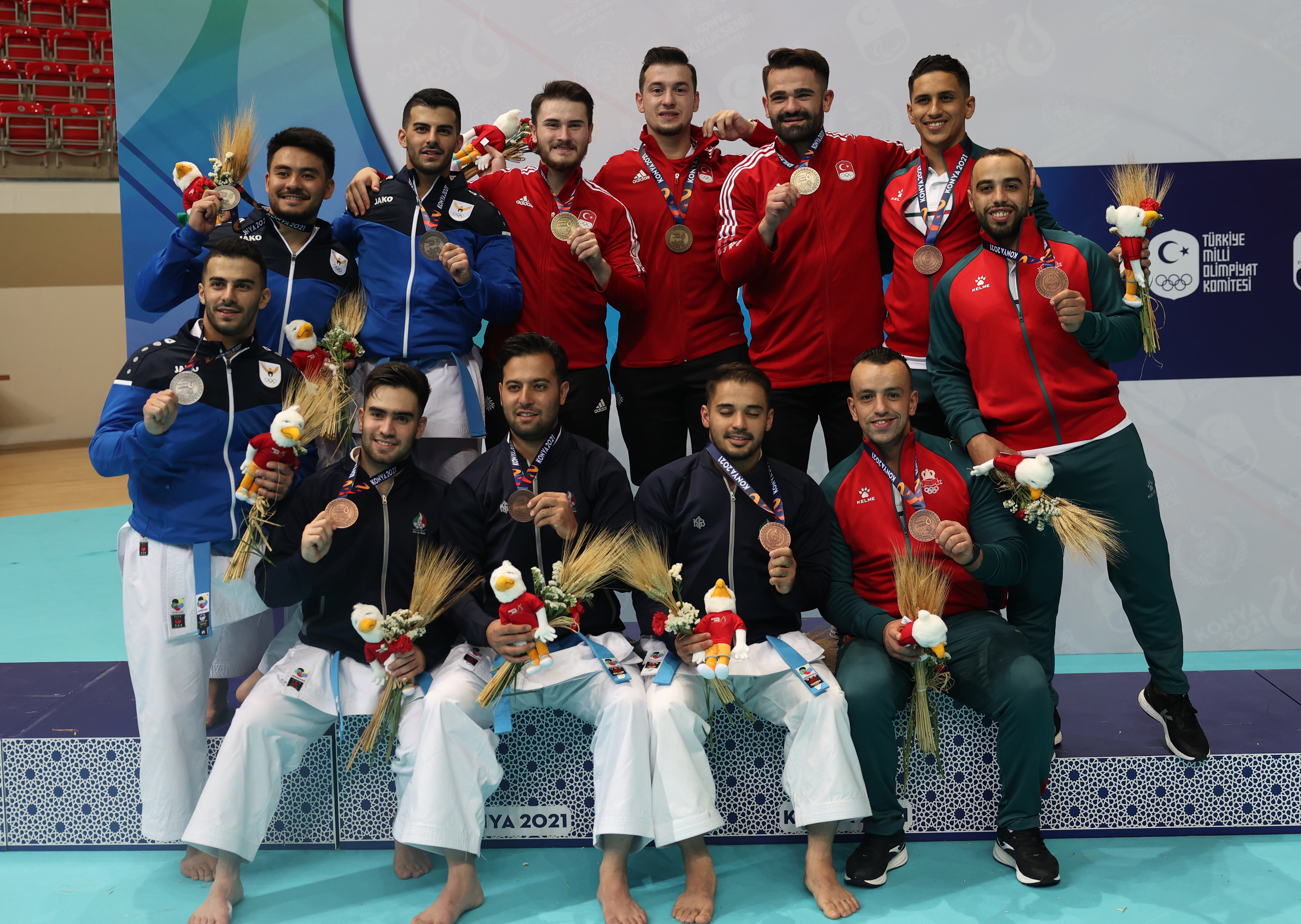
Men Team Kata Medal ceremony

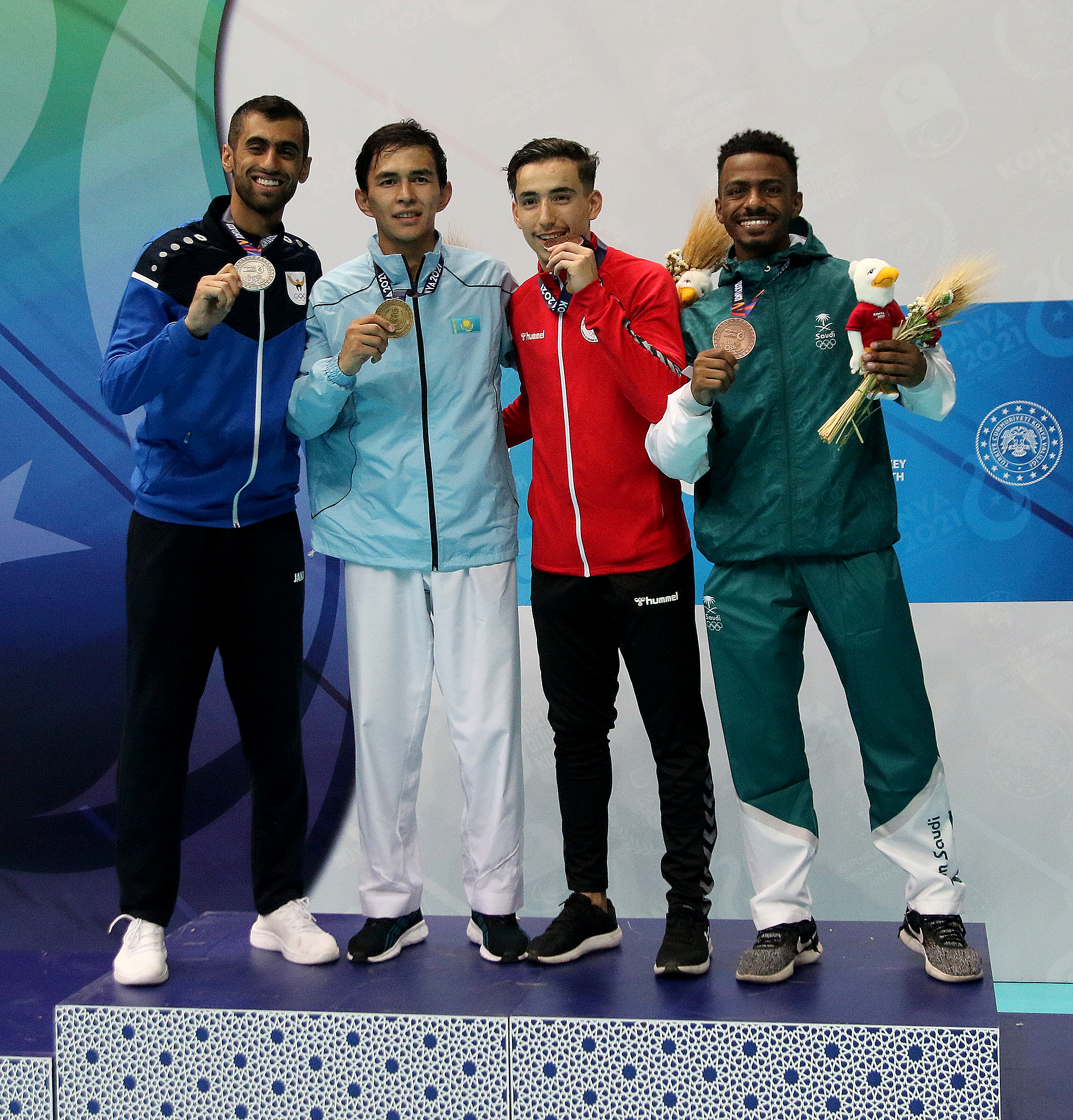
Men Kumite 60 kg Medal Ceremony

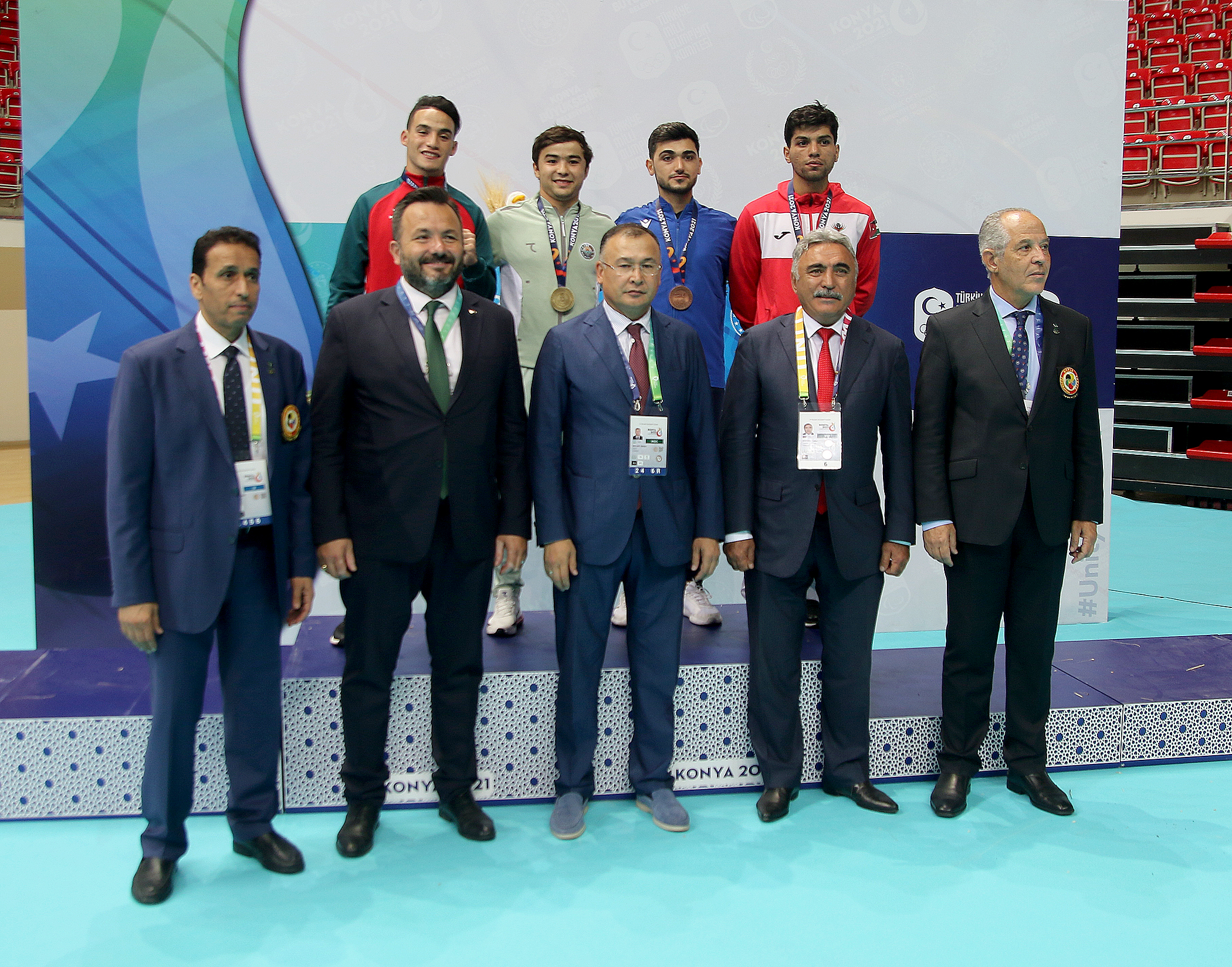
Men Kumite 67 kg Medal Ceremony

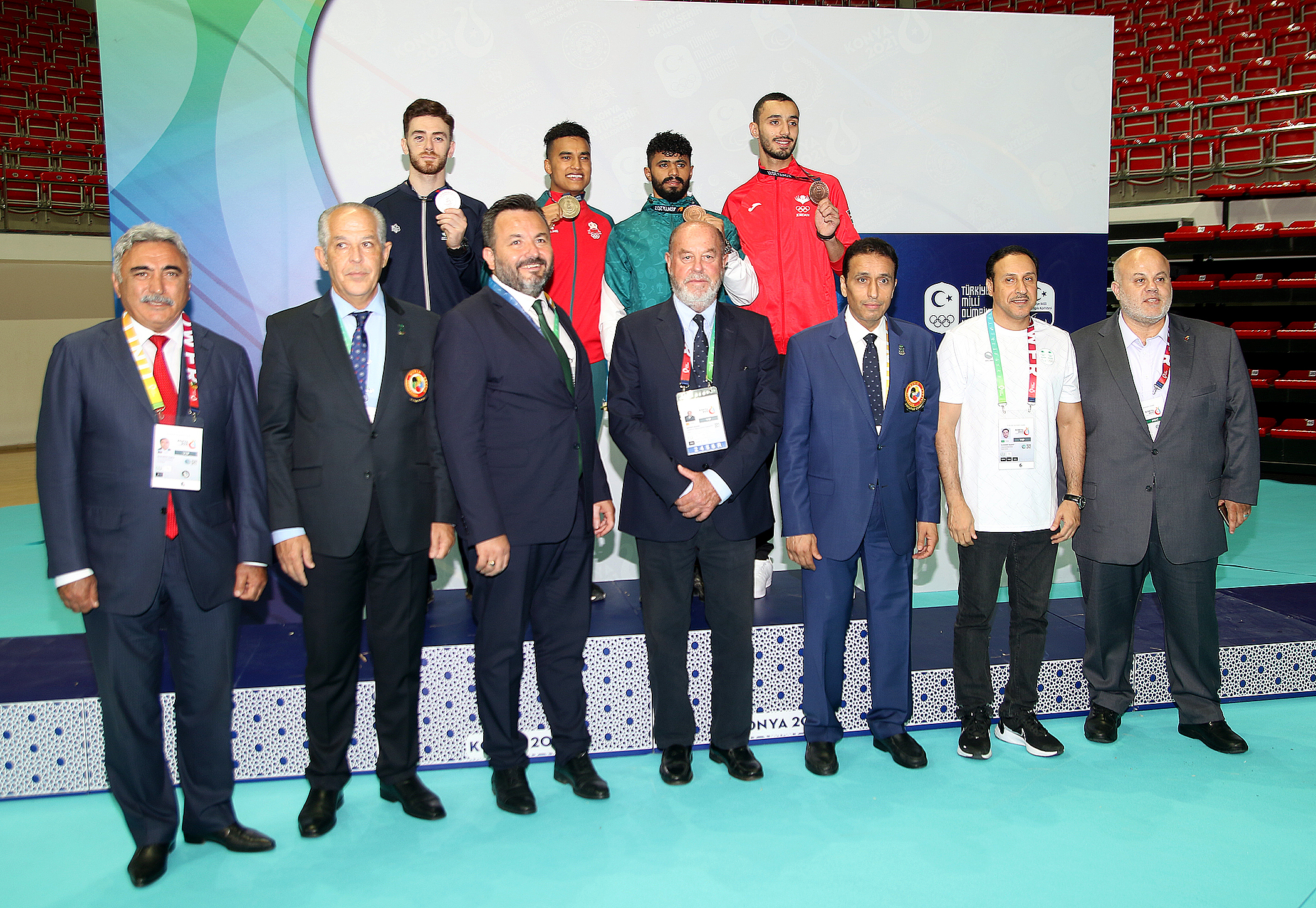
Men Kumite 75 kg Medal Ceremony

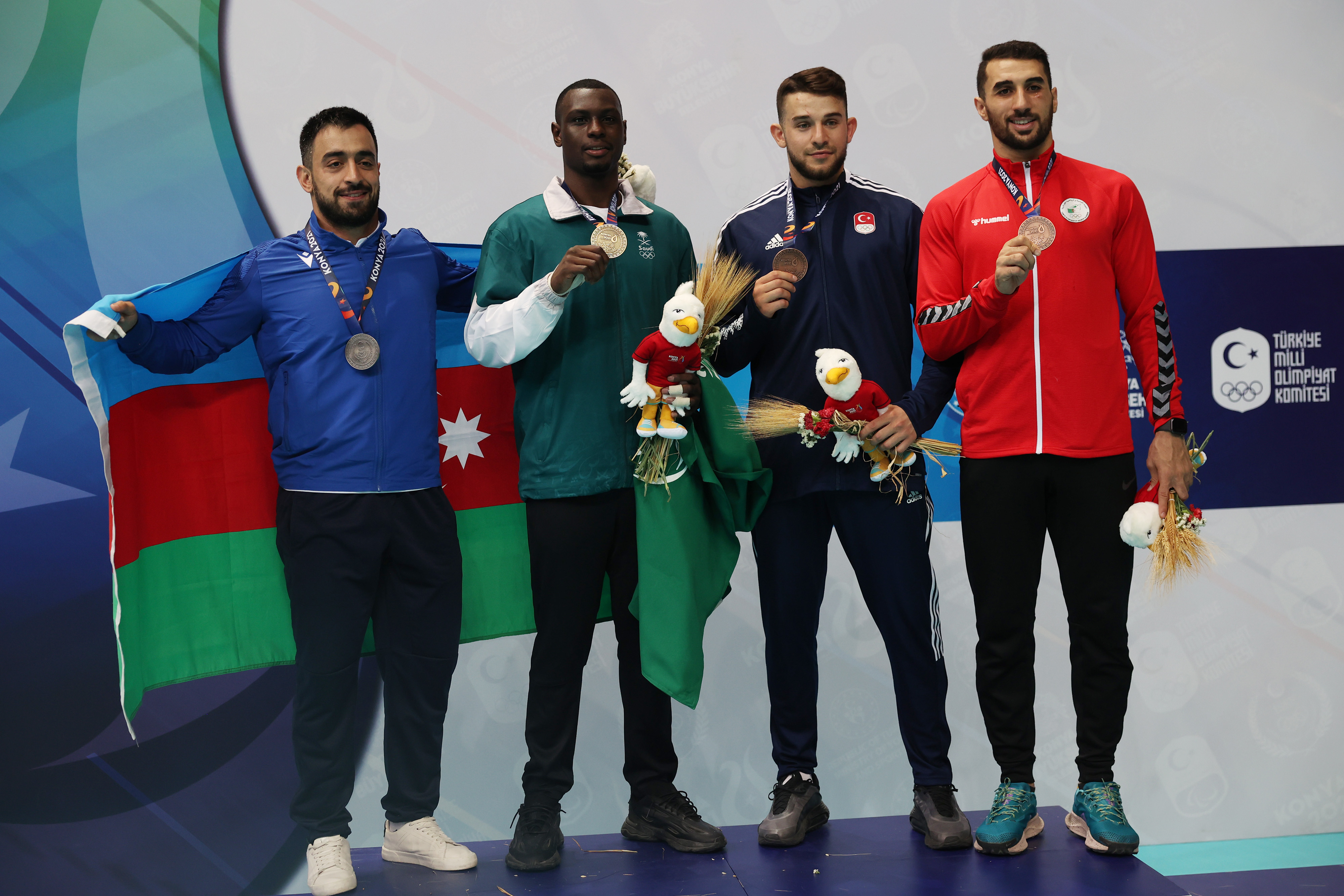
Men Kumite 84 kg Medal Ceremony

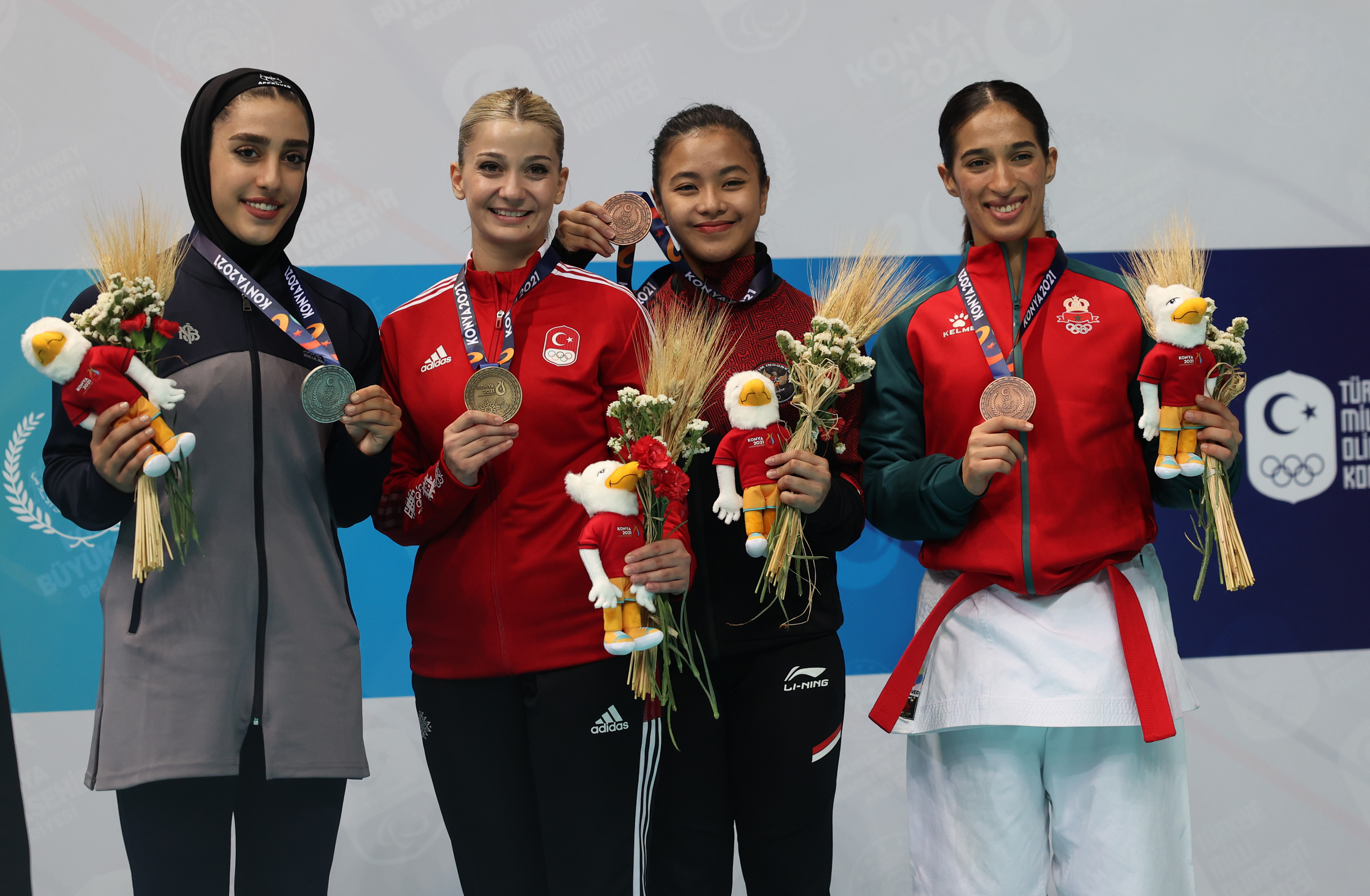
Women Kata Medal ceremony

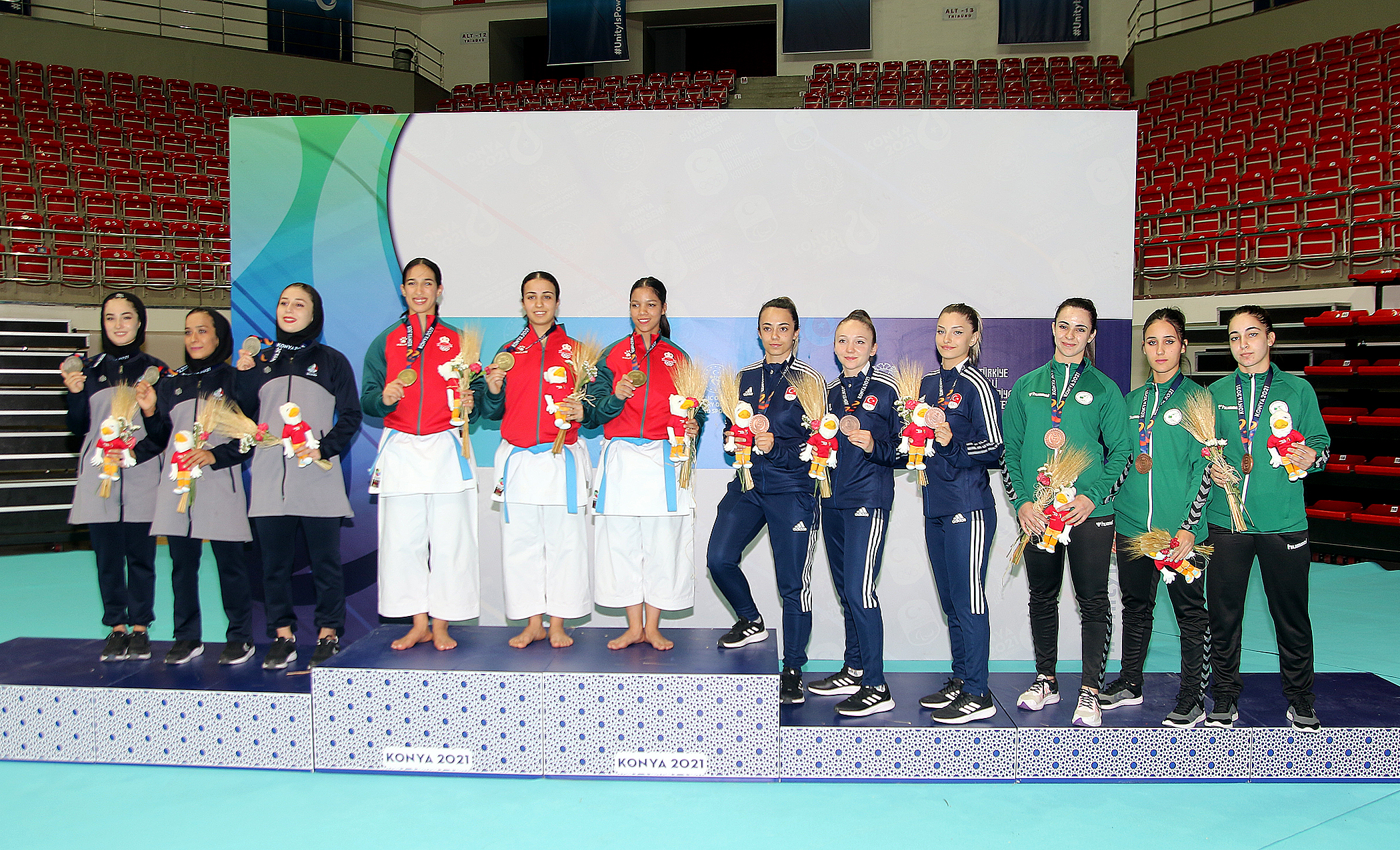
Women Kata Team Medal Ceremony

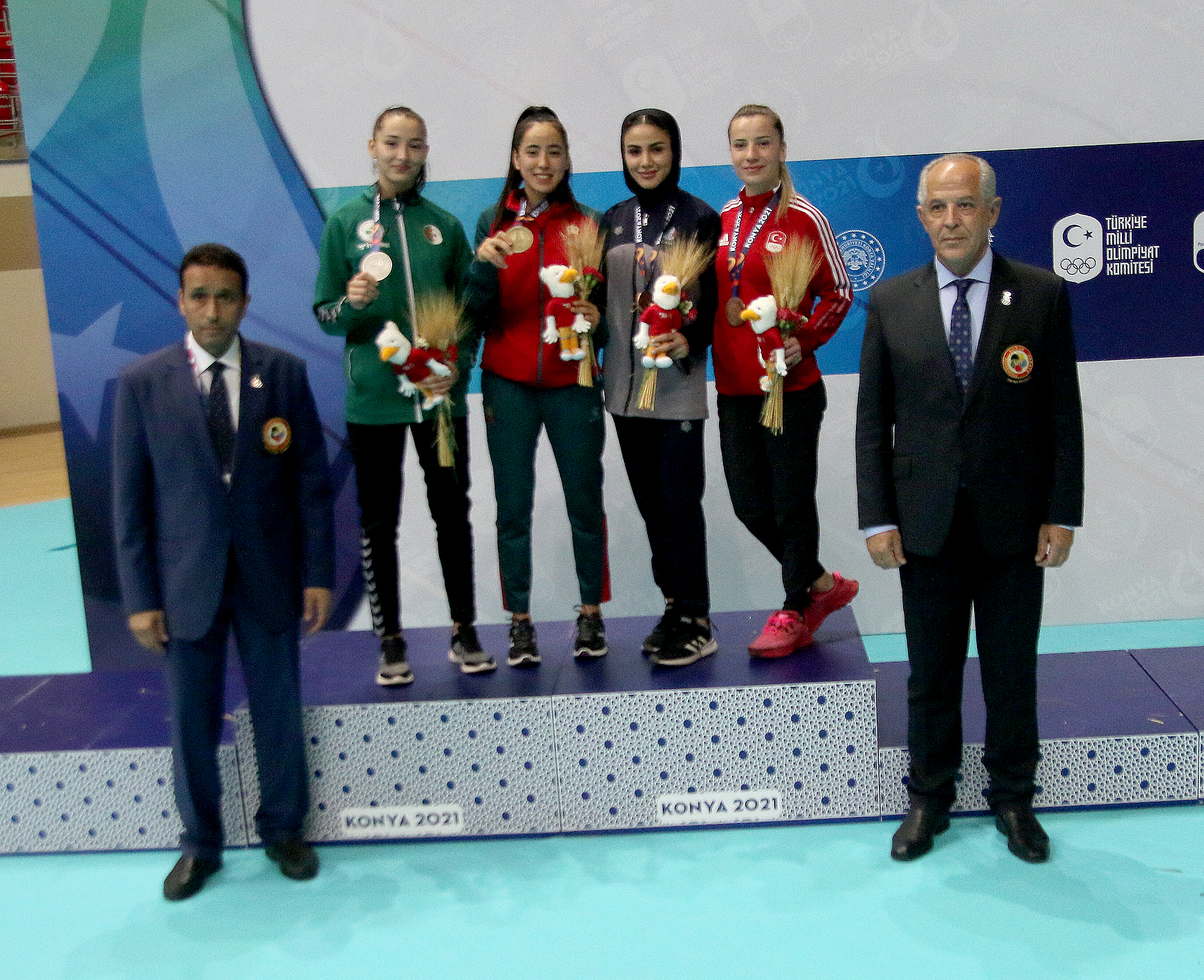
Women Kumite 50 kg Medal Ceremony

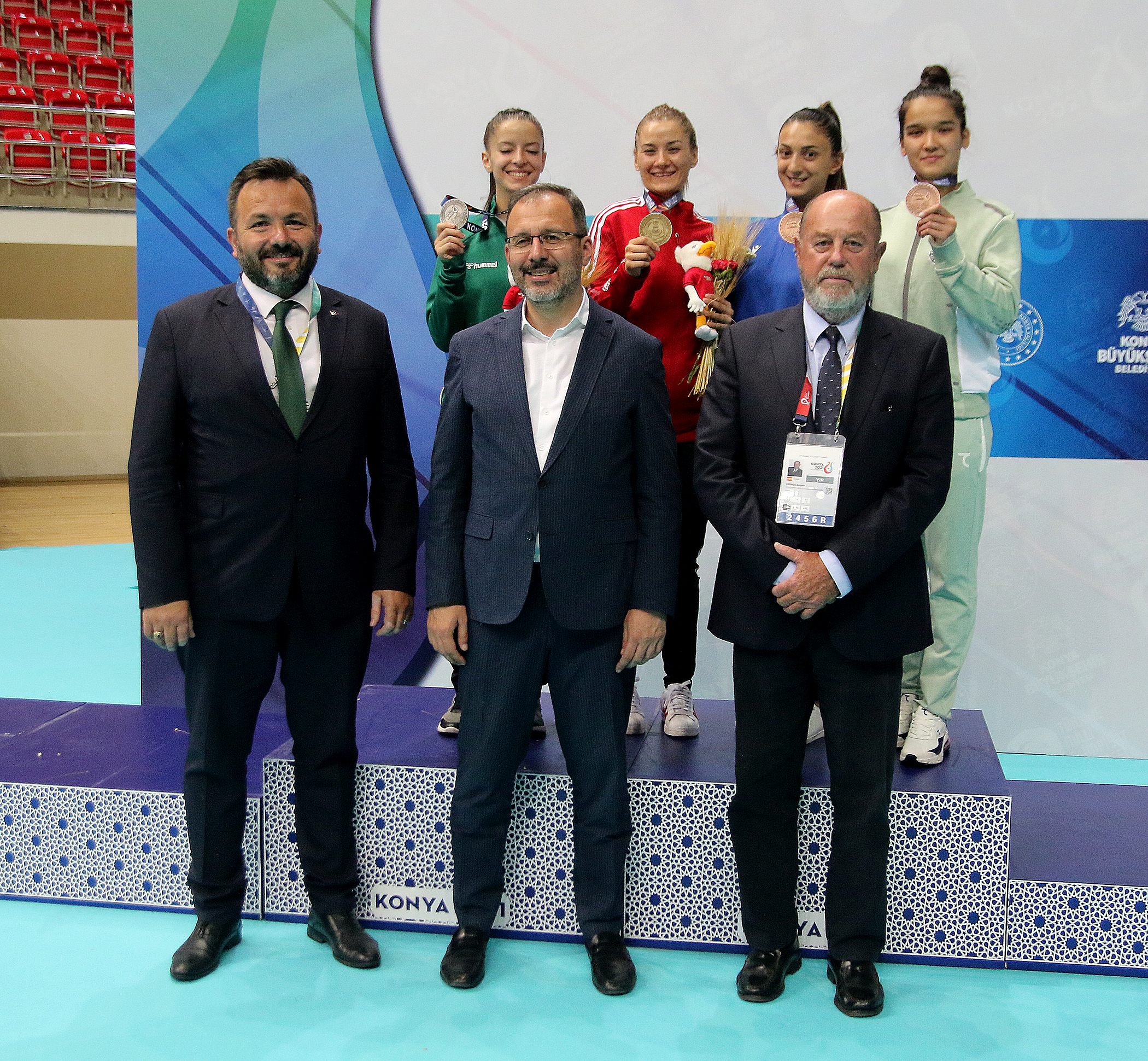
Women Kumite 55 kg Medal Ceremony

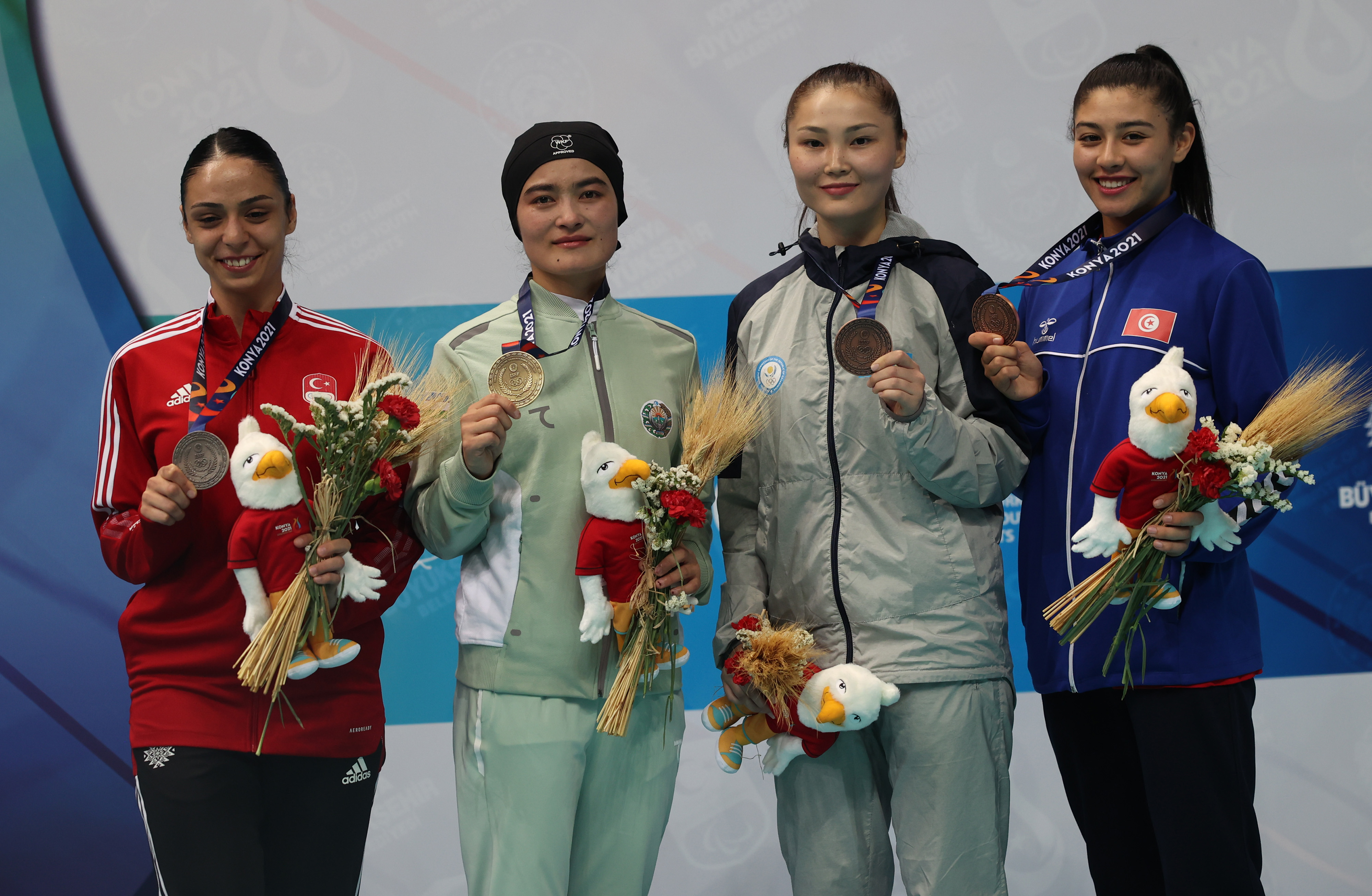
Women Kumite 61 kg Medal Ceremony

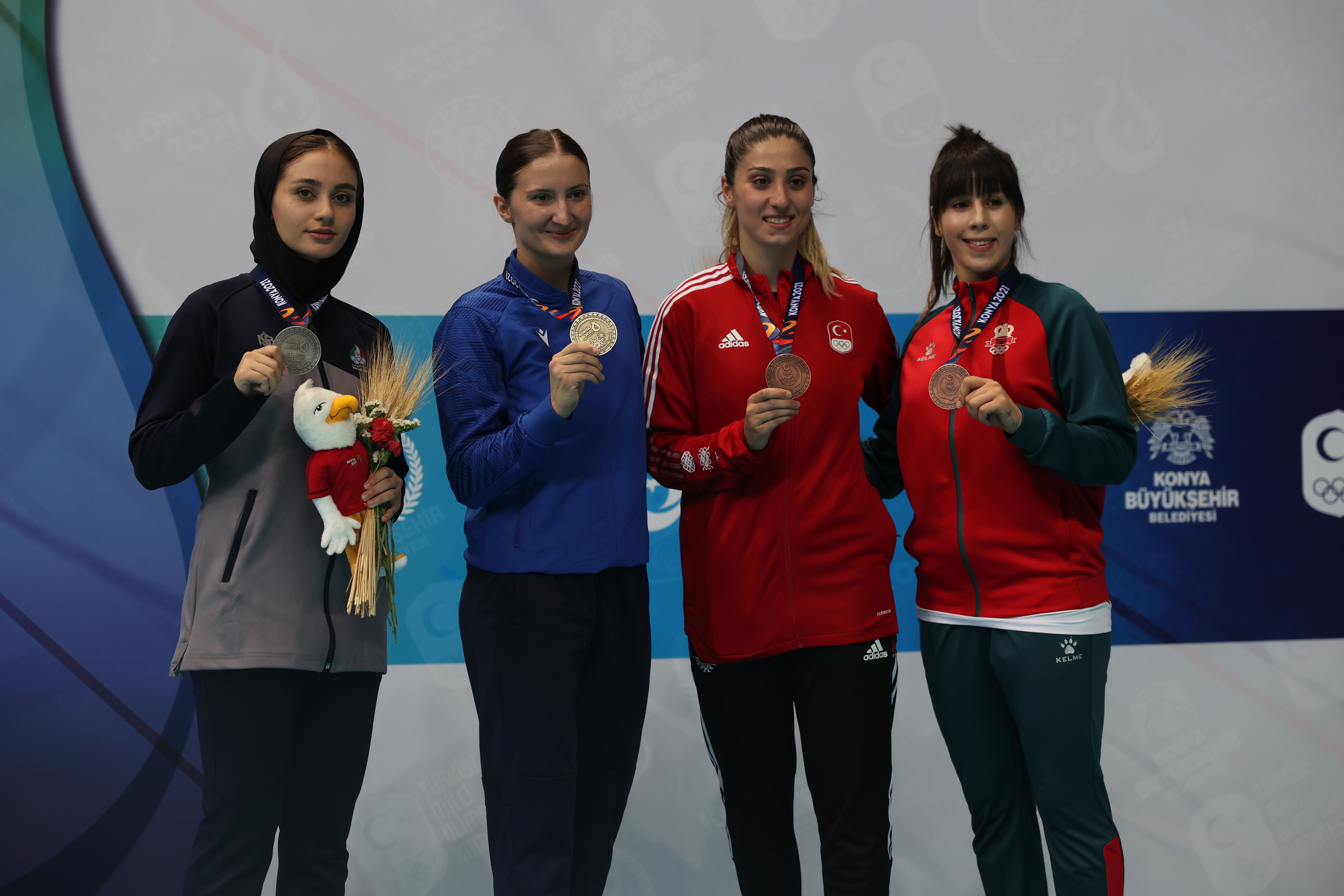
Women Kumite -68 kg Medal Ceremony

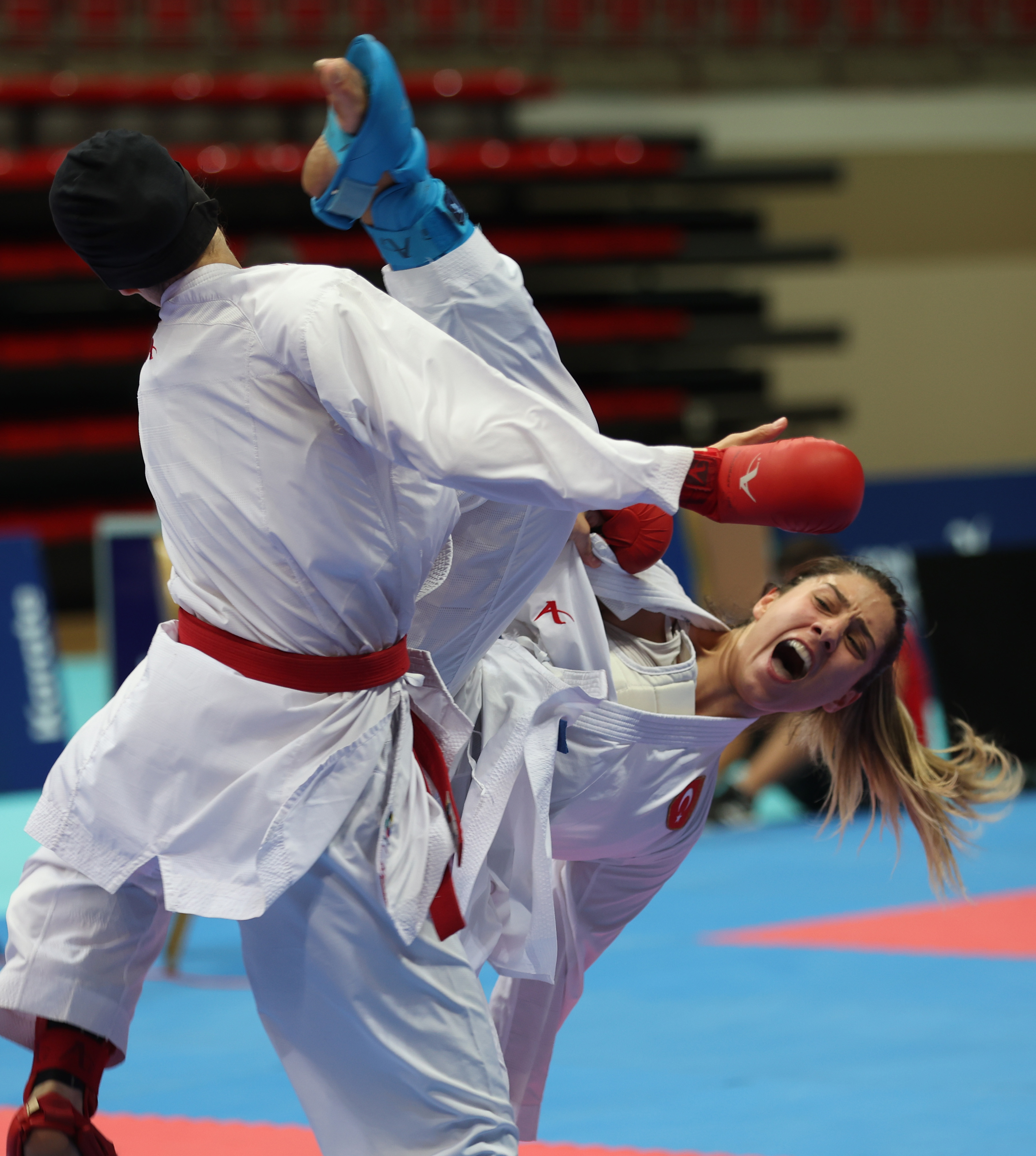
Women Kumite

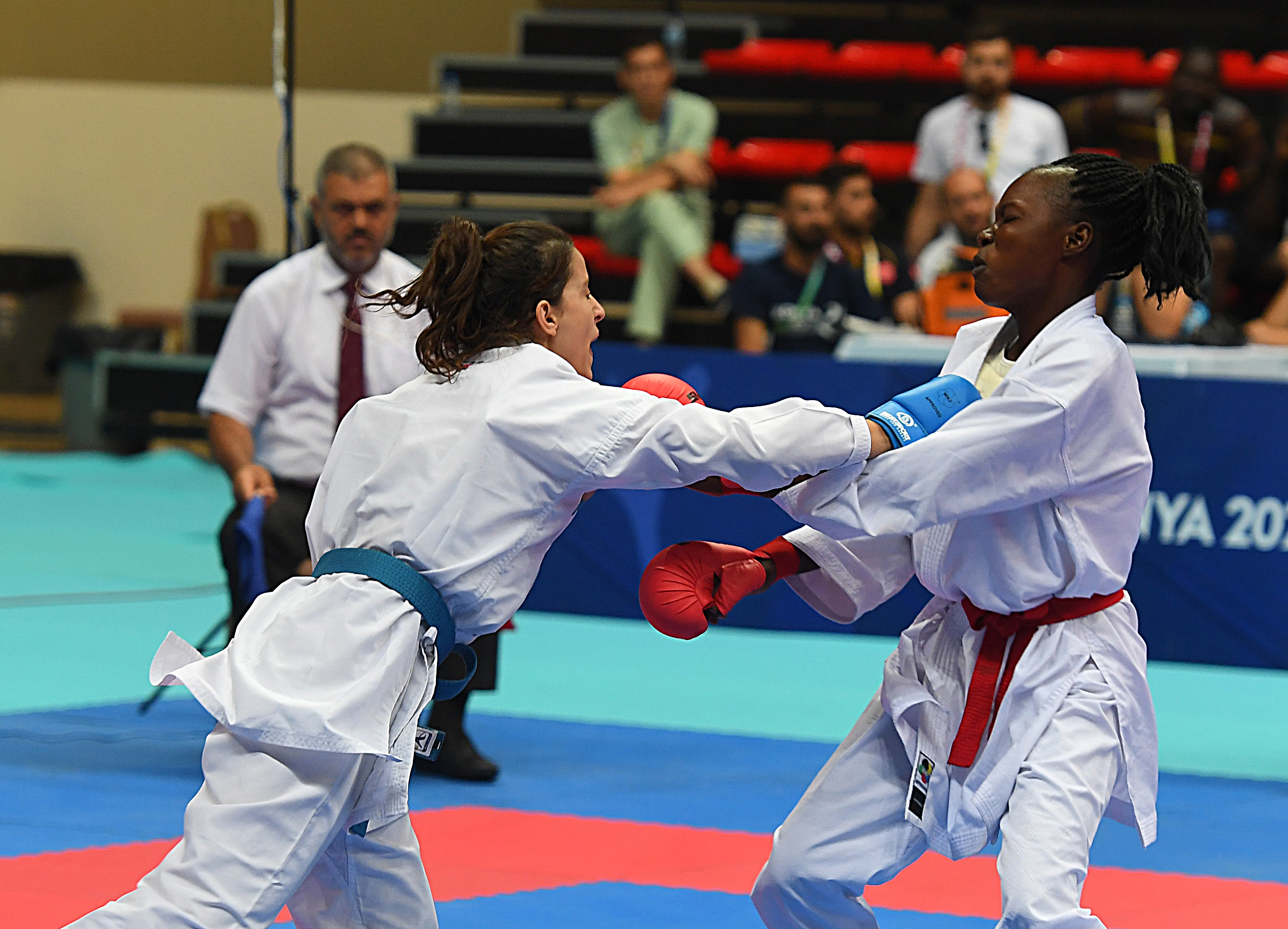
Women Kumite

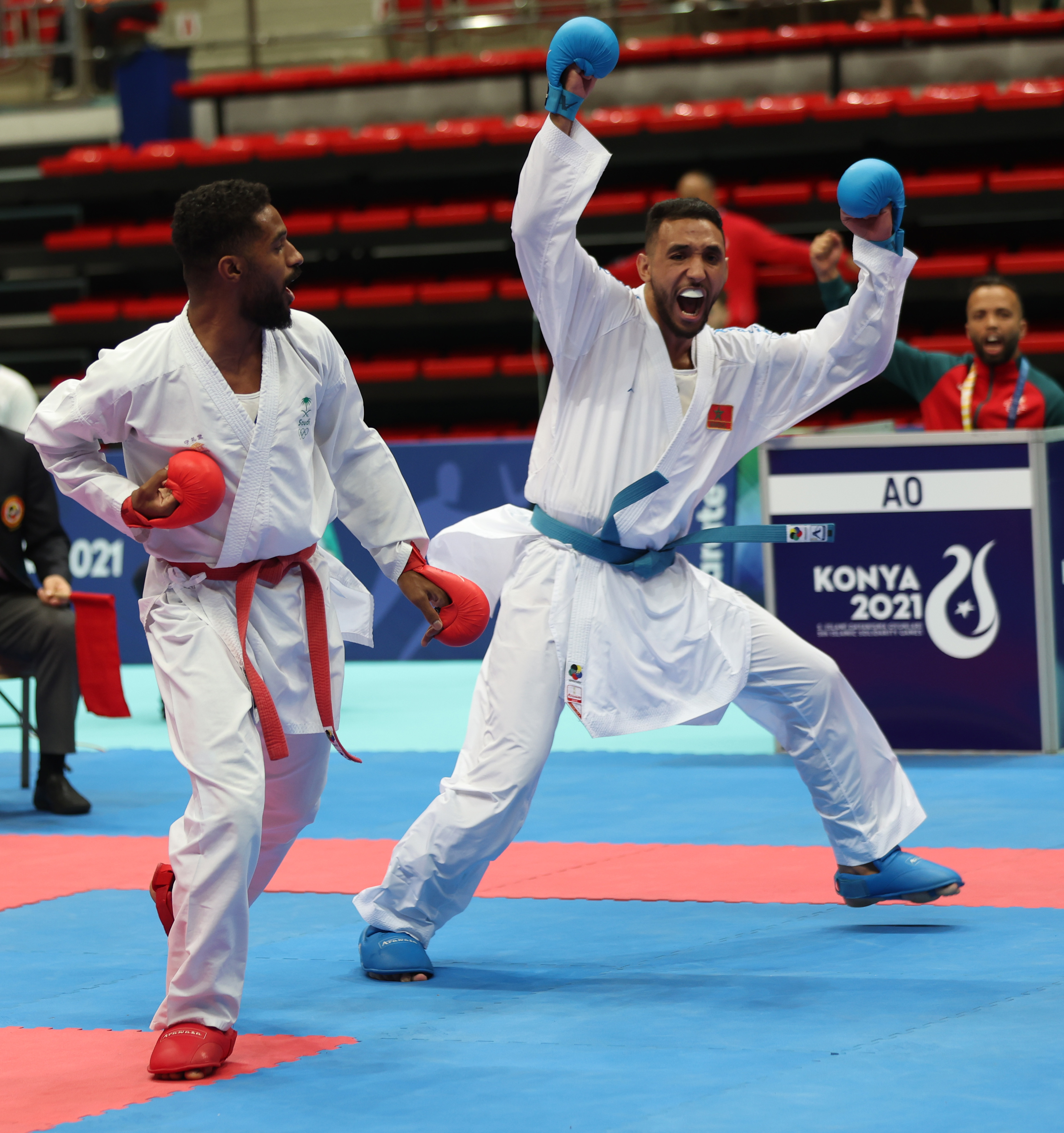
Men Kumite

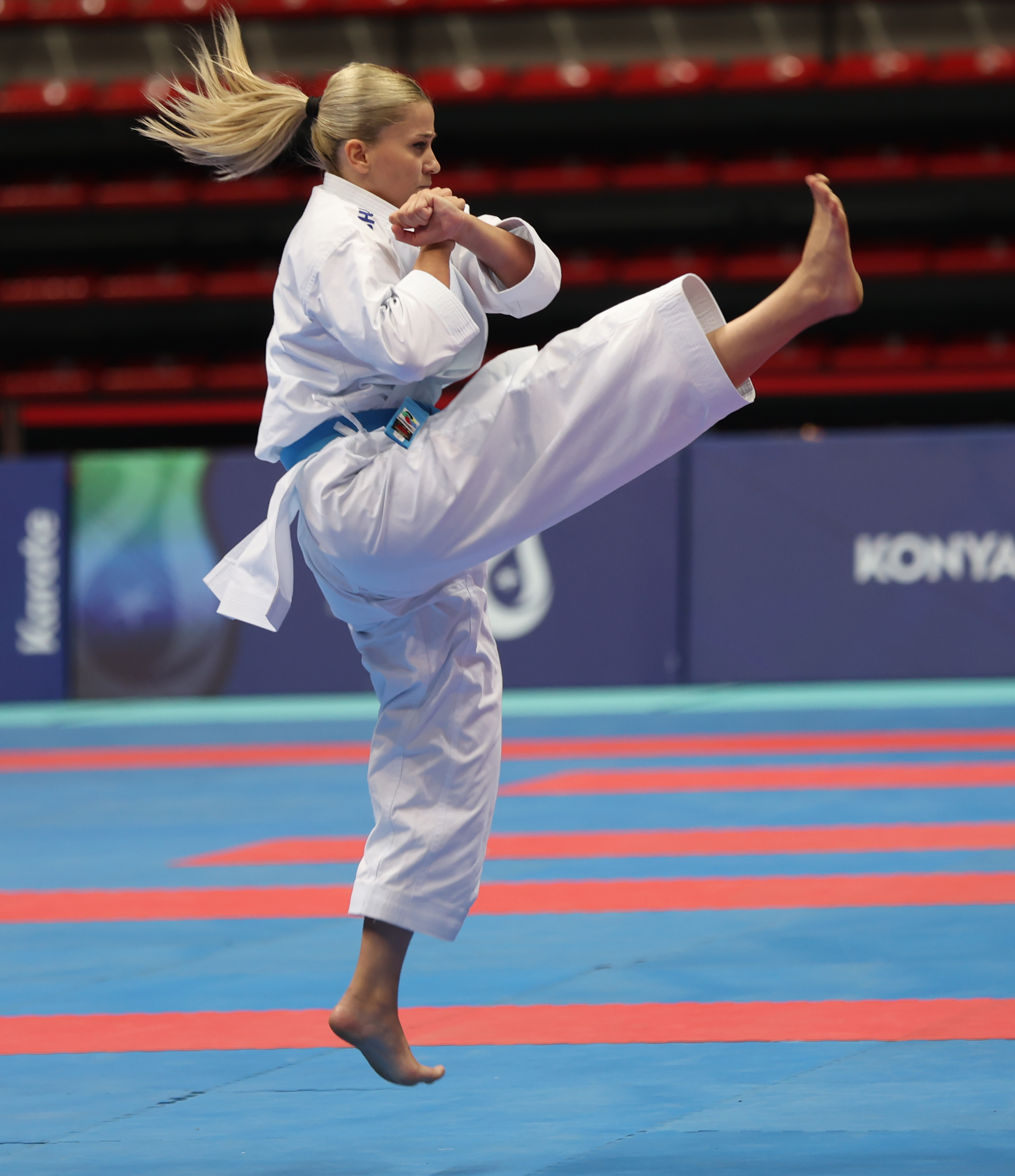
Women Kata

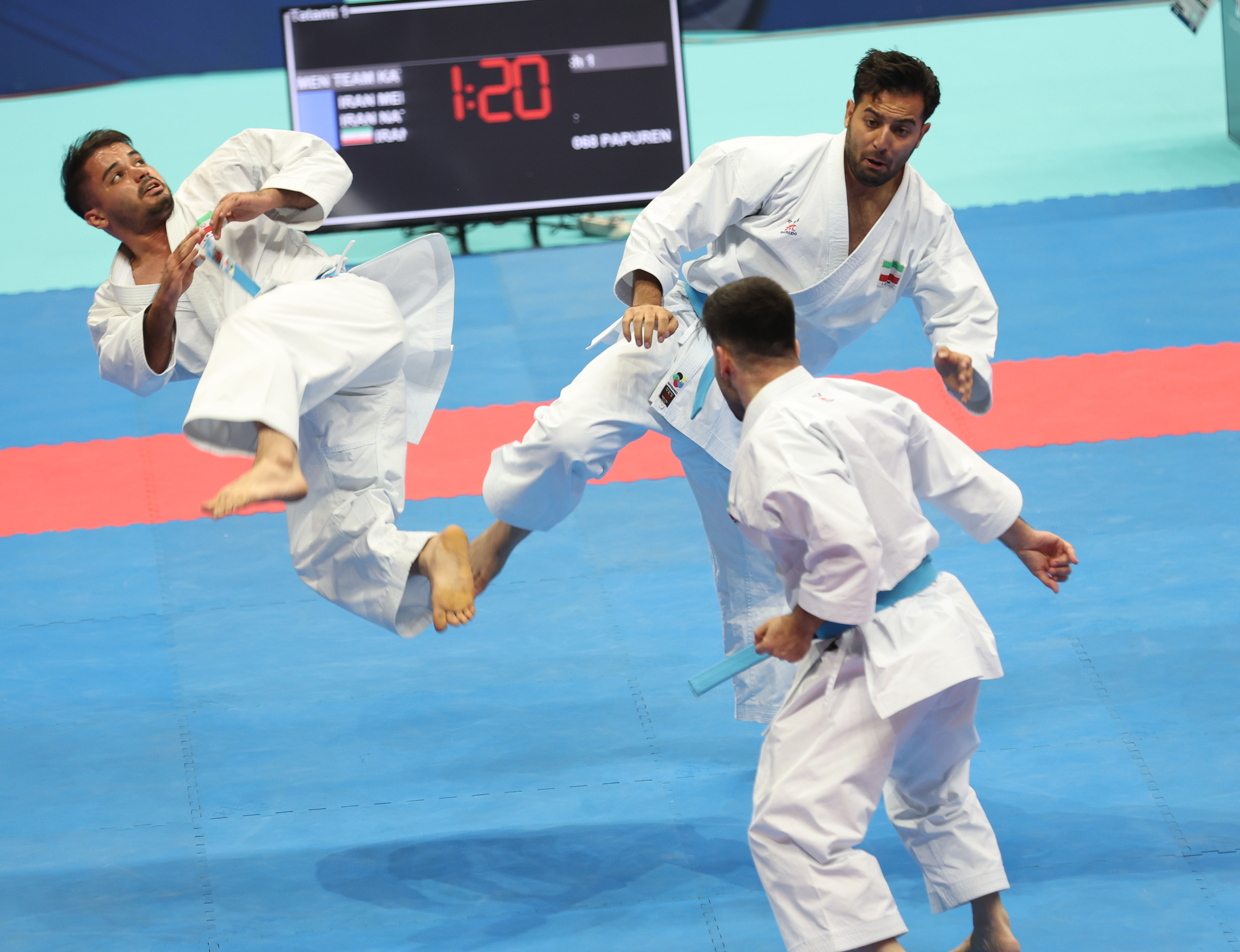
Men Team Kata

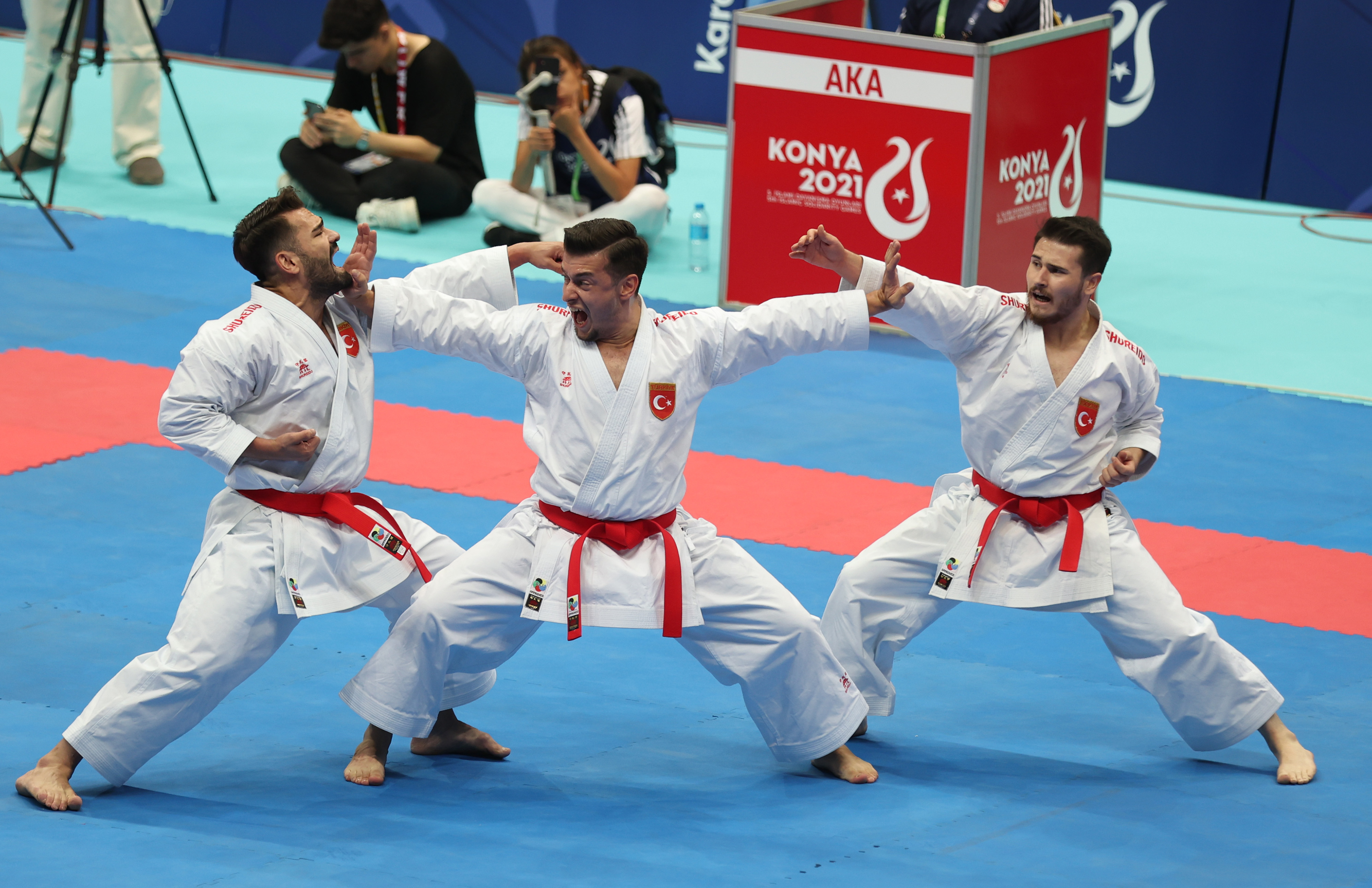
Men Team Kata
