= Cylia Ouikene =

Algerian karateka

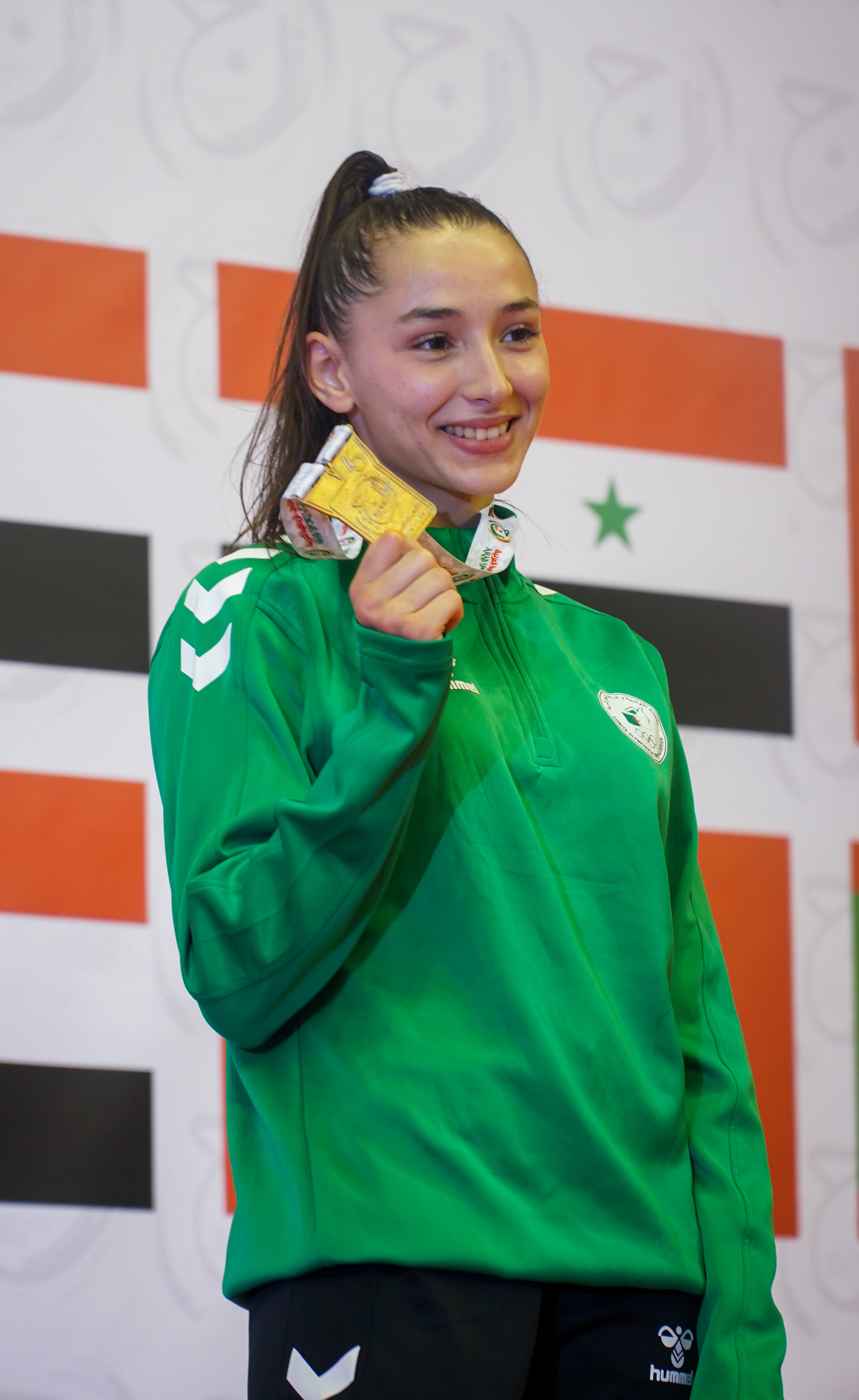

Personal information
- Born: 7 September 2003 (age 23)

Sport
- Country: Algeria
- Sport: Karate
- Weight class: 50 kg
- Events: Kumite; Team kumite
Medal record
Women's karate
Representing Algeria
Event	1st	2nd	3rd
African Games	0	1	0
African Karate Championships	5	2	1
Mediterranean Games	2	0	0
Islamic Solidarity Games	0	1	0
Arab Games	1	0	0
U21 World Championship	1	0	0
Total	9	4	1
African Games
Silver medal – second place	2023 Accra	Kumite 50 kg
African Championships
Gold medal – first place	2021 Cairo	Kumite 50 kg
Gold medal – first place	2022 Durban	Team Kumite
Gold medal – first place	2023 Casablanca	Team Kumite
Gold medal – first place	2025 Abuja	Kumite 50 kg
Gold medal – first place	2026 Algiers	Kumite 50 kg
Silver medal – second place	2022 Durban	Kumite 50 kg
Silver medal – second place	2021 Cairo	Team kumite
Bronze medal – third place	2023 Casablanca	Kumite 50 kg
U21 World Championship
Gold medal – first place	2022 Konya	Kumite 50 kg
Mediterranean Games
Gold medal – first place	2022 Oran	Kumite 50 kg
Gold medal – first place	2026 Taranto	Kumite 50 kg
Islamic Solidarity Games
Silver medal – second place	2021 Konya	Kumite 50 kg
Arab Games
Gold medal – first place	2023 Algiers	Kumite 50 kg

Cylia Ouikene (Arabic: سيلية ويكان, born 7 September 2003) is an Algerian karateka. She won the gold medal in the women's 50 kg event at the 2022 Mediterranean Games held in Oran, Algeria. She won the silver medal in the women's 50 kg event at the 2021 Islamic Solidarity Games held in Konya, Turkey.

Ouikene competed in the women's 50 kg event at the 2021 World Karate Championships held in Dubai, United Arab Emirates. She won the gold medal in her event at the 2021 African Karate Championships held in Cairo, Egypt. She also won the silver medal in the women's team kumite event.

In 2023, Ouikene won the gold medal in her event at the Arab Games held in Algiers, Algeria. She competed in the women's 50 kg event at the 2023 World Karate Championships held in Budapest, Hungary.

In 2024, she won the silver medal in her event at the 2023 African Games held in Accra, Ghana.

== Achievements ==
Year	Competition	Venue	Rank	Event
2021	African Karate Championships	Cairo, Egypt	1st	Kumite 50 kg
2021	African Karate Championships	Cairo, Egypt	2nd	Team kumite
2022	Mediterranean Games	Oran, Algeria	1st	Kumite 50 kg
2022	Islamic Solidarity Games	Konya, Turkey	2nd	Kumite 50 kg
2023	Arab Games	Algiers, Algeria	1st	Kumite 50 kg
2024	African Games	Accra, Ghana	2nd	Kumite 50 kg
2026	Mediterranean Games	Taranto, Italy	1st	Kumite 50 kg
