= Nissrine Brouk =

Moroccan karateka

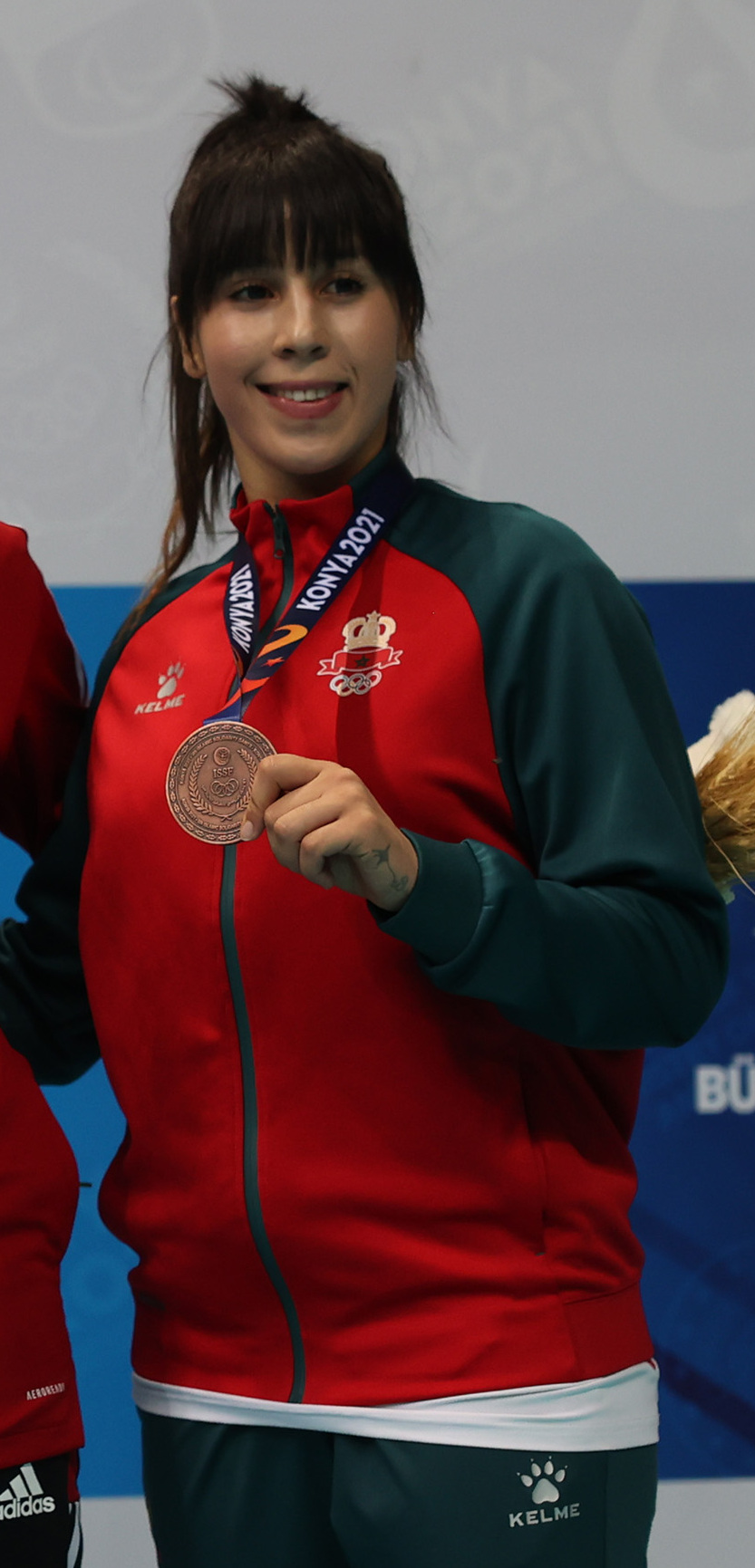
- Brouk in 2021

Sport
- Country: Morocco
- Sport: Karate
- Weight class: 68 kg
- Event: Kumite
Medal record
Women's karate
Representing Morocco
African Games
Gold medal – first place	2019 Rabat	Kumite 68 kg
Arab Games
Gold medal – first place	2023 Algiers	Kumite 68 kg
Islamic Solidarity Games
Bronze medal – third place	2021 Konya	Kumite 68 kg
Mediterranean Games
Bronze medal – third place	2022 Oran	Kumite 68 kg

Nissrine Brouk, sometimes written Nisrine Brouk, is a Moroccan karateka. She won the gold medal in the women's 68 kg event at the 2019 African Games held in Rabat, Morocco.

== Career ==
In 2021, she competed in the women's 68 kg event at the World Karate Championships held in Dubai, United Arab Emirates. She was eliminated in the repechage by eventual bronze medalist Alizée Agier of France.

She won one of the bronze medals in the women's 68 kg event at the Mediterranean Games held in Oran, Algeria. She also won one of the bronze medals in the women's 68 kg event at the 2021 Islamic Solidarity Games held in Konya, Turkey.

In 2023, she competed in the women's 68 kg event at the World Karate Championships held in Budapest, Hungary. She was eliminated in her fourth match by Alizée Agier of France.

== Achievements ==
Year	Competition	Venue	Rank	Event
2019	African Games	Rabat, Morocco	1st	Kumite 68 kg
2022	Mediterranean Games	Oran, Algeria	3rd	Kumite 68 kg
2022	Islamic Solidarity Games	Konya, Turkey	3rd	Kumite 68 kg
2023	Arab Games	Algiers, Algeria	1st	Kumite 68 kg
