= Libya at the 2023 African Games =

- Flag of Libya
- IOC code: LBA
- NOC: Libyan Olympic Committee

in Accra, Ghana 8 March 2024 – 23 March 2024
- Competitors: 14 in 8 sports
- Medals Ranked 22nd: Gold 1 Silver 11 Bronze 1 Total 13

African Games appearances
- 1978; 1987; 1991; 1995; 1999; 2003; 2007; 2011; 2015; 2019; 2023; 2027

Libya competed at the 2023 African Games held from 8 to 23 March 2024 in Accra, Ghana. Libya competed in eight sports.

== Medal table ==
Medal	Name	Sport	Event	Date
Gold	Mohammed Alzintani	Weightlifting	Men's 81 kg snatch	12 March
Silver	Mohamed Abudabous	Karate	Men's kumite −75 kg	7 March
Silver	Ahsaan Shabi	Weightlifting	Men's 73 kg total	11 March
Silver	Ahsaan Shabi	Weightlifting	Men's 73 kg snatch	11 March
Silver	Ahsaan Shabi	Weightlifting	Men's 73 kg clean & jerk	11 March
Silver	Mohammed Alzintani	Weightlifting	Men's 81 kg total	12 March
Silver	Mohammed Alzintani	Weightlifting	Men's 81 kg clean & jerk	12 March
Silver	Omar Alajeemi	Weightlifting	Men's 89 kg total	12 March
Silver	Omar Alajeemi	Weightlifting	Men's 89 kg snatch	12 March
Silver	Omar Alajeemi	Weightlifting	Men's 89 kg clean & jerk	12 March
Silver	Ahmed Abuzriba	Weightlifting	Men's 102 kg total	13 March
Silver	Ahmed Abuzriba	Weightlifting	Men's 102 kg snatch	13 March
Bronze	Ahmed Abuzriba	Weightlifting	Men's 102 kg clean & jerk	13 March
