= Karate at the 2022 Mediterranean Games – Women's 55 kg =

Women's kumite 55 kg at the 2022 Mediterranean Games
- Venue: Mohammed ben Ahmed CCO Hall 03 and 06
- Date: 26 June
- Competitors: 13 from 13 nations

Medalists
gold medal	Louiza Abouriche	Algeria
silver medal	Ahlam Youssef	Egypt
bronze medal	Veronica Brunori	Italy
bronze medal	Tuba Yakan	Turkey

The women's 55 kg competition in karate at the 2022 Mediterranean Games was held on 26 June at the Mohammed ben Ahmed CCO Hall 03 and 06 in Oran.

== Results ==
=== Bracket ===
Round of 16
Carlota Fernández (ESP)	0
Veronica Brunori (ITA)	2
Louiza Abouriche (ALG)	4
Alessandra Hasani (CRO)	2
Asma Charif (FRA)	5
Paola Kostić (BIH)	2
Farida Mrabet Lemti (MAR)	0
Ahlam Youssef (EGY)	6
Constança Matos (POR)	1
Tuba Yakan (TUR)	7

Quarterfinals
Veronica Brunori (ITA)	2
Louiza Abouriche (ALG)	9
Asma Charif (FRA)	0
Albulenë Gërvalla (KOS)	3
Ahlam Youssef (EGY)	7
Arianne Gonzales (CYP)	1
Tuba Yakan (TUR)	8
Shirine Zarati (TUN)	0

Semifinals
Louiza Abouriche (ALG)	7
Albulenë Gërvalla (KOS)	0
Ahlam Youssef (EGY)	8
Tuba Yakan (TUR)	0

Final
Louiza Abouriche (ALG)	4
Ahlam Youssef (EGY)	1

=== Repechage ===
Repechage
Alessandra Hasani (CRO)	1
Veronica Brunori (ITA)	2

Bronze medal
Veronica Brunori (ITA)	2
Albulenë Gërvalla (KOS)	1

Repechage
Farida Mrabet Lemti (MAR)	2
Arianne Gonzales (CYP)	2

Bronze medal
Arianne Gonzales (CYP)	0
Tuba Yakan (TUR)	0
