= Louiza Abouriche =

Algerian karateka

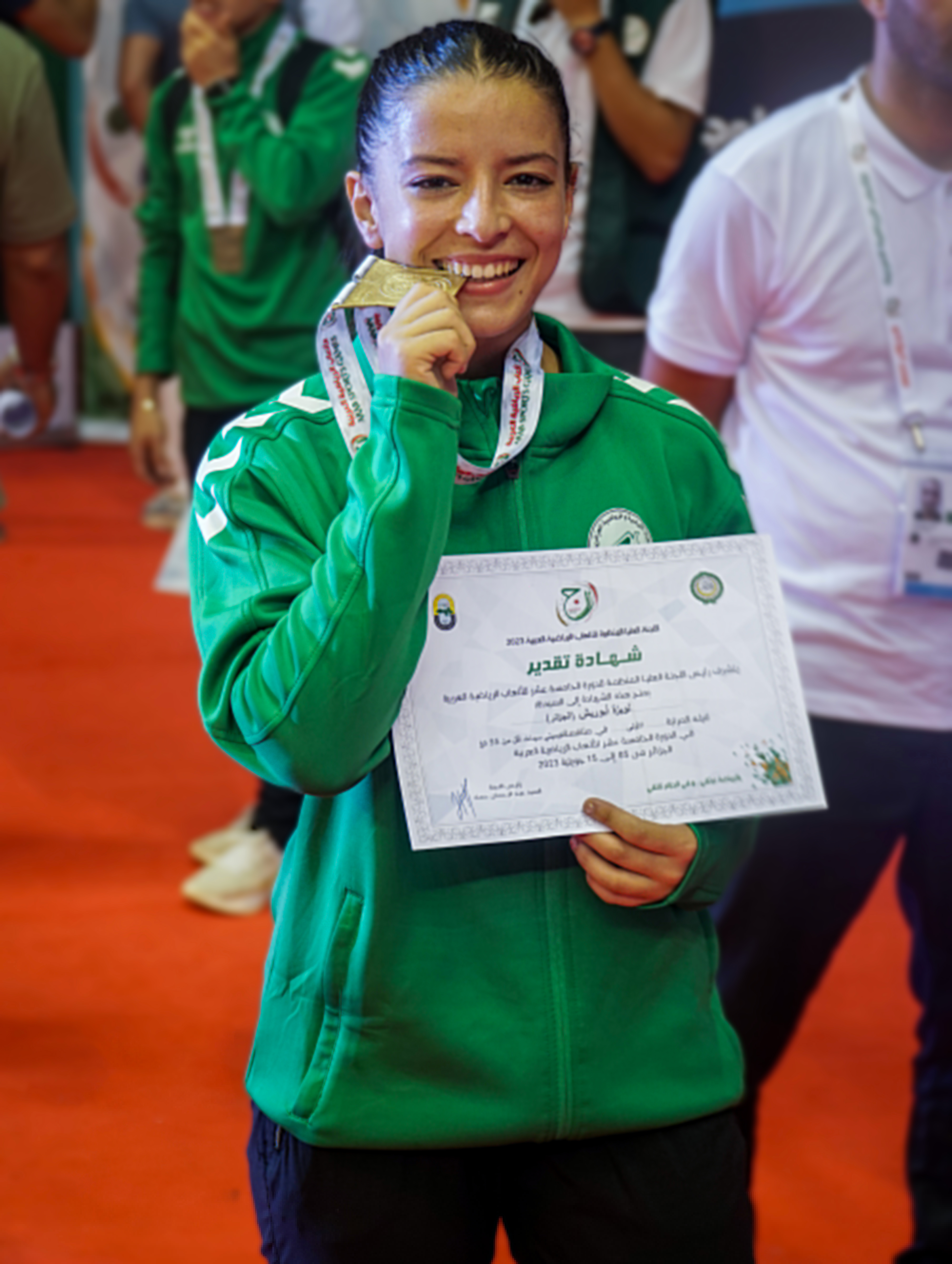
- Abouriche Louiza, winner of the 2023 Pan Arabe Games in karate -55kg.

Personal information
- Born: 4 April 2003 (age 23)

Sport
- Country: Algeria
- Sport: Karate
- Weight class: 55 kg
- Event: Kumite
Medal record
Women's karate
Representing Algeria
World Championships
Bronze medal – third place	2025 Cairo	Kumite 55 kg
African Games
Gold medal – first place	2023 Accra	Kumite 55 kg
African Championships
Gold medal – first place	2022 Durban	Team Kumite
Gold medal – first place	2023 Casablanca	Team Kumite
Gold medal – first place	2026 Algiers	Kumite 55 kg
Silver medal – second place	2022 Durban	Kumite 55 kg
Silver medal – second place	2023 Casablanca	Kumite 55 kg
Bronze medal – third place	2025 Abuja	Kumite 55 kg
U21 World Championship
Gold medal – first place	2022 Konya	Kumite 55 kg
Islamic Solidarity Games
Silver medal – second place	2021 Konya	Kumite 55 kg
Mediterranean Games
Gold medal – first place	2022 Oran	Kumite 55 kg

Louiza Abouriche (born 4 April 2003) is an Algerian karateka. She won the gold medal in the women's 55 kg event at the 2022 Mediterranean Games held in Oran, Algeria. She won the silver medal in the women's 55 kg event at the 2021 Islamic Solidarity Games held in Konya, Turkey.

== Achievements ==
Year	Competition	Venue	Rank	Event
2022	Mediterranean Games	Oran, Algeria	1st	Kumite 55 kg
2022	Islamic Solidarity Games	Konya, Turkey	2nd	Kumite 55 kg
2024	African Games	Accra, Ghana	1st	Kumite 55 kg
2025	World Championship	Cairo, Egypt	3rd	Kumite 55 kg
