= Chaimae El Hayti =

Moroccan karateka

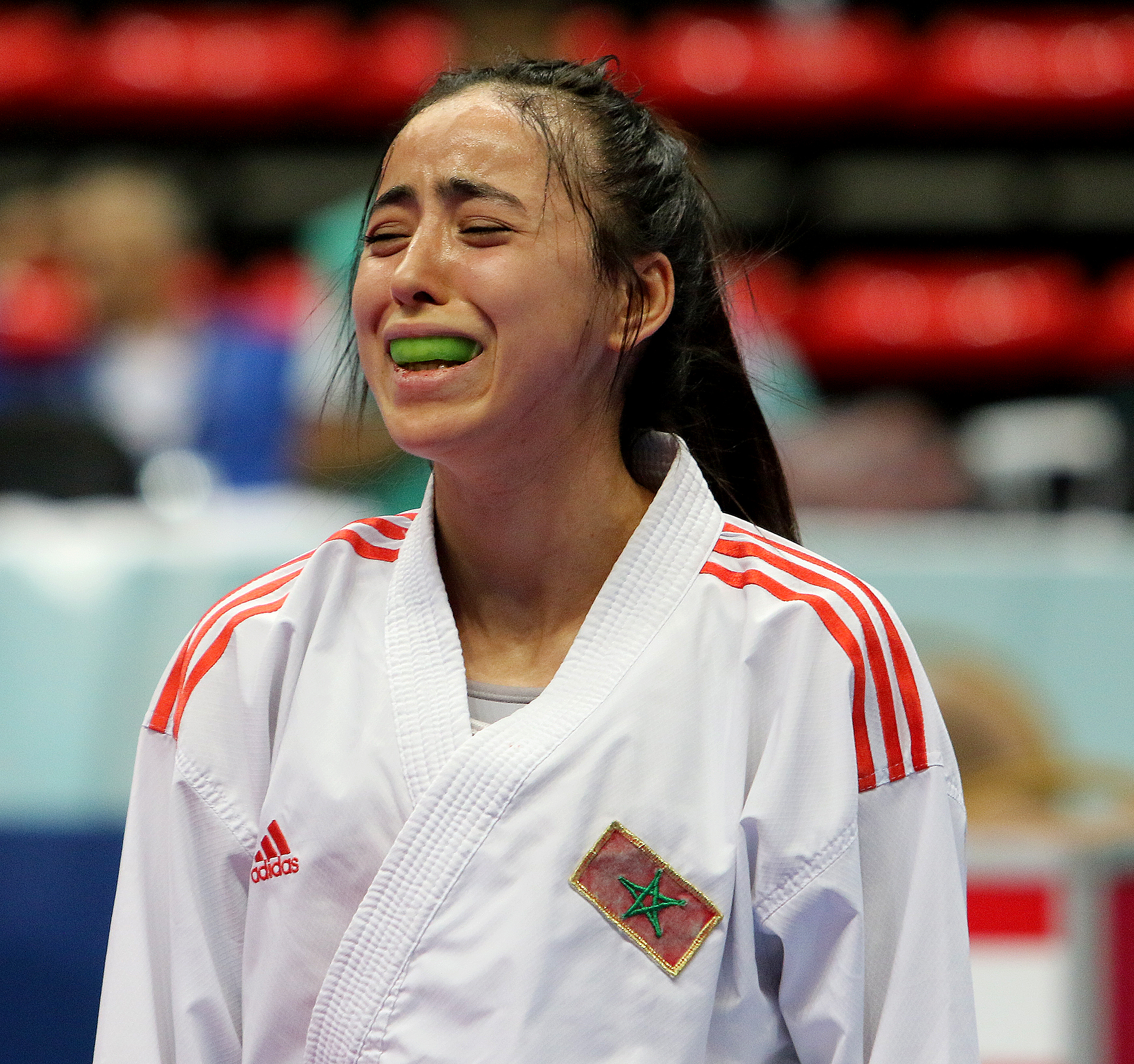
- 2021 Islamic Solidarity Games (2022)

Personal information
- Born: 8 May 2001 (age 25)

Sport
- Country: Morocco
- Sport: Karate
- Weight class: 50 kg; 55 kg
- Event: Kumite
Medal record
Women's karate
Representing Morocco
African Games
Bronze medal – third place	2023 Accra	Kumite 55 kg
Bronze medal – third place	2023 Accra	Team kumite
Islamic Solidarity Games
Gold medal – first place	2021 Konya	Kumite 50 kg
Silver medal – second place	2025 Riyadh	Kumite 55 kg
Mediterranean Games
Gold medal – first place	2026 Taranto	Kumite 55 kg
Bronze medal – third place	2022 Oran	Kumite 50 kg
Arab Games
Silver medal – second place	2023 Algiers	Kumite 50 kg

Chaimae El Hayti (Arabic: شيماء الحيطي, born 8 May 2001) is a Moroccan karateka. She won the gold medal in the women's 50 kg event at the 2021 Islamic Solidarity Games held in Konya, Turkey. She won one of the bronze medals in the women's 50 kg event at the 2022 Mediterranean Games held in Oran, Algeria.

She lost her bronze medal match in the women's 50 kg event at the 2021 World Karate Championships held in Dubai, United Arab Emirates.

In 2023, she won the silver medal in her event at the Arab Games held in Algiers, Algeria. She competed in the women's 50 kg event at the 2023 World Karate Championships held in Budapest, Hungary where she was eliminated in her first match.

== Achievements ==
Year	Competition	Venue	Rank	Event
2022	Mediterranean Games	Oran, Algeria	3rd	Kumite 50 kg
2022	Islamic Solidarity Games	Konya, Turkey	1st	Kumite 50 kg
2023	Arab Games	Algiers, Algeria	2nd	Kumite 50 kg
2024	African Games	Accra, Ghana	3rd	Kumite 55 kg
2024	African Games	Accra, Ghana	3rd	Team kumite
2025	Islamic Solidarity Games	Riyadh, Saudi Arabia	2nd	Kumite 55 kg
