= Ukraine at the 2022 World Games =

- IOC code: UKR
- NOC: National Olympic Committee of Ukraine

in Birmingham, United States 7 July 2022 – 17 July 2022
- Competitors: 104 in 20 sports
- Medals Ranked 3rd: Gold 16 Silver 12 Bronze 17 Total 45

World Games appearances (overview)
- 1993; 1997; 2001; 2005; 2009; 2013; 2017; 2022; 2025

Ukraine competed at the 2022 World Games in Birmingham, United States, from 7 July to 17 July 2022. Ukraine ranked third in the medal tally (behind Germany and the United States) as well as third by the number of medals (behind Italy and Germany). This was the best performance of Ukrainian athletes at the World Games.

Part of the ticket revenue was announced to be donated to Ukraine for rebuilding sports venues after the Russian invasion of Ukraine. A sum of $54,000 was donated to Ukraine.

== Medallists ==
Larysa Soloviova won at the age of 43 her fifth World Games medal. Before that, Soloviova won the competitions in middleweight at the 2005 Games (under her maiden surname Vitsiyevska), 2013 Games and 2017 Games as well as the competition in heavyweight at the 2009 Games. As of 2022, she is the most successful female powerlifter in the history of the World Games.

Bohdan Mochulskyi repeated his success of the 2017 Games and won gold in men's ju-jitsu. Both Igor Liubchenko and Oleh Pryimachov repeated their success of the 2017 Games when they won gold in men's muaythai. Svitlana Yaromka and Ivanna Berezovska won medals in both their weight category and open weight. Previously, Yaromka won a bronze at the 2013 Games and Berezovska won a silver at the 2017 Games.

Danylo Filchenko became the first Ukrainian athlete to win a medal in water skiing. Sofiia Hrechko became the first Ukrainian female finswimmer to win the World Games gold medal. Anzhelika Terliuga became the first Ukrainian female karateka to win the World Games gold medal. Bohdan Kolmakov won gold medal in parkour which debuted at the World Games. Alina Krysko became first Ukrainian female to win a medal in wushu at the World Games. Bogdana Golub became first Ukrainian female to win a medal in ju-jitsu at the World Games.

Anastasiia Antoniak won a medal at each of three consecutive World Games. Both Stanislav Horuna and Anita Serogina won their second World Games medal after they won their first medals in 2017. Volodymyr Rysyiev won his second World Games medals after he had been second in middleweight at the 2017 Games. Tetyana Melnyk won her second World Games medals after she had been second at the 2017 Games. Both Orfan Sananzade and Vitalii Dubina won their second World Games medal after they won their first medals in 2017 when kickboxing was an invitational sport.

=== Main programme ===
Medal	Name	Sport	Event	Date
Gold	Sofiia Hrechko	Finswimming	Women's 200 m surface	July 8
Gold	Anzhelika Terliuga	Karate	Women's kumite 55 kg	July 8
Gold	Anita Serogina	Karate	Women's kumite 61 kg	July 9
Gold	Volodymyr Rysyiev	Powerlifting	Men's heavyweight	July 9
Gold	Vazha Daiauri	Sumo	Men's middleweight	July 9
Gold	Svitlana Yaromka	Sumo	Women's heavyweight	July 9
Gold	Oleksii Bychkov	Powerlifting	Men's super heavyweight	July 10
Gold	Ivanna Berezovska	Sumo	Women's openweight	July 10
Gold	Bohdan Kolmakov	Parkour	Men's speedrun	July 11
Gold	Viktoriia Kozlovska; Taisiia Marchenko	Acrobatic gymnastics	Women's pairs	July 15
Gold	Bohdan Pohranychnyi; Danylo Stetsiuk	Acrobatic gymnastics	Men's pairs	July 16
Gold	Bohdan Mochulskyi	Ju-jitsu	Men's fighting 62 kg	July 16
Gold	Danylo Filchenko	Water skiing	Men's jump	July 16
Gold	Igor Liubchenko	Muaythai	Men's 63.5 kg	July 17
Gold	Oleh Pryimachov	Muaythai	Men's 91 kg	July 17
Gold	Anastasiia Kulinich	Muaythai	Women's 48 kg	July 17
Silver	Mykola Barannik	Powerlifting	Men's middleweight	July 9
Silver	Sofiia Hrechko	Finswimming	Women's 400 m surface	July 9
Silver	Stanislav Horuna	Karate	Men's kumite 75 kg	July 9
Silver	Demid Karachenko	Sumo	Men's lightweight	July 9
Silver	Karyna Kolesnik	Sumo	Women's middleweight	July 9
Silver	Ivanna Berezovska	Sumo	Women's heavyweight	July 9
Silver	Orfan Sananzade	Kickboxing	Men's 63,5 kg	July 14
Silver	Vitalii Dubina	Kickboxing	Men's 75 kg	July 14
Silver	Danylo Filchenko	Water skiing	Men's tricks	July 15
Silver	Bogdana Golub	Ju-jitsu	Women's ne-waza open	July 16
Silver	Oleksandr Yefimenko	Water skiing	Men's 71 kg	July 17
Bronze	Anastasiia Derevianko	Powerlifting	Women's lightweight	July 8
Bronze	Larysa Soloviova	Powerlifting	Women's middleweight	July 8
Bronze	Anastasiia Antoniak	Finswimming	Women's 400 m surface	July 9
Bronze	Danylo Kovalov	Powerlifting	Men's heavyweight	July 9
Bronze	Sviatoslav Semykras	Sumo	Men's lightweight	July 9
Bronze	Tetyana Melnyk	Powerlifting	Women's super heavyweight	July 10
Bronze	Oleksandr Veresiuk	Sumo	Men's openweight	July 10
Bronze	Svitlana Yaromka	Sumo	Women's openweight	July 10
Bronze	Viktoriia Onopriienko	Rhythmic gymnastics	Ribbon	July 13
Bronze	Roman Shcherbatiuk	Kickboxing	Men's +91 kg	July 14
Bronze	Daryna Ivanova	Kickboxing	Women's 52 kg	July 14
Bronze	Alina Martyniuk	Kickboxing	Women's 60 kg	July 14
Bronze	Yaroslav Tkach	Sport climbing	Men's speed	July 14
Bronze	Viktoriia Kunitska; Oleksandra Malchuk; Daryna Pomianovska	Acrobatic gymnastics	Women's groups	July 16
Bronze	Stanislav Kukurudz; Yurii Push; Yuriy Savka; Taras Yarush	Acrobatic gymnastics	Men's groups	July 17
Bronze	Vladyslav Mykytas	Water skiing	Men's 57 kg	July 17

=== Invitational sports ===
Medal	Name	Sport	Event	Date
Silver	Alina Krysko	Wushu	Women's daoshu & gunshu combined	July 13
Bronze	Roman Reva	Wushu	Men's changquan	July 12

== Competitors ==
Sports	Men	Women	Total
Acrobatic gymnastics	7	6	13
Aerobic gymnastics	3	7	10
Air sports	1	0	1
Canoe marathon	1	1	2
Dancesport	1	1	2
Finswimming	5	6	11
Ju-jitsu	1	2	3
Karate	2	4	6
Kickboxing	3	2	5
Muay Thai	4	1	5
Orienteering	2	2	4
Parkour	1	1	2
Powerlifting	6	5	11
Rhythmic gymnastics	—N/a	2	2
Sport climbing	2	2	4
Squash	2	2	4
Sumo	5	6	11
Trampoline gymnastics	1	1	2
Water skiing	1	2	3
Wushu	1	2	3
Total	49	55	104

== Acrobatic gymnastics ==
Ukraine competed in acrobatic gymnastics and had the largest team at the Games. Ukraine won four of five medals and became the most successful in terms of number of medals.

Athletes	Event	Qualification						Final	
Athletes	Event	Balance exercise		Dynamic exercise		Total		Final exercise	
Athletes	Event	Result	Rank	Result	Rank	Result	Rank	Result	Rank
Bohdan Pohranychnyi; Danylo Stetsiuk	Men's pairs	28.330	1	28.510	2	56.840	1 Q	28.940	1st place, gold medalist(s)
Viktoriia Kozlovska; Taisiia Marchenko	Women's pairs	28.910	1	28.270	1	57.180	1 Q	29.290	1st place, gold medalist(s)
Anastasiia Semenovych; Bohdan Ivanyk	Mixed pairs	27.880	4	27.050	5	54.930	4 Q	22.250	4
Stanislav Kukurudz; Yurii Push; Yuriy Savka; Taras Yarush	Men's groups	27.980	4	27.390	4	55.370	4 Q	28.410	3rd place, bronze medalist(s)
Viktoriia Kunitska; Oleksandra Malchuk; Daryna Pomianovska	Women's groups	28.170	3	27.810	4	55.980	4 Q	28.600	3rd place, bronze medalist(s)

== Aerobic gymnastics ==
Ukraine was the fifth largest team in the sport (behind Italy, Romania, Hungary and Azerbaijan) and did not compete in the dance competition. Maksym Buben was a reserve athlete.

Athletes	Event	Qualification		Final	
Athletes	Event	Result	Rank	Result	Rank
Anastasiia Isaienko; Dmytro Lobusov	Pairs	18.350	6	Did not advance	
Stanislav Halaida; Anastasiia Kurashvili; Anastasiia Lytvyn	Trio	18.444	6	Did not advance	
Kateryna Cherkez; Anastasiia Isaienko; Oleksandra Mokhort; Ilona Shelest; Daria Subotina	Group	18.355	5	Did not advance	

== Air sports ==
Ukraine competed in air sports.

Athletes	Event	Round 1				Round 2				Round 3				Final result	
Athletes	Event	Accuracy	Distance	Freestyle	Speed	Accuracy	Distance	Freestyle	Speed	Accuracy	Distance	Freestyle	Speed	Sum	Final rank
Ivan Semenyaka	Canopy piloting	13	18	21	23	21	9	32	18	27	22	31	27	262	27

== Canoe marathon ==
Ukraine was represented in all events.

Men

Athlete	Event	Heats		Final	
Athlete	Event	Result	Rank	Result	Rank
Valerii Riabov	Short distance	14:48.65	7 QA	15:46.15	15
Valerii Riabov	Long distance	—N/a		1:29:27.02	13

Women

Athlete	Event	Heats		Final	
Athlete	Event	Result	Rank	Result	Rank
Anastasiia Mostovenko	Short distance	17:48.53	8	Did not advance	
Anastasiia Mostovenko	Long distance	—N/a		1:43:21.52	16

== Dancesport ==
Ukraine competed in dancesport.

Standard

Athletes	Event	First round							Semi-finals							Finals						
Athletes	Event	Waltz	Tango	Viennese Waltz	Slow Foxtrot	Quickstep	Total points	Rank	Waltz	Tango	Viennese Waltz	Slow Foxtrot	Quickstep	Total points	Rank	Waltz	Tango	Viennese Waltz	Slow Foxtrot	Quickstep	Total points	Rank
Valeriia Dorofei; Dmytro Yevtyeryev	Standard	32.50	32.67	32.90	34.17	33.25	165.48	15	Did not qualify													

== Finswimming ==
Ukraine competed in almost all events in finswimming (except for women's 50 m apnoe).

Men

Athlete	Event	Final	
Athlete	Event	Time	Rank
Serhii Smishchenko	50 m apnoea	14.99	8
Serhii Smishchenko	100 m surface	36.75	5
Oleksii Zakharov	200 m surface	1:21.96	6
Oleksii Zakharov	400 m surface	2:58.31	5
Viktor Riepin	50 m bi-fins	19.58	6
Viktor Riepin	100 m bi-fins	43.12	6
Dmytro Haponenko; Oleksandr Odynokov; Serhii Smishchenko; Oleksii Zakharov	4x50 m surface relay	1:03.36	5
Dmytro Haponenko; Oleksandr Odynokov; Serhii Smishchenko; Oleksii Zakharov	4x100 m surface relay	2:24.61	6

Women

Athlete	Event	Final	
Athlete	Event	Time	Rank
Viktoriia Uvarova	100 m surface	40.74	6
Sofiia Hrechko	200 m surface	1:29.57	1st place, gold medalist(s)
Sofiia Hrechko	400 m surface	3:16.22	2nd place, silver medalist(s)
Anastasiia Antoniak	400 m surface	3:18.84	3rd place, bronze medalist(s)
Anastasiia Makarenko	200 m surface	1:34.78	7
Iryna Pikiner	50 m bi-fins	22.11	6
Iryna Pikiner	100 m bi-fins	48.23	5
Yevheniia Tymoshenko	50 m bi-fins	22.50	7
Yevheniia Tymoshenko	100 m bi-fins	48.85	7
Anastasiia Antoniak; Sofiia Hrechko; Anastasiia Makarenko; Viktoriia Uvarova	4x50 m surface relay	1:11.41	4
Anastasiia Antoniak; Sofiia Hrechko; Anastasiia Makarenko; Viktoriia Uvarova	4x100 m surface relay	2:37.62	4

== Ju-jitsu ==
Ukraine competed in ju-jitsu.

Men

Athlete	Category	Group stage			Semi-finals	Final/Bronze medal bout	
Athlete	Category	Opposition Result	Opposition Result	Rank	Opposition Result	Opposition Result	Rank
Bohdan Mochulskyi	Fighting 62 kg	Calzoni (ITA); W 14–5	Mathieu (FRA); W 13–4	1 Q	Van der Veer (NED); W 14–14	Viviescas (COL); W 19–7	1st place, gold medalist(s)

Women

Athlete	Category	Group stage			Quarterfinals	Semi-finals	Final/Bronze medal bout	
Athlete	Category	Opposition Result	Opposition Result	Rank	Opposition Result	Opposition Result	Opposition Result	Rank
Oleksandra Rusetska	Ne-waza 48 kg	Abdoh Abdulla (UAE); W 14–0	Phattaraboonsorn (THA); L 0–14	2 Q	—N/a	Hoang (CAN); L 0–14	Brodski (GER); L 0–12	4
Bogdana Golub	Ne-waza 63 kg	Povsnar (SLO); L 0–0	Weidgenand (USA); W 14–0	2 Q	—N/a	Nisimian (ISR); L 0–0	Alkalbani (UAE); L 2–2	4
Bogdana Golub	Ne-waza open	—N/a			Cordeiro de Souza (HUN); W 2–0	Alkalbani (UAE); W 2–0	Rosenfeld (ISR); L 0–2	2nd place, silver medalist(s)
Oleksandra Rusetska	Ne-waza open	—N/a			Duvanova (KAZ); L 0–6	Did not advance		

== Karate ==
Ukraine managed to qualify 2 male and 4 female karateka, all in kumite competitions. Ukraine's team was the third largest team (after the host United States and Egypt). Kateryna Kryva and Anita Serogina qualified as medallist of the 2021 World Championships. Stanislav Horuna and Anzhelika Terliuga qualified through the WKF rating. Halyna Melnyk qualified as a continental representative. Ryzvan Talibov qualified as replacement athlete. Ukraine finished third in the medal tally in karate behind Spain and Egypt.

Horuna competed at his second Games and won his second medal. Serogina competed at her third Games and won her second consecutive medal, while Kryva competed for the second time.

Men

Athlete	Category	Group stage				Semi-finals	Final/Bronze medal bout	
Athlete	Category	Opposition Result	Opposition Result	Opposition Result	Rank	Opposition Result	Opposition Result	Rank
Stanislav Horuna	75 kg	Abdelaziz (EGY); W 6–5	Mahauden (BEL); W 2–0	Azhikanov (KAZ); W 8–3	1 Q	Otabolaev (UZB); W 8–0	Abdelaziz (EGY); L 3–6	2nd place, silver medalist(s)
Ryzvan Talibov	+84 kg	Gurbanli (AZE); W 4–1	Seck (ESP); L 1–2	No other competitor	2 Q	Kvesić (CRO); L 2–7	Tarek (EGY); L 0–2	4

Women

Athlete	Category	Group stage				Semi-finals	Final/Bronze medal bout	
Athlete	Category	Opposition Result	Opposition Result	Opposition Result	Rank	Opposition Result	Opposition Result	Rank
Kateryna Kryva	50 kg	Miyahara (JPN); L 1–2	Alexander (USA); L 1–3	Gu (TPE); L 0–1	4	Did not advance		7
Anzhelika Terliuga	55 kg	Kumizaki (BRA); D 3–3	Goranova (BUL); W 3–0	Warling (LUX); W 4–1	1 Q	Allen (USA); W 8–1	Youssef (EGY); W 1–0	1st place, gold medalist(s)
Anita Serogina	61 kg	Klinepeter (USA); W 7–2	Ali (EGY); L 1–2	Snel (NED); W 3–1	2 Q	Suchánková (SVK); W 3–2	Grande (PER); W 3–2	1st place, gold medalist(s)
Halyna Melnyk	68 kg	Agier (FRA); D 3–3	Zaretska (AZE); L 1–5	Quirici (SUI); L 1–5	4	Did not advance		7

== Kickboxing ==
Ukraine's kickboxing team was the biggest at the Games. Ukraine was not represented only in women's 70 kg category.

Men

Athlete	Category	Quarterfinals	Semi-finals	Final/Bronze medal bout	
Athlete	Category	Opposition Result	Opposition Result	Opposition Result	Rank
Orfan Sananzade	63,5 kg	Mirchev (BUL); W 3–0	Tlemissov (KAZ); W 3–0	Martínez (MEX); L 0–3	2nd place, silver medalist(s)
Vitalii Dubina	75 kg	Doherty (CAN); W 3–0	Dvořáček (CZE); W 3–0	Moshe (ISR); L 0–3	2nd place, silver medalist(s)
Roman Shcherbatiuk	+91 kg	Higuera (VEN); W 3–0	Rajabzadeh (AZE); L 0–3	Suksi (FIN); W RSC	3rd place, bronze medalist(s)

Women

Athlete	Category	Quarterfinals	Semi-finals	Final/Bronze medal bout	
Athlete	Category	Opposition Result	Opposition Result	Opposition Result	Rank
Daryna Ivanova	52 kg	Goode (CAN); W 3–0	Nieroda-Zdziebko (POL); L 1–2	Strnadová (CZE); W 3–0	3rd place, bronze medalist(s)
Alina Martyniuk	60 kg	Cebuc (ROU); W 2–1	Hemetsberger (AUT); L 1–2	Connart (BEL); W 2–1	3rd place, bronze medalist(s)

== Muaythai ==
Ukraine and Thailand qualified the largest number of boxers after the host United States that were allowed to enter a competitor in each category. Ukraine became the most successful nation in the sport at the Games.

Men

Athlete	Category	Quarterfinals	Semi-finals	Final/Bronze medal bout	
Athlete	Category	Opposition Result	Opposition Result	Opposition Result	Rank
Vladyslav Mykytas	57 kg	Delarmino (PHI); W 30–28	Nguyễn (VIE); L 28–29	Zakzook (JOR); W WO	3rd place, bronze medalist(s)
Igor Liubchenko	63.5 kg	Galiyev (KAZ); W 30–26	Mueller (USA); W 30–27	Tharakhajad (THA); W DRAW	1st place, gold medalist(s)
Oleksandr Yefimenko	71 kg	Noites (POR); W 29–28	Weiland (USA); W 30–27	Nitutorn (THA); L 27–30	2nd place, silver medalist(s)
Oleh Pryimachov	91 kg	Kakhramonov (UZB); W KO–B	Jeanne (FRA); W RSC–In	Baker (USA); W 30–27	1st place, gold medalist(s)

Women

Athlete	Category	Quarterfinals	Semi-finals	Final/Bronze medal bout	
Athlete	Category	Opposition Result	Opposition Result	Opposition Result	Rank
Anastasiia Kulinich	48 kg	Sherzad (AFG); W RSC	Garcia Borbon (USA); W 29–28	Gowing (CAN); W 30–27	1st place, gold medalist(s)

== Orienteering ==
Ukraine competed in orienteering.

Men

Athlete	Event	Time	Rank
Ruslan Glibov	Sprint	15:41	21
Ruslan Glibov	Middle distance	36:02	4
Oleksandr Kratov	Sprint	18:52	36
Oleksandr Kratov	Middle distance	Did not finish	

Women

Athlete	Event	Time	Rank
Olena Babych	Sprint	15:54	8
Olena Babych	Middle distance	51:11	22
Kateryna Dzema	Sprint	16:48	15
Kateryna Dzema	Middle distance	47:37	16

Mixed

Athlete	Event	Time	Rank
Olena Babych; Kateryna Dzema; Ruslan Glibov; Oleksandr Kratov	Mixed sprint relay	Disqualified	

== Parkour ==
This was parkour's debut at the World Games. Only Ukraine and Japan were scheduled to compete in all men's and women's competitions but Bohdan Kolmakov did not start in the freestyle event. Czech Republic and Sweden were also represented by a male and a female athlete but not in all events.

Men

Athlete	Event	Qualification		Final	
Athlete	Event	Result	Rank	Result	Rank
Bohdan Kolmakov	Speedrun	21.59	1 Q	20.75	1st place, gold medalist(s)
Bohdan Kolmakov	Freestyle	DNS			

Women

Athlete	Event	Qualification		Final	
Athlete	Event	Result	Rank	Result	Rank
Anna Griukach	Speedrun	34.81	3 Q	35.32	4
Anna Griukach	Freestyle	14.0	6 Q	15.5	6

== Powerlifting ==
Ukraine competed in powerlifting and was the biggest team in the sport, though the country was not represented in all categories. Ukraine became the most successful nation in the sport by winning 7 medals, including 2 gold medals.

Men

Athlete	Event	Exercises			Total weight	Total points	Rank
Athlete	Event	Squat	Bench press	Deadlift	Total weight	Total points	Rank
Mykola Barannik	Men's middleweight	360.0	260.0	302.5	922.5	106.90	2nd place, silver medalist(s)
Vladyslav Chornyi	Men's middleweight	330.0	220.0	290.0	840.0	99.52	7
Volodymyr Rysyiev	Men's heavyweight	387.5	270.0	345.0	1002.5	108.87	1st place, gold medalist(s)
Danylo Kovalov	Men's heavyweight	402.5	295.0	315.0	1012.5	103.83	3rd place, bronze medalist(s)
Oleksiy Bychkov	Men's super heavyweight	400.0	340.0	375.0	1115.0	107.92	1st place, gold medalist(s)
Andrii Shevchenko	Men's super heavyweight	430.0	332.5	337.5	1100.0	100.94	6

Women

Athlete	Event	Exercises			Total weight	Total points	Rank
Athlete	Event	Squat	Bench press	Deadlift	Total weight	Total points	Rank
Anastasiia Derevianko	Women's lightweight	187.5	115.0	180.0	482.5	100.72	3rd place, bronze medalist(s)
Tetiana Bila	Women's lightweight	187.5	DNF				
Larysa Soloviova	Women's middleweight	215.0	160.0	217.5	592.5	107.02	3rd place, bronze medalist(s)
Tetyana Melnyk	Women's super heavyweight	255.0	185.0	210.0	650.0	105.63	3rd place, bronze medalist(s)
Daria Rusanenko	Women's super heavyweight	265.0	140.0	195.0	600.0	98.42	6

== Rhythmic gymnastics ==
Ukraine was represented in all events by the maximum number of athletes.

Athlete	Event	Qualification		Final	
Athlete	Event	Points	Rank	Points	Rank
Viktoriia Onopriienko	Ball	27.950	18	Did not advance	
Viktoriia Onopriienko	Clubs	29.050	14	Did not advance	
Viktoriia Onopriienko	Hoop	31.950	7 Q	27.700	8
Viktoriia Onopriienko	Ribbon	31.150	4 Q	31.750	3rd place, bronze medalist(s)
Polina Karika	Ball	26.550	21	Did not advance	
Polina Karika	Clubs	29.500	12	Did not advance	
Polina Karika	Hoop	29.050	15	Did not advance	
Polina Karika	Ribbon	29.500	8 Q	27.650	8

== Sport climbing ==
Ukraine won one bronze medal in sport climbing.

Speed

Athlete	Event	Qualification		Quarterfinals	Semi-finals	Final/Bronze medal bout	
Athlete	Event	Result	Rank	Opposition Result	Opposition Result	Opposition Result	Rank
Yaroslav Tkach	Men's	5.568	4 Q	Boldyrev (UKR); W 5.76–5.82	Katibin (INA); L 6.27–5.45	Khaibullin (KAZ); W 5.56–5.60	3rd place, bronze medalist(s)
Danyil Boldyrev	Men's	5.660	5 Q	Tkach (UKR); L 5.82–5.76	Did not advance		
Yelyzaveta Lavrykova	Women's	8.920	8 Q	Kałucka (POL); L 12.70–8.79	Did not advance		

Lead

Athlete	Event	Qualification		Final	
Athlete	Event	HR	Rank	HR	Rank
Ievgeniia Kazbekova	Women's	32+	=3 Q	32+	=5

== Squash ==
Ukraine competed in squash.

Athlete	Event	Round of 32	Round of 16/ Plate tournament	Quarterfinals/ Plate tournament	Semi-finals/ Plate tournament	Final/Bronze medal game/ Plate tournament	
Athlete	Event	Opposition Result	Opposition Result	Opposition Result	Opposition Result	Opposition Result	Rank
Valeriy Fedoruk	Men's singles	Steinmann (SUI); L 0–2	Conroy (IRL); L 0–2	Did not advance			
Dmytro Scherbakov	Men's singles	Masotti (FRA); L 0–2	Farkas (HUN); L 0–2	Did not advance			
Nadiya Usenko	Women's singles	Watanabe (JPN); L 0–2	Tovar (COL); L 0–2	Did not advance			
Anastasiia Kostiukova	Women's singles	Cheng (HKG); L 0–2	Chukwu (HUN); W 2–0	Serme (CZE); L 0–2	Did not advance		

== Sumo ==
Ukraine's sumo team was the third largest sumo team at the Games (after the host United States and Japan). Both Ukraine and Japan won 9 medals and became the most successful teams in terms of medals won, but Japan won 4 gold medals, while Ukraine won 3 gold medals. Ivanna Berezovska and Svitlana Yaromka managed to win medals both in their category and in open weight.

=== Weight categories ===
Men

Athlete	Event	1/16 finals	Quarter-finals	1/16 Repechages	Repechages quarterfinals	Semi-finals	Repechages semi-finals	Final / BM	
Athlete	Event	1/16 finals	Quarter-finals	1/16 Repechages	Repechages quarterfinals	Semi-finals	Repechages semi-finals	Opposition	Rank
Demid Karachenko	Men's lightweight	Kizzart (USA); W	Svensson (NOR); W	N/A		Dochev (BUL); W	N/A	Elsefy (EGY); L	2nd place, silver medalist(s)
Sviatoslav Semykras	Men's lightweight	Swora (POL); W	Nakaya (BRA); W	N/A		Elsefy (EGY); L	Cova (VEN); W	Dochev (BUL); W	3rd place, bronze medalist(s)
Anatolii Khliusin	Men's lightweight	Sabo (USA); W	Elsefy (EGY); L	Bayarsaikhan (MGL); W	Swora (POL); W	N/A	Dochev (BUL); L	N/A	5
Vazha Daiauri	Men's middleweight	Bye	Rozum (POL); W	N/A		Fukano (JPN); W	N/A	Fujisawa (JPN); W	1st place, gold medalist(s)
Oleksandr Veresiuk	Men's middleweight	Piersiak (POL); L	N/A						

Women

Athlete	Event	1/16 finals	Quarter-finals	1/16 Repechages	Repechages quarterfinals	Semi-finals	Repechages semi-finals	Final / BM	
Athlete	Event	1/16 finals	Quarter-finals	1/16 Repechages	Repechages quarterfinals	Semi-finals	Repechages semi-finals	Opposition	Rank
Alina Duzhenko	Women's lightweight	Jefferson-Vanduzen (USA); W	Andrzejak (POL); W	N/A		Yamanaka (JPN); L	Montgomery Watanabe (BRA); W	Macios (POL); L	4
Karyna Kolesnik	Women's middleweight	Crook (USA); W	Matsumoto (JPN); W	N/A		Ota (JPN); W	N/A	Ishii (JPN); L	2nd place, silver medalist(s)
Maryna Maksymenko	Women's middleweight	Skiba (POL); W	Oddlien (NOR); W	N/A		Ishii (JPN); L	Matsumoto (JPN); L	N/A	5
Svitlana Yaromka	Women's heavyweight	Hisano (JPN); W	Ting (TPE); W	N/A		Tsaruk (UKR); W	N/A	Berezovska (UKR); W	1st place, gold medalist(s)
Ivanna Berezovska	Women's heavyweight	Pelegrini (BRA); W	Cedeno (VEN); W	N/A		Armstrong (USA); W	N/A	Yaromka (UKR); L	2nd place, silver medalist(s)
Viktoriia Tsaruk	Women's heavyweight	Bum-Erdene (MGL); W	Galindo (USA); W	N/A		Yaromka (UKR); L	Cedeno (VEN); L	N/A	5

=== Openweight ===
Main rounds

Athlete	Event	1/64 finals	1/32 finals	1/16 finals	Quarter-finals	Semi-finals	Final	
Athlete	Event	1/64 finals	1/32 finals	1/16 finals	Quarter-finals	Semi-finals	Opposition	Rank
Oleksandr Veresiuk	Men's openweight	Roden (USA); W	Riihioja (FIN); W	Rozum (POL); W	Fujisawa (JPN); W	Nakamura (JPN); L	DNQ	
Vazha Daiauri	Men's openweight	Kizzart (USA); W	Tsogt-Erdene (MGL); L	DNQ				
Sviatoslav Semykras	Men's openweight	Perez (VEN); W	Sims (USA); W	Nakamura (JPN); L	DNQ			
Anatolii Khliusin	Men's openweight	Misbah (EGY); W	Tetsushi Nakaya (BRA); W	Kerstner (HUN); W	Tsogt-Erdene (MGL); L	DNQ		
Demid Karachenko	Men's openweight	Junior (BRA); L	DNQ					
Ivanna Berezovska	Women's openweight	Purevjargal (MGL); W	Amnuaypol (THA); W	Pelegrini (BRA); W	Hisano (JPN); W	Kolesnik (UKR); W	Kon (JPN); W	1st place, gold medalist(s)
Svitlana Yaromka	Women's openweight	Bye	Skrajnowska (POL); W	Dagvadorj (MGL); W	Okutomi (JPN); W	Kon (JPN); L	N/A	
Karyna Kolesnik	Women's openweight	Crook (USA); W	Montgomery Watanabe Higuchi (BRA); W	Bum-Erdene (MGL); W	Matsumoto (JPN); W	Berezovska (UKR); L	N/A	
Viktoriia Tsaruk	Women's openweight	Sun (TPE); W	Ball (USA); L	N/A				
Alina Duzhenko	Women's openweight	Jefferson-Vandusen (USA); L	N/A					
Maryna Maksymenko	Women's openweight	Schmidtsdorf (GER); L	N/A					

Repechages

Athlete	Event	1/64 finals repechage	1/32 finals repechage	1/16 finals repechage	Quarter-finals repechage	Semi-finals repechage	Bronze medal final	
Athlete	Event	1/64 finals repechage	1/32 finals repechage	1/16 finals repechage	Quarter-finals repechage	Semi-finals repechage	Opposition	Rank
Oleksandr Veresiuk	Men's openweight	N/A				Daiauri (UKR); W	Tsogt-Erdene (MGL); W	3rd place, bronze medalist(s)
Vazha Daiauri	Men's openweight	N/A	Luto (POL); W	Khliusin (UKR); W	Junior (BRA); W	Veresiuk (UKR); L	N/A	5
Sviatoslav Semykras	Men's openweight	N/A	Delatorre (USA); W	Swora (POL); W	Roden (USA); W	Tsogt-Erdene (MGL); L	N/A	5
Anatolii Khliusin	Men's openweight	N/A		Daiauri (UKR); L	DNQ			
Svitlana Yaromka	Women's openweight	N/A				Pelegrini (BRA); W	Kolesnik (UKR); W	3rd place, bronze medalist(s)
Karyna Kolesnik	Women's openweight	N/A				Yamanaka (JPN); W	Yaromka (UKR); L	4

== Trampoline gymnastics ==
Ukraine competed in trampoline gymnastics.

Men

Athletes	Event	Qualification		Final			
Athletes	Event	Score	Rank	Final 1	Rank	Final 2	Rank
Vitalii Voitiv	Tumbling	45.800	9	Did not advance			

Women

Athletes	Event	Qualification		Final			
Athletes	Event	Score	Rank	Final 1	Rank	Final 2	Rank
Daryna Koziarska	Tumbling	45.600	5 Q	22.000	6	Did not advance	

== Water skiing ==
Ukraine competed in water skiing. Ukraine did not compete in slalom competitions as well as women's tricks and men's wakeboard. Danylo Filchenko was the only athlete in this sport to win two medals. Ukraine was the most successful European team in this sport at the Games.

Tricks

Athletes	Event	Preliminary round				Final			
Athletes	Event	Pass 1	Pass 2	Total	Rank	Pass 1	Pass 2	Total	Rank
Danylo Filchenko	Men's tricks	6220	4920	11140	1 Q	6220	4920	11140	2nd place, silver medalist(s)

Wakeboard

Athletes	Event	Heats		Last chance qualifiers		Semi-final		Final	
Athletes	Event	Result	Rank	Result	Rank	Result	Rank	Result	Rank
Varvara Dolinina	Women's wakeboard	41.22	3	62.11	2	—N/a		Did not advance	

Jump

Athletes	Event	Preliminary round		Final	
Athletes	Event	Result	Rank	Result	Rank
Danylo Filchenko	Men's jump	61.4	2 Q	64.9	1st place, gold medalist(s)
Stanislava Prosvietova	Women's jump	37.0	5 Q	43.0	4

== Wushu ==
Ukraine competed in wushu.

Changquan

Athlete	Event	Score	Rank
Roman Reva	Men's	9.253	3rd place, bronze medalist(s)

Daoshu / Gunshu

Athlete	Event	Gunshu		Daoshu		Total	
Athlete	Event	Score	Rank	Score	Rank	Score	Rank
Alina Krysko	Women's	9.373	1	9.293	3	18.666	2nd place, silver medalist(s)

Jianshu / Qiangshu

Athlete	Event	Jianshu		Qiangshu		Total	
Athlete	Event	Score	Rank	Score	Rank	Score	Rank
Yana Poltoratska	Women's	9.060	4	9.120	3	18.180	4
