= Bulgaria at the 2022 World Games =

- IOC code: BUL
- NOC: Bulgarian Olympic Committee

in Birmingham, United States 7 July 2022 – 17 July 2022
- Competitors: 10 (5 men and 5 women) in 6 sports
- Medals Ranked 40th: Gold 1 Silver 1 Bronze 1 Total 3

World Games appearances
- 1981; 1985; 1989; 1993; 1997; 2001; 2005; 2009; 2013; 2017; 2022; 2025

Bulgaria competed at the 2022 World Games held in Birmingham, United States from 7 to 17 July 2022. Athletes representing Bulgaria won one gold medal, one silver medal and one bronze medal. The country finished in 40th place in the medal table.

== Medalists ==
Medal	Name	Sport	Event	Date
Gold	Boryana Kaleyn	Rhythmic gymnastics	Hoop	12 July
Silver	Boryana Kaleyn	Rhythmic gymnastics	Ribbon	13 July
Bronze	Antonio Papazov; Ana-Maria Stoilova	Aerobic gymnastics	Pairs	12 July

== Competitors ==
The following is the list of number of competitors in the Games.

Sport	Men	Women	Total
Aerobic gymnastics	2	2	4
Karate	0	1	1
Kickboxing	1	0	1
Parkour	1	0	1
Rhythmic gymnastics	—N/a	2	2
Sumo	1	0	1
Total	5	5	10

== Aerobic gymnastics ==
Bulgaria competed in aerobic gymnastics and take bronze in pairs.

Athlete	Event	Qualification		Final	
Athlete	Event	Result	Rank	Result	Rank
Antonio Papazov; Anna Maria Stoilova	Pairs	20.150	3rd Q	20.250	3rd place, bronze medalist(s)
Antonio Papazov; Darina Pashova; Tihomir Barotev	Trio	19.344	5th	did not advance	5

== Karate ==
Bulgaria competed in karate.

Women

Athlete	Event	Group stage				Semifinal	Final / BM	
Athlete	Event	Opposition Result	Opposition Result	Opposition Result	Rank	Opposition Result	Opposition Result	Rank
Ivet Goranova	Women's 55 kg	Terliuga (UKR); L 0–3	Warling (LUX); L 1–5	Kumizaki (BRA); W 1–0	3	Did not advance		5

== Kickboxing ==
Bulgaria competed in kickboxing.

Athlete	Category	Quarterfinals	Semifinals	Final/Bronze medal bout	
Athlete	Category	Opposition Result	Opposition Result	Opposition Result	Rank
Ognyan Mirchev	Men's 63.5 kg	Sananzade (UKR); W 0–3	did not advance		

== Parkour ==
Bulgaria competed in parkour gymnastics.

== Rhythmic gymnastics ==
Bulgaria competed in rhythmic gymnastics and takes gold and silver.

== Sumo ==
Bulgaria competed in sumo.

=== Weight categories ===
Men

Athlete	Event	1/16 finals	Quarterfinals	1/16 Repechages	Repechages quarterfinals	Semifinals	Repechages semifinals	Final / BM	
Athlete	Event	1/16 finals	Quarterfinals	1/16 Repechages	Repechages quarterfinals	Semifinals	Repechages semifinals	Opposition	Rank
Pencho Dochev	Men's lightweight	Cova (VEN); W	Szilagyi (HUN); W	N/A		Karachenko (UKR); L	Khliusin (UKR); W	Semykras (UKR); L	4

=== Openweight ===
Main rounds

Athlete	Event	1/64 finals	1/32 finals	1/16 finals	Quarterfinals	Semifinals	Final	
Athlete	Event	1/64 finals	1/32 finals	1/16 finals	Quarterfinals	Semifinals	Opposition	Rank
Pencho Dochev	Men's openweight	Elsefy (EGY); W	Szilagyi (HUN); W	Swora (POL); L	DNQ			
