= Brazil at the 2022 World Games =

- IOC code: BRA
- NOC: Brazilian Olympic Committee

in Birmingham, United States 7 July 2022 – 17 July 2022
- Competitors: 74 (38 men and 36 women) in 17 sports
- Medals Ranked 28th: Gold 2 Silver 1 Bronze 5 Total 8

World Games appearances
- 1981; 1985; 1989; 1993; 1997; 2001; 2005; 2009; 2013; 2017; 2022; 2025

Brazil competed at the 2022 World Games held in Birmingham, Alabama, United States from 7 to 17 July 2022. Athletes representing Brazil won two gold medals, one silver medal and five bronze medals. The country finished in 28th place in the medal table.

== Medalists ==
Medal	Name	Sport	Event	Date
Gold	Vinícius Figueira	Karate	Men's kumite 67 kg	8 July
Gold	Lucas Barbosa; Tamires Silva	Aerobic gymnastics	Mixed pair	12 July
Silver	Douglas Brose	Karate	Men's kumite 60 kg	8 July
Bronze	Rui Júnior	Sumo	Men's heavyweight	9 July
Bronze	Women's team	Fistball	Women's tournament	13 July
Bronze	Men's team	Fistball	Men's tournament	14 July
Bronze	Men's team	Beach handball	Men's tournament	15 July

=== Invitational sports ===
Medal	Name	Sport	Event	Date
Bronze	Michele Santos	Wushu	Women's changquan	13 July

== Competitors ==
The following is the list of number of competitors in the Games.

Sport	Men	Women	Total
Aerobic gymnastics	1	1	2
Artistic roller skating	1	1	2
Beach handball	10	0	10
Cue sports	1	0	1
Dancesport	1	0	1
Fistball	10	10	10
Flag football	0	12	12
Karate	2	1	3
Kickboxing	1	0	1
Orienteering	2	2	4
Powerlifting	4	3	7
Rhythmic gymnastics	—N/a	1	1
Squash	1	0	1
Sumo	3	3	6
Track speed skating	0	1	1
Water skiing	1	0	1
Wushu	0	1	1
Total	38	36	74

== Aerobic gymnastics ==
Brazil won one gold medal in aerobic gymnastics.

== Artistic roller skating ==
Brazil competed in artistic roller skating.

== Beach handball ==
Brazil won one bronze medal in beach handball.

== Cue sports ==
Brazil competed in cue sports.

Athlete	Event	Round of 16	Quarterfinal	Semifinal	Final / BM
Athlete	Event	Opposition Result	Opposition Result	Opposition Result	Opposition Result
Victor Sarkis	Snooker	Shahin (EGY); L 0–3	did not advance		

== Dancesport ==
Brazil competed in dancesport (breaking).

== Fistball ==
Brazil won the bronze medal in both the men's and women's fistball tournaments.

== Flag football ==
Brazil competed in flag football.

== Karate ==
Brazil won two medals in karate.

Men

Athlete	Event	Elimination round				Semifinal	Final / BM	
Athlete	Event	Opposition Result	Opposition Result	Opposition Result	Rank	Opposition Result	Opposition Result	Rank
Douglas Brose	Men's kumite 60 kg	Jina (MAR); W 6–0	Shaaban (KUW); D 0–0	Kalniņš (LAT); W 2–0	1 Q	Crescenzo (ITA); W 4–2	Ayoub Anis (ALG); L 0–4	2nd place, silver medalist(s)
Vinícius Figueira	Men's kumite 67 kg	Pavlov (MKD); W 4–0	Nakano (JPN); D 0–0	Xenos (GRE); D 0–0	2 Q	Maresca (ITA); W 1–0	Tadissi (HUN); W 4–0	1st place, gold medalist(s)

Women

Athlete	Event	Elimination round				Semifinal	Final / BM	
Athlete	Event	Opposition Result	Opposition Result	Opposition Result	Rank	Opposition Result	Opposition Result	Rank
Valéria Kumizaki	Women's kumite 55 kg	Terliuga (UKR); D 3–3	Warling (LUX); L 0–1	Goranova (BUL); L 0–1	4	Did not advance		7

== Kickboxing ==
Brazil competed in kickboxing.

Athlete	Category	Quarterfinals	Semifinals	Final/Bronze medal bout	
Athlete	Category	Opposition Result	Opposition Result	Opposition Result	Rank
Vinicius Oliveira Mestrinier	Men's 63.5 kg	Martínez (MEX); L 0–3	did not advance		

== Orienteering ==
Brazil competed in orienteering.

== Powerlifting ==
Brazil competed in powerlifting.

== Rhythmic gymnastics ==
Brazil competed in rhythmic gymnastics.

== Squash ==
Brazil competed in squash.

== Sumo ==
Brazil won one bronze medal in sumo.

== Track speed skating ==
One competitor was scheduled to represent Brazil in track speed skating.

== Water skiing ==
Brazil competed in water skiing.

== Wushu ==
Brazil won one bronze medal in wushu.
