= Japan at the 2022 World Games =

- IOC code: JPN
- NOC: Japanese Olympic Committee

in Birmingham, United States 7 July 2022 – 17 July 2022
- Competitors: 138 (57 men and 81 women) in 23 sports
- Medals Ranked 8th: Gold 10 Silver 11 Bronze 12 Total 33

World Games appearances
- 1981; 1985; 1989; 1993; 1997; 2001; 2005; 2009; 2013; 2017; 2022; 2025

Japan competed at the 2022 World Games held in Birmingham, United States from 7 to 17 July 2022. Athletes representing Japan won 10 gold medals, 11 silver medals and 12 bronze medals. The country finished in 8th place in the medal table.

== Medalists ==
Medal	Name	Sport	Event	Date
Gold	Kazumasa Moto	Karate	Men's kata	8 July
Gold	Yusuke Satake	Powerlifting	Men's lightweight	8 July
Gold	Yukako Fukushima	Powerlifting	Women's lightweight	8 July
Gold	Hidetora Hanada	Sumo	Men's heavyweight	9 July
Gold	Daiki Nakamura	Sumo	Men's openweight	9 July
Gold	Yuka Okutomi	Sumo	Women's lightweight	9 July
Gold	Sakura Ishii	Sumo	Women's middleweight	9 July
Gold	Ami Yuasa	Dancesport	B-Girls	10 July
Gold	Hinata Yoshihara	Water skiing	Women's wakeboard	16 July
Gold	Miho Nonaka	Sport climbing	Women's boulder	15 July
Silver	Hikaru Ono	Karate	Women's kata	8 July
Silver	Shion Fujisawa	Sumo	Men's middleweight	9 July
Silver	Daiki Nakamura	Sumo	Men's heavyweight	9 July
Silver	Miku Yamanaka	Sumo	Women's lightweight	9 July
Silver	Hiyori Kon	Sumo	Women's openweight	10 July
Silver	Women's team	Softball	Women's tournament	13 July
Silver	Kokoro Fujii	Sport climbing	Men's boulder	15 July
Silver	Masahiro Higuchi	Sport climbing	Men's lead	16 July
Silver	Natsuki Tanii	Sport climbing	Women's lead	16 July
Bronze	Miho Miyahara	Karate	Women's kumite 50 kg	8 July
Bronze	Airi Hisano	Sumo	Women's heavyweight	9 July
Bronze	Ayumi Fukushima	Dancesport	B-Girls	10 July
Bronze	Shigeyuki Nakarai	Dancesport	B-Boys	10 July
Bronze	Naoya Hirano; Takahiro Itaba; Yoshiharu Takasu; Suguru Ando	Lifesaving	Men's 4 × 50 m obstacle relay	10 July
Bronze	Hikari Izumi	Parkour	Women's freestyle	10 July
Bronze	Hikari Izumi	Parkour	Women's speed	11 July
Bronze	Ryohei Taniguchi	Trampoline gymnastics	Men's double mini-trampoline	15 July
Bronze	Yoshiyuki Ogata	Sport climbing	Men's boulder	15 July
Bronze	Mao Nakamura	Sport climbing	Women's boulder	15 July
Bronze	Yuki Hiraguchi	Cue sports	Women's nine-ball pool	16 July

=== Invitational sports ===
Medal	Name	Sport	Event	Date
Silver	Ai Ueda	Duathlon	Women's individual	16 July
Silver	Mixed team	Wheelchair rugby	Mixed tournament	17 July
Bronze	Men's team	Lacrosse	Men's tournament	12 July

Medals by sport
Sport	1st place, gold medalist(s)	2nd place, silver medalist(s)	3rd place, bronze medalist(s)	Total
Sumo	4	4	1	5
Powerlifting	2	0	0	2
Sport climbing	1	3	2	6
Karate	1	1	1	3
Dancesport	1	0	2	3
Water skiing	1	0	0	1
Duathlon	0	1	0	1
Softball	0	1	0	1
Wheelchair rugby	0	1	0	1
Parkour	0	0	2	2
Cue sports	0	0	1	1
Lacrosse	0	0	1	1
Lifesaving	0	0	1	1
Trampoline gymnastics	0	0	1	1
Total	10	11	12	33

== Competitors ==
The following is the list of number of competitors in the Games.

Sport	Men	Women	Total
Air sports	1	1	2
Archery	1	0	1
Canoe marathon	1	1	2
Cue sports	1	1	2
Dancesport	3	3	6
Duathlon	1	1	2
Finswimming	1	0	1
Flag football	0	12	12
Flying disc	8	7	15
Karate	2	2	4
Lacrosse	12	12	24
Lifesaving	5	5	10
Parkour	1	1	2
Powerlifting	2	1	3
Racquetball	0	1	1
Rhythmic gymnastics	—N/a	2	2
Softball	0	15	15
Sport climbing	3	4	7
Squash	0	2	2
Sumo	5	7	12
Trampoline gymnastics	2	1	3
Water skiing	1	1	2
Wheelchair rugby	7	1	8
Total	57	81	138

== Air sports ==
Japan competed in drone racing.

== Archery ==
Japan competed in archery.

Athlete	Event	Qualification		Elimination 1	Elimination 2	Elimination 3	Elimination 4	Semifinal	Final / BM	
Athlete	Event	Score	Rank	Opposition Result	Opposition Result	Opposition Result	Opposition Result	Opposition Result	Opposition Result	Rank
Wataru Oonuki	Men's recurve	353	8	Bye	(Slovakia) Habjan Malavašič; W 93–92	(Croatia) Remar; L 80^{4}–80^{5}	did not advance			

== Canoe marathon ==
Japan competed in canoe marathon.

== Cue sports ==
Japan won one bronze medal in cue sports.

== Dancesport ==
Japan won three medals in dancesport.

== Duathlon ==
Japan won one silver medal in duathlon.

== Finswimming ==
Japan competed in finswimming.

== Flag football ==
Japan competed in flag football.

== Flying disc ==
Japan competed in the flying disc competition.

== Karate ==
Japan won three medals in karate.

Men

Athlete	Event	Elimination round				Semifinal	Final / BM	
Athlete	Event	Opposition Result	Opposition Result	Opposition Result	Rank	Opposition Result	Opposition Result	Rank
Kazumasa Moto	Men's kata	Cención (PAN); W 25.74–23.98	Heydarov (AZE); W 26.34–22.68	Tozaki (USA); W 26.46–25.94	1 Q	Busato (ITA); W 27.12–25.52	Quintero (ESP); W 26.60–26.26	1st place, gold medalist(s)
Soichiro Nakano	Men's kumite 67 kg	Xenos (GRE); L 0–1	Figueira (BRA); D 0–0	Pavlov (MKD); W 4–0	3	Did not advance		5

Women

Athlete	Event	Elimination round				Semifinal	Final / BM	
Athlete	Event	Opposition Result	Opposition Result	Opposition Result	Rank	Opposition Result	Opposition Result	Rank
Hikaru Ono	Women's kata	Ismail (EGY); W 25.46–24.28	Kokumai (USA); W 25.46–24.00	Lau (HKG); W 25.52–25.06	1 Q	Casale (ITA); W 26.34–25.08	Sánchez (ESP); L 27.92–27.00	2nd place, silver medalist(s)
Miho Miyahara	Women's kumite 50 kg	Kryva (UKR); W 2–1	Gu (TPE); W 7–2	Alexander (USA); W 1–1	1 Q	Tsukii (PHI); L 3–4	Gu (TPE); W 4–0	3rd place, bronze medalist(s)

== Lacrosse ==
Japan won the bronze medal in the men's lacrosse tournament.

== Lifesaving ==
Japan won one bronze medal in lifesaving.

== Parkour ==
Japan won two bronze medals in parkour.

== Powerlifting ==
Japan won two gold medals in powerlifting.

== Racquetball ==
Japan competed in racquetball.

== Rhythmic gymnastics ==
Japan competed in rhythmic gymnastics.

== Softball ==
Japan won the silver medal in the softball tournament.

== Sport climbing ==
Japan won six medals in sport climbing.

== Squash ==
Japan competed in squash.

== Sumo ==
Japan won nine medals in sumo.

== Trampoline gymnastics ==
Japan won one bronze medal in trampoline gymnastics.

== Water skiing ==
Japan won one gold medal in water skiing.

== Wheelchair rugby ==
Japan won the silver medal in the wheelchair rugby tournament.
