= Belgium at the 2022 World Games =

- IOC code: BEL
- NOC: Belgian Olympic Committee

in Birmingham, Alabama, United States 7 July 2022 – 17 July 2022
- Competitors: 75 in 22 sports
- Medals Ranked 7th: Gold 11 Silver 4 Bronze 5 Total 20

World Games appearances (overview)
- 1981; 1985; 1989; 1993; 1997; 2001; 2005; 2009; 2013; 2017; 2022; 2025

Belgium competed at the 2022 World Games held in Birmingham, United States from 7 to 17 July 2022. Athletes representing Belgium won 11 gold medals, four silver medals and five bronze medals. The country finished in 7th place in the medal table.

== Medalists ==
Medal	Name	Sport	Event	Date
Gold	Bart Swings	Road speed skating	Men's 10,000 m point race	9 July
Gold	Bart Swings	Track speed skating	Men's 10,000 m elimination race	10 July
Gold	Bart Swings	Track speed skating	Men's 10,000 m point elimination race	10 July
Gold	Bart Swings	Road speed skating	Men's 15,000 m elimination race	12 July
Gold	Helena Heijens; Bram Roettger	Acrobatic gymnastics	Mixed pair	15 July
Gold	Florian Bayili	Ju-jitsu	Men's ne-waza 69 kg	15 July
Gold	Licai Pourtois	Ju-jitsu	Women's fighting 57 kg	15 July
Gold	Nicolas Collin	Sport climbing	Men's boulder	15 July
Gold	Kim Bergmans; Lise De Meyst; Bo Hollebosch	Acrobatic gymnastics	Women's group	16 July
Gold	Tinne Gilis	Squash	Women's singles	17 July
Silver	Ian Lodens; Charis Gravensteyn	Ju-jitsu	Mixed	16 July
Silver	Simon De Wever; Jonas Raus; Viktor Vermeire; Wannes Vlaeminck	Acrobatic gymnastics	Men's group	17 July
Silver	Team Belgium	Korfball	Mixed tournament	17 July
Bronze	Bart Swings	Track speed skating	Men's 1000 m sprint	9 July
Bronze	Jérémy Lorsignol	Parkour	Men's freestyle	11 July
Bronze	Sofie Boogaerts; Stefanie Lindekens; Aurelie Romanini; Nele Vanbuel	Lifesaving	Women's 4x25 m manikin relay	11 July
Bronze	Team Belgium	Tug of war	Men's outdoor 640 kg	15 July
Bronze	Eddy Merckx	Cue sports	Men's three-cushion carom	13 July

=== Invitational sports ===
Medal	Name	Sport	Event	Date
Gold	Maurine Ricour	Duathlon	Women's individual	16 July
Silver	Arnaud Delly; Maurine Ricour	Duathlon	Mixed relay	17 July

== Competitors ==
Sports	Men	Women	Total
Acrobatic gymnastics	5	4	9
Air sports	1	0	1
Archery	0	1	1
Billiards sports	1	0	1
Boules sports	0	2	2
Canoe marathon	1	0	1
Dancesport	1	2	3
Duathlon	3	3	6
Inline speed skating	1	0	1
Ju-jitsu	2	2	4
Karate	1	0	1
Kickboxing	0	1	1
Korfball	7	7	14
Lifesaving	5	5	10
Orienteering	1	0	1
Parkour	1	0	1
Powerlifting	1	0	1
Sport Climbing	2	1	3
Squash	0	1	1
Trampoline gymnastics	1	0	1
Tug of war	11	0	11
Waterskiing	1	0	1
Total	46	29	75

== Acrobatic gymnastics ==
Belgium won three medals in acrobatic gymnastics.

Athlete	Event	Qualification				Final	
Athlete	Event	Balance	Dynamic	Total		Final	
Athlete	Event	Balance	Dynamic	Result	Rank	Result	Rank
Helena Heijens; Bram Roettger	Mixed pair	29.980	29.830	59.810	1st Q	29.700	1st place, gold medalist(s)
Simon De Wever; Jonas Raus; Viktor Vermeire; Wannes Vlaeminck	Men's group	28.290	27.900	56.190	3rd Q	29.360	2nd place, silver medalist(s)
Kim Bergmans; Lise De Meyst; Bo Hollebosch	Women's group	27.750	28.630	56.380	3rd Q	29.970	1st place, gold medalist(s)

== Air sports ==
Belgium competed in drone racing.

Athlete	Event	Qualification		Round of 32	Round of 16	Repechage 2	Repechage 3	Quarterfinals	Repechage 4	Semi-finals	Final / BM	
Athlete	Event	Score	Rank	Score Rank	Score Rank	Score Rank	Score Rank	Score Rank	Score Rank	Score Rank	Score	Rank
Maximilien Pellichero	Drone racing	26.093227	16th	1:22.382848; 2nd Q	1:12.15104; 4th	1:15.966464; 1st Q	1:12.292352; 3rd	did not advance				14th

== Archery ==
Belgium competed in archery.

Athlete	Event	Ranking round		Round of 32	Round of 16	Quarterfinals	Semi-finals	Final / BM	
Athlete	Event	Score	Seed	Opposition Score	Opposition Score	Opposition Score	Opposition Score	Opposition Score	Rank
Sarah Prieels	Women's compound individual	694	12 Q	Mariana Zúñiga (CHI); W 136–135	Paige Pearce (USA); L 146–147	did not advance			

== Boules sports ==
Belgium competed in boules sports.

Athlete	Event	Qualification				Final	
Athlete	Event	Round 1		Round 2		Final	
Athlete	Event	Result	Rank	Result	Rank	Result	Rank
Jessica Meskens	Women's petanque precision shooting	24p	6th	22p	5th	did not advance	

Athlete	Event	Group stage				Semi-final	Final / BM	
Athlete	Event	Opposition Score	Opposition Score	Opposition Score	Rank	Opposition Score	Opposition Score	Rank
Nancy Barzin; Jessica Meskens	Women's petanque doubles	Verena Gabe; Eileen Jenal (GER); L 3 – 13	Janice Bissonnette; Rebeka Howe (USA); L 0 – 13	Nantawan Fue Angsanit; Phantipha Wongchuvej (THA); NM	4th	did not advance		

== Canoe marathon ==
Belgium competed in canoe marathon.

Athlete	Event	Qualification		Final	
Athlete	Event	Result	Rank	Result	Rank
Daan Cox	Men's short distance	14:50.94	14th Q	15:11.80	13th
Daan Cox	Men's long distance	—N/a		1:34:47.20	16th

== Cue sports ==
Belgium competed in cue sports.

Athlete	Event	Round of 16	Quarterfinals	Semi-finals	Final / BM	
Athlete	Event	Opposition Score	Opposition Score	Opposition Score	Opposition Score	Rank
Eddy Merckx	Men's three-cushion billiards	Erick Tellez (CRC); W 40 – 16	Dani Sánchez (ESP); W 40 – 38	Dick Jaspers (NED); L 16 – 40	Pedro Gonzalez (COL); W 40 – 24	3rd place, bronze medalist(s)

== Dancesport ==
Belgium competed in dancesport.

Athlete	Event	First round		Hope Round		Semi-final		Final			
Athlete	Event	First round		Hope Round		Semi-final		Foot Technique		Acrobatic	
Athlete	Event	Result	Rank	Result	Rank	Result	Rank	Result	Rank	Result	Rank
Marie Peters & Benedikt Andres	Rock'n'Roll	54.14	10th	60.14	4th Q	67.59	9th	did not advance			

Athlete	Event	Group stage				Quarterfinal	Semi-final	Final / BM	
Athlete	Event	Opposition Score	Opposition Score	Opposition Score	Rank	Opposition Score	Opposition Score	Opposition Score	Rank
Maxime Blieck	B-Girls	Camine Van Hoof (BEL); L 0 – 2	Sunny Choi (USA); L 1 – 1	Paulina Starus (POL); W 2 – 0	3rd	did not advance			
Camine Van Hoof	B-Girls	Maxime Blieck (BEL); W 2 – 0	Paulina Starus (POL); W 2 – 0	Sunny Choi (USA); L 0 – 2	2nd Q	Ami Yuasa (JPN); L 0 – 2	did not advance		

== Duathlon ==
Belgium competed in duathlon.

Athlete	Event	Final	
Athlete	Event	Result	Rank
Vincent Bierinckx	Men's race	1:50:12	6th
Arnaud Dely	Men's race	1:49:32	5th
Angelo Vandecasteele	Men's race	1:49:04	4th
Lotte Claes	Women's race	DSQ	
Maurine Ricour	Women's race	2:01:38	1st place, gold medalist(s)
Laura Swannet	Women's race	DSQ	
Arnaud Dely; Maurine Ricour	Mixed relay	1:19:25	2nd place, silver medalist(s)
Vincent Bierinckx; Lotte Claes	Mixed relay	1:20:00	4th

== Ju-jitsu ==
Belgium competed in ju-jitsu.

Athlete	Event	Group stage			Semi-final	Final / BM	
Athlete	Event	Opposition Score	Opposition Score	Rank	Opposition Score	Opposition Score	Rank
Florian Bayili	Men's ne-waza 69 kg	Adrian Milord (PAN); W 14 – 0	Valentin Blumental (FRA); W 6 – 2	1st Q	Viki Dabush (ISR); W 14 – 0	Mohamed Alsuwaidi (UAE); W ADV	1st place, gold medalist(s)
Licai Pourtois	Women's fighting 57 kg	Margarita Rosa Campos Obando (COL); W 14 – 0	Christina Koutoulaki (GRE); W 10 – 2	1st Q	Rebekka Ziska Dahl (DEN); W 16 – 4	Christina Koutoulaki (GRE); W walkover	1st place, gold medalist(s)
Charis Gravensteyn; Ian Lodens	Mixed duo	Warawut Saengsriruang; Lalita Yuennan (THA); L 69.5 – 72	Genoveva Dobre; Ionut Dobre (ROU); W 72 – 67.5	2nd Q	Sofia Jokl; Thomas Schoenenberger (SUI); W 71.5 – 69.5	Warawut Saengsriruang; Lalita Yuennan (THA); L 74.5 – 75	2nd place, silver medalist(s)

== Karate ==
Belgium competed in karate.

Athlete	Event	Group stage				Semi-final	Final / BM	
Athlete	Event	Opposition Score	Opposition Score	Opposition Score	Rank	Opposition Score	Opposition Score	Rank
Quentin Mahauden	Men's kumite 75 kg	Nurkanat Azhikanov (KAZ); 5 – 5 D	Stanislav Horuna (UKR); 0 – 2 L	Abdalla Abdelaziz (EGY); 4 – 12 L	4th	did not advance		7

== Kickboxing ==
Belgium competed in kickboxing.

Athlete	Event	Quarterfinals	Semi-finals	Final / BM	
Athlete	Event	Opposition Score	Opposition Score	Opposition Score	Rank
Hélène Connart	Women's 60 kg	Sofia Oliveira (POR); W 2 – 1	Milana Bjelogrlic (SRB); L 1 – 2	Alina Martyniuk (UKR); L 1 – 2	4th

== Korfball ==
Belgium won the silver medal in the korfball tournament.

Athlete	Event	Group stage				Semi-final	Final / BM	
Athlete	Event	Opposition Score	Opposition Score	Opposition Score	Rank	Opposition Score	Opposition Score	Rank
Team Belgium	Korfball	Germany (GER); W 26 – 9	China (CHN); W 27 – 11	Suriname (SUR); W 29 – 14	1st Q	Chinese Taipei (TPE); W 19 – 18	Netherlands (NED); L 12 – 23	2nd place, silver medalist(s)

== Lifesaving ==
Belgium competed in lifesaving.

Athlete	Event	Final	
Athlete	Event	Result	Rank
Corentin Stavart	Men's 100 m manikin tow with fins	53.46	6th
Aurelie Romanini	Women's 50 m manikin carry	36.18	6th
Bo Van de Plas	Women's 100 m manikin tow with fins	59.60	5th
Bo Van de Plas	Women's 200 m super lifesaver	2:25.57	4th
Joni Ceusters; Jeroen Lecoutere; Maarten Van Laethem; Jelle Vandersteen	Men's 4x25 m manikin relay	1:10.79	5th
Joni Ceusters; Jeroen Lecoutere; Corentin Stavart; Maarten Van Laethem	Men's 4x50 m obstacle relay	1:42.22	8th
Joni Ceusters; Jeroen Lecoutere; Corentin Stavart; Maarten Van Laethem	Men's 4x50 m medley relay	1:32.76	8th
Sofie Boogaerts; Stefanie Lindekens; Aurelie Romanini; Nele Vanbuel	Women's 4x25 m manikin relay	1:23.41	3rd place, bronze medalist(s)
Sofie Boogaerts; Stefanie Lindekens; Aurelie Romanini; Nele Vanbuel	Women's 4x50 m medley relay	1:43.18	8th
Sofie Boogaerts; Stefanie Lindekens; Aurelie Romanini; Bo Van de Plas	Women's 4x50 m obstacle relay	1:55.66	8th

== Orienteering ==
Belgium competed in orienteering.

Athlete	Event	Final	
Athlete	Event	Result	Rank
Yannick Michiels	Men's sprint	15:13	12th
Yannick Michiels	Men's middle distance	40:34	20th

== Parkour ==
Belgium won one bronze medal in parkour.

Athlete	Event	Qualification		Final	
Athlete	Event	Result	Rank	Result	Rank
Jérémy Lorsignol	Men's speedrun	24.59	5th Q	25.93	5th
Jérémy Lorsignol	Men's freestyle	19.5	6th Q	22.0	3rd place, bronze medalist(s)

== Powerlifting ==
Belgium competed in powerlifting.

Athlete	Event	Final	
Athlete	Event	Result	Rank
Jeroen Van Heesvelde	Men's heavyweight	96.40	9th

== Road speed skating ==
Belgium competed in road speed skating.

Athlete	Event	Final	
Athlete	Event	Result	Rank
Bart Swings	Men's 10,000 m point race	27p	1st place, gold medalist(s)
Bart Swings	Men's 15,000 m elimination race	25:43.092	1st place, gold medalist(s)

== Sport climbing ==
Belgium competed in sport climbing.

Athlete	Event	Qualification		Final	
Athlete	Event	Result	Rank	Result	Rank
Hannes Van Duysen	Men's boulder	1T4z	7th	did not advance	
Nicolas Collin	Men's boulder	2T3z	6th Q	4T4z	1st place, gold medalist(s)
Nicolas Collin	Men's lead	36+	3rd Q	22+	6th
Chloe Caulier	Women's boulder	2T4z	8th	did not advance	
Chloe Caulier	Women's lead	28+	8th Q	29	8th

== Squash ==
Belgium won one medal in squash.

Athlete	Event	Round of 32	Round of 16	Quarterfinals	Semi-finals	Final / BM	
Athlete	Event	Opposition Score	Opposition Score	Opposition Score	Opposition Score	Opposition Score	Rank
Tinne Gilis	Women's singles	—N/a	Nikki Todd (CAN); W 11 – 7, 11 – 4	Marina Stefanoni (USA); W 11 – 5, 11 – 7	Coline Aumard (FRA); W 11 – 7, 11 – 9, 11 – 6	Lucy Beecroft (GBR); W 11 – 9, 11 – 7, 11 – 6	1st place, gold medalist(s)

== Track speed skating ==
Belgium competed in track speed skating.

Athlete	Event	Preliminary Round		Semi-finals		Final	
Athlete	Event	Result	Rank	Result	Rank	Result	Rank
Bart Swings	Men's 1000 m sprint	1:24.765	6th Q	1:23.931	1st Q	1:27.339	3rd place, bronze medalist(s)
Bart Swings	Men's 10,000 m point elimination race	—N/a				18p	1st place, gold medalist(s)
Bart Swings	Men's 10,000 m elimination race	—N/a				15:16.914	1st place, gold medalist(s)

== Trampoline gymnastics ==
Belgium competed in trampoline gymnastics.

Athlete	Event	Qualification		Final 1		Final 2	
Athlete	Event	Result	Rank	Result	Rank	Result	Rank
Sam Dhoop	Men's tumbling	50.600	7th Q	21.300	8th	did not advance	

== Tug of war ==
Belgium won one medal in tug of war.

Athlete	Event	Group stage						Semi-final	Final / BM	
Athlete	Event	Opposition Score	Opposition Score	Opposition Score	Opposition Score	Opposition Score	Rank	Opposition Score	Opposition Score	Rank
Team Belgium	Men's outdoor 640 kg	Italy (ITA); D 1 – 1	Great Britain (GBR); L 0 – 3	Germany (GER); D 1 – 1	Netherlands (NED); W 3 – 0	Switzerland (SUI); L 0 – 3	4th Q	Switzerland (SUI); L 0 – 2	Germany (GER); W 2 – 0	3rd place, bronze medalist(s)

== Water skiing ==
Belgium competed in water skiing.

Athlete	Event	Qualification		Final	
Athlete	Event	Result	Rank	Result	Rank
Olivier Fortamps	Men's tricks	9810p	5th Q	9410p	5th
