= Croatia at the 2022 World Games =

- IOC code: CRO
- NOC: Croatian Olympic Committee

in Birmingham, United States 7 July 2022 – 17 July 2022
- Competitors: 21 (16 men and 5 women) in 7 sports
- Medals Ranked 24th: Gold 2 Silver 5 Bronze 0 Total 7

World Games appearances
- 1981; 1985; 1989; 1993; 1997; 2001; 2005; 2009; 2013; 2017; 2022; 2025

Croatia competed at the 2022 World Games held in Birmingham, United States from 7 to 17 July 2022. Athletes representing Croatia won two gold medals and five silver medals. The country finished in 24th place in the medal table.

== Medalists ==
Medal	Name	Sport	Event	Date
Gold	Nives Jelovica	Boules sports	Women's lyonnaise precision shooting	13 July
Gold	Men's team	Beach handball	Men's tournament	15 July
Silver	Filip Strikinac	Finswimming	Men's 100 m surface	8 July
Silver	Dora Bassi	Finswimming	Women's 200 m surface	8 July
Silver	Anđelo Kvesić	Karate	Men's kumite +84 kg	9 July
Silver	Ria Vojković	Boules sports	Women's lyonnaise progressive shooting	12 July
Silver	Anto Širić	Kickboxing	Men's +91 kg	14 July

== Competitors ==
The following is the list of number of competitors in the Games.

Sport	Men	Women	Total
Archery	1	1	2
Beach handball	10	0	10
Boules sports	0	2	2
Dancesport	1	1	2
Finswimming	1	1	2
Karate	2	0	2
Kickboxing	1	0	1
Total	16	5	21

== Archery ==
Croatia competed in archery.

Men

Athlete	Event	Qualification		Elimination 1	Elimination 2	Elimination 3	Elimination 4	Semi-final	Final / BM	
Athlete	Event	Score	Rank	Opposition Result	Opposition Result	Opposition Result	Opposition Result	Opposition Result	Opposition Result	Rank
Alen Remar	Men's recurve	360	5	Bye		Oonuki (JPN); W 80^{5}–80^{4}	Morello (ITA); L 81–87	did not advance		

Women

Athlete	Event	Ranking round		Round of 32	Round of 16	Quarterfinals	Semi-finals	Final / BM	
Athlete	Event	Score	Seed	Opposition Result	Opposition Result	Opposition Result	Opposition Result	Opposition Result	Rank
Amanda Mlinarić	Women's compound	693	13	(South Korea) Ryu Ye-in; W 139–133	(United States) Linda Ochoa-Anderson; L 142–145	did not advance			

== Beach handball ==
Croatia won the gold medal in the men's beach handball tournament.

== Boules sports ==
Croatia won two medals in boules sports.

== Dancesport ==
Croatia competed in dancesport.

== Finswimming ==
Croatia won two silver medals in finswimming.

== Karate ==
Croatia won one silver medal in karate.

Men

Athlete	Event	Elimination round				Semi-final	Final / BM	
Athlete	Event	Opposition Result	Opposition Result	Opposition Result	Rank	Opposition Result	Opposition Result	Rank
Ivan Kvesić	Men's kumite 84 kg	Madani (USA); L 1–2	Da Costa (FRA); W 8–6	Huaiquimán (CHI); W 7–1	2 Q	Badawy (EGY); L 4–4	Madani (USA); L 0–4	4
Anđelo Kvesić	Men's kumite +84 kg	Daniel (AUS); W 9–0	Tarek (EGY); W 5–3	Irr (USA); L 0–2	1 Q	Talibov (UKR); W 7–2	Seck (ESP); L 0–1	2nd place, silver medalist(s)

== Kickboxing ==
Croatia won one silver medal in kickboxing.

Athlete	Category	Quarterfinals	Semi-finals	Final/Bronze medal bout	
Athlete	Category	Opposition Result	Opposition Result	Opposition Result	Rank
Anto Širić	Men's +91 kg	Tktok (ISR); W 3–0	Suksi (FIN); W 3–0	Rajabzadeh (AZE); L 0–3	2nd place, silver medalist(s)
