= Powerlifting at the 2022 World Games – Women's lightweight =

Powerlifting - Women's lightweight at the 2022 World Games
- Venue: Birmingham Jefferson Convention Complex, Birmingham, United States
- Dates: 8 July 2022
- Competitors: 11 from 9 nations

Medalists
gold medal	Yukako Fukushima	Japan
silver medal	Zuzanna Kula	Poland
bronze medal	Anastasiia Derevianko	Ukraine

The women's lightweight competition in powerlifting at the 2022 World Games took place on 8 July 2022 at the Birmingham Jefferson Convention Complex in Birmingham, United States.

== Competition format ==
A total of 11 athletes entered the competition, combining the 47 and 52 kilogram weight class. Each athlete had 3 attempts in each of 3 events: squat, bench press and deadlift. The athlete with the biggest score in Wilks points is the winner.

== Results ==
Rank	Athlete	Nation	Squat			Bench press			Deadlift			Total weight	Total points
Rank	Athlete	Nation	1	2	3	1	2	3	1	2	3	Total weight	Total points
1st place, gold medalist(s)	Yukako Fukushima	Japan	172.5	~~182.5~~	~~182.5~~	120.0	125.0	127.5	155.0	165.0	170.0	470.0	104.08
2nd place, silver medalist(s)	Zuzanna Kula	Poland	~~200.0~~	200.0	~~205.0~~	120.0	125.0	130.0	137.5	157.5	167.5	497.5	103.05
3rd place, bronze medalist(s)	Anastasiia Derevianko	Ukraine	177.5	~~185.0~~	187.5	112.5	115.0	~~117.5~~	167.5	175.0	180.0	482.5	100.72
4	Karen Hesthammer	Norway	~~182.5~~	190.0	~~197.5~~	~~102.5~~	~~102.5~~	102.5	162.5	170.0	175.0	467.5	95.85
5	Stephanie Legard	France	160.0	~~167.5~~	167.5	90.0	~~95.0~~	95.0	152.5	160.0	165.0	427.5	94.67
6	Trine Bagger	Denmark	162.5	167.5	~~170.0~~	97.5	100.0	102.5	172.5	180.0	~~185.0~~	450.0	92.20
	Emma Goodwin	(United Kingdom) Great Britain	167.5	~~175.0~~	177.5	75.0	~~80.0~~	80.0	~~185.0~~	~~185.0~~	~~185.0~~	—	DSQ
	Tetiana Bila	Ukraine	180.0	~~187.5~~	187.5	~~115.0~~	~~115.0~~	~~115.0~~	—	—	—	—	DSQ
	Paulina Szymanel	Poland	180.0	~~187.5~~	187.5	~~117.5~~	~~117.5~~	~~117.5~~	~~165.0~~	172.5	180.0	—	DSQ
	Irani Rodrigues	Brazil	170.0	180.0	185.0	~~97.5~~	~~97.5~~	~~97.5~~	152.5	~~162.5~~	162.5	—	DSQ
	Maria Luisa Vasquez	Puerto Rico	172.5	~~177.5~~	~~177.5~~	~~95.0~~	~~95.0~~	~~95.0~~	~~145.0~~	—	—	—	DSQ
