= Azerbaijan at the 2022 World Games =

- IOC code: AZE
- NOC: National Olympic Committee of the Azerbaijani Republic

in Birmingham, United States 7 July 2022 – 17 July 2022
- Competitors: 15 (8 men and 7 women) in 3 sports
- Medals Ranked 45th: Gold 1 Silver 0 Bronze 1 Total 2

World Games appearances
- 1981; 1985; 1989; 1993; 1997; 2001; 2005; 2009; 2013; 2017; 2022

Azerbaijan competed at the 2022 World Games held in Birmingham, United States from 7 to 17 July 2022. Athletes representing Azerbaijan won one gold medal and one bronze medal. The country finished in 45th place in the medal table.

== Medalists ==
Medal	Name	Sport	Event	Date
Gold	Bahram Rajabzadeh	Kickboxing	Men's +91 kg	14 July
Bronze	Vladimir Dolmatov; Madina Mustafayeva; Khadija Guliyeva; Rauf Hajiyev; Sanan Mahmudlu; Nigar Mir Jalalli; Nazrin Mustafayeva; Aykhan Ahmadli	Aerobic gymnastics	Dance	12 July

== Competitors ==
The following is the list of number of competitors participating in the Games:

Sport	Men	Women	Total
Aerobic gymnastics	5	5	10
Karate	2	1	3
Kickboxing	1	0	1
Rhythmic gymnastics	—	1	1
Total	8	7	15

== Gymnastics ==
=== Aerobic ===
Azerbaijan won one bronze medal in aerobic gymnastics.

Athletes	Event	Qualification						Final					
Athletes	Event	D	A	E	Pen	Total	Rank	D	A	E	Pen	Total	Rank
Vladimir Dolmatov; Madina Mustafayeva; Khadija Guliyeva; Rauf Hajiyev; Sanan Mahmudlu; Nigar Mir Jalalli; Nazrin Mustafayeva; Aykhan Ahmadli	Dance	—	8.600	8.350	N/A	16.950	4 Q	—	8.750	8.500	N/A	17.250	3rd place, bronze medalist(s)
Vladimir Dolmatov; Madina Mustafayeva; Khoshgadam Guliyeva; Imran Imranov; Khadija Guliyeva	Group	2.333	8.150	7.650	0.200	17.933	6 R2	did not advance					

=== Rhythmic ===
Azerbaijan competed in rhythmic gymnastics.

Athlete	Event	Qualification		Final	
Athlete	Event	Score	Rank	Score	Rank
Zohra Aghamirova	Ball	28.700	16	did not advance	
Zohra Aghamirova	Clubs	30.400	7 Q	29.250	7
Zohra Aghamirova	Hoop	31.050	8 Q	31.450	5
Zohra Aghamirova	Ribbon	23.900	21	did not advance	

== Karate ==
Azerbaijan competed in karate.

Men

Athlete	Event	Elimination round				Semifinal	Final / BM	
Athlete	Event	Opposition Result	Opposition Result	Opposition Result	Rank	Opposition Result	Opposition Result	Rank
Roman Heydarov	Men's kata	Tozaki (USA); L 23.46–25.40	Moto (JPN); L 22.68–26.34	Cención (PAN); W 24.78–24.54	3	Did not advance		5
Asiman Gurbanli	Men's kumite +84 kg	Talibov (UKR); L 1–4	Seck Sakho (ESP); L 3–8	—	3	Did not advance		5

Women

Athlete	Event	Elimination round				Semifinal	Final / BM	
Athlete	Event	Opposition Result	Opposition Result	Opposition Result	Rank	Opposition Result	Opposition Result	Rank
Irina Zaretska	Women's kumite 68 kg	Quirici (SUI); W 9–1	Melnyk (UKR); W 5–1	Agier (FRA); L 4–7	2 Q	Semeraro (ITA); L 1–3	Agier (FRA); L 4–8	4

== Kickboxing ==
Azerbaijan won one gold medal in kickboxing.

Athlete	Event	Quarterfinal	Semifinal	Final / BM	
Athlete	Event	Opposition Result	Opposition Result	Opposition Result	Rank
Bahram Rajabzadeh	Men's +91 kg	Anders (USA); W WO	Shcherbatiuk (UKR); W 3–0	Širić (CRO); W 3–0	1st place, gold medalist(s)
