= Finswimming at the 2022 World Games – Men's 100 m bi-fins =

Finswimming – Men's bi-fins 100 m at the 2022 World Games
- Venue: Birmingham CrossPlex, Birmingham, United States
- Dates: 8 July 2022
- Competitors: 8 from 6 nations

Medalists
gold medal	(Hungary) Péter Holoda
silver medal	(Poland) Szymon Kropidłowski
bronze medal	(Greece) Christos Ioannis Bonias

The men's bi-fins 100 m event in finswimming at the 2022 World Games took place on 8 July 2022 at the Birmingham CrossPlex in Birmingham, United States.

== Competition format ==
A total of 8 athletes entered the competition. Only final was held.

== Results ==
=== Final ===
Rank	Athlete	Nation	Time
1st place, gold medalist(s)	Péter Holoda	Hungary	42.35
2nd place, silver medalist(s)	Szymon Kropidłowski	Poland	42.41
3rd place, bronze medalist(s)	Christos Ioannis Bonias	Greece	42.59
4	Stylianos Chatziiliadis	Greece	42.68
5	Kelen Cséplő	Hungary	42.92
6	Viktor Riepin	Ukraine	43.12
7	Adrien Ghirardi	France	43.70
8	Ahmed Ehab Ibrahim	Egypt	44.81
