= Karate at the 2022 World Games =

- Venue: Birmingham–Southern College
- Dates: 8–9 July
- No. of events: 12
- Competitors: 94 from 41 nations

The karate competition at the 2022 World Games took place in July 2022, in Birmingham, Alabama, United States, at the Birmingham–Southern College. Originally scheduled to take place in July 2021, the Games were rescheduled for 8 and 9 July 2022 as a result of the postponement of the 2020 Summer Olympics due to the COVID-19 pandemic.

== Participating nations ==
- Algeria (1)
- Australia (1)
- Austria (1)
- Azerbaijan (3)
- Belgium (1)
- Brazil (3)
- Bulgaria (1)
- Canada (3)
- Chinese Taipei (2)
- Chile (2)
- Croatia (2)
- Czech Republic (1)
- Egypt (7)
- Finland (1)
- France (2)
- Germany (3)
- Greece (2)
- Hong Kong (1)
- Hungary (2)
- Italy (5)
- Japan (4)
- Kazakhstan (3)
- Kuwait (1)
- Latvia (1)
- Luxembourg (1)
- Morocco (2)
- Netherlands (2)
- New Zealand (1)
- North Macedonia (1)
- Panama (1)
- Peru (1)
- Philippines (1)
- Slovakia (1)
- Spain (5)
- Sweden (1)
- Switzerland (2)
- Tunisia (1)
- Ukraine (6)
- United States (12)
- Uzbekistan (1)
- Venezuela (2)

== Medal table ==
* Host nation (United States)

Rank	Nation	Gold	Silver	Bronze	Total
1	Spain	2	2	0	4
2	Egypt	2	1	1	4
3	Ukraine	2	1	0	3
4	Japan	1	1	1	3
5	Brazil	1	1	0	2
6	Italy	1	0	1	2
7	Algeria	1	0	0	1
7	Kazakhstan	1	0	0	1
7	Philippines	1	0	0	1
10	Austria	0	1	0	1
10	Croatia	0	1	0	1
10	Hungary	0	1	0	1
10	Morocco	0	1	0	1
10	Peru	0	1	0	1
10	Venezuela	0	1	0	1
16	United States*	0	0	3	3
17	France	0	0	1	1
17	Greece	0	0	1	1
17	Hong Kong	0	0	1	1
17	Slovakia	0	0	1	1
17	Tunisia	0	0	1	1
17	Uzbekistan	0	0	1	1
Totals (22 entries)		12	12	12	36

== Medalists ==
=== Men ===
Event	Gold	Silver	Bronze
Kata	Kazumasa Moto; Japan	Damián Quintero; Spain	Gakuji Tozaki; United States
Kumite 60 kg	Ayoub Anis Helassa; Algeria	Douglas Brose; Brazil	Angelo Crescenzo; Italy
Kumite 67 kg	Vinícius Figueira; Brazil	Yves Martial Tadissi; Hungary	Dionysios Xenos; Greece
Kumite 75 kg	Abdalla Abdelaziz; Egypt	Stanislav Horuna; Ukraine	Dastonbek Otabolaev; Uzbekistan
Kumite 84 kg	Youssef Badawy; Egypt	Nabil Ech-chaabi; Morocco	Kamran Madani; United States
Kumite +84 kg	Babacar Seck; Spain	Anđelo Kvesić; Croatia	Taha Tarek; Egypt

=== Women ===
Event	Gold	Silver	Bronze
Kata	Sandra Sánchez; Spain	Hikaru Ono; Japan	Grace Lau; Hong Kong
Kumite 50 kg	Junna Tsukii; Philippines	Yorgelis Salazar; Venezuela	Miho Miyahara; Japan
Kumite 55 kg	Anzhelika Terliuga; Ukraine	Ahlam Youssef; Egypt	Trinity Allen; United States
Kumite 61 kg	Anita Serogina; Ukraine	Alexandra Grande; Peru	Ingrida Suchánková; Slovakia
Kumite 68 kg	Silvia Semeraro; Italy	Alisa Buchinger; Austria	Alizée Agier; France
Kumite +68 kg	Sofya Berultseva; Kazakhstan	María Torres; Spain	Chehinez Jemi; Tunisia
