= Sport climbing at the 2022 World Games – Women's boulder =

Women's boulder at the 2022 World Games
- Venue: Sloss Furnaces, Birmingham, United States
- Dates: 15 July
- Competitors: 12 from 9 nations

Medalists
gold medal	Miho Nonaka	Japan
silver medal	Katja Debevec	Slovenia
bronze medal	Mao Nakamura	Japan

The women's boulder competition in sport climbing at the 2022 World Games took place on 15 July 2022 at the Sloss Furnaces in Birmingham, United States.

== Results ==
=== Qualification ===
Rank	Athlete	Boulder				Result	Notes
Rank	Athlete	1	2	3	4	Result	Notes
1	Mao Nakamura (JPN)	T	T	T	T	4T4z 6 4	Q
2	Kylie Cullen (USA)	T	T	T	T	4T4z 7 5	Q
3	Sofya Yokoyama (SUI)	T	T	T	z	3T4z 3 4	Q
3	Ayala Kerem (ISR)	T	T	T	z	3T4z 3 4	Q
3	Miho Nonaka (JPN)	T	T	T	z	3T4z 3 4	Q
6	Katja Debevec (SLO)	T	z	T	T	3T4z 4 4	Q
7	Zélia Avezou (FRA)	T	T	T	z	3T4z 5 4	
8	Chloé Caulier (BEL)	z	T	T	z	2T4z 3 7	
9	Cloe Coscoy (USA)	z	z	T	T	2T4z 5 8	
10	Oriane Bertone (FRA)	z	z	T	z	1T4z 5 6	
11	Lauren Mukheibir (RSA)	z	–	–	z	0T2z 0 14	
12	Grace Crowley (AUS)	–	–	–	z	0T1z 0 6	

=== Final ===
Rank	Athlete	Boulder				Result
Rank	Athlete	1	2	3	4	Result
1st place, gold medalist(s)	Miho Nonaka (JPN)	T	z	T	T	3T4z 6 7
2nd place, silver medalist(s)	Katja Debevec (SLO)	z	z	T	T	2T4z 3 5
3rd place, bronze medalist(s)	Mao Nakamura (JPN)	z	z	T	T	2T4z 5 7
4	Sofya Yokoyama (SUI)	T	z	T	z	2T4z 8 6
5	Kylie Cullen (USA)	z	z	z	T	1T4z 2 7
6	Ayala Kerem (ISR)	z	z	T	z	1T4z 4 10
