= Finswimming at the 2022 World Games – Women's 200 m surface =

Finswimming – Women's 200 m surface at the 2022 World Games
- Venue: Birmingham CrossPlex, Birmingham, United States
- Dates: 8 July 2022
- Competitors: 8 from 7 nations

Medalists
gold medal	(Ukraine) Sofiia Hrechko
silver medal	(Croatia) Dora Bassi
bronze medal	(Hungary) Csilla Károlyi

The women's 200 m surface event in finswimming at the 2022 World Games took place on 8 July 2022 at the Birmingham CrossPlex in Birmingham, United States.

== Competition format ==
A total of eight athletes entered the competition. Only final was held.

== Results ==
=== Final ===
Rank	Athlete	Nation	Time
1st place, gold medalist(s)	Sofiia Hrechko	Ukraine	1:29.57
2nd place, silver medalist(s)	Dora Bassi	Croatia	1:30.46
3rd place, bronze medalist(s)	Csilla Károlyi	Hungary	1:30.54
4	Xu Yichuan	China	1:30.59
5	Eirini Deligianni	Greece	1:32.96
6	Pauline Gerard-Renissac	France	1:33.22
7	Anastasiia Makarenko	Ukraine	1:34.78
8	Gamila Aly Saber	Egypt	1:36.18
