= Slovakia at the 2022 World Games =

- IOC code: SVK
- NOC: Slovak Olympic and Sports Committee

in Birmingham, United States 7 July 2022 – 17 July 2022
- Competitors: 12 (5 men and 7 women) in 10 sports
- Medals Ranked 39th: Gold 1 Silver 1 Bronze 2 Total 4

World Games appearances (overview)
- 1981; 1985; 1989; 1993; 1997; 2001; 2005; 2009; 2013; 2017; 2022; 2025

Slovakia competed at the 2022 World Games held in Birmingham, United States from 7 to 17 July 2022. Athletes representing Slovakia won one gold medal, one silver medal and two bronze medals. The country finished in 39th place in the medal table.

== Medalists ==
Medal	Name	Sport	Event	Date
Gold	Monika Chochlíková	Muaythai	Women's 51 kg	17 July
Silver	Alexandra Filipová	Kickboxing	Women's 70 kg	14 July
Bronze	Zuzana Hrašková	Finswimming	Women's 100 m bi-fins	9 July
Bronze	Ingrida Suchánková	Karate	Women's kumite 61 kg	9 July

== Competitors ==
The following is the list of number of competitors in the Games.

Sport	Men	Women	Total
Air sports	1	0	1
Archery	1	1	2
Canoe marathon	1	0	1
Duathlon	0	1	1
Finswimming	0	1	1
Karate	0	1	1
Kickboxing	0	2	2
Muaythai	1	1	2
Powerlifting	0	1	1
Water skiing	1	0	1
Total	5	7 (Note: Monika Chochlíková competed in both kickboxing and muaythai.)	12

== Air sports ==
Slovakia competed in air sports.

== Archery ==
Slovakia competed in archery.

Athlete	Event	Ranking round		Round of 32	Round of 16	Quarterfinals	Semifinals	Final / BM	
Athlete	Event	Score	Rank	Opposition Result	Opposition Result	Opposition Result	Opposition Result	Opposition Result	Rank
Jozef Bošanský	Men's compound	709	5	Bye	(France) Gontier; W 147–146	(France) Boulch; L 145–147	did not advance		

Athlete	Event	Qualification		Elimination 1	Elimination 2	Elimination 3	Elimination 4	Semifinal	Final / BM	
Athlete	Event	Score	Rank	Opposition Result	Opposition Result	Opposition Result	Opposition Result	Opposition Result	Opposition Result	Rank
Denisa Baránková	Women's recurve	323	10	(Sweden) Jangnäs; W 86–75	(Netherlands) Schloesser; L 81–85	did not advance				

== Canoe marathon ==
Martin Nemček was scheduled to compete in canoe marathon. He did not start in both of his events.

== Duathlon ==
Slovakia competed in duathlon.

== Finswimming ==
Slovakia won one bronze medal in finswimming.

== Karate ==
Slovakia won one bronze medal in karate.

Women

Athlete	Event	Elimination round				Semifinal	Final / BM	
Athlete	Event	Opposition Result	Opposition Result	Opposition Result	Rank	Opposition Result	Opposition Result	Rank
Ingrida Suchánková	Women's kumite 61 kg	Jumaa (CAN); L 2–3	Grande (PER); W 6–5	Nilsson (SWE); W 4–2	1 Q	Serogina (UKR); L 2–3	Ali (EGY); W 3–1	3rd place, bronze medalist(s)

== Kickboxing ==
Slovakia won one silver medal in kickboxing.

== Muaythai ==
Slovakia won one gold medal in muaythai.

== Powerlifting ==
Slovakia competed in powerlifting.

Athlete	Event	Exercises			Total weight	Total points	Rank
Athlete	Event	Squat	Bench press	Deadlift	Total weight	Total points	Rank
Ivana Horna	Women's heavyweight	215.0	140.0	235.0	590.0	101.42	7

== Water skiing ==
Slovakia competed in water skiing.
