= Tunisia at the 2022 World Games =

- IOC code: TUN
- NOC: Tunisian Olympic Committee

in Birmingham, United States 7 July 2022 – 17 July 2022
- Competitors: 1 (1 woman) in 1 sport and 1 event
- Medals Ranked 70th: Gold 0 Silver 0 Bronze 1 Total 1

World Games appearances
- 1981; 1985; 1989; 1993; 1997; 2001; 2005; 2009; 2013; 2017; 2022; 2025

Tunisia competed at the 2022 World Games held in Birmingham, United States from 7 to 17 July 2022. One athlete represented Tunisia at the 2022 World Games. Karateka Chehinez Jemi won the bronze medal in her event and the country finished in 70th place in the medal table.

== Medalists ==
Medal	Name	Sport	Event	Date
Bronze	Chehinez Jemi	Karate	Women's kumite +68 kg	9 July

== Competitors ==
The following is the list of number of competitors in the Games.

Sport	Men	Women	Total
Karate	0	1	1
Total	0	1	1

== Karate ==
Tunisia won one bronze medal in karate.

Women

Athlete	Event	Elimination round				Semifinal	Final / BM	
Athlete	Event	Opposition Result	Opposition Result	Opposition Result	Rank	Opposition Result	Opposition Result	Rank
Chehinez Jemi	Women's kumite +68 kg	Chatziliadou (GRE); D 1–1	Okila (EGY); W 5–2	Keinänen (FIN); L 1–3	2 Q	Berultseva (KAZ); L 1–3	Keinänen (FIN); W 1–0	3rd place, bronze medalist(s)
