= Luxembourg at the 2022 World Games =

- IOC code: LUX
- NOC: Luxembourg Olympic and Sporting Committee

in Birmingham, United States 7 July 2022 – 17 July 2022
- Competitors: 1 (1 woman) in 1 sport and 1 event
- Medals: Gold 0 Silver 0 Bronze 0 Total 0

World Games appearances
- 1981; 1985; 1989; 1993; 1997; 2001; 2005; 2009; 2013; 2017; 2022; 2025

Luxembourg competed at the 2022 World Games held in Birmingham, United States from 7 to 17 July 2022.

== Competitors ==
The following is the list of number of competitors in the Games.

Sport	Men	Women	Total
Karate	0	1	1
Total	0	1	1

== Karate ==
Luxembourg competed in karate.

Athlete	Event	Elimination round				Semifinal	Final / BM	
Athlete	Event	Opposition Result	Opposition Result	Opposition Result	Rank	Opposition Result	Opposition Result	Rank
Jennifer Warling	Women's kumite 55 kg	Goranova (BUL); W 5–1	Kumizaki (BRA); W 1-0	Terliuga (UKR); L 1–4	2 Q	Youssef (EGY); L 0–0	Allen (USA); L 0–6	4
