= Water skiing at the 2022 World Games – Men's tricks =

Water skiing - Men's Tricks at the 2022 World Games
- Venue: Oak Mountain State Park, Birmingham, United States
- Dates: 14–15 July 2022
- Competitors: 11 from 11 nations

Medalists
gold medal	Adam Pickos	United States
silver medal	Danylo Filchenko	Ukraine
bronze medal	Pierre Ballon	France

The men's tricks competition in water skiing at the 2022 World Games took place from 14 to 15 July 2022 at the Oak Mountain State Park in Birmingham, United States.

== Competition format ==
A total of 11 athletes entered the competition. From qualifications the best 6 skiers qualify to final.

== Results ==
=== Qualifications ===
Rank	Athlete	Nation	Result	Note
1	Danylo Filchenko	Ukraine	11140	Q
2	Adam Pickos	United States	11040	Q
3	Martin Labra	Chile	10450	Q
4	Martin Kolman	Czech Republic	10330	Q
5	Olivier Fortamps	Belgium	9810	Q
6	Pierre Ballon	France	9750	Q
7	Josh Briant	Australia	9480	
8	Tobías Giorgis	Argentina	7970	
9	Tue Nielsen	Denmark	7740	
10	Patricio Font	Mexico	6720	
11	Nicholas Benatti	Italy	6700	

=== Final ===
Rank	Athlete	Nation	Result
1st place, gold medalist(s)	Adam Pickos	United States	11290
2nd place, silver medalist(s)	Danylo Filchenko	Ukraine	11140
3rd place, bronze medalist(s)	Pierre Ballon	France	10760
4	Martin Kolman	Czech Republic	10230
5	Olivier Fortamps	Belgium	9410
6	Martin Labra	Chile	7230
