= Peru at the 2022 World Games =

- IOC code: PER
- NOC: Peruvian Olympic Committee

in Birmingham, United States 7 July 2022 – 17 July 2022
- Competitors: 4 (3 men and 1 woman) in 4 sports and 4 events
- Medals Ranked 63rd: Gold 0 Silver 1 Bronze 0 Total 1

World Games appearances
- 1981; 1985; 1989; 1993; 1997; 2001; 2005; 2009; 2013; 2017; 2022; 2025

Peru competed at the 2022 World Games held in Birmingham, United States from 7 to 17 July 2022. Athletes representing Peru won one silver medal and the country finished in 63rd place in the medal table.

== Medalists ==
Medal	Name	Sport	Event	Date
Silver	Alexandra Grande	Karate	Women's kumite 61 kg	9 July

== Competitors ==
The following is the list of number of competitors in the Games.

Sport	Men	Women	Total
Cue sports	1	0	1
Karate	0	1	1
Muaythai	1	0	1
Squash	1	0	1
Total	3	1	4

== Cue sports ==
Peru competed in cue sports.

Athlete	Event	Round of 16	Quarterfinal	Semifinal	Final / BM	
Athlete	Event	Opposition Result	Opposition Result	Opposition Result	Opposition Result	Rank
Martinez Gerson	Men's nine-ball	Van Boening (USA); L 5–11	did not advance			

== Karate ==
Peru won one silver medal in karate.

Women

Athlete	Event	Elimination round				Semifinal	Final / BM	
Athlete	Event	Opposition Result	Opposition Result	Opposition Result	Rank	Opposition Result	Opposition Result	Rank
Alexandra Grande	Women's kumite 61 kg	Nilsson (SWE); W 3–2	Suchánková (SVK); L 5–6	Jumaa (CAN); W 4–4	2 Q	Ali (EGY); W 3–3	Serogina (UKR); L 2–3	2nd place, silver medalist(s)

== Muaythai ==
Peru competed in muaythai.

== Squash ==
Peru competed in squash.
