= Poland at the 2022 World Games =

- IOC code: POL
- NOC: Polish Olympic Committee
- Website: www.olimpijski.pl (in Polish)

in Birmingham, United States
- Competitors: 71 (34 men and 37 women) in 17 sports
- Medals Ranked 20th: Gold 3 Silver 5 Bronze 7 Total 15

World Games appearances
- 1981; 1985; 1989; 1993; 1997; 2001; 2005; 2009; 2013; 2017; 2022; 2025

Poland competed in the 2022 World Games in Birmingham, United States, from 7 to 17 July 2022. The games were originally scheduled for July 2021, but were postponed due to the rescheduling of the Tokyo 2020 Olympic Games. Athletes representing Poland won three gold medals, five silver medals and seven bronze medals. The country finished in 20th place in the medal table.

== Medalists ==
Medal	Name	Sport	Event	Date
Gold	Szymon Kropidłowski	Finswimming	Men's 50 m bi-fins	9 July
Gold	Agata Sitko	Powerlifting	Women's heavyweight	9 July
Gold	Kornelia Fiedkiewicz; Klaudia Naziębło; Paula Żukowska; Alicja Tchórz	Lifesaving	Women's 4 × 50 m obstacle relay	10 July
Silver	Szymon Kropidłowski	Finswimming	Men's 100 m bi-fins	8 July
Silver	Zuzanna Kula	Powerlifting	Women's lightweight	8 July
Silver	Paweł Laszczak	Air sports	Drone racing	10 July
Silver	Iwona Nieroda-Zdziebko	Kickboxing	Women's 52 kg	14 July
Silver	Natalia Kałucka	Sport climbing	Women's speed	July 14
Bronze	Aron Rozum	Sumo	Men's middleweight	9 July
Bronze	Magdalena Macios	Sumo	Women's lightweight	9 July
Bronze	Monika Skiba	Sumo	Women's middleweight	9 July
Bronze	Alicja Tchórz	Lifesaving	Women's 200 m obstacle	10 July
Bronze	Wojciech Kotowski; Adam Dubiel; Cezary Kępa; Hubert Nakielski	Lifesaving	Men's 4 × 25 m manikin carry relay	11 July
Bronze	Łukasz Radosz	Muaythai	Men's 91 kg	17 July
Bronze	Gabriela Kuzawińska	Muaythai	Women's 51 kg	17 July

== Competitors ==
The following is the list of number of competitors in the Games.

Sport	Men	Women	Total
Acrobatic gymnastics	0	2	2
Air sports	3	1	4
Archery	1	0	1
Billiards sports	2	1	3
Canoe marathon	1	1	2
Dancesport	7	9	16
Finswimming	1	1	2
Ju-jitsu	2	0	2
Kickboxing	0	1	1
Lifesaving	5	5	10
Muaythai	1	2	3
Orienteering	2	2	4
Powerlifting	2	3	5
Sport climbing	1	2	3
Squash	1	1	2
Sumo	5	5	10
Trampoline gymnastics	0	1	1
Total	34	37	71

Name	Gender	Date of birth	Sport
Agata Brychcy	Female	31 August 1993	Dancesport
Mateusz Brzozowski	Male	16 April 1997	Dancesport
Patrycja Chudziak	Female	2 July 1997	Sport climbing
Sebastian Dratwa	Male	5 December 1975	Air sports
Adam Dubiel	Male	12 December 1993	Lifesaving
Antonina Dudek	Female	15 December 2005	Finswimming
Marcin Dzieński	Male	22 January 1993	Sport climbing
Dominika Filec	Female	12 April 1998	Muaythai
Madara Freiberga	Female	6 February 1992	Dancesport
Mariusz Grotkowski	Male	4 November 1989	Powerlifting
Maria Hadjiraftis	Female	18 December 1991	Dancesport
Robert Henek	Male	29 July 1990	Ju-jitsu
Aleksandra Hornik	Female	17 December 1996	Orienteering
Anna Jaglińska-Sciamanna	Female	23 January 1991	Dancesport
Filip Jarota	Male	15 June 2001	Squash
Natalia Kałucka	Female	25 December 2001	Sport climbing
Cezary Kępa	Male	27 August 1996	Lifesaving
Wojciech Kotowski	Male	6 May 1994	Lifesaving
Antoni Kowalski	Male	9 February 2004	Billiards sports
Maciej Kozak	Male	11 February 1988	Ju-jitsu
Natalia Kręgiel	Female	1 March 2004	Dancesport
Szymon Kropidłowski	Male	10 December 2002	Finswimming
Zuzanna Kula	Female	20 April 1999	Powerlifting
Gabriela Kuzawińska	Female	26 March 1993	Muaythai
Bartłomiej Laszczak	Male	6 October 2003	Air sports
Paweł Laszczak	Male	3 March 2003	Air sports
Michał Luto	Male	18 February 1990	Sumo
Magdalena Macios	Female	28 May 1990	Sumo
Edgar Marcos Borjas	Male	9 January 1986	Dancesport
Alina Miklewska	Female	8 April 1984	Air sports
Marta Mozdyniewicz	Female	21 February 1997	Dancesport
Justyna Możdżonek	Female	9 November 1997	Dancesport
Dariusz Myćka	Male	7 January 1991	Dancesport
Hubert Nakielski	Male	21 March 2000	Lifesaving
Alina Nowak	Female	14 February 1989	Dancesport
Michał Olejnik	Male	22 January 1992	Orienteering
Paweł Ośmiałowski	Male	6 April 1977	Powerlifting
Piotr Paszewski	Male	16 April 1992	Dancesport
Bartosz Pawlak	Male	15 February 1990	Orienteering
Łukasz Przybylski	Male	24 April 1994	Archery
Łukasz Radosz	Male	8 June 1993	Muaythai
Aleksandra Rozum	Female	4 July 1998	Sumo
Aron Rozum	Male	17 April 1990	Sumo
Eros Sciamanna	Male	19 September 1988	Dancesport
Agata Sitko	Female	19 November 2002	Powerlifting
Sławomir Siwiec	Male	10 June 1992	Canoe marathon
Monika Skiba	Female	8 April 1988	Sumo
Magda Skrajnowska	Female	29 December 1998	Sumo
Paulina Starus	Female	8 February 1991	Dancesport
Patryk Swora	Male	24 April 1993	Sumo
Bartłomiej Szkutnik	Male	24 May 1992	Dancesport
Bartosz Szpulecki	Male	8 January 1993	Dancesport
Paulina Szymanel	Female	7 April 1995	Powerlifting
Karina Tyma	Female	5 May 2000	Squash
Hanna Wiśniewska	Female	12 March 1990	Orienteering
Anna Zagórska	Female	30 October 1997	Canoe marathon
Oliwia Zalewska	Female	20 January 1995	Billiards sports
Wiktor Zieliński	Male	11 January 2001	Billiards sports
Paula Żukowska	Female	30 March 1993	Lifesaving
Sandra Żurek	Female	5 May 2003	Trampoline gymnastics

== Acrobatic gymnastics ==
Poland competed in acrobatic gymnastics.

== Air sports ==
Poland won one silver medal in drone racing.

== Archery ==
Poland competed in archery.

== Cue sports ==
Poland competed in cue sports.

== Canoe marathon ==
Poland competed in canoe marathon.

== Dancesport ==
Poland competed in dancesport.

== Finswimming ==
Poland won two medals in finswimming.

== Ju-jitsu ==
Poland competed in ju-jitsu.

== Kickboxing ==
Poland won one silver medal in kickboxing.

== Lifesaving ==
Poland won three medals in lifesaving.

== Muaythai ==
Poland won two medals in muaythai.

== Orienteering ==
Poland competed in orienteering.

== Powerlifting ==
Poland won two medals in powerlifting.

== Sport climbing ==
Poland won one silver medal in sport climbing.

== Squash ==
Poland competed in squash.

== Sumo ==
Poland won three bronze medals in sumo.

Athlete	Event	Round of 64	Round of 32	Round of 16	Quarterfinals	Semifinals	Round of 32 Repechages	Round of 16 Repechages	Quarterfinals Repechages	Semifinals Repechages	Final / BM	
Athlete	Event	Opposition Score	Opposition Score	Opposition Score	Opposition Score	Opposition Score	Opposition Score	Opposition Score	Opposition Score	Opposition Score	Opposition Score	Rank
Michał Luto	Men's middleweight	—N/a		(Chinese Taipei) Huang Bo-chen; W	(Japan) Shion Fujisawa; L	—N/a		(Finland) Oskari Matti Riihioja; W	(United States) Jordan Karst; W	(Japan) Ryota Fukano; L	Did not advance	
Michał Luto	Men's openweight	—N/a	(United States) Eric Huynh; W	(Mongolia) Mendsaikhan Tsogt-Erdene; L	—N/a		(Ukraine) Vazha Daiauri; L	Did not advance				
Aron Rozum	Men's middleweight	—N/a		(United States) Andrew Roden; W	(Ukraine) Vazha Daiauri; L	—N/a			(Venezuela) Querys Perez; W	(Venezuela) Wlater Rivas; W	(Japan) Ryota Fukano; W	3rd place, bronze medalist(s)
Aron Rozum	Men's openweight	(Chinese Taipei) Huang Wei-Fan; W	(Egypt) Mohamed Elmahdy; W	(Ukraine) Oleksandr Veresiuk; L	—N/a		(United States) Andrew Roden; L	Did not advance				
Patryk Swora	Men's lightweight	—N/a		(Ukraine) Sviatoslav Semykras; L	—N/a			(Brazil) Alex Tetsushi Nakaya; W	(Ukraine) Anatolii Khliusin; L	Did not advance		
Patryk Swora	Men's openweight	—N/a	(Chinese Taipei) Huang Bo-chen; W	(Bulgaria) Pencho Dochev; W	(Japan) Daiki Nakamura; L	—N/a		(Ukraine) Sviatoslav Semykras; L	Did not advance			

== Trampoline gymnastics ==
Poland competed in trampoline gymnastics.
