= Hungary at the 2022 World Games =

- IOC code: HUN
- NOC: Hungarian Olympic Committee

in Birmingham, United States 7 July 2022 – 17 July 2022
- Competitors: 59 (28 men and 31 women) in 17 sports
- Medals Ranked 6th: Gold 11 Silver 7 Bronze 9 Total 27

World Games appearances
- 1981; 1985; 1989; 1993; 1997; 2001; 2005; 2009; 2013; 2017; 2022; 2025

Hungary competed at the 2022 World Games held in Birmingham, United States from 7 to 17 July 2022. Athletes representing Hungary won 11 gold medals, seven silver medals and nine bronze medals. The country finished in 6th place in the medal table.

== Medalists ==
Medal	Name	Sport	Event	Date
Gold	Alex Mozsár	Finswimming	Men's 400 m surface	8 July
Gold	Péter Holoda	Finswimming	Men's 100 m bi-fins	8 July
Gold	Petra Senánszky	Finswimming	Women's 50 m bi-fins	8 July
Gold	Petra Senánszky	Finswimming	Women's 100 m bi-fins	9 July
Gold	Szebasztián Szabó; Bence Gyárfás; Krisztián Takács; Gábor Balog	Lifesaving	Men's 4 × 50 m obstacle relay	10 July
Gold	Petra Senánszky; Fanni Gyurinovics; Zsuzsanna Jakabos; Evelyn Verrasztó	Lifesaving	Women's 4 × 50 m obstacle relay	10 July
Gold	Krisztián Takács; Gábor Balog; Szebasztián Szabó; Bence Gyárfás	Lifesaving	Men's 4 × 50 m medley relay	11 July
Gold	Balázs Farkas; Kata Hajdú; Zoltán Lőcsei; Anna Makranszki; Janka Ökrös; Vanessza Ruzicska; Zsófia Simon; Panna Szőllősi	Aerobic gymnastics	Dance	12 July
Gold	Vanda Kiszli	Canoe marathon	Women's short distance	11 July
Gold	Vanda Kiszli	Canoe marathon	Women's standard distance	12 July
Gold	Dániel Bali; Balázs Farkas; Fanni Mazács	Aerobic gymnastics	Trio	13 July
Silver	Yves Martial Tadissi	Karate	Men's kumite 67 kg	8 July
Silver	Alex Mozsár	Finswimming	Men's 200 m surface	9 July
Silver	Krisztina Varga	Finswimming	Women's 100 m bi-fins	9 July
Silver	Sára Suba; Petra Senánszky; Csilla Károlyi; Krisztina Varga	Finswimming	Women's 4x100 m surface relay	8 July
Silver	Zsuzsanna Jakabos; Panna Ugrai; Fanni Gyurinovics; Petra Senánszky	Lifesaving	Women's 4 × 50 m medley relay	11 July
Silver	Dániel Bali; Fanni Mazács	Aerobic gymnastics	Mixed pair	12 July
Silver	Balázs Farkas; Zoltán Lőcsei; Fanni Mazács; Panna Szőllősi; Dániel Bali	Aerobic gymnastics	Group	13 July
Bronze	Ádám Bukor	Finswimming	Men's 400 m surface	8 July
Bronze	Csilla Károlyi	Finswimming	Women's 200 m surface	8 July
Bronze	Krisztina Varga	Finswimming	Women's 50 m bi-fins	8 July
Bronze	Ádám Bukor	Finswimming	Men's 200 m surface	9 July
Bronze	Zsóka Csikós	Canoe marathon	Women's short distance	11 July
Bronze	Fanni Pigniczki	Rhythmic gymnastics	Ball	12 July
Bronze	Fanni Pigniczki	Rhythmic gymnastics	Hoop	12 July
Bronze	Norbert Speth	Muaythai	Men's 67 kg	17 July
Bronze	Ajsa Adel Sandorfi	Muaythai	Women's 60 kg	17 July

== Competitors ==
The following is the list of number of competitors in the Games.

Sport	Men	Women	Total
Aerobic gymnastics	3	7	10
Air sports	2	0	2
Archery	1	0	1
Canoe marathon	1	2	3
Dancesport	3	3	6
Finswimming	7	6	13
Ju-jitsu	0	1	1
Karate	2	0	2
Kickboxing	0	2	2
Lifesaving	5	5	10
Muaythai	1	1	2
Orienteering	0	1	1
Rhythmic gymnastics	—	1	1
Road speed skating Track speed skating	0	1	1
Squash	1	2	3
Sumo	2	0	2
Total	28	31 (Note: Petra Senánszky competed in both finswimming and lifesaving.)	59

== Aerobic gymnastics ==
Hungary won four medals in aerobic gymnastics.

== Air sports ==
Hungary competed in air sports and drone racing.

== Archery ==
Hungary competed in archery.

== Canoe marathon ==
Hungary won three medals in canoe marathon.

== Dancesport ==
Hungary competed in dancesport.

== Finswimming ==
Hungary won 11 medals in finswimming.

== Ju-jitsu ==
Hungary competed in ju-jitsu.

== Karate ==
Hungary won one silver medal in karate.

Men

Athlete	Event	Elimination round				Semifinal	Final / BM	
Athlete	Event	Opposition Result	Opposition Result	Opposition Result	Rank	Opposition Result	Opposition Result	Rank
Yves Martial Tadissi	Men's kumite 67 kg	Maresca (ITA); L 0–1	Hernandez (USA); W 1–0	Velozo (CHI); W 6–4	2 Q	Xenos (GRE); W 3–0	Figueira (BRA); L 0–4	2nd place, silver medalist(s)
Gábor Hárspataki	Men's kumite 75 kg	Hsu (TPE); W 5–1	Scott (USA); L 0–2	Otabolaev (UZB); L 2–2	3	Did not advance		5

== Kickboxing ==
Hungary competed in kickboxing.

== Lifesaving ==
Hungary won four medals in lifesaving.

== Muaythai ==
Hungary won two bronze medals in muaythai.

== Orienteering ==
Hungary competed in orienteering.

== Rhythmic gymnastics ==
Hungary won two bronze medals in rhythmic gymnastics.

== Road speed skating ==
Hungary competed in road speed skating.

== Squash ==
Hungary competed in squash.

== Sumo ==
Hungary competed in sumo.

== Track speed skating ==
Hungary competed in track speed skating.
