= Romania at the 2022 World Games =

- IOC code: ROU
- NOC: Romanian Olympic and Sports Committee

in Birmingham, United States 7 July 2022 – 17 July 2022
- Competitors: 21 (9 men and 12 women) in 6 sports
- Medals Ranked 57th: Gold 0 Silver 1 Bronze 2 Total 3

World Games appearances
- 1981; 1985; 1989; 1993; 1997; 2001; 2005; 2009; 2013; 2017; 2022; 2025

Romania competed at the 2022 World Games held in Birmingham, United States from 7 to 17 July 2022. Athletes representing Romania won one silver medal and two bronze medals. The country finished in 57th place in the medal table.

== Medalists ==
Medal	Name	Sport	Event	Date
Silver	Darius Branda; Sandra Dincă; Mirela Frîncu; Leonard Manta; Daria Mihaiu; Sarmiza Niculescu; Mihai Alin Popa; Antonio Surdu	Aerobic gymnastics	Dance	12 July
Bronze	Gabriel Bocșer; Leonard Manta; Mihai Alin Popa; Antonio Surdu; Daniel Țavoc	Aerobic gymnastics	Group	13 July
Bronze	Gabriel Bocșer; Miruna Iordache; Daniel Țavoc	Aerobic gymnastics	Trio	13 July

== Competitors ==
The following is the list of number of competitors in the Games:

Sport	Men	Women	Total
Aerobic gymnastics	6	5	11
Dancesport	2	2	4
Duathlon	0	2	2
Ju-jitsu	1	1	2
Kickboxing	0	1	1
Rhythmic gymnastics	—N/a	1	1
Total	9	12	21

== Aerobic gymnastics ==
Romania won three medals in aerobic gymnastics.

== Dancesport ==
Romania competed in dancesport.

== Duathlon ==
Romania competed in duathlon.

== Ju-jitsu ==
Romania competed in ju-jitsu.

== Kickboxing ==
Romania competed in kickboxing.

Athlete	Category	Quarterfinals	Semifinals	Final/Bronze medal bout	
Athlete	Category	Opposition Result	Opposition Result	Opposition Result	Rank
Andreea Cebuc	Women's 60 kg	Martyniuk (UKR); L 1–2	did not advance		

== Rhythmic gymnastics ==
Romania competed in rhythmic gymnastics.
