= Kickboxing at the 2022 World Games =

- Venue: Boutwell Auditorium
- Dates: 13–14 July 2022
- No. of events: 6

The kickboxing competition at the 2022 World Games took place in July 2022, in Birmingham in United States, at the Boutwell Auditorium. Originally scheduled to take place in July 2021, the Games were rescheduled for July 2022 as a result of the 2020 Summer Olympics postponement due to the COVID-19 pandemic. This was the first time, when kickboxing was an official discipline in The World Games programme (in 2017 was an invitational event). The competition was held on K1 rules.

== Participating nations ==
- Austria (1)
- Azerbaijan (1)
- Belgium (1)
- Bosnia and Herzegovina (1)
- Brazil (1)
- Bulgaria (1)
- Canada (1)
- Croatia (1)
- Czech Republic (1)
- Finland (3)
- Germany (1)
- Israel (2)
- Italy (2)
- Kazakhstan (1)
- Kyrgyzstan (1)
- Lithuania (1)
- Mexico (2)
- Montenegro (1)
- Netherlands (1)
- Poland (3)
- Portugal (2)
- Romania (1)
- Russia (3)
- Serbia (3)
- Slovakia (2)
- Slovenia (1)
- Ukraine (5)
- United States (3)
- Venezuela (1)

== Medal table ==
* Host nation (United States)

| Rank | Nation | Gold | Silver | Bronze | Total |
|---|---|---|---|---|---|
| 1 | Israel | 2 | 0 | 0 | 2 |
| 2 | Serbia | 1 | 1 | 0 | 2 |
| 3 | Austria | 1 | 0 | 0 | 1 |
| 3 | Azerbaijan | 1 | 0 | 0 | 1 |
| 3 | Mexico | 1 | 0 | 0 | 1 |
| 6 | Ukraine | 0 | 2 | 3 | 5 |
| 7 | Croatia | 0 | 1 | 0 | 1 |
| 7 | Poland | 0 | 1 | 0 | 1 |
| 7 | Slovakia | 0 | 1 | 0 | 1 |
| 10 | Czech Republic | 0 | 0 | 1 | 1 |
| 10 | Finland | 0 | 0 | 1 | 1 |
| 10 | Kyrgyzstan | 0 | 0 | 1 | 1 |
| Totals (12 entries) | | 6 | 6 | 6 | 18 |

== Events ==
=== Men ===
| Event | Gold | Silver | Bronze |
|---|---|---|---|
| 63.5 kg | Miguel Martínez; Mexico | Orfan Sananzade; Ukraine | Ikbol Fozilzhonov; Kyrgyzstan |
| 75 kg | Or Moshe; Israel | Vitalii Dubina; Ukraine | Petr Dvořáček; Czech Republic |
| +91 kg | Bahram Rajabzadeh; Azerbaijan | Anto Širić; Croatia | Roman Shcherbatiuk; Ukraine |

=== Women ===
| Event | Gold | Silver | Bronze |
|---|---|---|---|
| 52 kg | Shir Cohen; Israel | Iwona Nieroda-Zdziebko; Poland | Daryna Ivanova; Ukraine |
| 60 kg | Stella Hemetsberger; Austria | Milana Bjelogrlić; Serbia | Alina Martyniuk; Ukraine |
| 70 kg | Aleksandra Krstić; Serbia | Alexandra Filipová; Slovakia | Virve Vanhakoski; Finland |
