= Karate at the 2022 World Games – Women's kumite 61 kg =

Women's kumite 61 kg at the 2022 World Games
- Venue: Bill Battle Coliseum
- Location: Birmingham, United States
- Dates: 9 July
- Competitors: 8 from 8 nations

Medalists
gold medal	Anita Serogina	Ukraine
silver medal	Alexandra Grande	Peru
bronze medal	Ingrida Suchánková	Slovakia

The women's kumite 61 kg competition in karate at the 2022 World Games took place on 9 July 2022 at the Bill Battle Coliseum in Birmingham, United States.

== Results ==
=== Elimination round ===
==== Pool A ====
Pos	Athlete	B	W	D	L	Pts	Score	(Egypt)	(Ukraine)	(Netherlands)	(United States)
1	Dahab Ali (EGY)	3	2	1	0	5	13–3	—	2–1	2–2	9–0
2	Anita Serogina (UKR)	3	2	0	1	4	11–5	1–2	—	3–1	7–2
3	Lynn Snel (NED)	3	1	1	1	3	12–5	2–2	1–3	—	9–0
4	Christina Klinepeter (USA)	3	0	0	3	0	2–25	0–9	2–7	0–9	—

Source: Birmingham 2022

==== Pool B ====
Pos	Athlete	B	W	D	L	Pts	Score	(Slovakia)	(Peru)	(Canada)	(Sweden)
1	Ingrida Suchánková (SVK)	3	2	0	1	4	12–10	—	6–5	2–3	4–2
2	Alexandra Grande (PER)	3	2	0	1	4	12–12	5–6	—	4–4	3–2
3	Haya Jumaa (CAN)	3	2	0	1	4	9–6	3–2	4–4	—	2–0
4	Anna-Johanna Nilsson (SWE)	3	0	0	3	0	4–9	2–4	2–3	0–2	—

Source: Birmingham 2022

=== Finals ===
Semi-finals
Dahab Ali (EGY)	3
Alexandra Grande (PER)	3
Ingrida Suchánková (SVK)	2
Anita Serogina (UKR)	3

Gold medal bout
Alexandra Grande (PER)	2
Anita Serogina (UKR)	3
Bronze medal bout
Dahab Ali (EGY)	1
Ingrida Suchánková (SVK)	3
