= Artistic roller skating at the 2022 World Games =

- Venue: Birmingham CrossPlex
- Dates: 16–17 July 2022
- No. of events: 3

The artistic roller skating competition at the 2022 World Games took place in July 2022, in Birmingham in United States, at the Birmingham CrossPlex. Originally scheduled to take place in July 2021, the Games were rescheduled for July 2022 as a result of the 2020 Summer Olympics postponement due to the COVID-19 pandemic.

== Medal table ==
* Host nation (United States)

| Rank | Nation | Gold | Silver | Bronze | Total |
|---|---|---|---|---|---|
| 1 | Spain | 1 | 2 | 0 | 3 |
| 2 | Italy | 1 | 1 | 1 | 3 |
| 3 | Portugal | 1 | 0 | 0 | 1 |
| 4 | Colombia | 0 | 0 | 1 | 1 |
| 4 | Germany | 0 | 0 | 1 | 1 |
| Totals (5 entries) | | 3 | 3 | 3 | 9 |

== Medalists ==
| Event | Gold | Silver | Bronze |
|---|---|---|---|
| Men's freeskating | Pau Garcia; Spain | Alessandro Liberatore; Italy | Tim Niclas Schubert; Germany |
| Women's freeskating | Rebecca Tarlazi; Italy | Andrea Silva; Spain | Carla Escrich; Spain |
| Couple dance | Portugal; Ana Luisa Monteiro; Pedro Monteiro | Italy; Asya Sofia Testoni; Giovanni Piccolantonio | Colombia; Brayan Carreño; Daniela Gerena |
