= Jordan at the 2022 World Games =

- IOC code: JOR
- NOC: Jordan Olympic Committee

in Birmingham, United States 7 July 2022 – 17 July 2022
- Competitors: 2 (2 men) in 2 sports
- Medals: Gold 0 Silver 0 Bronze 0 Total 0

World Games appearances
- 1981; 1985; 1989; 1993; 1997; 2001; 2005; 2009; 2013; 2017; 2022; 2025

Jordan competed at the 2022 World Games in Birmingham, Alabama, United States from 7 July to 17 July 2022.

== Competitors ==
Two athletes from Jordan qualified for the Games.

| Sport | Men | Women | Total |
|---|---|---|---|
| Ju-jitsu | 1 | 0 | 1 |
| Muaythai | 1 | 0 | 1 |
| Total | 2 | 0 | 2 |

== Ju-jitsu ==
Bader Al-Kuzai competed in the men's ne-waza 85 kg event.

== Muaythai ==
Saif Zakzook competed in the men's 57 kg event.
