= Mongolia at the 2022 World Games =

- IOC code: MGL
- NOC: Mongolian National Olympic Committee

in Birmingham, United States 7 July 2022 – 17 July 2022
- Competitors: 7 (4 men and 3 women) in 2 sports
- Medals Ranked 63rd: Gold 0 Silver 1 Bronze 0 Total 1

World Games appearances
- 1981; 1985; 1989; 1993; 1997; 2001; 2005; 2009; 2013; 2017; 2022

Mongolia competed at the 2022 World Games held in Birmingham, United States from 7 to 17 July 2022. Athletes representing Mongolia won one silver medal and the country finished in 63rd place in the medal table.

== Medalists ==
Medal	Name	Sport	Event	Date
Silver	Baasandorjiin Badral	Sumo	Men's openweight	9 July

== Competitors ==
The following is the list of number of competitors in the Games.

Sport	Men	Women	Total
Powerlifting	1	0	1
Sumo	3	3	6
Total	4	3	7

== Powerlifting ==
Mongolia competed in powerlifting.

Athlete	Event	Exercises			Total weight	Total points	Rank
Athlete	Event	Squat	Bench press	Deadlift	Total weight	Total points	Rank
Tumenjargal Dashzegve	Men's heavyweight	340.0	310.0	270.0	920.0	94.51	10

== Sumo ==
Mongolia won one silver medal in sumo.
