= Sumo at the 2022 World Games =

- Venue: Boutwell Auditorium; Birmingham, United States
- Dates: 9–10 July
- No. of events: 8

The sumo competition at the 2022 World Games took place in July 2022, in Birmingham in United States, at the Boutwell Auditorium; the lightweight, middleweight, and heavyweight events were held on July 9 and the openweight events were held on July 10.

Originally scheduled to take place in July 2021, the Games were rescheduled for July 2022 as a result of the 2020 Summer Olympics postponement due to the COVID-19 pandemic.

The Egyptian sumo team was banned from competing in the remaining sumo events after "poor sportsmanship". The poor organization and sportsmanship displayed during this year's competition led to sumo being dropped from the program ahead of the 2025 World Games.

== Medal table ==
Rank	Nation	Gold	Silver	Bronze	Total
1	Japan	4	4	1	9
2	Ukraine	3	3	3	9
3	Egypt	1	0	0	1
4	Mongolia	0	1	0	1
5	Poland	0	0	3	3
6	Brazil	0	0	1	1
Totals (6 entries)		8	8	8	24

== Medalists ==
=== Men ===
Event	Gold	Silver	Bronze
Lightweight	Abdelrahman El-Sefy; Egypt	Demid Karachenko; Ukraine	Sviatoslav Semykras; Ukraine
Middleweight	Vazha Daiauri; Ukraine	Shion Fujisawa; Japan	Aron Rozum; Poland
Heavyweight	Hidetora Hanada; Japan	Daiki Nakamura; Japan	Rui Júnior; Brazil
Openweight	Daiki Nakamura; Japan	Baasandorjiin Badral; Mongolia	Oleksandr Veresiuk; Ukraine

=== Women ===
Event	Gold	Silver	Bronze
Lightweight	Yuka Okutomi; Japan	Miku Yamanaka; Japan	Magdalena Macios; Poland
Middleweight	Sakura Ishii; Japan	Karyna Kolesnik; Ukraine	Monika Skibra; Poland
Heavyweight	Svitlana Yaromka; Ukraine	Ivanna Berezovska; Ukraine	Airi Hisano; Japan
Openweight	Ivanna Berezovska; Ukraine	Hiyori Kon; Japan	Svitlana Yaromka; Ukraine

== See also ==
- Sumo at the World Games
