= Aerobic gymnastics at the 2022 World Games =

- Venue: University of Alabama Birmingham
- Dates: 12–13 July
- No. of events: 4
- Competitors: 81 from 11 nations

The aerobic gymnastics competition at the 2022 World Games took place in July 2022, in Birmingham in United States, at the University of Alabama Birmingham. Originally scheduled to take place in July 2021, the Games have been rescheduled for July 2022 as a result of the 2020 Summer Olympics postponement due to the COVID-19 pandemic.

== Medal table ==
Rank	Nation	Gold	Silver	Bronze	Total
1	Hungary	2	2	0	4
2	Italy	1	1	0	2
3	Brazil	1	0	0	1
4	Romania	0	1	2	3
5	Azerbaijan	0	0	1	1
5	Bulgaria	0	0	1	1
Totals (6 entries)		4	4	4	12

== Events ==
Event	Gold	Silver	Bronze
Pairs	Brazil; Lucas Barbosa; Tamirez Silva	Hungary; Dániel Bali; Fanni Mazács	Bulgaria; Antonio Papazov; Anna Maria Stoilova
Dance	Hungary; Balázs Farkas; Kata Hajdú; Zoltán Lőcsei; Anna Makranszki; Janka Ökrös; Vanessza Ruzicska; Zsófia Simon; Panna Szőllősi	Romania; Darius Branda; Sandra Dincă; Mirela Frîncu; Leonard Manta; Daria Mihaiu; Sarmiza Niculescu; Mihai Alin Popa; Antonio Surdu	Azerbaijan; Vladimir Dolmatov; Madina Mustafayeva; Khadija Guliyeva; Rauf Hajiyev; Sanan Mahmudlu; Nigar Mir Jalalli; Nazrin Mustafayeva; Aykhan Ahmadli
Group	Italy; Sara Cutini; Matteo Falera; Davide Nacci; Marcello Patteri; Francesco Sebastio	Hungary; Balázs Farkas; Zoltán Lőcsei; Fanni Mazács; Panna Szőllősi; Dániel Bali	Romania; Gabriel Bocșer; Leonard Manta; Mihai Alin Popa; Antonio Surdu; Daniel Țavoc
Trio	Hungary; Dániel Bali; Balázs Farkas; Fanni Mazács	Italy; Sara Cutini; Davide Nacci; Francesco Sebastio	Romania; Gabriel Bocșer; Miruna Iordache; Daniel Țavoc
