= Sumo at the 2022 World Games – Women's heavyweight =

Sumo – Women's heavyweight at the 2022 World Games
- Venue: Boutwell Auditorium, Birmingham, United States
- Dates: 9 July 2022
- Competitors: 16 from 10 nations

Medalists
gold medal
silver medal
bronze medal

The women's heavyweight competition in sumo at the 2022 World Games took place on 9 July 2022 at the Boutwell Auditorium in Birmingham, United States.

== Competition format ==
A total of 16 athletes entered the competition. They fought in the cup system with repechages.

== Results ==
=== Main draw ===
Round of 16
(Ukraine) Svitlana Iaromka	W
(Japan) Airi Hisano
(Chinese Taipei) Yu Ting	W
(United States) Kellyann Au Ball
(Mongolia) Tuvshinjargal Bum-Erdene
(Ukraine) Viktoriia Tsaruk	W
(United States) Yaleidy Galindo	W
(Germany) Anika Schulze
(Ukraine) Ivanna Berezovska	W
(Brazil) Fernanda Pelegrini
(Chinese Taipei) Sun Pei-yu
(Venezuela) Esmeralda Cedeno	W
(Japan) Hiyori Kon	W
(Mongolia) Zoljargal Dagvadorj
(Thailand) Viparat Vituteerasan
(United States) Eros Armstrong	W

Quarter-finals
(Ukraine) Svitlana Iaromka	W
(Chinese Taipei) Yu Ting
(Ukraine) Viktoriia Tsaruk	W
(United States) Yaleidy Galindo
(Ukraine) Ivanna Berezovska	W
(Venezuela) Esmeralda Cedeno
(Japan) Hiyori Kon
(United States) Eros Armstrong	W

Semi-finals
(Ukraine) Svitlana Iaromka	W
(Ukraine) Viktoriia Tsaruk
(Ukraine) Ivanna Berezovska	W
(United States) Eros Armstrong

Final
(Ukraine) Svitlana Iaromka	W
(Ukraine) Ivanna Berezovska

=== Repechages ===
Round of 16 Repechage
(Chinese Taipei) Yu Ting
(Japan) Airi Hisano	W
(United States) Yaleidy Galindo
(Mongolia) Tuvshinjargal Bum-Erdene	W
(Venezuela) Esmeralda Cedeno	W
(Brazil) Fernanda Pelegrini
(Japan) Hiyori Kon
(Thailand) Viparat Vituteerasan	W

Quarter-finals repechage
(Japan) Airi Hisano	W
(Mongolia) Tuvshinjargal Bum-Erdene
(Venezuela) Esmeralda Cedeno	W
(Thailand) Viparat Vituteerasan

Semi-finals reprechage
(United States) Eros Armstrong
(Japan) Airi Hisano	W
(Venezuela) Esmeralda Cedeno	W
(Ukraine) Viktoriia Tsaruk

Bronze medal contest
(Japan) Airi Hisano	W
(Venezuela) Esmeralda Cedeno
