= North Macedonia at the 2022 World Games =

- IOC code: MKD
- NOC: Olympic Committee of North Macedonia

in Birmingham, United States 7 July 2022 – 17 July 2022
- Competitors: 2 (2 men) in 2 sports
- Medals: Gold 0 Silver 0 Bronze 0 Total 0

World Games appearances
- 1981; 1985; 1989; 1993; 1997; 2001; 2005; 2009; 2013; 2017; 2022; 2025

North Macedonia competed at the 2022 World Games in Birmingham, Alabama, United States from 7 July to 17 July 2022.

== Competitors ==
Two athletes from North Macedonia qualified for the Games.

Sport	Men	Women	Total
Air sports	1	0	1
Karate	1	0	1
Total	2	0	2

== Air sports ==
Bojan Nikov competed in drone racing, where he placed 22nd overall out of 31 athletes.

== Karate ==
Emil Pavlov competed in the men's kumite 67 kg event. He placed fourth in his group and did not advance to the bracket.
