= Egypt at the 2022 World Games =

- IOC code: EGY
- NOC: Egyptian Olympic Committee

in Birmingham, United States 7 July 2022 – 17 July 2022
- Competitors: 21 (14 men and 7 women) in 8 sports
- Medals Ranked 22nd: Gold 3 Silver 2 Bronze 1 Total 6

World Games appearances
- 1981; 1985; 1989; 1993; 1997; 2001; 2005; 2009; 2013; 2017; 2022; 2025

Egypt competed at the 2022 World Games held in Birmingham, United States from 7 to 17 July 2022. Athletes representing Egypt won three gold medals, two silver medals and one bronze medal. The country finished in 22nd place in the medal table. Most medals were won in karate.

== Medalists ==
Medal	Name	Sport	Event	Date
Gold	Abdalla Abdelaziz	Karate	Men's kumite 75 kg	9 July
Gold	Youssef Badawy	Karate	Men's kumite 84 kg	9 July
Gold	Abdelrahman El-Sefy	Sumo	Men's lightweight	9 July
Silver	Ahlam Youssef	Karate	Women's kumite 55 kg	8 July
Silver	Abdelrahman Shahin	Cue sports	Men's snooker	17 July
Bronze	Taha Tarek	Karate	Men's kumite +84 kg	9 July

== Competitors ==
The following is the list of number of competitors in the Games.

Sport	Men	Women	Total
Aerobic gymnastics	1	1	2
Cue sports	2	0	2
Finswimming	1	1	2
Karate	3	4	7
Orienteering	0	1	1
Powerlifting	1	0	1
Sumo	5	0	5
Wushu	1	0	1
Total	14	7	21

== Aerobic gymnastics ==
Egypt competed in aerobic gymnastics.

== Cue sports ==
Egypt won one silver medal in cue sports.

== Finswimming ==
Egypt competed in finswimming.

== Karate ==
Egypt won four medals in karate.

Men

Athlete	Event	Elimination round				Semifinal	Final / BM	
Athlete	Event	Opposition Result	Opposition Result	Opposition Result	Rank	Opposition Result	Opposition Result	Rank
Abdalla Abdelaziz	Men's kumite 75 kg	Horuna (UKR); L 5–6	Azhikanov (KAZ); W 5–3	Mahauden (BEL); W 12–4	2 Q	Scott (USA); W 10–5	Horuna (UKR); W 6–3	1st place, gold medalist(s)
Youssef Badawy	Men's kumite 84 kg	—N/a	Ech-chaabi (MAR); W 5–0	Timmermans (NED); W 1–0	1 Q	Kvesić (CRO); W 4–4	Ech-chaabi (MAR); W 6–6	1st place, gold medalist(s)
Taha Tarek	Men's kumite +84 kg	Irr (USA); W 5–4	Kvesić (CRO); L 3–5	Daniel (AUS); W 4–1	2 Q	Seck (ESP); L 1–1	Talibov (UKR); W 2–0	3rd place, bronze medalist(s)

Women

Athlete	Event	Elimination round				Semifinal	Final / BM	
Athlete	Event	Opposition Result	Opposition Result	Opposition Result	Rank	Opposition Result	Opposition Result	Rank
Aya Hesham	Women's kata	Ono (JPN); L 24.28–25.46	Lau (HKG); L 24.54–24.68	Kokumai (USA); L 24.38–24.40	4	Did not advance		6
Ahlam Youssef	Women's kumite 55 kg	Messerschmidt (GER); W 6–2	Campbell (CAN); W 9–1	Allen (USA); D 0–0	1 Q	Warling (LUX); W 0–0	Terliuga (UKR); L 0–1	2nd place, silver medalist(s)
Dahab Ali	Women's kumite 61 kg	Snel (NED); D 2–2	Serogina (UKR); W 2–1	Klinepeter (USA); W 9–0	1 Q	Grande (PER); L 3–3	Suchánková (SVK); L 1–3	4
Menna Shaaban Okila	Women's kumite +68 kg	Keinanen (FIN); L 0–1	Jemi (TUN); L 2–5	Chatziliadou (GRE); L 1–3	4	Did not advance		7

== Orienteering ==
Egypt competed in orienteering.

Athlete	Event	Time	Rank
Salma Abo Khaber	Women's sprint	27:42.00	36
Salma Abo Khaber	Women's middle distance	DNF	

== Powerlifting ==
Egypt competed in powerlifting.

Athlete	Event	Exercises			Total weight	Total points	Rank
Athlete	Event	Squat	Bench press	Deadlift	Total weight	Total points	Rank
Ahmed Hassanin	Men's super heavyweight	482.5	332.5	300.0	1115.0	95.08	10

== Sumo ==
Egypt won one gold medal in sumo. The sumo team was banned from competing in the remaining sumo events after "poor sportsmanship".

== Wushu ==
Egypt competed in wushu.
