= Sumo at the 2022 World Games – Men's middleweight =

Sumo – Men's middleweight at the 2017 World Games
- Venue: Boutwell Auditorium, Birmingham, United States
- Dates: 9 July 2022
- Competitors: 13 from 9 nations

Medalists
gold medal
silver medal
bronze medal

The men's middleweight competition in sumo at the 2022 World Games took place on 9 July 2022 at the Boutwell Auditorium in Birmingham, United States.

== Competition format ==
A total of 13 athletes entered the competition. They fought in the cup system with repechages.

== Results ==
=== Main draw ===
Round of 16
(United States) Andrew Roden
(Poland) Aron Rozum	W
(United States) Eric Huynh
(Venezuela) Querys Perez	W
(United States) Jordan Karst
(Venezuela) Wlater Rivas	W
(Poland) Michał Luto	W
(Chinese Taipei) Huang Bo-chen
(Japan) Shion Fujisawa	W
(Finland) Oskari Matti Riihioja

Quarter-finals
(Ukraine) Vazha Daiauri	W
(Poland) Aron Rozum
(Japan) Ryota Fukano	W
(Venezuela) Querys Perez
(Mongolia) Badral Baasandorj
(Venezuela) Wlater Rivas	W
(Poland) Michał Luto
(Japan) Shion Fujisawa	W

Semi-finals
(Ukraine) Vazha Daiauri
(Japan) Ryota Fukano
(Venezuela) Wlater Rivas
(Japan) Shion Fujisawa

Final

=== Repechages ===
Round of 16 Repechage
(Mongolia) Badral Baasandorj
(United States) Jordan Karst	W
(Poland) Michał Luto	W
(Finland) Oskari Matti Riihioja

Quarter-finals repechage
(Poland) Aron Rozum	W
(Venezuela) Querys Perez
(United States) Jordan Karst
(Poland) Michał Luto	W

Semi-finals reprechage
(Poland) Aron Rozum
(Poland) Michał Luto

Bronze medal contest
