= Sumo at the 2022 World Games – Women's middleweight =

Sumo – Women's middleweight at the 2022 World Games
- Venue: Boutwell Auditorium, Birmingham, United States
- Dates: 9 July 2022
- Competitors: 16 from 9 nations

Medalists
gold medal	(Japan) Sakura Ishii
silver medal	(Ukraine) Karyna Kolesnik
bronze medal	(Poland) Monika Skiba

The women's middleweight competition in sumo at the 2022 World Games took place on 9 July 2022 at the Boutwell Auditorium in Birmingham, United States.

== Competition format ==
A total of 16 athletes entered the competition. They fought in the cup system with repechages.

== Results ==
=== Main draw ===
Round of 16
(Ukraine) Maryna Maksymenko	W
(Poland) Monika Skiba
(Brazil) Valeria Dall Olio
(Norway) Pernille Rojahn Oddlien	W
(Japan) Sakura Ishii	W
(United States) Helen Delpopolo
(Germany) Daniela Schmidtsdorf
(Thailand) Kamonchanok Amnuaypol	W
(Ukraine) Karyna Kolesnik	W
(United States) Jenni Crook
(Germany) Kerstin Schmidtsdorf
(Japan) Nagisa Matsumoto	W
(Poland) Magda Skrajnowska	W
(United States) Christina Griffin-Jones
(Venezuela) Johana Garrido
(Japan) Asano Ota	W

Quarter-finals
(Ukraine) Maryna Maksymenko	W
(Norway) Pernille Rojahn Oddlien
(Japan) Sakura Ishii	W
(Thailand) Kamonchanok Amnuaypol
(Ukraine) Karyna Kolesnik	W
(Japan) Nagisa Matsumoto
(Poland) Magda Skrajnowska
(Japan) Asano Ota	W

Semi-finals
(Ukraine) Maryna Maksymenko
(Japan) Sakura Ishii	W
(Ukraine) Karyna Kolesnik	W
(Japan) Asano Ota

Final
(Japan) Sakura Ishii	W
(Ukraine) Karyna Kolesnik

=== Repechages ===
Round of 16 Repechage
(Norway) Pernille Rojahn Oddlien
(Poland) Monika Skiba	W
(Thailand) Kamonchanok Amnuaypol	W
(United States) Helen Delpopolo
(Japan) Nagisa Matsumoto	W
(United States) Jenni Crook
(Poland) Magda Skrajnowska	W
(Venezuela) Johana Garrido

Quarter-finals repechage
(Poland) Monika Skiba	W
(Thailand) Kamonchanok Amnuaypol
(Japan) Nagisa Matsumoto	W
(Poland) Magda Skrajnowska

Semi-finals reprechage
(Japan) Asano Ota
(Poland) Monika Skiba	W
(Ukraine) Maryna Maksymenko
(Japan) Nagisa Matsumoto	W

Bronze medal contest
(Poland) Monika Skiba	W
(Japan) Nagisa Matsumoto
