= Israel at the 2022 World Games =

- IOC code: ISR
- NOC: Olympic Committee of Israel

in Birmingham, United States 7 July 2022 – 17 July 2022
- Competitors: 51 (26 men and 25 women) in 10 sports
- Medals Ranked 11th: Gold 7 Silver 3 Bronze 4 Total 14

World Games appearances
- 2005; 2009; 2013; 2017; 2022; 2025

Israel competed at the 2022 World Games held in Birmingham, United States from 7 to 17 July 2022. Israeli athletes participated in ten sports, winning seven gold, three silver and four bronze medals, and attaining eleventh place overall at the Games, in its best showing to date.

== Medalists ==
Israeli athletes won seven gold medals and placed eleventh overall in number of gold medals. Israeli athletes also won three silvers and four bronze medals. Israel finished in eleventh place overall in the Games, in its best showing to date.

Medal	Name	Sport	Event	Date
Gold	Daria Atamanov	Rhythmic gymnastics	Ball	12 July
Gold	Daria Atamanov	Rhythmic gymnastics	Ribbon	13 July
Gold	Or Moshe	Kickboxing	Men's 75 kg	14 July
Gold	Nimrod Ryeder	Ju-jitsu	Men's ne-waza 77 kg	15 July
Gold	Shir Cohen	Kickboxing	Women's 52 kg	14 July
Gold	Meshy Rosenfeld	Ju-jitsu	Women's ne-waza 57 kg	15 July
Gold	Meshy Rosenfeld	Ju-jitsu	Women's ne-waza open	16 July
Silver	Daria Atamanov	Rhythmic gymnastics	Clubs	13 July
Silver	Rony Nisimian	Ju-jitsu	Women's ne-waza 63 kg	15 July
Silver	Nili Block	Muaythai	Women's 60 kg	17 July
Bronze	Viki Dabush	Ju-jitsu	Men's ne-waza 69 kg	15 July
Bronze	Saar Shemesh	Ju-jitsu	Men's ne-waza 85 kg	15 July
Bronze	Meron Weissman; Adi Horwitz	Acrobatic gymnastics	Mixed pair	15 July
Bronze	Saar Shemesh	Ju-jitsu	Men's ne-waza open	16 July

== Competitors ==
The following is the list of number of competitors in the Games.

Sport	Men	Women	Total
Acrobatic gymnastics	5	4	9
Dancesport	1	1	2
Ju-jitsu	3	2	5
Kickboxing	2	2	4
Lacrosse	12	12	24
Muaythai	1	1	2
Rhythmic gymnastics	—N/a	1	1
Sport climbing	1	1	2
Water skiing	1	0	1
Wushu	0	1	1
Total	26	25	51

== Acrobatic gymnastics ==
Israel competed in acrobatic gymnastics; Meron Weissman and Adi Horwitz won the bronze medal for Mixed Pair.

== Dancesport ==
Israel competed in dancesport.

== Ju-jitsu ==
Israel won seven medals in ju-jitsu; Meshy Rosenfeld winning two gold medals in the Women's ne-waza 57 kg and Women's ne-waza open categories. and Nimrod Ryeder winning gold for Men's ne-waza 77 kg. Rony Nisimian won the silver medal in the Women's ne-waza 63 kg category. Saar Shemesh won two bronze medals, in the Men's ne-waza 85 kg and the Men's ne-waza open categories, while Viki Dabush won a bronze medal in the Men's ne-waza 69 kg category.

== Kickboxing ==
Israel won two gold medals in kickboxing; Or Moshe winning in the Men's 75 kg and Shir Cohen in the Women's 52 kg categories.

== Lacrosse ==
Israel competed in both the men's and women's lacrosse tournaments.

== Muaythai ==
Israel competed in Muaythai; Nili Block won the silver medal in the Women's 60 kg category.

== Rhythmic gymnastics ==
Israel competed in rhythmic gymnastics; Daria Atamanov winning two gold medals, in the Balls and Ribbon categories, and the silver medal in Clubs.

== Sport climbing ==
Israel competed in sport climbing.

== Water skiing ==
Israel competed in water skiing.

== Wushu ==
Israel competed in wushu.
