= Rhythmic gymnastics at the 2022 World Games =

- Venue: Sloss Furnaces
- Dates: 12–13 July 2022
- No. of events: 4

The rhythmic gymnastics competition at the 2022 World Games took place in July 2022, in Birmingham in United States, at the Legacy Arena.

Originally scheduled to take place in July 2021, the Games were rescheduled for July 2022 as a result of the 2020 Summer Olympics postponement due to the COVID-19 pandemic.

== Events ==
| Event | Gold | Silver | Bronze |
|---|---|---|---|
| Hoop | Boryana Kaleyn; Bulgaria | Sofia Raffaeli; Italy | Fanni Pigniczki; Hungary |
| Ball | Daria Atamanov; Israel | Sofia Raffaeli; Italy | Fanni Pigniczki; Hungary |
| Clubs | Sofia Raffaeli; Italy | Daria Atamanov; Israel | Ekaterina Vedeneeva; Slovenia |
| Ribbon | Daria Atamanov; Israel | Boryana Kaleyn; Bulgaria | Viktoriia Onopriienko; Ukraine |

== Medal table ==
* Host nation (United States)

| Rank | Nation | Gold | Silver | Bronze | Total |
|---|---|---|---|---|---|
| 1 | Israel | 2 | 1 | 0 | 3 |
| 2 | Italy | 1 | 2 | 0 | 3 |
| 3 | Bulgaria | 1 | 1 | 0 | 2 |
| 4 | Hungary | 0 | 0 | 2 | 2 |
| 5 | Slovenia | 0 | 0 | 1 | 1 |
| 5 | Ukraine | 0 | 0 | 1 | 1 |
| Totals (6 entries) | | 4 | 4 | 4 | 12 |
