= Sumo at the 2022 World Games – Men's lightweight =

Sumo – Men's Lightweight at the 2022 World Games
- Venue: Boutwell Auditorium, Birmingham, United States
- Dates: 9 July 2022
- Competitors: 16 from 11 nations

Medalists
gold medal	(Egypt) Abdelrahman Elsefy
silver medal	(Ukraine) Demid Karachenko
bronze medal	(Ukraine) Sviatoslav Semykras

The men's lightweight competition in sumo at the 2022 World Games took place on 9 July 2022 at the Boutwell Auditorium in Birmingham, United States.

== Competition format ==
A total of 16 athletes entered the competition. They fought in the cup system with repechages.

== Results ==
=== Main draw ===
Round of 16
(Norway) Kim Erik Svensson	W
(Chinese Taipei) Yao Lai-hsing
(Ukraine) Demid Karachenko	W
(United States) Justin Kizzart
(Bulgaria) Pencho Dochev	W
(Venezuela) Yorgen Cova
(United States) Justin Jones
(Hungary) Erik Szilagyi	W
(Poland) Patryk Swora
(Ukraine) Sviatoslav Semykras	W
(Chinese Taipei) Huang Wei-fan
(Brazil) Alex Tetsushi Nakaya	W
(Egypt) Abdelrahman Elsefy	W
(Mongolia) Zanabazar Bayarsaikhan
(United States) Trent Sabo
(Ukraine) Anatolii Khliusin	W

Quarter-finals
(Norway) Kim Erik Svensson
(Ukraine) Demid Karachenko	W
(Bulgaria) Pencho Dochev	W
(Hungary) Erik Szilagyi
(Ukraine) Sviatoslav Semykras	W
(Brazil) Alex Tetsushi Nakaya
(Egypt) Abdelrahman Elsefy	W
(Ukraine) Anatolii Khliusin

Semi-finals
(Ukraine) Demid Karachenko	W
(Bulgaria) Pencho Dochev
(Ukraine) Sviatoslav Semykras
(Egypt) Abdelrahman Elsefy	W

Final
(Ukraine) Demid Karachenko
(Egypt) Abdelrahman Elsefy	W

=== Repechages ===
Round of 16 Repechage
(Norway) Kim Erik Svensson	W
(United States) Justin Kizzart
(Hungary) Erik Szilagyi
(Venezuela) Yorgen Cova	W
(Brazil) Alex Tetsushi Nakaya
(Poland) Patryk Swora	W
(Ukraine) Anatolii Khliusin	W
(Mongolia) Zanabazar Bayarsaikhan

Quarter-finals repechage
(Norway) Kim Erik Svensson
(Venezuela) Yorgen Cova	W
(Poland) Patryk Swora
(Ukraine) Anatolii Khliusin	W

Semi-finals repechage
(Ukraine) Sviatoslav Semykras	W
(Venezuela) Yorgen Cova
(Ukraine) Anatolii Khliusin
(Bulgaria) Pencho Dochev	W

Bronze medal contest
(Ukraine) Sviatoslav Semykras	W
(Bulgaria) Pencho Dochev
