= Karate at the 2022 World Games – Qualification =

Karate at the 2022 World Games – Qualification This article details the qualifying phase for karate at the 2022 World Games. 96 quota places for the Games are entitled to the karatekas coming from their respective NOCs, based on the results at designated tournaments supervised by World Karate Federation. Each NOC could enter a maximum of eight karatekas (one in each division) of twelve event categories. Host nation United States of America has reserved a spot in each of all events.

== Qualifying System ==
The rule that a country can only have one competitor per category prevails throughout the qualification process.

=== First qualification ===
3 Place per Category: Gold, Silver and the Bronze medal winner of the Senior World Championships 2021 at Dubai

=== Second qualification ===
3 Place per Category: Three first positions in the World Karate Federation Ranking as per 1 March 2022.

=== Third qualification ===
1 Place per Category: The person from the host country United States of America with the highest World Ranking as per 1 March 2022.

=== Fourth qualification ===
1 Place per Category:The remaining total of 12 places are distributed by continental federation in the following sequence based on their World Ranking as per 1 March 2022.

- 2 Athletes from the OKF (1 Male and 1 Female)
- 2 Athletes from the UFAK (1 Male and 1 Female)
- 2 Athletes from the PKF (1 Male and 1 Female)
- 1 Athletes from the AKF (1 Male or 1 Female)
- 1 Athletes from the EKF (1 Male or 1 Female), If pick 4 is male the pick 5 must be female and vice versa
- 2 Athletes from the UFAK (1 Male and 1 Female), Cannot be from the same countries as pick 2
- 2 Athletes from the PKF (1 Male and 1 Female), Cannot be from the same countries as pick 3

== Qualification summary ==
The following table summarises the outcome of qualification for the Karate at the 2022 World Games. Following athletes gained at least one quota place for Birmingham.

NOC	Men						Women						Total
NOC	Kata	60 kg	67 kg	75 kg	-84 kg	+84	Kata	50 kg	55 kg	61 kg	68 kg	+68	Total
Algeria		Yes											1
Australia						Yes							1
Azerbaijan	Yes					Yes					Yes		3
Bulgaria									Yes				1
Brazil		Yes	Yes						Yes				3
Canada									Yes	Yes			2
China									Yes	Yes			2
Chile			Yes		Yes								2
Croatia					Yes								1
Egypt			Yes	Yes	Yes	Yes	Yes		Yes	Yes	Yes	Yes	9
France			Yes		Yes						Yes		2
Georgia						Yes							1
Germany						Yes		Yes					2
Hong Kong							Yes						1
Hungary			Yes	Yes									2
Iran				Yes	Yes	Yes						Yes	4
Italy	Yes	Yes		Yes		Yes	Yes				Yes	Yes	7
Japan	Yes						Yes	Yes					3
Kazakhstan		Yes		Yes				Yes				Yes	4
Kuwait		Yes											1
Morocco		Yes			Yes								2
New Zealand							Yes						1
North Macedonia			Yes										1
Panama	Yes												1
Peru										Yes			1
Philippines								Yes					1
Spain	Yes						Yes					Yes	3
Switzerland	Yes										Yes		2
Turkey	Yes	Yes	Yes		Yes		Yes	Yes	Yes	Yes		Yes	9
Ukraine				Yes				Yes	Yes	Yes	Yes		5
Serbia										Yes			1
Luxembourg									Yes				1
Tunisia												Yes	1
United States	Yes	Yes	Yes	Yes	Yes	Yes	Yes	Yes	Yes	Yes	Yes	Yes	12
Uzbekistan				Yes									1
Venezuela								Yes					1
Total: 36 NOCs	8	8	8	8	8	8	8	8	8	8	8	8	96

== Men's events ==
Male Kata
#	Name of Athlete	Country	Continent	Via
1	Ryo Kiyuna	JPN	AKF	World Championship
2	Damián Quintero	ESP	EKF	World Championship
3	Ali Sofuoğlu	TUR	EKF	World Championship
4	Gakuji Tozaki	USA	PKF	WKF Rank + Host
5	Mattia Busato	ITA	EKF	WKF Rank
6	Uki Ujihara	SUI	EKF	WKF Rank
7	Hector Cencion	PAN	PKF	Continental Representation
8	Roman Heydarov	AZE	EKF	Host - Sub.

Male Kumite -60 kg
#	Name of Athlete	Country	Continent	Via
1	Douglas Brose	BRA	PAK	World Championship
2	Angelo Crescenzo	ITA	EKF	World Championship
3	Abdel Ali Jina	MAR	UFAK	World Championship
4	Eray Şamdan	TUR	EKF	WKF Rank
5	Darkhan Assadilov	KAZ	AKF	WKF Rank
6	Abdullah Shaaban	KUW	AKF	WKF Rank - Sub.
7	Helassa Ayoub Anis	ALG	UFAK	Continental Representation
8	Frank Ruiz	USA	PKF	Host

Male Kumite -67 kg
#	Name of Athlete	Country	Continent	Via
1	Steven Da Costa	FRA	EKF	World Championship
2	Emil Pavlov	MKD	EKF	World Championship
3	Ali Elsawy	EGY	UFAK	World Championship
4	Yves Martial Tadissi	HUN	EKF	WKF Rank
5	Burak Uygur	TUR	EKF	WKF Rank
6	Vinicius Figueira	BRA	PKF	WKF Rank
7	Camilo Velozo	CHL	PKF	Continental Representation
8	Josue Hernandez	USA	PKF	Host

Male Kumite -75 kg
#	Name of Athlete	Country	Continent	Via
1	Dastonbek Otabolaev	UZB	AKF	World Championship
2	Abdalla Abdelaziz	EGY	UFAK	World Championship
3	Tom Scott	USA	PKF	World Championship + Host
4	Stanislav Horuna	UKR	EKF	WKF Rank
5	Luigi Busà	ITA	EKF	WKF Rank
6	Gábor Hárspataki	HUN	EKF	WKF Rank
7	Bahman Asgari	IRI	AKF	Continental Representation
8	Nurkanat Azhikanov	KAZ	AKF	Host - Sub.

Male Kumite -84 kg
#	Name of Athlete	Country	Continent	Via
1	Youssef Badawy	EGY	UFAK	World Championship
2	Fabián Huaiquimán	CHL	PKF	World Championship
3	Jessie Da Costa	FRA	EKF	World Championship
4	Zabihollah Pourshab	IRI	AKF	WKF Rank
5	Ugur Aktas	TUR	EKF	WKF Rank
6	Ivan Kvesic	CRO	EKF	WKF Rank
7	Nabil Ech Chaabi	MAR	UFAK	Continental Representation
8	Kamran Madani	USA	PKF	Host

Male Kumite +84 kg
#	Name of Athlete	Country	Continent	Via
1	Gogita Arkania	GEO	EKF	World Championship
2	Simone Marino	ITA	EKF	World Championship
3	Asiman Gurbanli	AZE	EKF	World Championship
4	Sajjad Ganjzadeh	IRI	AKF	WKF Rank
5	Jonathan Horne	GER	EKF	WKF Rank
6	Taha Tarek	EGY	UFAK	WKF Rank
7	Daniel Tielen	AUS	OKF	Continental Representation
8	Brian Irr	USA	PKF	Host

== Women's events ==
Female Kata
#	Name of Athlete	Country	Continent	Via
1	Sandra Sánchez	ESP	EKF	World Championship
2	Hikaru Ono	JPN	AKF	World Championship
3	Viviana Bottaro	ITA	EKF	World Championship
4	Sakura Kokumai	USA	PKF	WKF Rank + Host
5	Grace Lau	HKG	AKF	WKF Rank
6	Dilara Bozan	TUR	EKF	WKF Rank
7	Alexandrea Anacan	NZL	OKF	Continental Representation
8	Aya Hisham	EGY	UFAK	Host - Sub.

Female Kumite -50 kg
#	Name of Athlete	Country	Continent	Via
1	Miho Miyahara	JPN	AKF	World Championship
2	Shara Hubrich	GER	EKF	World Championship
3	Kateryna Kryva	UKR	EKF	World Championship
4	Serap Özçelik	TUR	EKF	WKF Rank
5	Moldir Zhangbyrbay	KAZ	AKF	WKF Rank
6	Junna Tsukii	PHL	AKF	WKF Rank
7	Yorgelis Salazar	VEN	PKF	Continental Representation
8	Eva Alexander	USA	PKF	Host

Female Kumite -55 kg
#	Name of Athlete	Country	Continent	Via
1	Ahlam Youssef	EGY	UFAK	World Championship
2	Trinity Allen	USA	PKF	World Championship + Host
3	Ivet Goranova	BUL	EKF	World Championship
4	Anzhelika Terliuga	UKR	EKF	WKF Rank
5	Valéria Kumizaki	BRA	PKF	WKF Rank
6	Tuba Yakan	TUR	EKF	WKF Rank
7	Kathryn Campbell	CAN	PKF	Continental Representation
8	Jennifer Warling	USA	PKF	Host

Female Kumite -61 kg
#	Name of Athlete	Country	Continent	Via
1	Jovana Preković	SRB	EKF	World Championship
2	Anita Serogina	UKR	EKF	World Championship
3	Alexandra Grande	PER	PKF	World Championship
4	Haya Jumaa	CAN	PKF	WKF Rank
5	Merve Çoban	TUR	EKF	WKF Rank
6	Yin Xiaoyan	CHN	AKF	WKF Rank
7	Giana Farouk	EGY	UFAK	Continental Representation
8	Sara Hostettler	USA	PKF	Host

Female Kumite -68 kg
#	Name of Athlete	Country	Continent	Via
1	Irina Zaretska	AZE	EKF	World Championship
2	Silvia Semeraro	ITA	EKF	World Championship
3	Alizée Agier	FRA	EKF	World Championship
4	Feryal Abdelaziz	EGY	UFAK	WKF Rank
5	Elena Quirici	SUI	EKF	WKF Rank
6	Gong Li	CHN	AKF	WKF Rank
7	Halyna Melnyk	UKR	EKF	Continental Representation
8	Skylar Lingl	USA	PKF	Host

Female Kumite +68 kg
#	Name of Athlete	Country	Continent	Via
1	María Torres	ESP	EKF	World Championship
2	Menna Shaaban Okila	EGY	UFAK	World Championship
3	Sofya Berultseva	KAZ	AKF	World Championship
4	Meltem Hocaoğlu	TUR	EKF	WKF Rank
5	Hamideh Abbasali	IRI	AKF	WKF Rank
6	Clio Ferracuti	ITA	EKF	WKF Rank
7	Chehinez Jemi	TUN	UFAK	Continental Representation
8	Cirrus Lingl	USA	PKF	Host
