= Youssef Badawy =

Egyptian karateka (born 2001)

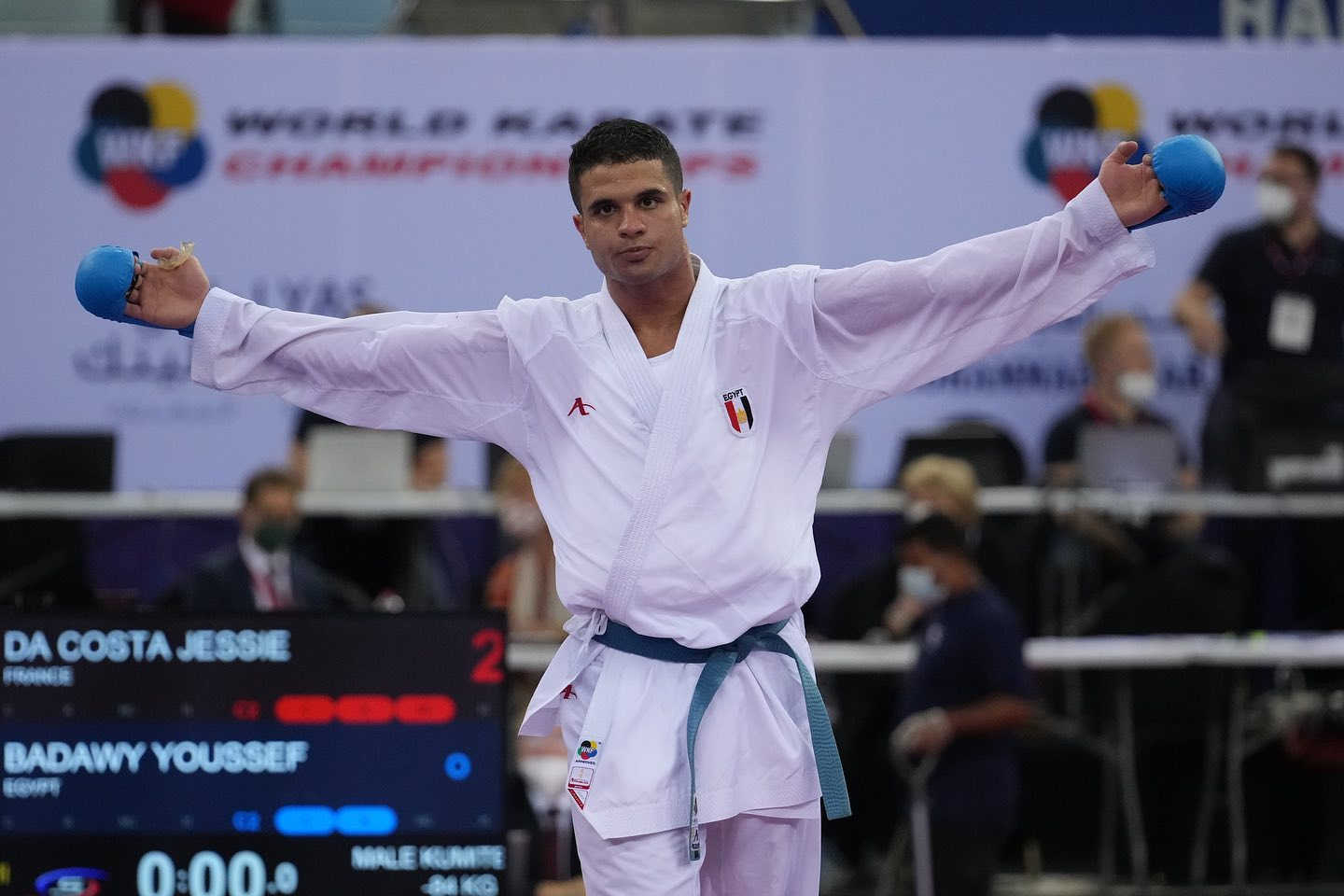
- End of 2021 World Karate Championships semi-final bout, declaring Badawy a finalist

Personal information
- Full name: Youssef Emad Mahmoud Abdelhameed Badawy
- Nickname: Golden Boy
- Born: 6 August 2001 (age 25) Cairo, Egypt
- Spouse: Emina Sipović (m. 2026)

Sport
- Country: Egypt
- Sport: Karate
- Weight class: -84 kg
- Event: Kumite
- Coached by: Raghed Saleh; Mohamed Abdelrahman (National Team coach)

Achievements and titles
- World finals: Gold medal in men's kumite 84 kg; Gold medal in 2023 World Karate Championships in Men's 84 kg
- Regional finals: Gold medal in African Championship Zone 1; Silver medal in 2020 UFAK Junior & Senior Championships in kumite team; Silver medal in 2021 UFAK Junior & Senior Championships in men's kumite 84 kg
- Highest world ranking: 1st
Medal record
Men's karate
Representing Egypt
World Games
Gold medal – first place	2022 Birmingham	Kumite 84 kg
World Championships
Gold medal – first place	2021 Dubai	Kumite 84 kg
Gold medal – first place	2023 Budapest	Kumite 84 kg
Gold medal – first place	2025 Cairo	Kumite 84 kg
Silver medal – second place	2023 Budapest	Team kumite
World Cup
Gold medal – first place	2024 Pamplona	Team kumite
African Games
Gold medal – first place	2024 Accra	Kumite 84 kg
Gold medal – first place	2023 Accra	Kumite 84 kg
Gold medal – first place	2023 Accra	Team kumite
Bronze medal – third place	2019 Rabat	Team kumite
Mediterranean Games
Gold medal – first place	2022 Oran	Kumite 84 kg
Bronze medal – third place	2026 Taranto	Kumite 84 kg
Junior, Cadet & U21 World Championship
Bronze medal – third place	2019 Chile	Kumite 84 kg
African Championship
Gold medal – first place	2023 Morocco	Kumite 84 kg
Gold medal – first place	2023 Morocco	Kumite Team
Gold medal – first place	2022 South Africa	Kumite 84 kg
Gold medal – first place	2022 South Africa	Kumite Team
Silver medal – second place	2021 Egypt	Kumite 84 kg
Gold medal – first place	2021 Egypt	Kumite Team
Silver medal – second place	2020 Morocco	Kumite Team
Gold medal – first place	2019 Morocco	Kumite +76 kg
Arab Championship
Bronze medal – third place	2021 Algeria	Kumite 84 kg
Gold medal – first place	2021 Algeria	Kumite Team
Karate1 Premier League
Gold medal – first place	2025 Cairo	Kumite 84 kg
Gold medal – first place	2025 Hangzhou	Kumite 84 kg
Gold medal – first place	2025 Paris	Kumite 84 kg
Silver medal – second place	2024 Cairo	Kumite 84 kg
Gold medal – first place	2024 Antalya	Kumite 84 kg
Bronze medal – third place	2024 Paris	Kumite 84 kg
Gold medal – first place	2022 Baku	Kumite 84 kg
Gold medal – first place	2022 Rabat	Kumite 84 kg
Gold medal – first place	2022 Fujairah	Kumite 84 kg
Gold medal – first place	2021 Moscow	Kumite 84 kg
Gold medal – first place	2021 Egypt	Kumite 84 kg
Karate1 Youth League
Gold medal – first place	2019 Cyprus	Kumite +76 kg

Youssef Badawy (Arabic: يوسف بدوي; born 6 August 2001) is an Egyptian karateka and a world-classed champion. He won the gold medal in the men's kumite 84 kg event at the 2021 World Karate Championships held in Dubai, United Arab Emirates. In 2019, he won the bronze medal in the men's kumite 84 kg event at the World Cadet, Junior & Under 21 Championships in Chile, marking his debut at the Worlds and introducing himself as a candidate for the World Champion title.

== Early life and experience ==
Inspired by his brother, who is also a kumite practitioner, Badawy took karate up at the age of five. He moved to Al Zohour Sporting Club and started making his way in the sport under his coach Mohamed Fathy by contending at the nationals. In 2015, he joined the Egyptian National Team. He made a start on participating internationally by enrolling in cadets’ kumite -63 kg event at Al-Ahli Dubai Open International Championship in 2016 and at The African Championship held in Algeria in 2018.

== Career ==
In February 2019, Badawy won his first continental gold medal at The African Championship in Marrakesh, Morocco. A month later, he contended at The Arab Championship for Clubs, winning the bronze medal in the kumite team event. During the same year in May, he won the gold medal in the men's kumite +76 kg event at the Karate1 Youth League held in Limassol, Cyprus, and, in August, he won the bronze medal in the men's team kumite at The African Games held in Rabat, Morocco. A few months later, he was ready to vie for a medal at the Junior, Cadet and U21 World Karate Championship held in Santiago, Chile, at which he claimed his first world bronze medal.

In February 2020, before COVID-19 outbreak, he won the silver medal in the men's team kumite event at the African Championship in Tangier, Morocco.

=== 2021 season ===
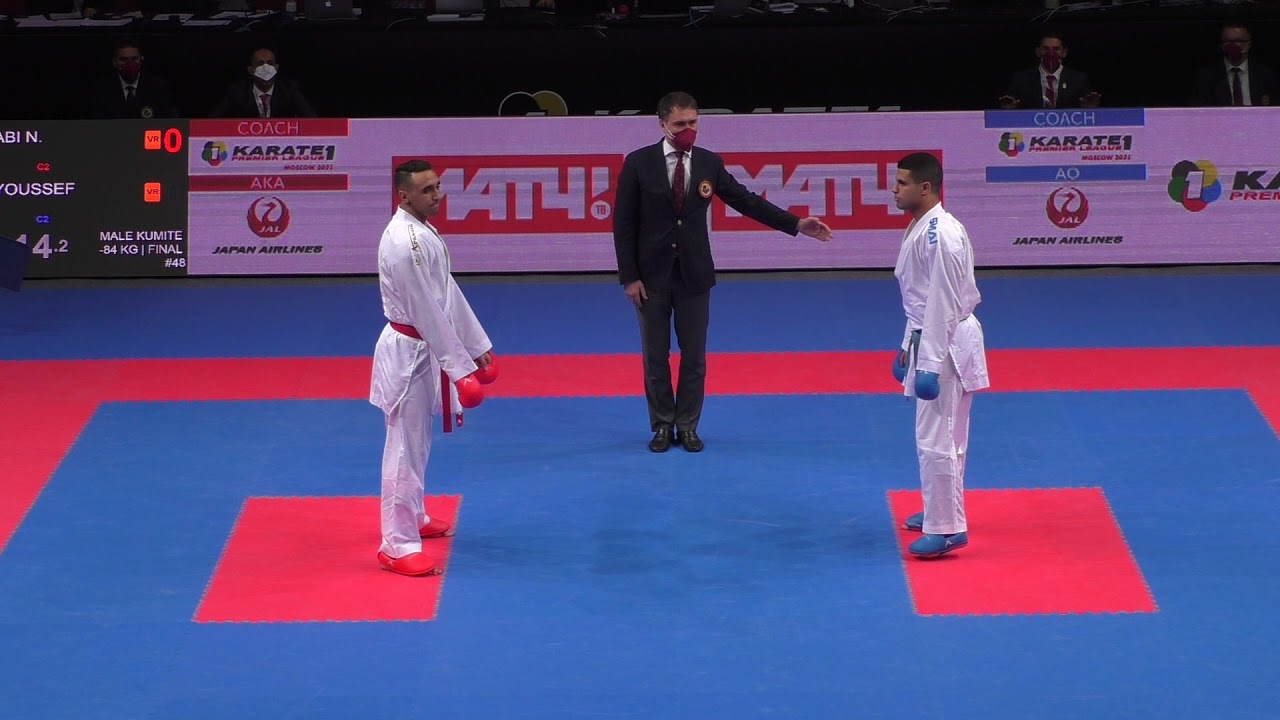
Badawy vs Nabil Ech-Chaabi at Moscow Karate1 Premier League final

In April 2021, after the hiatus foisted by the karate events suspension due to COVID, he made his first premier league participation for the season in Lisbon, Portugal. Badawy competed with Male Kumite -84 kg category's best bets and swept the two premier leagues held at the thick of the season. He made his senior debut in September at Egypt's Karate 1 Premier League with a gold medal, and at the premier league that followed in Moscow, he carried another gold medal back home after keeping a clean sheet throughout his five rounds. He promised on Instagram that it would not be the last gold medal.

==== World Karate Championship 2021 ====
Badawy was one of the youngest contenders in the tournament. He started off with a win against Ivan Kvesić, one-time 2018 world champion, and upstaged renowned karate pros. At the semi-final bout, Badawy bumped heads with Jessie Da Costa who outmatched with a single point almost till the end. Badawy's national team coach Mohamed Abdelrahman requested a VR at the 0:04 second which stalled the announcement of the bout end and provided Badawy with a final chance. Badawy signed off an emotive last-second Yuko to even the score 2-2 and win the bout by Senshu privilege.

===== "The awaited moment" =====
After an indecisive final between Badawy and Fabián Huaiquimán, the bout ended with a score tie 6-6 and the nullification of Badawy's Senshu. Badawy was proclaimed the winner by Hantei after a consensus among the five judges.

Badawy scoring his closing punch for the qualifying bout
Egypt
Bout	Contender	Nationality	Result
1st Bout	Ivan Kvesić	Croatia	5/4
2nd Bout	Othman Majeed Shvan	Iraq	10/0
3rd Bout	Diego Silva	Brazil	6/2
Quarter Final	Faraj Alnashri	Saudi Arabia	7/5
Semi Final	Jessie Da Costa	France	2/2
Final	Fabián Huaiquimán	Chile	6/6

He stated that it was an exacting win and attributed his achievement to his family.

"The moment that I have been dreaming of my entire life, which one can never express it; for it is an ineffable feeling. The moment at which one truly values everything he has sacrificed for, and at which every instant of fatigue, pain, frustration, loss, and despair flashes right before his eyes, making him perceive Allah’s blessing and forget how that all felt once. All the credit goes to my parents; the real heroes and the reason, after Allah, behind everything."

— Youssef Badawy on standing on the first-place podium of the World Championship.

==== Closing of season ====
He was entitled vice champion at the African Championship held in December in his hometown, Cairo, Egypt. No more than a week later, Badawy competed in Algeria at the Arab Championship, at which he won the bronze medal at the men's kumite 84 kg event, and the gold medal at the kumite team event.

Following after Dubai World Championship, in December, WKF announced the list of the first qualified athletes, which included Badawy the reigning world champion, for the Karate most anticipated event of the year: 2022 World Games which was held in July in Birmingham, United States. Following in January was Badawy's ascent to the top 5 athletes in the world ranking for the Male Kumite -84 kg category.

=== Golden Season ===
Badawy inaugurated his 2022 season medal count with a gold medal at the Fujairah Karate1 Premier League event after coming across his teammate, Mohamed Ramadan, at an all-Egypt final. In March, he went for playing for Al-Sharjah Sporting Club and placed first at the national Karate General League held in UAE.

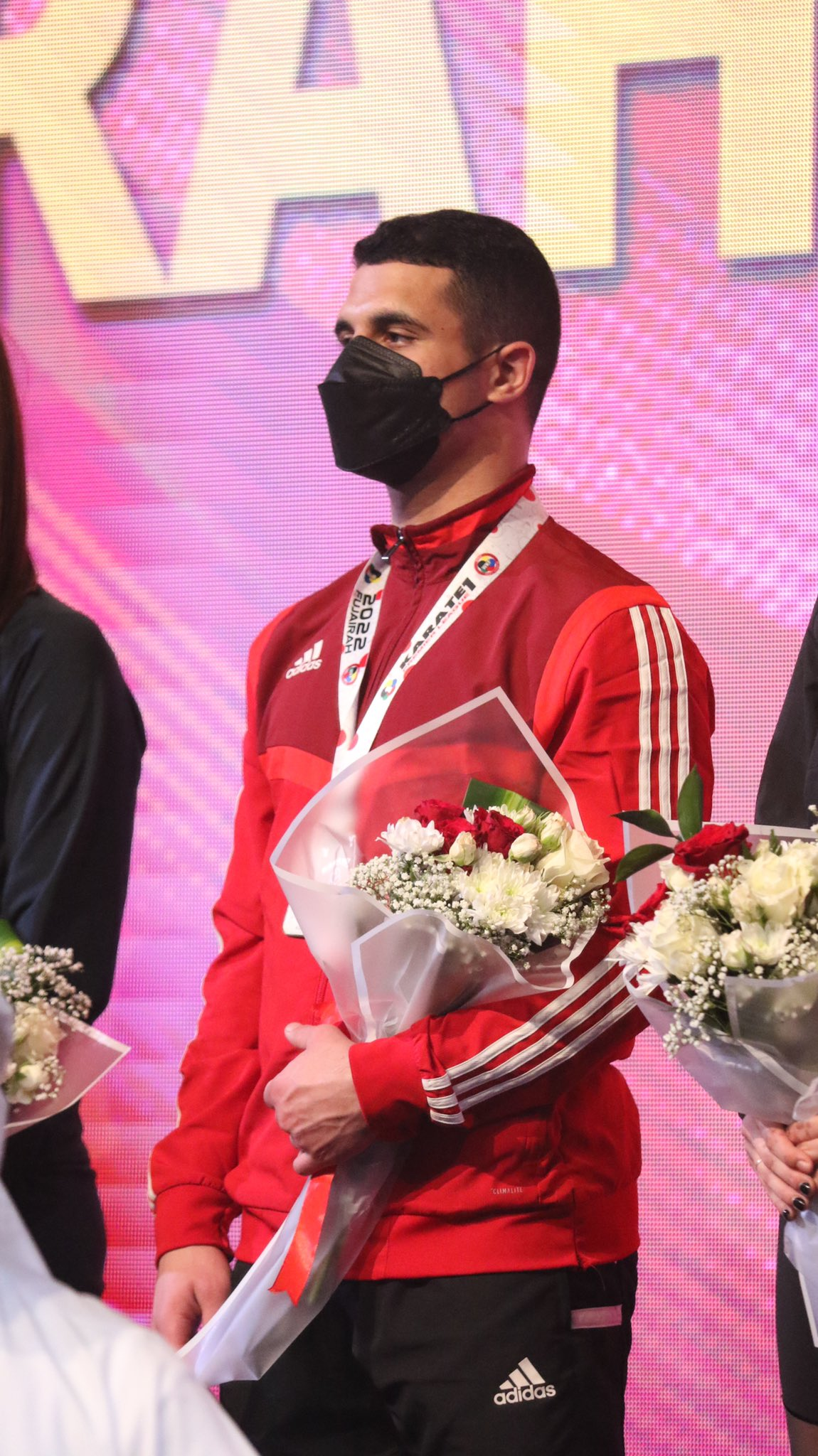
Fujairah premier league award ceremony

In May, Badawy made it to the first place in the world ranking of his category. Days later he welcomed another gold medal to his records at Rabat Karate1 Premier League.

==== Mediterranean Games 2022 ====
Outmatching his opponent at the Mediterranean Games semifinal, Badawy received a hard blow to the head that knocked him out for a few seconds. He resumed the bout to win with a 4–1 score despite his condition. He was then moved to the hospital for a checkup, and the Egyptian Olympic Committee stated that he will not play the final for the sake of his safety. Abdel Fattah al-Najjar, head coach of the Egyptian Karate team, confirmed that Badawy underwent a crying fit on being notified of his imminent official disqualification from the final match and surprised everyone by insisting on playing the final with a promise that the gold medal is Egypt's. He played at the final and won the gold medal with a 6–4 score.

==== World Games 2022 ====
Competing against the best seven players in the world, Badawy started off with a win against the Moroccan champion Nabil Ech-Chaabi then another one against the Dutchman champion Brian Timmermans to be qualified to vie against Ivan Kvesić in the semifinal. Badawy had to clash with Nabil Ech-Chaabi for a second time in the tournament at the final at which he pulled off a last-second victory by signing an offensive Yuko after the annulment of Ech-Chaabi's Senshu to balance the score 6-6 and win by Hantei.

In September, Badawy achieved the gold medal at the last premier league of the 2022 season which was held in Baku, Azerbaijan. In October, Badawy played for Al Nassr Sporting Club at the national league for teams and placed 1st. For the finale of the 2022 season, Badawy seized the continental title of African Champion at The African Championship held in Durban, South Africa, with a clean sheet throughout his four rounds and won the gold medal for the kumite team event as well.

=== 2023 season ===
Badawy had a rough start for the 2023 season as he had to sit out the Karate Premier League held in his hometown, Cairo, Egypt, because of his jaw injury. On 7 January, two weeks before the Premier League, Badawy was competing at the Saudi national league when he received a hard blow in the face. He was diagnosed with a jaw dislocation and had to undergo a surgery, hindering his participation in any combat during his recovery period.

He preserved his seat on the throne of the world ranking for the months of January, March, and May. In July, Badawy featured his first seminar and training camp in Stockholm, Sweden. In August, Badawy celebrated his return for the 2023 season with a gold medal at the individual and team event at the African Championship in Casablanca, Morocco.

Badawy concluded the season with a gold medal at the 2023 World Karate Championships held in Budapest, Hungary, and a silver medal for the kumite team event for the first time in the Egyptian karate history since Tampere World Karate Championship's bronze medal. Badawy becomes the first male Egyptian karateka to win two consecutive world golds at the senior world championships.

Budapest World Championship results
Egypt
Bout	Contender	Nationality	Result
1st Bout	Yonatan Freund	Australia	8/0
2nd Bout	Bjorn Kulovuori	Finland	6/4
3rd Bout	Makhtar Diop	Senegal	0/0 (winner by Hantei)
Quarter Final	Valerii Chobotar	Ukraine	6/1
Semi Final	Eduard Gasparian	ROC	7/3
Final	Mahdi Khodobakhshi	Iran	9/2

Badawy participated in Moscow Karate Universe international competition two weeks after the world championship and achieved a gold medal.

=== 2024 season ===
Badawy started the 2024 season with winning a bronze medal at the premier league held in Paris, France, after an absence from the Karate 1 Premier League event since Baku 2022. He won against Croatian champion Ivan Kvesić at the eliminations bouts and against Japanese champion Rikito Shimada at the bronze medal match with a 6–4 score. He claimed the African Games champion title in March, and in the same month, he claimed another gold medal at Karate 1 Premier League in Antalya, Turkey. He participated in the USA Open Championships and attained two gold medals for the Individual -84 kg event and the team event.

For the third Premier League event, Badawy lost the final match to Mohammad Al-Jafari who won with an 8-point advantage. At the final Premier League event for the season, Badawy managed to secure the Grand Winner title by winning the quarter final match with a transformed score from 9–5 to 9–9 in the last three seconds of the match. Badawy lost the semi-final match and the bronze match, placing fifth; however, he expressed his satisfaction with his performance and his new Grand Winner title, which he has been aspiring to since Cairo Premier League 2023.

"An unbelievable fight which was 9-4 for the opponent with 9 seconds left, losing this fight would prevent me from being the Grand Winner. Looking at Sensei Hany Keshta at this moment saying to me, "I am already satisfied with your performance, but do your best till the end." His words relieved pressure on me and also encouraged me to do my best even if I see that 5 points in the last 9 seconds is kind of impossible. BUT I DID IT. In these moments, I only want support and encouragement to continue fighting, not karate instructions, and that is what exactly Sensei Hany did. Thank you great Hany. Big respect to the opponent."

— Youssef Badawy on winning the Karate1 Casablanca quarter-final match.

Badawy contended at the Moscow Karate Universe competition for a second time and placed third after a long hiatus period. For the end of the 2024 season Badawy competed with his national team at the Karate World Cup held in Pamplona, Spain, and won a gold medal with a 3–0 win against the Islamic Republic of Iran national team to close out the season with a historical win.

=== 2025 season ===
Badawy achieved a gold medal at the Karate Premier League held in Paris, France, at the beginning of the 2025 season. In March, Badawy repeated his gold medal achievement with a Hantei win in the Karate Premier League held in Hangzhou, China. He gained his third gold for the season against Mohammad Al-Jafari with a Hantei win for a second time this season at the Karate Premier League held in his hometown, Cairo, despite competing with a broken arm. In the final Premier League event of the season, Badawy lost in the semi-final match following a last-second victory by his opponent, with multiple medical interventions occurring during the bout. After consulting with doctors regarding his sustained scaphoid fracture, Badawy had to withdraw from the bronze medal match. Despite this setback, he successfully retained his Grand Winner title for the second consecutive year.

== Personal life ==
Badawy is an engineering undergraduate and has majored in mechanical engineering. Badawy married Bosnian karateka Emina Sipović in 2026.

== Techniques and skills ==
Badawy is generally recognized by his on-target kicks and particularly by his known Ura mawashi, which he stated was his favorite move.

== Achievements ==
Competition results
Year	Competition	Venue	Rank/position	Event
2019	African Championship Zone 1	Marrakesh Morocco	Gold	Individual +76 kg Kumite
2019	Karate 1 Youth League	Limassol Cyprus	Gold	Individual +76 kg Kumite
2019	African Games	Rabat Morocco	Bronze	Kumite Team
2019	Junior, Cadet and U21 World Karate Championship	Santiago Chile	Bronze	U21 Individual -84 kg Kumite
2020	UFAK Junior & Senior Championships	Tangier Morocco	Silver	Kumite Team
2021	Karate 1 Premier League	Cairo Egypt	Gold	Individual -84 kg Kumite
2021	Karate 1 Premier League	Moscow ROC	Gold	Individual -84 kg Kumite
2021	2021 World Karate Championships	Dubai United Arab Emirates	Gold	Individual -84 kg Kumite
2021	UFAK Junior & Senior Championships	Cairo Egypt	Silver	Individual -84 kg Kumite
2022	Karate 1 Premier League	Fujairah United Arab Emirates	Gold	Individual -84 kg Kumite
2022	Karate 1 Premier League	Rabat Morocco	Gold	Individual -84 kg Kumite
2022	2022 Mediterranean Games	Oran Algeria	Gold	Individual -84 kg Kumite
2022	2022 World Games	Birmingham United States	Gold	Individual -84 kg Kumite
2022	Karate 1 Premier League	Baku Azerbaijan	Gold	Individual -84 kg Kumite
2022	UFAK Junior & Senior Championships	Durban South Africa	Gold	Individual -84 kg Kumite
2023	UFAK Junior & Senior Championships	Casablanca Morocco	Gold	Individual -84 kg Kumite
2023	2023 World Karate Championships	Budapest Hungary	Gold	Individual -84 kg Kumite
2023	Moscow Karate Universe	Moscow ROC	Gold	Individual -84 kg Kumite
2024	Karate 1 Premier League	Paris France	Bronze	Individual -84 kg Kumite
2024	African Games	Accra Ghana	Gold	Individual -84 kg Kumite
2024	Karate 1 Premier League	Antalya Turkey	Gold	Individual -84 kg Kumite
2024	US Open Championships	Dallas United States	Gold	Individual -84 kg Kumite
2024	US Open Championships	Dallas United States	Gold	Kumite Team
2024	Karate 1 Premier League	Cairo Egypt	Silver	Individual -84 kg Kumite
2024	Moscow Karate Universe	Moscow ROC	Bronze	Individual -84 kg Kumite
2024	Karate World Teams Cup	Pamplona Spain	Gold	Kumite Team
2024	Karate 1 Premier League	Paris France	Gold	Individual -84 kg Kumite
2024	Karate 1 Premier League	Hangzhou China	Gold	Individual -84 kg Kumite
2024	Karate 1 Premier League	Cairo Egypt	Gold	Individual -84 kg Kumite

== Honors and awards ==
In December 2019, Badawy was bestowed the third-class Order of the Republic by Egypt's president Abdel Fattah Al-Sisi for winning his world bronze medal in Chile. The Faculty of Engineering of Ain Shams University honored him for sport excellence and his four international achievements in karate of the 2022 year.

In 2024, Badawy was bestowed the Grand Winner Prize for all the medals he won in Karate 1-Premier League events. In July of the same year, he was bestowed the first-class Order of the Republic by Egypt's president Abdel Fattah Al-Sisi for his gold medal at the individual and teams event in the African Games in Ghana.
