= 2025 World Karate Championships – Men's 84 kg =

Men's kumite 84 kg at the 2025 World Karate Championships
- Venue: Cairo Stadium Indoor Halls Complex
- Location: Cairo, Egypt
- Dates: 28–30 November
- Competitors: 32

Medalists
gold medal	Youssef Badawy	Egypt
silver medal	Hasan Arslan	Turkey
bronze medal	Mohammad Al-Jafari	Jordan
bronze medal	Ivan Kvesić	Croatia

The men's kumite 84 kg competition at the 2025 World Karate Championships was held from 28 to 30 November 2025.

== Results ==
=== Group phase ===
==== Group A ====
Pos	Athlete	B	W	D	D^{0}	L	Pts	Score	(Japan)	(France)	(Azerbaijan)	(Brazil)
1	Rikito Shimada (JPN)	3	3	0	0	0	9	12–10	—	2–2	9–8	1–0
2	Hendrick Confiac (FRA)	3	2	0	0	1	6	9–5	2–2	—	5–3	2–0
3	Turgut Hasanov (AZE)	3	1	0	0	2	3	13–15	8–9	3–5	—	2–1
4	Felipe Alberto (BRA)	3	0	0	0	3	0	1–5	0–1	0–2	1–2	—

==== Group B ====
Pos	Athlete	B	W	D	D^{0}	L	Pts	Score		(Slovakia)	(Angola)	(Chinese Taipei)
1	Eduard Gasparian (WKF-1) [3]	3	3	0	0	0	9	10–5	—	4–2	2–1	4–2
2	Šimon Sečkár (SVK)	3	2	0	0	1	6	14–15	2–4	—	7–6	5–5
3	Leonardo Mayala (ANG)	3	1	0	0	2	3	10–10	1–2	6–7	—	3–1
4	Pan Che-en (TPE)	3	0	0	0	3	0	8–12	2–4	5–5	1–3	—

==== Group C ====
Pos	Athlete	B	W	D	D^{0}	L	Pts	Score	(Colombia)	(Uzbekistan)	(Netherlands)	(Australia)
1	Rubén Henao (COL)	3	2	0	0	1	6 (Note: Henao (COL) 1–1, Namozov (UZB) 1–1, Timmermans (NED) 1–1. Scores obtained: Henao 6, Namozov 6, Timmermans 4. Henao 2–1 Namozov.)	6–3	—	2–1	0–1	4–1
2	Shuxratjon Namozov (UZB)	3	2	0	0	1	6	6–2	1–2	—	1–0	4–0
3	Brian Timmermans (NED)	3	2	0	0	1	6	4–1	1–0	0–1	—	3–0
4	Jonathan Freund (AUS)	3	0	0	0	3	0	1–11	1–4	0–4	0–3	—

==== Group D ====
Pos	Athlete	B	W	D	D^{0}	L	Pts	Score	(Egypt)	(Italy)	(Albania)	(Chile)
1	Youssef Badawy (EGY) [2]	3	3	0	0	0	9	10–3	—	2–1	3–0	5–2
2	Michele Martina (ITA)	3	1	0	1	1	3 (Note: Martina (ITA) 5–0 Melos (ALB))	6–2	1–2	—	5–0	0–0
3	Gashi Melos (ALB)	3	1	0	0	2	3	1–8	0–3	0–5	—	1–0
4	Fabián Huaiquimán (CHI)	3	0	0	1	2	0	2–6	2–5	0–0	0–1	—

==== Group E ====
Pos	Athlete	B	W	D	D^{0}	L	Pts	Score	(Algeria)	(Serbia)	(Iran)	(Ecuador)
1	Falleh Midoune (ALG)	3	3	0	0	0	9	9–7	—	5–4	2–2	2–1
2	Vladimir Brežančić (SRB)	3	2	0	0	1	6	19–11	4–5	—	6–0	9–6
3	Mehdi Khodabakhshi (IRI)	3	1	0	0	2	3	11–8	2–2	0–6	—	9–0
4	José Acevedo (ECU)	3	0	0	0	3	0	7–20	1–2	6–9	0–9	—

==== Group F ====
Pos	Athlete	B	W	D	D^{0}	L	Pts	Score	(Turkey)	(Tunisia)	(Greece)	(India)
1	Hasan Arslan (TUR)	3	3	0	0	0	9	10–0	—	4–0	5–0	1–0
2	Rayen Ghazouani (TUN)	3	2	0	0	1	6	9–5	0–4	—	5–1	4–0
3	Konstantinos Mastrogiannis (GRE) [4]	3	1	0	0	2	3	4–10	0–5	1–5	—	3–0
4	Mahara Booshanam Akshay (IND)	3	0	0	0	3	0	0–8	0–1	0–4	0–3	—

==== Group G ====
Pos	Athlete	B	W	D	D^{0}	L	Pts	Score	(Morocco)	(Ukraine)	(Guatemala)	(Armenia)
1	Mehdi Sriti (MAR)	3	3	0	0	0	9	17–4	—	3–2	6–1	8–1
2	Valerii Chobotar (UKR)	3	2	0	0	1	6	11–6	2–3	—	6–1	3–2
3	Brandon Ramírez (GUA)	3	1	0	0	2	3	12–18	1–6	1–6	—	10–6
4	Gor Nersisyan (ARM)	3	0	0	0	3	0	9–21	1–8	2–3	6–10	—

==== Group H ====
Pos	Athlete	B	W	D	D^{0}	L	Pts	Score	(Croatia)	(Jordan)	(England)	(Senegal)
1	Ivan Kvesić (CRO)	3	3	0	0	0	9	8–4	—	3–3	3–1	2–0
2	Mohammad Al-Jafari (JOR) [1]	3	2	0	0	1	6	18–6	3–3	—	7–3	8–0
3	Ashton Patrick (ENG)	3	0	0	1	2	0 (Note: Patrick (ENG) 0–0 Diop (SEN). Scores obtained: Patrick 4, Diop 0.)	4–10	1–3	3–7	—	0–0
4	Makhtar Diop (SEN)	3	0	0	1	2	0	0–10	0–2	0–8	0–0	—

=== Elimination phase ===
Round of 16; 28 November
Mohammad Al-Jafari (JOR)	9
Rikito Shimada (JPN)	7
Valerii Chobotar (UKR)	2
Eduard Gasparian (WKF-1)	5
Rayen Ghazouani (TUN)	8
Rubén Henao (COL)	5
Vladimir Brežančić (SRB)	3
Youssef Badawy (EGY)	4
Michele Martina (ITA)	4
Falleh Midoune (ALG)	3
Shuxratjon Namozov (UZB)	0
Hasan Arslan (TUR)	0
Šimon Sečkár (SVK)	0
Mehdi Sriti (MAR)	8
Hendrick Confiac (FRA)	0
Ivan Kvesić (CRO)	3

Quarterfinals; 29 November
Mohammad Al-Jafari (JOR)	5
Eduard Gasparian (WKF-1)	3
Rayen Ghazouani (TUN)	0
Youssef Badawy (EGY)	3
Michele Martina (ITA)	1
Hasan Arslan (TUR)	3
Mehdi Sriti (MAR)	2
Ivan Kvesić (CRO)	5

Semifinals; 29 November
Mohammad Al-Jafari (JOR)	4
Youssef Badawy (EGY)	4
Hasan Arslan (TUR)	2
Ivan Kvesić (CRO)	2

Final; 30 November
Youssef Badawy (EGY)	6
Hasan Arslan (TUR)	0

Bronze medals 30 November
Rayen Ghazouani (TUN)	0
Mohammad Al-Jafari (JOR)	10
Michele Martina (ITA)	0
Ivan Kvesić (CRO)	8
