= 2023 World Karate Championships – Men's 84 kg =

Men's kumite 84 kg at the 2023 World Karate Championships
- Venue: László Papp Budapest Sports Arena
- Location: Budapest, Hungary
- Dates: 24, 28 October
- Competitors: 66 from 66 nations

Medalists
gold medal	Youssef Badawy	Egypt
silver medal	Mehdi Khodabakhshi	Iran
bronze medal	Valerii Chobotar	Ukraine
bronze medal	Mohammad Al-Jafari	Jordan

The men's kumite 84 kg competition at the 2023 World Karate Championships was held on 24 and 28 October 2023.

== Results ==
=== Finals ===
Semifinals
Eduard Gasparyan	3
(Egypt) Youssef Badawy	7
(Japan) Rikito Shimada	5
(Iran) Mehdi Khodabakhshi	6

Final
(Egypt) Youssef Badawy	9
(Iran) Mehdi Khodabakhshi	2

=== Repechage ===
Repechage 1
(Australia) Yonatan Freund	3
(Finland) Björn Kulovuori	1

Repechage 2
(Australia) Yonatan Freund	3
(Senegal) Makhtar Diop	2

Repechage 3
(Australia) Yonatan Freund	2
(Ukraine) Valerii Chobotar	3

Bronze medal
(Ukraine) Valerii Chobotar	1
Eduard Gasparyan	0

Repechage 1
(Qatar) Abdulla Babikr	3
(Libya) Mohamed Al-Suwee	1

Repechage 2
(Qatar) Abdulla Babikr	1
(Bosnia and Herzegovina) Mahir Džuho	5

Repechage 3
(Bosnia and Herzegovina) Mahir Džuho	2
(Jordan) Mohammad Al-Jafari	6

Bronze medal
(Jordan) Mohammad Al-Jafari	8
(Japan) Rikito Shimada	5

=== Top half ===
==== Section 1 ====
First round
(Portugal) José Miranda	3
(Serbia) Vladimir Brežančić	5

Second round
(Serbia) Vladimir Brežančić	2
(South Africa) Nicolaas van Jaarsveld	0
Mahdi Ghararizadeh Mahani	0
(Cyprus) Loizos Vasiliou	2
(Colombia) Carlos Sinisterra	2
(Estonia) Mihkel Mets	1
(Poland) Michał Florczak	0
(Netherlands) Brian Timmermans	1
(France) Raybak Melk Abdesselem	8
(Slovenia) Uroš Markuljević	1
(Czech Republic) Jáchym Tinavský	7
(Indonesia) Sandi Firmansyah	1
Eduard Gasparyan	9
(Malaysia) Muhammad Arif Afifuddin	5
(India) Akshay Mahara Bhooshnam	0
(Italy) Michele Martina	3

Third round
(Serbia) Vladimir Brežančić	1
(Cyprus) Loizos Vasiliou	2
(Colombia) Carlos Sinisterra	2
(Netherlands) Brian Timmermans	1
(France) Raybak Melk Abdesselem	1
(Czech Republic) Jáchym Tinavský	1
Eduard Gasparyan	5
(Italy) Michele Martina	0

Fourth round
(Cyprus) Loizos Vasiliou	0
(Colombia) Carlos Sinisterra	3
(Czech Republic) Jáchym Tinavský	2
Eduard Gasparyan	6

Quarterfinals
(Colombia) Carlos Sinisterra	0
Eduard Gasparyan	4

==== Section 2 ====
First round

Second round
(Chinese Taipei) Chung Meng-yu	0
(Kosovo) Endrit Beka	4
(Germany) Janne Haubold	8
(Chile) Germán Charpentier	0
(Norway) Adrian Lopez Salas	3
(United States) Dennis Novo	8
(Algeria) Falleh Midoune	1
(Ukraine) Valerii Chobotar	6
(Slovakia) Adi Gyurík	2
(Senegal) Makhtar Diop	3
(Montenegro) Nikola Malović	4
(Mexico) Luis Vásquez	3
(Romania) Marian Mihalache	1
(Finland) Björn Kulovuori	2
(Australia) Yonatan Freund	0
(Egypt) Youssef Badawy	8

Third round
(Kosovo) Endrit Beka	0
(Germany) Janne Haubold	1
(United States) Dennis Novo	0
(Ukraine) Valerii Chobotar	1
(Senegal) Makhtar Diop	2
(Montenegro) Nikola Malović	2
(Finland) Björn Kulovuori	4
(Egypt) Youssef Badawy	6

Fourth round
(Germany) Janne Haubold	3
(Ukraine) Valerii Chobotar	4
(Senegal) Makhtar Diop	0
(Egypt) Youssef Badawy	0

Quarterfinals
(Ukraine) Valerii Chobotar	1
(Egypt) Youssef Badawy	6

=== Bottom half ===
==== Section 3 ====
First round
(Croatia) Enes Garibović	4
(Armenia) Hayk Karyan	2

Second round
(Croatia) Enes Garibović	2
(Kuwait) Yousef Mohammad	0
(Kazakhstan) Daniyar Yuldashev	4
(Spain) Joan Just	2
(Albania) Alvin Karaqi	2
(Republic of Ireland) Christopher McCarthy Crean	5
(Hungary) Dániel György	1
(Greece) Konstantinos Mastrogiannis	4
(Morocco) Mehdi Sriti	3
(Canada) Alexandre St-Arneault	0
(Venezuela) Freddy Valera	7
(Austria) Luca Rettenbacher	5
(Georgia (country)) Luka Vasadze	0
(Paraguay) Jesús Servín	1
(Denmark) Mads Viberg Larsen	0
(Japan) Rikito Shimada	4

Third round
(Croatia) Enes Garibović	1
(Kazakhstan) Daniyar Yuldashev	7
(Republic of Ireland) Christopher McCarthy Crean	1
(Greece) Konstantinos Mastrogiannis	2
(Morocco) Mehdi Sriti	4
(Venezuela) Freddy Valera	0
(Paraguay) Jesús Servín	1
(Japan) Rikito Shimada	9

Fourth round
(Kazakhstan) Daniyar Yuldashev	1
(Greece) Konstantinos Mastrogiannis	0
(Morocco) Mehdi Sriti	3
(Japan) Rikito Shimada	5

Quarterfinals
(Kazakhstan) Daniyar Yuldashev	2
(Japan) Rikito Shimada	4

==== Section 4 ====
First round

Second round
(Iran) Mehdi Khodabakhshi	9
(Qatar) Abdulla Babikr	0
(Bulgaria) Simeon Stoychev	1
(Libya) Mohamed Al-Suwee	2
(Azerbaijan) Turgut Hasanov	0
(Bosnia and Herzegovina) Mahir Džuho	4
(Belgium) Anouar Bougrine	2
(Saudi Arabia) Faraj Al-Nashri	5
(Turkey) Uğur Aktaş	8
(Latvia) Dens Sadikovs	2
(Uzbekistan) Alisulton Khojiev	2
(Sweden) Ozzy Haag	0
(North Macedonia) Petar Spasenovski	3
(Brazil) Diego Pereira	2
(Kenya) Christopher Wambua	0
(Jordan) Mohammad Al-Jafari	6

Third round
(Iran) Mehdi Khodabakhshi	5
(Libya) Mohamed Al-Suwee	0
(Bosnia and Herzegovina) Mahir Džuho	2
(Saudi Arabia) Faraj Al-Nashri	1
(Turkey) Uğur Aktaş	7
(Uzbekistan) Alisulton Khojiev	3
(North Macedonia) Petar Spasenovski	1
(Jordan) Mohammad Al-Jafari	8

Fourth round
(Iran) Mehdi Khodabakhshi	5
(Bosnia and Herzegovina) Mahir Džuho	2
(Turkey) Uğur Aktaş	3
(Jordan) Mohammad Al-Jafari	9

Quarterfinals
(Iran) Mehdi Khodabakhshi	4
(Jordan) Mohammad Al-Jafari	4
