= Karate Federation of Nigeria =

Governing body for karate in Nigeria

- Sport: Karate
- Jurisdiction: National
- Affiliation: World Karate Federation (WKF)
- Regional affiliation: Union of African Karate Federation
- (Nigeria)

The Karate Federation of Nigeria is the largest association for karate in Nigeria and a member as well as the official representative for this sport in the Nigeria Olympic Committee.

== International competition ==
Karate Federation of Nigeria is a member of the African umbrella organization Union of African Karate Federation (UAKF) as well as the World Association for World Karate Federation (WKF).

On the part of the Nigeria Olympic Committee, the Karate Federation of Nigeria is the only Karate Association authorized to send athletes to the Olympic Games.
