= 2021 World Karate Championships – Men's 84 kg =

World Karate Championship

Men's kumite 84 kg at the 2021 World Karate Championships
- Venue: Hamdan Sports Complex
- Location: Dubai, United Arab Emirates
- Dates: 16–20 November
- Competitors: 70 from 70 nations

Medalists
gold medal	Youssef Badawy	Egypt
silver medal	Fabián Huaiquimán	Chile
bronze medal	Yuta Mori	Japan
bronze medal	Jessie Da Costa	France

The Men's 84 kg competition at the 2021 World Karate Championships was held from 16 to 20 November 2021.

== Results ==
=== Finals ===
Semifinals
(Chile) Fabián Huaiquimán	5
(Morocco) Nabil Ech-chaabi	5
(France) Jessie Da Costa	2
(Egypt) Youssef Badawy	2

Final
(Chile) Fabián Huaiquimán	6
(Egypt) Youssef Badawy	6

=== Repechage ===
Repechage 1
(Japan) Yuta Mori	0
(El Salvador) Jorge Merino	0

Repechage 2
(Japan) Yuta Mori	2
(Colombia) Rubén Henao	1

Repechage 3
(Japan) Yuta Mori	4
(Albania) Alvin Karaqi	3

Repechage 4
(Japan) Yuta Mori	1
(Netherlands) Brian Timmermans	0

Bronze medal
(Japan) Yuta Mori	2
(Morocco) Nabil Ech-chaabi	0

Repechage 2
(Croatia) Ivan Kvesić	3
(Iraq) Othman Majeed Shvan	0

Repechage 3
(Croatia) Ivan Kvesić	7
(Brazil) Diego Silva	0

Repechage 4
(Croatia) Ivan Kvesić	4
(Saudi Arabia) Faraj Al-Nashri	0

Bronze medal
(Croatia) Ivan Kvesić	2
(France) Jessie Da Costa	4

=== Top half ===
==== Section 1 ====
First round
(Algeria) Anis Samy Brahimi	1
(Zimbabwe) Fortune Nyabanga	0
(Chile) Fabián Huaiquimán	3
(Japan) Yuta Mori	0

Second round
(Algeria) Anis Samy Brahimi	6
(Chinese Taipei) Wu Chun-wei	7
(Malaysia) Somanroy Arulveeran	7
(Pakistan) Muhammad Awais	2
(Republic of Ireland) Christopher McCarthy Crean	0
(Netherlands) Brian Timmermans	4
(Lithuania) Vaidotas Dobrovolskis	0
(India) Vishal	0
(Chile) Fabián Huaiquimán	0
(El Salvador) Jorge Merino	0
(Cyprus) Symeon Parpounas	0
(Colombia) Rubén Henao	2
(Estonia) Albert Baranov	2
(Italy) Michele Martina	3
(Argentina) Juan Cruz Minuet	0
(Albania) Alvin Karaqi	5

Third round
(Chinese Taipei) Wu Chun-wei	5
(Malaysia) Somanroy Arulveeran	0
(Netherlands) Brian Timmermans	2
(Lithuania) Vaidotas Dobrovolskis	1
(Chile) Fabián Huaiquimán	6
(Colombia) Rubén Henao	1
(Italy) Michele Martina	0
(Albania) Alvin Karaqi	1

Fourth round
(Chinese Taipei) Wu Chun-wei	0
(Netherlands) Brian Timmermans	1
(Chile) Fabián Huaiquimán	3
(Albania) Alvin Karaqi	2

Quarterfinals
(Netherlands) Brian Timmermans	0
(Chile) Fabián Huaiquimán	1

==== Section 2 ====
First round
(Uzbekistan) Ibrokhim Khujayorov	3
(Tunisia) Thameur Slimani	5

Second round
(Tunisia) Thameur Slimani	2
(Morocco) Nabil Ech-chaabi	3
(Slovakia) Maroš Janovčík	1
(Greece) Konstantinos Mastrogiannis	6
(Serbia) Vladimir Brežančić	5
(Kuwait) Mohammad Al-Mijadi	3
(England) Devante Walters	0
(Portugal) Tomás Silva	7
(Azerbaijan) Panah Abdullayev	2
(Bosnia and Herzegovina) Meris Muhović	1
(North Macedonia) Berat Jakupi	0
(Belgium) Anouar Bougrine	1
(Finland) Björn Kulovuori
(Hong Kong) Lau Bak Hang
(Kosovo) Benjamin Shabani	2
(Ukraine) Valerii Chobotar	5

Third round
(Morocco) Nabil Ech-chaabi	5
(Greece) Konstantinos Mastrogiannis	0
(Serbia) Vladimir Brežančić	0
(Portugal) Tomás Silva	0
(Azerbaijan) Panah Abdullayev	1
(Belgium) Anouar Bougrine	1
(Finland) Björn Kulovuori	0
(Ukraine) Valerii Chobotar	3

Fourth round
(Morocco) Nabil Ech-chaabi	0
(Portugal) Tomás Silva	0
(Azerbaijan) Panah Abdullayev	1
(Ukraine) Valerii Chobotar	2

Quarterfinals
(Morocco) Nabil Ech-chaabi	0
(Ukraine) Valerii Chobotar	0

=== Bottom half ===
==== Section 3 ====
First round
(Jordan) Mazin Juaidi	1
(United States) Kamran Madani	0
(France) Jessie Da Costa	3
(Switzerland) Keanu Cattin	0

Second round
(Jordan) Mazin Juaidi	2
(Ecuador) José Acevedo	7
(Poland) Dawid Sobkowiak	0
(Georgia (country)) Khvicha Kiparoidze	2
(Norway) Adrian Lopez Salas	6
(Mexico) Jorge Viveros	0
(Kazakhstan) Igor Chikhmarev	0
(Hungary) Tibor Hidasi	0
(France) Jessie Da Costa	8
(Spain) Lander Orbea	0
(Kenya) Christopher Wambua	2
(Canada) Mohammad Reza Nikbakhsh	3
(Venezuela) Freddy Valera	4
(Denmark) Michel Corbalan	3
(Germany) Janne Haubold	4
(Belarus) Anton Isakau	5

Third round
(Ecuador) José Acevedo	0
(Georgia (country)) Khvicha Kiparoidze	3
(Norway) Adrian Lopez Salas	1
(Hungary) Tibor Hidasi	0
(France) Jessie Da Costa	3
(Canada) Mohammad Reza Nikbakhsh	2
(Venezuela) Freddy Valera	0
(Belarus) Anton Isakau	3

Fourth round
(Georgia (country)) Khvicha Kiparoidze	3
(Norway) Adrian Lopez Salas	0
(France) Jessie Da Costa	2
(Belarus) Anton Isakau	1

Quarterfinals
(Georgia (country)) Khvicha Kiparoidze	0
(France) Jessie Da Costa	1

==== Section 4 ====
First round
(Luxembourg) Adil Khaidar	0
Aleksandr Shcherban	4

Second round
Aleksandr Shcherban	2
(Romania) Vlad Iorga	6
(Austria) Robin Rettenbacher	4
(Latvia) Dens Sadikovs	3
(South Korea) Baek Junh-yeok	2
(Bolivia) Mohamed Dames	4
(Saudi Arabia) Faraj Al-Nashri	6
(Bulgaria) Simeon Stoychev	0
(Brazil) Diego Silva	3
(Sweden) Jimmy Haag	0
(Turkey) Samed Gök	7
(Montenegro) Nikola Malović	4
(South Africa) Slade Taylor	1
(Iraq) Othman Majeed Shvan	5
(Egypt) Youssef Badawy	5
(Croatia) Ivan Kvesić	4

Third round
(Romania) Vlad Iorga	2
(Austria) Robin Rettenbacher	7
(Bolivia) Mohamed Dames	3
(Saudi Arabia) Faraj Al-Nashri	5
(Brazil) Diego Silva	2
(Turkey) Samed Gök	0
(Iraq) Othman Majeed Shvan	0
(Egypt) Youssef Badawy	10

Fourth round
(Austria) Robin Rettenbacher	0
(Saudi Arabia) Faraj Al-Nashri	2
(Brazil) Diego Silva	2
(Egypt) Youssef Badawy	6

Quarterfinals
(Saudi Arabia) Faraj Al-Nashri	5
(Egypt) Youssef Badawy	7
