= 2026 European Karate Championships – Men's 84 kg =

Men's 84 kg at the 2026 European Karate Championships
- Venue: Eissporthalle Frankfurt
- Location: Frankfurt, Germany
- Dates: 20, 23 May
- Competitors: 31 from 31 nations

Medalists
gold medal	Eduard Gasparian
silver medal	Konstantinos Mastrogiannis	Greece
bronze medal	Nemanja Mikulić	Montenegro
bronze medal	Ivan Kvesić	Croatia

The men's 84 kg competition at the 2026 European Karate Championships was held on 20 and 23 May 2026.

== Results ==
=== Finals ===
Semifinals
(Croatia) Ivan Kvesić	0
(Greece) Konstantinos Mastrogiannis	5
(Ukraine) Valerii Chobotar	1
Eduard Gasparian	2

Final
(Greece) Konstantinos Mastrogiannis	6
Eduard Gasparian	6

=== Repechage ===
Repechage 1
(Montenegro) Nemanja Mikulić	8
Hleb Sachkouski	4

Bronze medal
(Montenegro) Nemanja Mikulić	0
(Ukraine) Valerii Chobotar	0

Repechage 1
(Turkey) Hasan Arslan	3
(Armenia) Gor Nersisyan	0

Repechage 2
(Turkey) Hasan Arslan	0
(Germany) Janne Haubold	4

Bronze medal
(Germany) Janne Haubold	3
(Croatia) Ivan Kvesić	8

=== Top half ===
==== Section 1 ====
Round of 32
(Azerbaijan) Turgut Hasanov	5
(Slovakia) Šimon Sečkár	1
(Serbia) Vladimir Brežančić	2
(Italy) Matteo Fiore	2
(North Macedonia) Rexhep Rushiti	3
(Georgia (country)) Ika Sulamanidze	1
(Scotland) Cameron Furness	0
(Croatia) Ivan Kvesić	5

Round of 16
(Azerbaijan) Turgut Hasanov	4
(Serbia) Vladimir Brežančić	3
(North Macedonia) Rexhep Rushiti	0
(Croatia) Ivan Kvesić	3

Quarterfinals
(Azerbaijan) Turgut Hasanov	3
(Croatia) Ivan Kvesić	6

==== Section 2 ====
Round of 32
(Kosovo) Jakup Ajdari	7
(Romania) Vlad Rizea	6
(Albania) Melos Gashi	3
(Germany) Janne Haubold	8
(Cyprus) Demetris Demetriades	3
(Armenia) Gor Nersisyan	4
(Greece) Konstantinos Mastrogiannis	0
(Turkey) Hasan Arslan	0

Round of 16
(Kosovo) Jakup Ajdari	7
(Germany) Janne Haubold	8
(Armenia) Gor Nersisyan	1
(Greece) Konstantinos Mastrogiannis	9

Quarterfinals
(Germany) Janne Haubold	0
(Greece) Konstantinos Mastrogiannis	2

=== Bottom half ===
==== Section 3 ====
Round of 32
(France) Issa Lardjoum	3
(Netherlands) Brian Timmermans	0
(Poland) Wiktor Wojarski	1
(Latvia) Leonīds Vorožeikins	1
(Iceland) Hugi Halldórsson	0
(Spain) Iker Leal	5
(Denmark) Noah Ephrem Kristensen	0
(Ukraine) Valerii Chobotar	1

Round of 16
(France) Issa Lardjoum	2
(Poland) Wiktor Wojarski	2
(Spain) Iker Leal	3
(Ukraine) Valerii Chobotar	5

Quarterfinals
(Poland) Wiktor Wojarski	1
(Ukraine) Valerii Chobotar	2

==== Section 4 ====
Round of 32
(Finland) Björn Kulovuori	2
(Republic of Ireland) Anthony Kelly	0
Hleb Sachkouski	9
(Switzerland) Théo Pedro	0
(Bosnia and Herzegovina) Hamza Turulja	0
(Montenegro) Nemanja Mikulić	1

Round of 16
(Finland) Björn Kulovuori	5
Hleb Sachkouski	6
(Montenegro) Nemanja Mikulić	2
Eduard Gasparian	7

Quarterfinals
Hleb Sachkouski	3
Eduard Gasparian	6
