= 2025 European Karate Championships – Men's 84 kg =

European Karate Championship

Men's 84 kg at the 2025 European Karate Championships
- Venue: Karen Demirchyan Sports and Concerts Complex
- Location: Yerevan, Armenia
- Dates: 7, 10 May
- Competitors: 33 from 31 nations

Medalists
gold medal	Ivan Kvesić	Croatia
silver medal	Valerii Chobotar	Ukraine
bronze medal	Janne Haubold	Germany
bronze medal	Gor Nersisyan	Armenia

The Men's 84 kg competition at the 2025 European Karate Championships was held on 7 and 10 May 2025.

== Results ==
=== Finals ===
Semifinals
Eduard Gasparian	3
(Ukraine) Valerii Chobotar	5
(Croatia) Ivan Kvesić	7
(Armenia) Gor Nersisyan	1

Final
(Ukraine) Valerii Chobotar	1
(Croatia) Ivan Kvesić	9

=== Repechage ===
Repechage 1
(Germany) Janne Haubold	5
(North Macedonia) Petar Spasenovski	5

Repechage 2
(Germany) Janne Haubold	7
(Albania) Melos Gashi	1

Bronze medal
(Germany) Janne Haubold	6
Eduard Gasparian	4

Repechage 1
(Turkey) Hasan Arslan	2
(Republic of Ireland) Anthony Kelly	0

Repechage 2
(Turkey) Hasan Arslan	1
(Slovakia) Šimon Sečkár	2

Bronze medal
(Slovakia) Šimon Sečkár	2
(Armenia) Gor Nersisyan	5

=== Top half ===
==== Section 1 ====
Round of 64
(Netherlands) Brian Timmermans	2
(Sweden) Jimmy Haag	0

Round of 32
(Netherlands) Brian Timmermans	2
(Malta) Luke Galea	0
(Georgia (country)) Khvicha Kiparoidze	0
(Latvia) Andreass Meļņičenko	0
(Serbia) Vladimir Brežančić	4
(Denmark) Mads Viberg Larsen	2
(Poland) Michał Florczak	0
Eduard Gasparian	8

Round of 16
(Malta) Luke Galea	0
(Georgia (country)) Khvicha Kiparoidze	0
(Serbia) Vladimir Brežančić	2
Eduard Gasparian	4

Quarterfinals
(Georgia (country)) Khvicha Kiparoidze	0
Eduard Gasparian	8

==== Section 2 ====
Round of 64

Round of 32
Hleb Sachkouski	0
(England) Ashton Patrick	0
(Bosnia and Herzegovina) Hamza Turulja	1
(Albania) Melos Gashi	3
(France) Hendrick Confiac	1
(North Macedonia) Petar Spasenovski	2
(Germany) Janne Haubold	1
(Ukraine) Valerii Chobotar	1

Round of 16
Hleb Sachkouski	0
(Albania) Melos Gashi	3
(North Macedonia) Petar Spasenovski	3
(Ukraine) Valerii Chobotar	3

Quarterfinals
(Albania) Melos Gashi	0
(Ukraine) Valerii Chobotar	2

=== Bottom half ===
==== Section 3 ====
Round of 64

Round of 32
(Hungary) Botond Botos	4
(Italy) Matteo Fiore	3
(Slovakia) Šimon Sečkár	2
(Finland) Björn Kulovuori	1
(Republic of Ireland) Anthony Kelly	1
(Spain) Abdellah Rouiha	0
(Turkey) Hasan Arslan	2
(Croatia) Ivan Kvesić	4

Round of 16
(Hungary) Botond Botos	0
(Slovakia) Šimon Sečkár	0
(Republic of Ireland) Anthony Kelly	0
(Croatia) Ivan Kvesić	5

Quarterfinals
(Slovakia) Šimon Sečkár	1
(Croatia) Ivan Kvesić	7

==== Section 4 ====
Round of 64

Round of 32
(Romania) Leonard Moise	1
(Armenia) Gor Nersisyan	3
(Montenegro) Nikola Malović	1
(Portugal) Gonçalo Freitas	0
(Norway) Adrián López	3
(Czech Republic) Jáchym Tinavský	5
(Kosovo) Jakup Ajdari	5
(Greece) Konstantinos Mastrogiannis	1

Round of 16
(Armenia) Gor Nersisyan	7
(Montenegro) Nikola Malović	4
(Czech Republic) Jáchym Tinavský	0
(Kosovo) Jakup Ajdari	2

Quarterfinals
(Armenia) Gor Nersisyan	2
(Kosovo) Jakup Ajdari	3
