= Karate at the 2025 World Games – Men's kumite 84 kg =

Men's kumite 84 kg at the 2025 World Games
- Venue: Jianyang Cultural and Sports Centre Gymnasium
- Location: Chengdu, China
- Dates: 9 August
- Competitors: 8 from 8 nations

Medalists
gold medal	Mohammad Al-Jafari	Jordan
silver medal	Ivan Kvesić	Croatia
bronze medal	Rikito Shimada	Japan

The men's kumite 84 kg competition in karate at the 2025 World Games took place on 9 August 2025 at the Jianyang Cultural and Sports Centre Gymnasium in Chengdu, China.

== Results ==
=== Pool round ===
==== Pool A ====
Pos	Athlete	B	W	D	D^{0}	L	Pts	Score	(China)	(Japan)	(Ukraine)	Individual Neutral Athletes
1	Duan Peiqi (CHN)	3	2	1	0	0	7 (Note: Duan (CHN) 1–1 Shimada (JPN). Scores obtained: Duan 16, Shimada 6.)	16–8	—	1–1	12–6	3–1
2	Rikito Shimada (JPN)	3	2	1	0	0	7	6–1	1–1	—	3–0	2–0
3	Valerii Chobotar (UKR)	3	1	0	0	2	3	10–15	6–12	0–3	—	4–0
4	Eduard Gasparian (AIN)	3	0	0	0	3	0	1–9	1–3	0–2	0–4	—

Source: Chengdu 2025

==== Pool B ====
Pos	Athlete	B	W	D	D^{0}	L	Pts	Score	(Jordan)	(Croatia)	(Netherlands)	(Greece)
1	Mohammad Al-Jafari (JOR)	3	2	0	0	1	6 (Note: Al-Jafari (JOR) 8–0 Kvesić (CRO))	19–4	—	8–0	9–2	2–2
2	Ivan Kvesić (CRO)	3	2	0	0	1	6	10–11	0–8	—	5–3	5–0
3	Brian Timmermans (NED)	3	1	0	0	2	3 (Note: Timmermans (NED) 4–3 Mastrogiannis (GRE))	9–17	2–9	3–5	—	4–3
4	Konstantinos Mastrogiannis (GRE)	3	1	0	0	2	3	5–11	2–2	0–5	3–4	—

Source: Chengdu 2025

=== Finals ===
Semi-finals
Ivan Kvesić (CRO)	10
Duan Peiqi (CHN)	2
Rikito Shimada (JPN)	1
Mohammad Al-Jafari (JOR)	6

Gold medal bout
Ivan Kvesić (CRO)	0
Mohammad Al-Jafari (JOR)	4
Bronze medal bout
Duan Peiqi (CHN)	5
Rikito Shimada (JPN)	9
