= Jordan at the 2025 World Games =

- IOC code: JOR
- NOC: Jordan Olympic Committee

in Chengdu, China 7 August 2025 – 17 August 2025
- Competitors: 2 (2 men and 0 women) in 1 sport and 2 events
- Medals Ranked 49th: Gold 1 Silver 0 Bronze 1 Total 2

World Games appearances
- 1981; 1985; 1989; 1993; 1997; 2001; 2005; 2009; 2013; 2017; 2022; 2025

Jordan competed at the 2025 World Games held in Chengdu, China from 7 to 17 August 2025.

Athletes representing Jordan won one gold medal and one bronze medals. The country finished in 49th place in the medal table. Karateka Mohammad Al-Jafari won the nation's first World Games gold medal in history.

== Medalists ==
Medal	Name	Sport	Event	Date
Gold	Mohammad Al-Jafari	Karate	Men's kumite 84 kg	9 August
Bronze	Abdelrahman Al-Masatfa	Karate	Men's kumite 67 kg	8 August

== Competitors ==
The following is the list of number of competitors in the Games.

Sport	Men	Women	Total
Karate	2	0	2
Total	2	0	2
