= African Karate Championships =

Karate competition

Competition details
- Discipline: Karate
- Type: Kumite and Kata Individual and Team, Annual
- Organiser: African Karate Federation (UFAK)

History
- First edition: 1984 in Dakar, Senegal

The African Karate Championships are organised by the African Karate Federation each year.

== History ==
=== The first editions 1984 and 1985 ===
In the late 1970s, African karate began to become organized with the creation of the African Union of Karate (UAK) in 1978. However, other regional blocs emerged simultaneously, such as the Confederation of African Karate Amateur (CAKA) and the Union of Karate-Do Federations of Central Africa (UFKAC) both in 1980. It was under the banner of this momentum and the aegis of pioneering entities like the UAK that a committee was able to reach an agreement with the Senegalese Federation and the other pioneering African federations to launch the 1984 and 1985 editions in Dakar, Senegal. The World Karate Federation (WKF) sponsored these inaugural championships to encourage the development of official continental structures in Africa.

=== Creation of the UFAK ===
Recognizing the need to unify all these competing leagues (UAK, CAKA, UFKAC) to secure full recognition from the World Karate Federation (WKF), African leaders officially dissolved these former structures on 30 June 1987, in Dakar, and founded the current Union of African Karate Federations (UFAK).

Important figures helped establish these championships as early as 1984 such as masters Fernand Nunes, Cheikhou Oumar Tall, Alioune Badara Hane and Bouna Ndao serving as the essential technical experts and leaders who trained the first generation of referees and competitors capable of performing at a continental level. African leaders at the time worked closely with the president of WKF Jacques Delcourt, who required a fully unified African body in order to grant it full continental membership status. This is what prompted the UAK committees to formalize the 1987 merger.

== Editions ==
UAK/CAKA/UFKAC Championships (1984–1985) and UFAK Championships (since 1987).

=== Senior ===
Edition	Year	Date	Host City	Events	Leading country
Organized by UAK / CAKA / UFKAC
1	1984		Dakar, Senegal		Senegal
2	1985		Dakar, Senegal		Senegal
Organized by African Karate Federation (UFAK)
3	1987		Dakar, Senegal		Senegal
4	1992		Cairo, Egypt		
5	1994	21–24 July	Casablanca, Morocco		
6	1997		Dakar, Senegal		
7	1999		Johannesburg, South Africa		
8	2001	7–8 July	Antananarivo, Madagascar		
9	2004	4–5 September	Durban, South Africa	17	Egypt
10	2005	26–27 August	Luanda, Angola	17	Senegal
11	2007	–	Johannesburg, South Africa	Cancelled	
12	2008	9–10 August	Cotonou, Benin	17	Egypt
13	2010	6–7 August	Cape Town, South Africa	16	Egypt
14	2012	7–9 September	Rabat, Morocco	16	Egypt
15	2014	10–16 August	Dakar, Senegal	16	Egypt
16	2017	19 May–5 June	Yaoundé, Cameroon	16	Tunisia
17	2018	28 August–2 September	Kigali, Rwanda	16	Egypt
18	2019	12–14 July	Gaborone, Botswana	16	Morocco
19	2020	7–9 February	Tangier, Morocco	16	Algeria
20	2021	3–5 December	Cairo, Egypt	16	Egypt
21	2022	28 November–4 December	Durban, South Africa	16	Egypt
22	2023	14–20 August	Casablanca, Morocco	16	Egypt
23	2024	7–9 March	Accra, Ghana	16	Egypt
24	2025	25–27 July	Abuja, Nigeria	16	Egypt
25	2026	10–13 September	Algiers, Algeria	16	Egypt

=== Cadet, Junior and U-21 ===
Edition	Year	Date	Host City	Events	Leading country
1					
2					
3					
4	2004	1–4 September	Durban, South Africa	11	
5					
6	2009	24–30 July	Algiers, Algeria		
7	2013	26 August–30 September	Tunis, Tunisia		
8	2017	19 May–5 June	Yaoundé, Cameroon		
9	2018	28 August–2 September	Kigali, Rwanda		
10	2019	12–14 July	Gaborone, Botswana		Egypt
11	2020	7–9 February	Tangier, Morocco		Morocco
12	2021	3–5 December	Cairo, Egypt		Egypt
13	2022	28 November–4 December	Durban, South Africa		Egypt
14	2023	14–20 August	Casablanca, Morocco		Morocco
15	2024	7–9 March	Accra, Ghana		
16	2025	25–27 July	Abuja, Nigeria		Egypt
17	2026	10–13 September	Algiers, Algeria		Egypt
