= Karate at the 2023 Pan American Games – Men's 84 kg =

Men's 84 kg at the 2023 Pan American Games
- Venue: Contact Sports Center
- Dates: November 4
- Competitors: 9 from 9 nations

Medalists
Gold medal	José Acevedo	Ecuador
Silver medal	Rubén Henao	Colombia
Bronze medal	Jorge Merino	El Salvador
Bronze medal	Saisheren Senpon	United States

The men's 84 kg competition of the karate events at the 2023 Pan American Games was held on November 4 at the Contact Sports Center (Centro de Entrenamiento de los Deportes de Contacto) in Santiago, Chile.

== Schedule ==
Date	Time	Round
November 4, 2023	12:03	Pool matches
November 4, 2023	16:11	Semifinals
November 4, 2023	17:21	Final

== Results ==
The athletes with the two best scores of each pool advance to the semifinals.

=== Pool A ===
Rk	Athlete	Pld	W	L	Pts.
1	Rubén Henao (COL)	3	3	0	9
2	José Acevedo (ECU)	3	2	1	6
3	Pablo Benavides (MEX)	3	1	2	3
4	Jesús Servin (PAR)	3	0	3	0

	Score	
José Acevedo (ECU)	1–8	Rubén Henao (COL)
Jesús Servin (PAR)	3–4	Pablo Benavides (MEX)
José Acevedo (ECU)	9–2	Jesús Servin (PAR)
Rubén Henao (COL)	4–1	Pablo Benavides (MEX)
José Acevedo (ECU)	7–4	Pablo Benavides (MEX)
Rubén Henao (COL)	4–1	Jesús Servin (PAR)

=== Pool B ===
Rk	Athlete	Pld	W	L	Pts.
1	Jorge Merino (ESA)	4	4	0	12
2	Saisheren Senpon (USA)	4	3	1	9
3	Fabián Huaiquimán (CHI)	4	2	2	6
4	Tomas Greer (PUR)	4	1	3	3
5	Brandon Ramírez (EAI)	4	0	4	0

	Score	
Fabián Huaiquimán (CHI)	4–2	Tomas Greer (PUR)
Saisheren Senpon (USA)	0–3	Jorge Merino (ESA)
Brandon Ramírez (EAI)	0–0	Jorge Merino (ESA)
Tomas Greer (PUR)	2–3	Saisheren Senpon (USA)
Fabián Huaiquimán (CHI)	2–5	Saisheren Senpon (USA)
Brandon Ramírez (EAI)	0–0	Tomas Greer (PUR)
Fabián Huaiquimán (CHI)	1–9	Jorge Merino (ESA)
Brandon Ramírez (EAI)	0–0	Saisheren Senpon (USA)
Brandon Ramírez (EAI)	0–0	Fabián Huaiquimán (CHI)
Tomas Greer (PUR)	2–3	Jorge Merino (ESA)

=== Finals ===
The results were as follows:

Semifinals
Rubén Henao (COL)	7
Saisheren Senpon (USA)	2
Jorge Merino (ESA)	1
José Acevedo (ECU)	5

Gold medal match
Rubén Henao (COL)	2
José Acevedo (ECU)	3
