= Karate at the 2022 Mediterranean Games – Men's 84 kg =

Men's kumite 84 kg at the 2022 Mediterranean Games
- Venue: Mohammed ben Ahmed CCO Hall 03 and 06
- Date: 27 June
- Competitors: 16 from 16 nations

Medalists
gold medal	Youssef Badawy	Egypt
silver medal	Vladimir Brežančić	Serbia
bronze medal	Ivan Kvesić	Croatia
bronze medal	Uğur Aktaş	Turkey

The men's 84 kg competition in karate at the 2022 Mediterranean Games was held on 27 June at the Mohammed ben Ahmed CCO Hall 03 and 06 in Oran.

== Results ==
=== Bracket ===
Round of 16
Falleh Midoune (ALG)	2
Vladimir Brežančić (SRB)	10
Dany Makamata (FRA)	3
Melos Gashi (KOS)	0
Demetris Demetriades (CYP)	2
Ivan Kvesić (CRO)	4
Meris Muhović (BIH)	0
Nikola Malović (MNE)	2
Konstantinos Mastrogiannis (GRE)	1
Michele Martina (ITA)	3
José Ibáñez (ESP)	1
Thamer Slimani (TUN)	1
Uğur Aktaş (TUR)	0
Youssef Badawy (EGY)	1
Petar Spasenovski (MKD)	0
Nabil Ech-Chaabi (MAR)	8

Quarterfinals
Vladimir Brežančić (SRB)	1
Dany Makamata (FRA)	1
Ivan Kvesić (CRO)	3
Nikola Malović (MNE)	1
Michele Martina (ITA)	1
José Ibáñez (ESP)	2
Youssef Badawy (EGY)	4
Nabil Ech-Chaabi (MAR)	2

Semifinals
Vladimir Brežančić (SRB)	4
Ivan Kvesić (CRO)	0
José Ibáñez (ESP)	1
Youssef Badawy (EGY)	4

Final
Vladimir Brežančić (SRB)	4
Youssef Badawy (EGY)	6

=== Repechage ===
Repechage
Falleh Midoune (ALG)	8
Dany Makamata (FRA)	0

Bronze medal
Falleh Midoune (ALG)	2
Ivan Kvesić (CRO)	8

Repechage
Uğur Aktaş (TUR)	4
Nabil Ech-Chaabi (MAR)	4

Bronze medal
Uğur Aktaş (TUR)	3
José Ibáñez (ESP)	2
