= Karate at the 2022 World Games – Men's kumite 84 kg =

Men's kumite 84 kg at the 2022 World Games
- Venue: Bill Battle Coliseum
- Location: Birmingham, United States
- Dates: 9 July
- Competitors: 7 from 7 nations

Medalists
gold medal	Youssef Badawy	Egypt
silver medal	Nabil Ech-chaabi	Morocco
bronze medal	Kamran Madani	United States

The men's kumite 84 kg competition in karate at the 2022 World Games took place on 9 July 2022 at the Bill Battle Coliseum in Birmingham, United States.

== Results ==
=== Elimination round ===
==== Pool A ====
Pos	Athlete	B	W	D	L	Pts	Score	(United States)	(Croatia)	(France)	(Chile)
1	Kamran Madani (USA)	3	2	0	1	4	9–10	—	2–1	4–2	3–7
2	Ivan Kvesić (CRO)	3	2	0	1	4	16–9	1–2	—	8–6	7–1
3	Jessie Da Costa (FRA)	3	1	0	2	2	10–14	2–4	6–8	—	2–2
4	Fabián Huaiquimán (CHI)	3	1	0	2	2	10–12	7–3	1–7	2–2	—

Source: Birmingham 2022

==== Pool B ====
Pos	Athlete	B	W	D	L	Pts	Score	(Egypt)	(Morocco)	(Netherlands)
1	Youssef Badawy (EGY)	2	2	0	0	4	6–0	—	5–0	1–0
2	Nabil Ech-chaabi (MAR)	2	1	0	1	2	3–7	0–5	—	3–2
3	Brian Timmermans (NED)	2	0	0	2	0	2–4	0–1	2–3	—

Source: Birmingham 2022

=== Finals ===
Semi-finals
Kamran Madani (USA)	2
Nabil Ech-chaabi (MAR)	5
Youssef Badawy (EGY)	4
Ivan Kvesić (CRO)	4

Gold medal bout
Nabil Ech-chaabi (MAR)	6
Youssef Badawy (EGY)	6
Bronze medal bout
Kamran Madani (USA)	4
Ivan Kvesić (CRO)	0
