= Karate at the 2018 Summer Youth Olympics – Boys' +68 kg =

Karate competition

Boys' Kumite +68 kg at the III Summer Youth Olympic Games
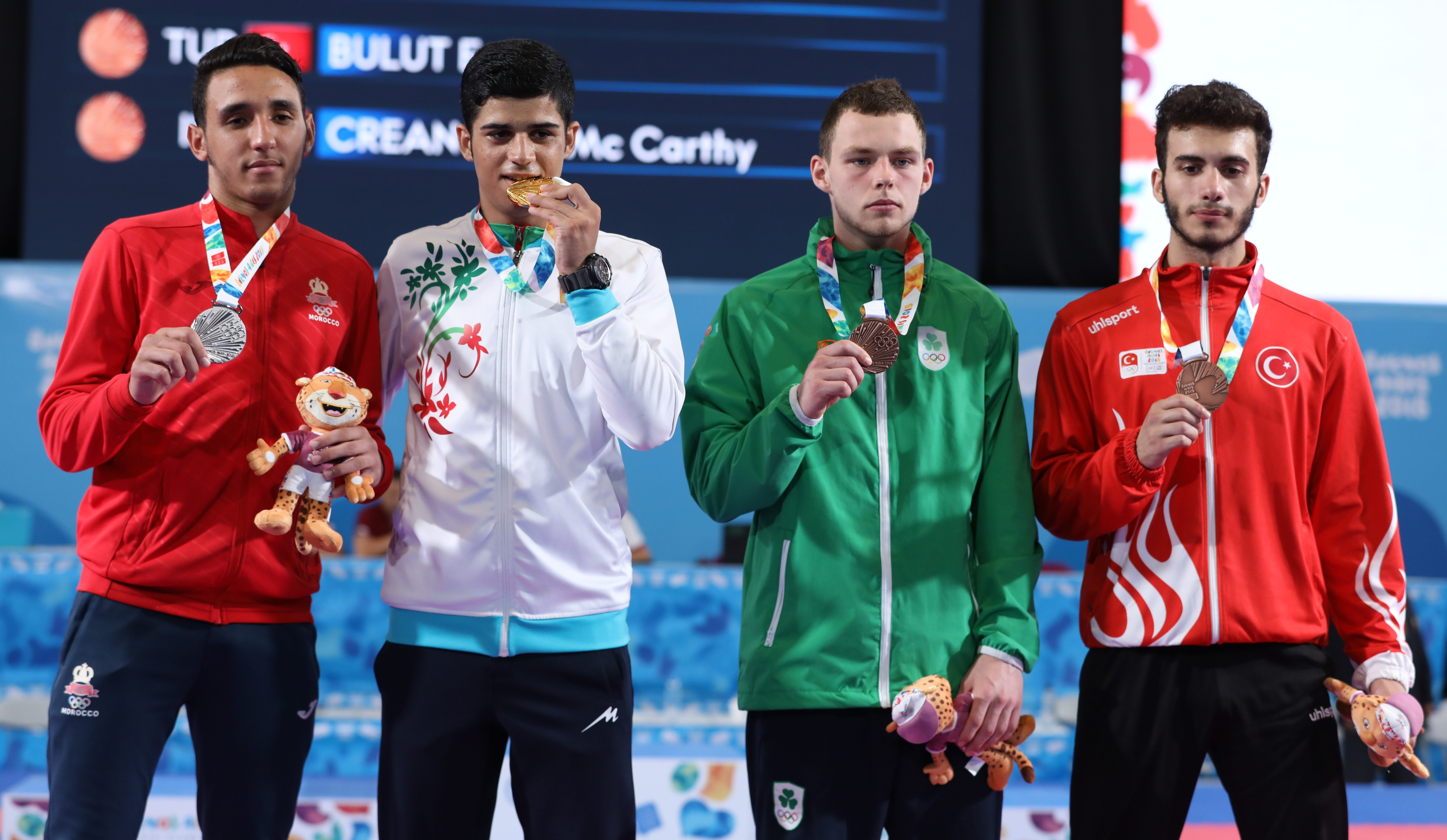
- Venue: Europa Pavilion
- Date: 18 October
- Competitors: 8 from 8 nations

Medalists
1st place, gold medalist(s)		Navid Mohammadi	Iran
2nd place, silver medalist(s)		Nabil Ech-Chaabi	Morocco
3rd place, bronze medalist(s)		Enes Bulut	Turkey
3rd place, bronze medalist(s)		Sean McCarthy Crean	Ireland

The boys' kumite +68 kg competition at the 2018 Summer Youth Olympics was held on 18 October at the Europa Pavilion in Buenos Aires, Argentina.

== Schedule ==
All times are in local time (UTC-3).

Date	Time	Round
Thursday, 18 October	11:10	Elimination round
Thursday, 18 October	14:30	Semifinals
Thursday, 18 October	14:56	Final

== Results ==
=== Elimination round ===
==== Pool A ====
Rank	Athlete	B	W	D	L	Pts	Score
1	Enes Bulut (TUR)	3	2	1	0	5	8–0
2	Nabil Ech-Chaabi (MAR)	3	1	2	0	4	8–0
3	Robert Avakimov (RUS)	3	1	0	2	2	4–16
4	Raukawa Jefferies (NZL)	3	0	1	2	1	1–5

	Score	
Enes Bulut (TUR)	1–0	Raukawa Jefferies (NZL)
Nabil Ech-Chaabi (MAR)	8–0	Robert Avakimov (RUS)
Nabil Ech-Chaabi (MAR)	0–0	Raukawa Jefferies (NZL)
Enes Bulut (TUR)	7–0	Robert Avakimov (RUS)
Robert Avakimov (RUS)	4–1	Raukawa Jefferies (NZL)
Enes Bulut (TUR)	0–0	Nabil Ech-Chaabi (MAR)

==== Pool B ====
Rank	Athlete	B	W	D	L	Pts	Score
1	Sean McCarthy Crean (IRL)	3	2	0	1	4	7–8
2	Navid Mohammadi (IRI)	3	2	0	1	4	6–4
3	Keisei Sakiyama (JPN)	3	2	0	1	4	4–2
4	Tomáš Kósa (SVK)	3	0	0	3	0	2–5

	Score	
Tomáš Kósa (SVK)	0–1	Keisei Sakiyama (JPN)
Navid Mohammadi (IRI)	5–2	Sean McCarthy Crean (IRL)
Navid Mohammadi (IRI)	0–2	Keisei Sakiyama (JPN)
Tomáš Kósa (SVK)	2–3	Sean McCarthy Crean (IRL)
Sean McCarthy Crean (IRL)	2–1	Keisei Sakiyama (JPN)
Tomáš Kósa (SVK)	0–1	Navid Mohammadi (IRI)

=== Semifinals ===
	Score	
Enes Bulut (TUR)	3–3	Navid Mohammadi (IRI)
Sean McCarthy Crean (IRL)	1–2	Nabil Ech-Chaabi (MAR)

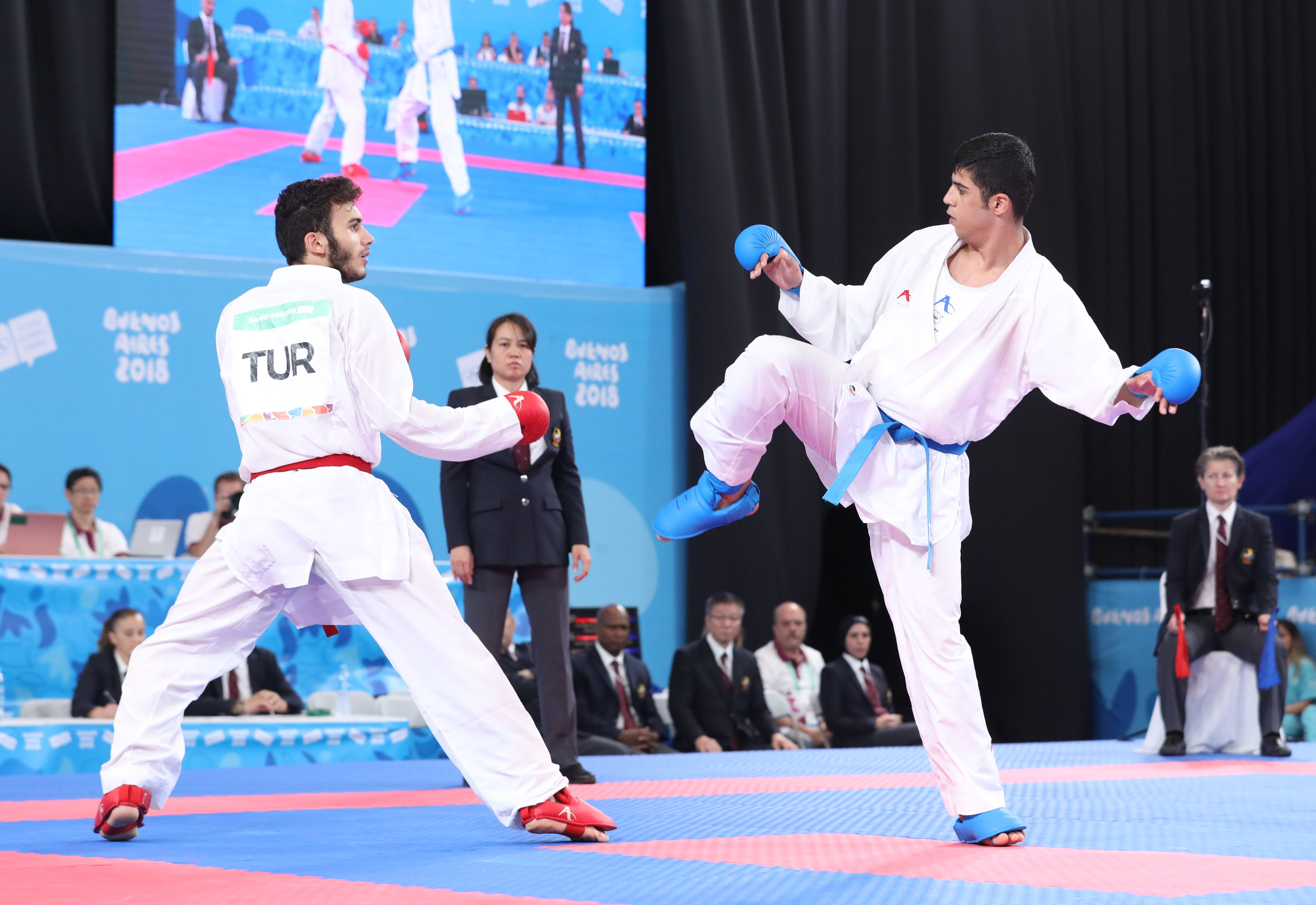
Enes Bulut versus Navid Mohammadi

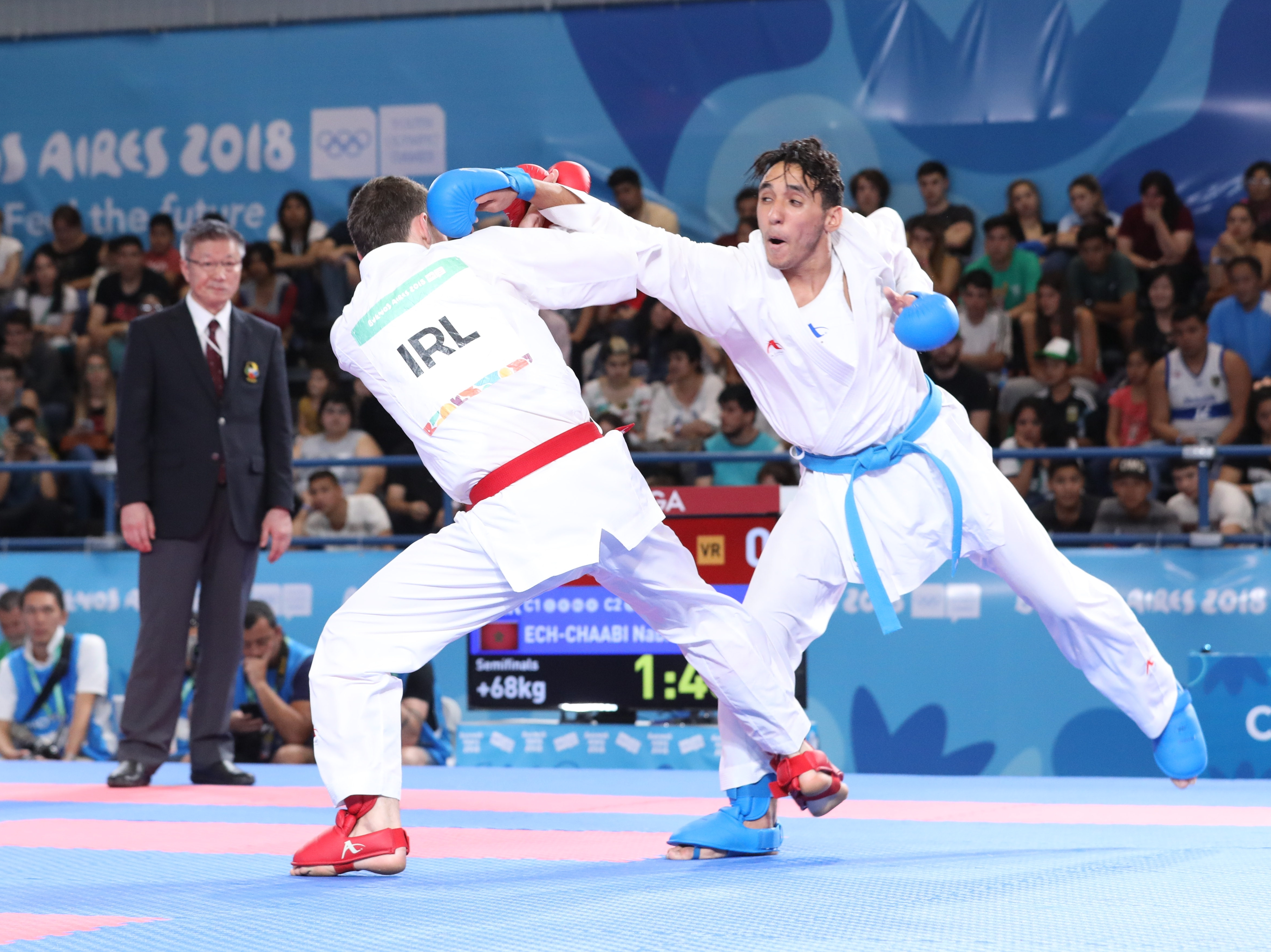
Sean McCarthy Crean versus Nabil Ech-Chaabi

=== Final ===
	Score	
Navid Mohammadi (IRI)	5–0	Nabil Ech-Chaabi (MAR)

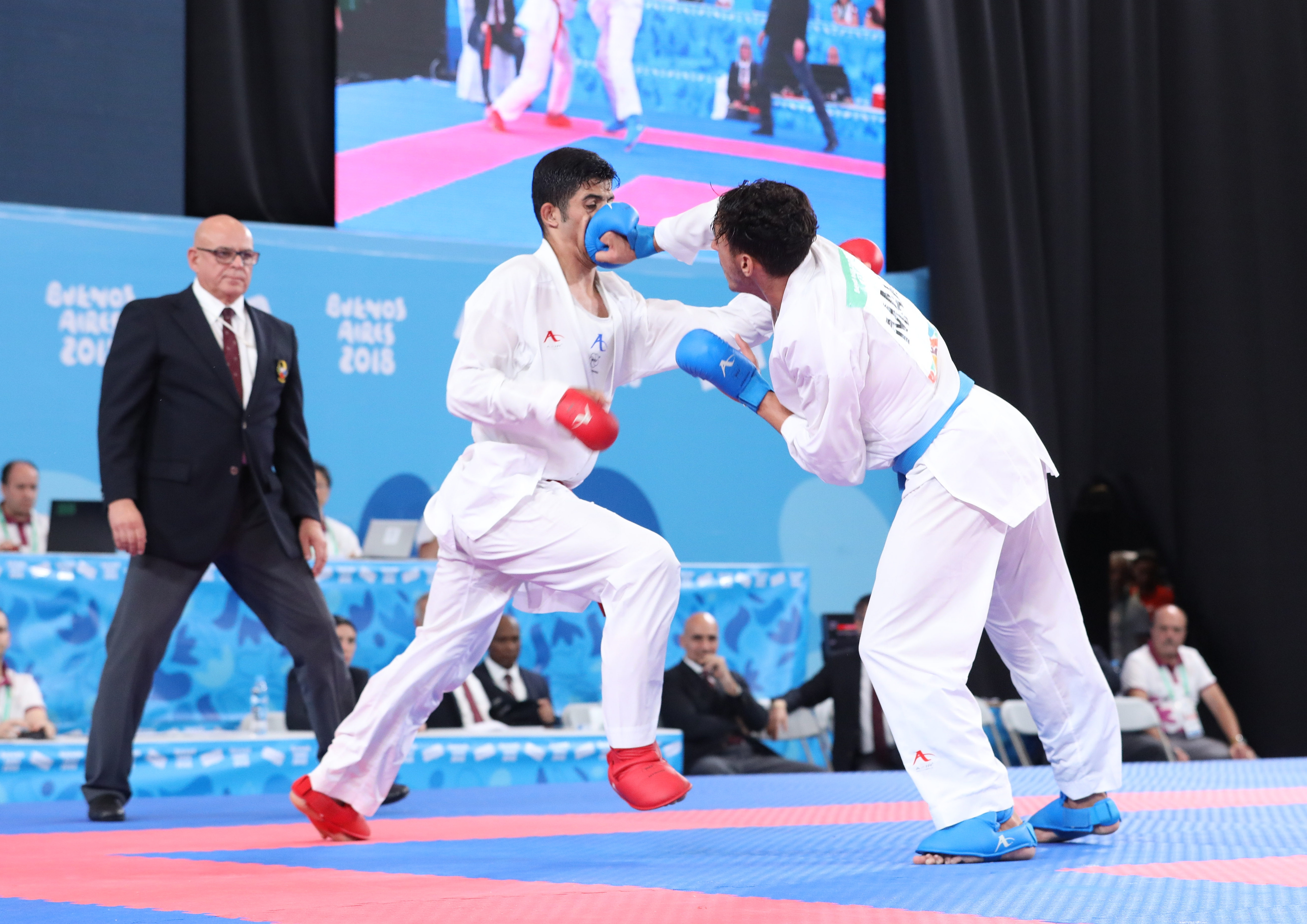
Navid Mohammadi versus Nabil Ech-Chaabi

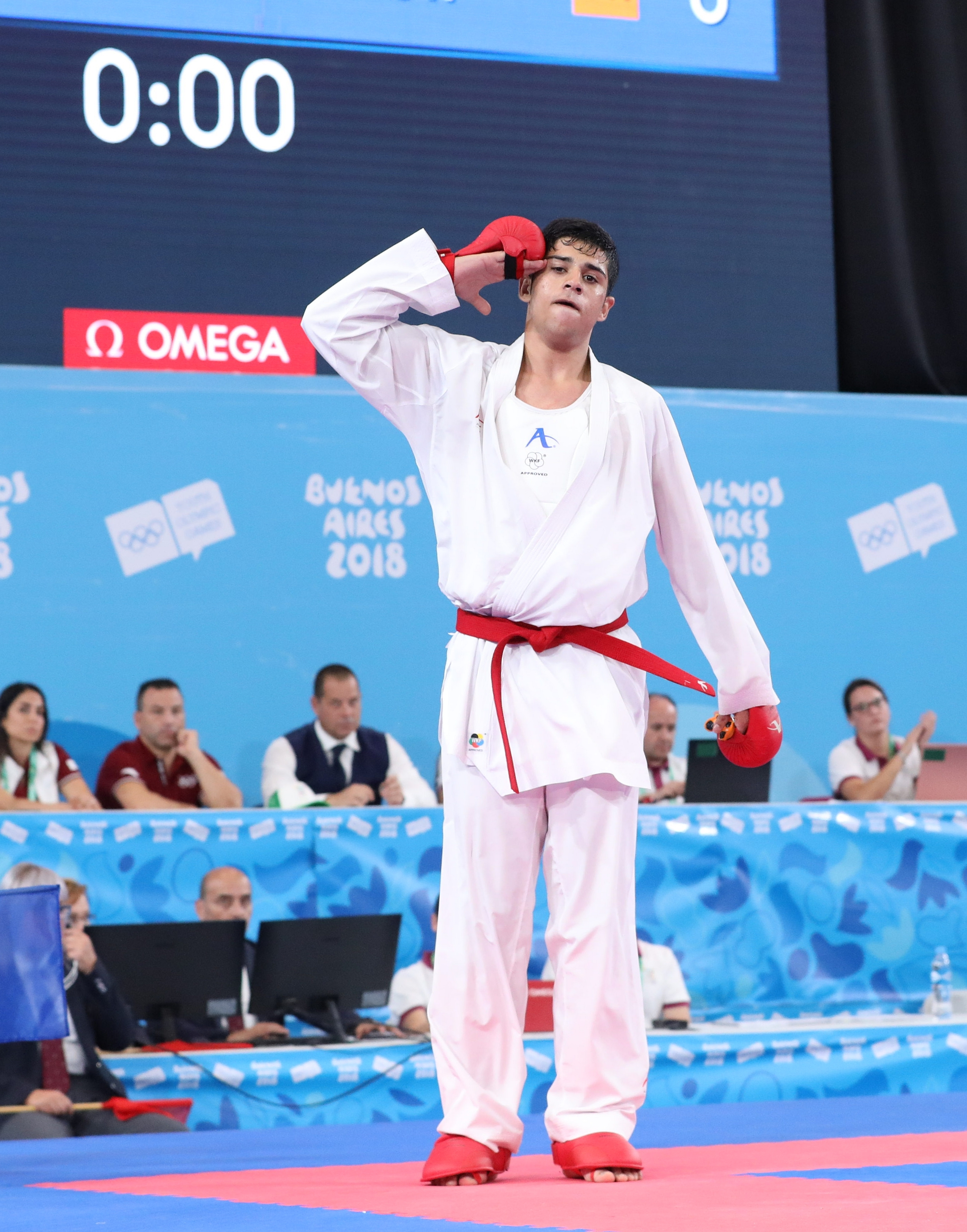
Navid Mohammadi saluting after his victory

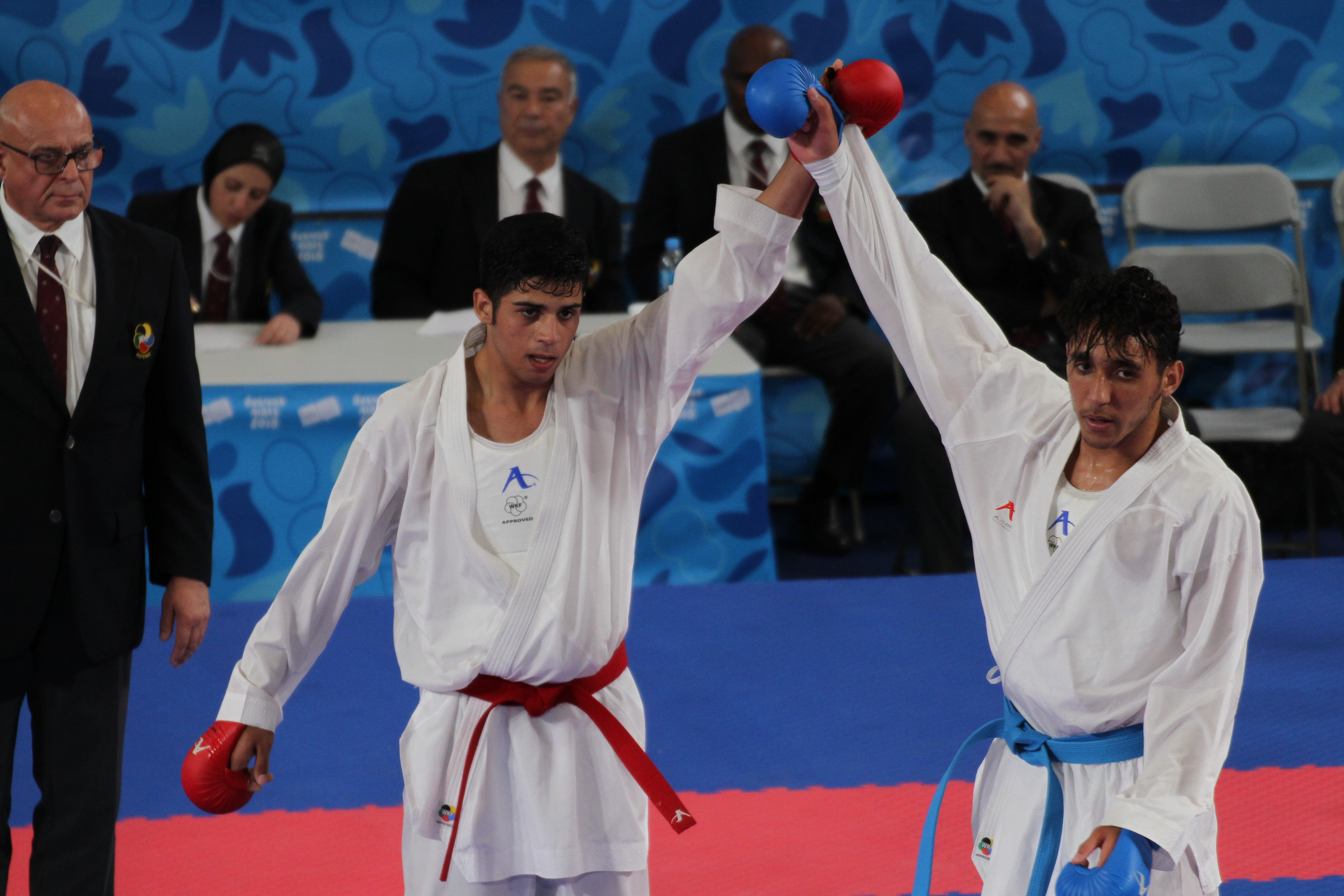
Nabil Ech-Chaabi celebrates Navid Mohammadi for his victory
