= Mohammad Al-Jafari =

Jordanian karateka (born 2004)

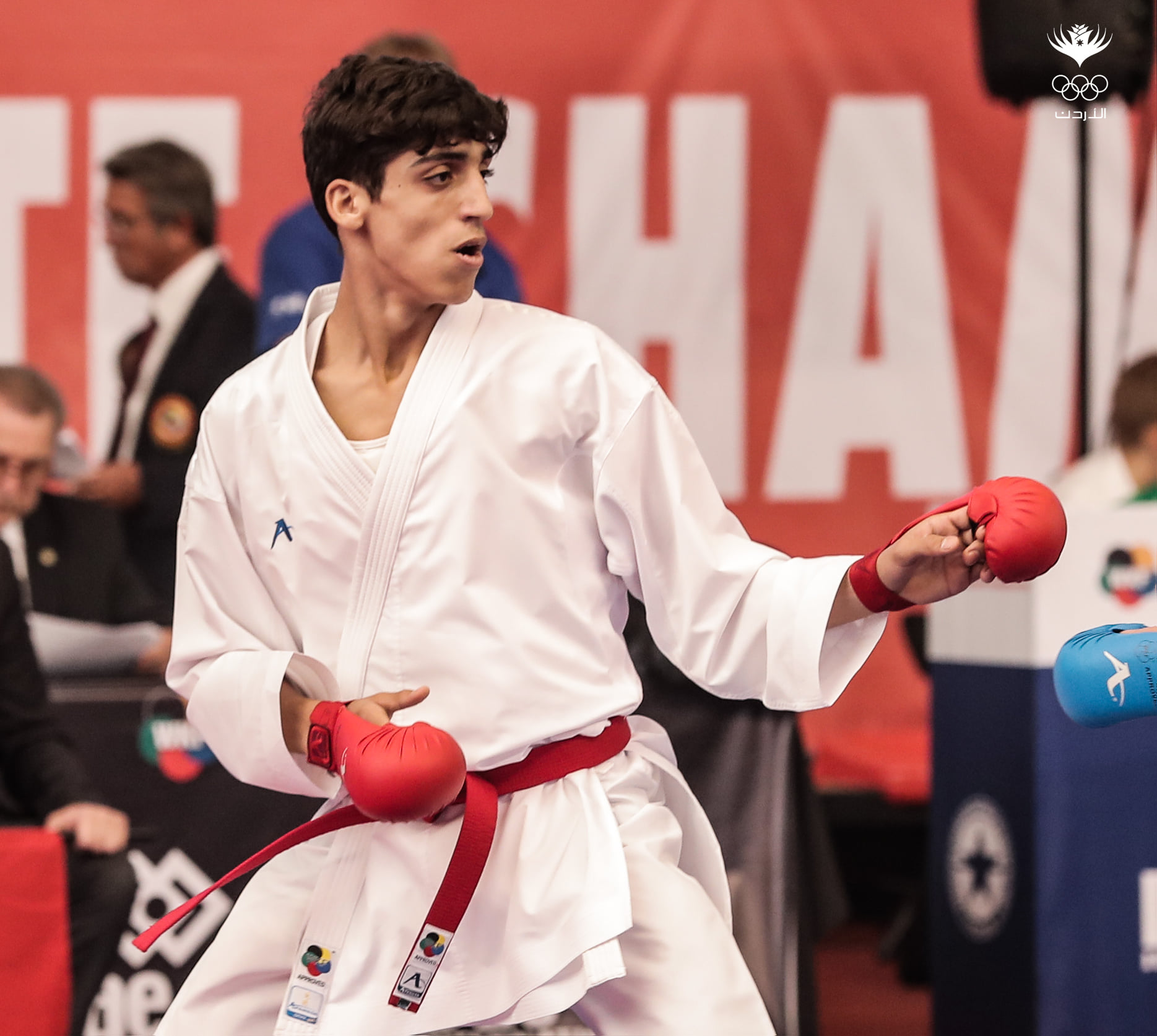

Personal information
- Born: 2 February 2004 (age 22)

Sport
- Country: Jordan
- Sport: Karate
- Weight class: 84 kg
- Event: Kumite
Medal record
Men's karate
Representing Jordan
World Games
Gold medal – first place	2025 Chengdu	Kumite 84 kg
World Championships
Gold medal – first place	2023 Budapest	Team kumite
Bronze medal – third place	2023 Budapest	Kumite 84 kg
Bronze medal – third place	2025 Cairo	Kumite 84 kg
Asian Games
Gold medal – first place	2026 Aichi–Nagoya	Kumite 84 kg
Bronze medal – third place	2022 Hangzhou	Kumite 84 kg
Asian Championships
Gold medal – first place	2026 Bali	Kumite 84 kg
Gold medal – first place	2026 Bali	Team kumite
Gold medal – first place	2025 Tashkent	Kumite 84 kg
Gold medal – first place	2025 Tashkent	Team kumite
Gold medal – first place	2023 Malacca	Kumite 84 kg
Gold medal – first place	2022 Tashkent	Kumite 84 kg
Bronze medal – third place	2024 Hangzhou	Kumite 84 kg
Bronze medal – third place	2024 Hangzhou	Team kumite
Bronze medal – third place	2023 Malacca	Team kumite
Bronze medal – third place	2022 Tashkent	Team kumite
Islamic Solidarity Games
Gold medal – first place	2021 Konya	Kumite 84 kg
Silver medal – second place	2025 Riyadh	Kumite 84 kg

Mohammad Faiq Mohammad Al-Jafari (born 2 February 2004) is a Jordanian karateka. He competes in the kumite 84 kg event and has won gold at the World Games, Asian Championships and Islamic Solidarity Games.

== Career ==
Al-Jafari won the gold medal in the men's 84 kg event at the 2021 Islamic Solidarity Games held in Konya, Turkey. He won the gold medal in this event at the 2022 Asian Karate Championships held in Tashkent, Uzbekistan.

In 2023, Al-Jafari won the gold medal in his event at the Asian Karate Championships held in Malacca, Malaysia. He also won one of the bronze medals in the men's team kumite event. Later that year, Al-Jafari won a bronze medal in the men's kumite 84 kg event at the 2022 Asian Games held in Hangzhou, China. He concluded the season with a bronze medal at the 2023 World Karate Championships held in Budapest, Hungary, and a gold medal for the kumite team event for the first time in Jordanian karate history.

Al-Masatfa won the gold medal in the men's kumite 84 kg event at the 2025 World Games held in Chengdu, China. He defeated Ivan Kvesić of Croatia in the gold medal match.

== Achievements ==
Year	Competition	Venue	Rank	Event
2022	Islamic Solidarity Games	Konya, Turkey	1st	Kumite 84 kg
2022	Asian Championships	Tashkent, Uzbekistan	1st	Kumite 84 kg
2022	Asian Championships	Tashkent, Uzbekistan	3rd	Team kumite
2023	Asian Championships	Malacca, Malaysia	1st	Kumite 84 kg
2023	Asian Championships	Malacca, Malaysia	3rd	Team kumite
2023	Asian Games	Hangzhou, China	3rd	Kumite 84 kg
2023	World Championships	Budapest, Hungary	3rd	Kumite 84 kg
2023	World Championships	Budapest, Hungary	1st	Team kumite
2024	Asian Championships	Hangzhou, China	3rd	Kumite 84 kg
2024	Asian Championships	Hangzhou, China	3rd	Team kumite
2025	Asian Championships	Tashkent, Uzbekistan	1st	Kumite 84 kg
2025	Asian Championships	Tashkent, Uzbekistan	1st	Team kumite
2025	World Games	Chengdu, China	1st	Kumite 84 kg
