= Kamran Madani =

American karateka (born 1996)

Personal information
- Born: September 9, 1996 (age 29) Boulder, Colorado, U.S.

Sport
- Country: United States
- Sport: Karate
- Weight class: 84 kg
- Event: Kumite
Medal record
Men's karate
Representing United States
Pan American Games
Gold medal – first place	2019 Lima	Kumite 84 kg
World Games
Bronze medal – third place	2022 Birmingham	Kumite 84 kg

Kamran Madani (born September 9, 1996) is an American karateka. In 2019, he won, at first, the silver medal in the men's kumite 84 kg event at the Pan American Games held in Lima, Peru. This became the gold medal after Carlos Sinisterra of Columbia was disqualified for doping violations.

== Career ==
In 2018, Madani won the gold medal in the men's kumite 84 kg event at the World University Karate Championships held in Kobe, Japan.

Madani won the bronze medal in the men's kumite 84 kg event at the 2022 World Games held in Birmingham, United States. He defeated Ivan Kvesić of Croatia in his bronze medal match.

== Achievements ==
Year	Competition	Location	Rank	Event
2019	Pan American Games	Lima, Peru	1st	Kumite 84 kg
2022	World Games	Birmingham, United States	3rd	Kumite 84 kg
