= Nabil Ech-Chaabi =

Moroccan karateka (born 2001)

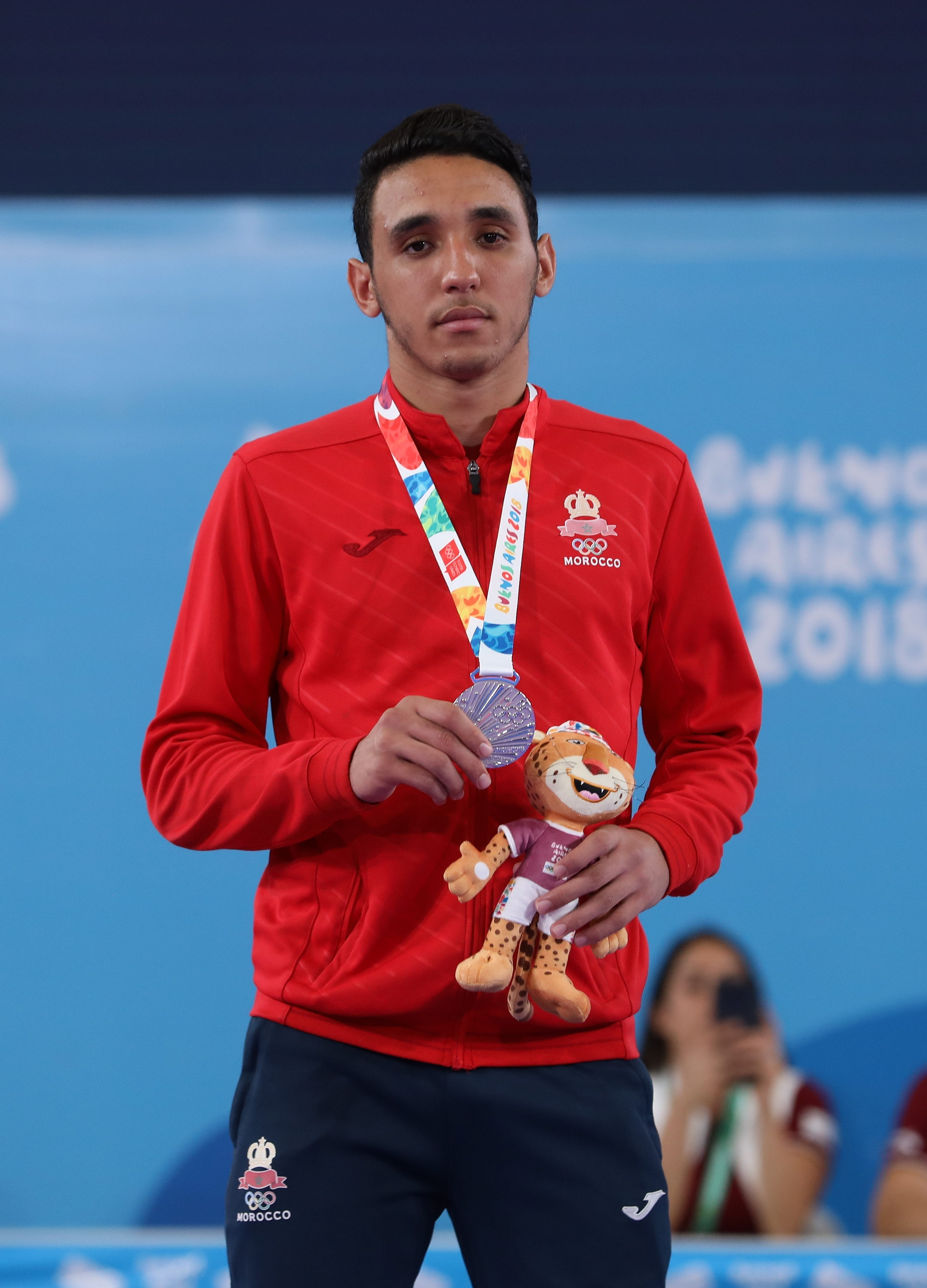
- Nabil Ech-Chaabi at the 2018 Summer Youth Olympics

Personal information
- Born: 4 June 2001 (age 25)

Sport
- Country: Morocco
- Sport: Karate
- Weight class: 84 kg
- Event: Kumite
Medal record
Men's karate
Representing Morocco
World Games
Silver medal – second place	2022 Birmingham	Kumite 84 kg
African Games
Silver medal – second place	2019 Rabat	Kumite 84 kg
Silver medal – second place	2019 Rabat	Team kumite
Islamic Solidarity Games
Bronze medal – third place	2021 Konya	Kumite 84 kg
Summer Youth Olympics
Silver medal – second place	2018 Buenos Aires	Kumite +68 kg

Nabil Ech-Chaabi, sometimes written Nabil Ech-chaabi (born 4 June 2001) is a Moroccan karateka. He won the silver medal in the men's kumite 84 kg event at the 2022 World Games held in Birmingham, United States. He won one of the bronze medals in the men's 84 kg event at the 2021 Islamic Solidarity Games held in Konya, Turkey.

== Career ==
In June 2018, he qualified for the 2018 Summer Youth Olympics at the qualification event held in Umag, Croatia. In October 2018, he won the silver medal in the boys' kumite +68 kg event at the Summer Youth Olympics held in Buenos Aires, Argentina. He represented Morocco at the 2019 African Games and he won the silver medal in the men's 84 kg event. He also won the silver medal in the men's team kumite event.

In June 2021, he competed at the World Olympic Qualification Tournament held in Paris, France hoping to qualify for the 2020 Summer Olympics in Tokyo, Japan. He was eliminated in his first match by Asiman Gurbanli of Azerbaijan. In November 2021, he lost his bronze medal match in the men's 84 kg event at the World Karate Championships held in Dubai, United Arab Emirates.

He competed in the men's 84 kg event at the 2022 Mediterranean Games held in Oran, Algeria. He won his first match and he then lost his next match against eventual gold medalist Youssef Badawy of Egypt. He was then eliminated in the repechage by eventual bronze medalist Uğur Aktaş of Turkey. He won the silver medal in the men's kumite 84 kg event at the 2022 World Games held in Birmingham, United States. In the final, he lost against Youssef Badawy of Egypt. He won one of the bronze medals in the men's 84 kg event at the 2021 Islamic Solidarity Games held in Konya, Turkey.

== Achievements ==
Year	Competition	Venue	Rank	Event
2019	African Games	Rabat, Morocco	2nd	Kumite 84 kg
2019	African Games	Rabat, Morocco	2nd	Team kumite
2022	World Games	Birmingham, United States	2nd	Kumite 84 kg
2022	Islamic Solidarity Games	Konya, Turkey	3rd	Kumite 84 kg
