= Jessie Da Costa =

French karateka (born 1997)

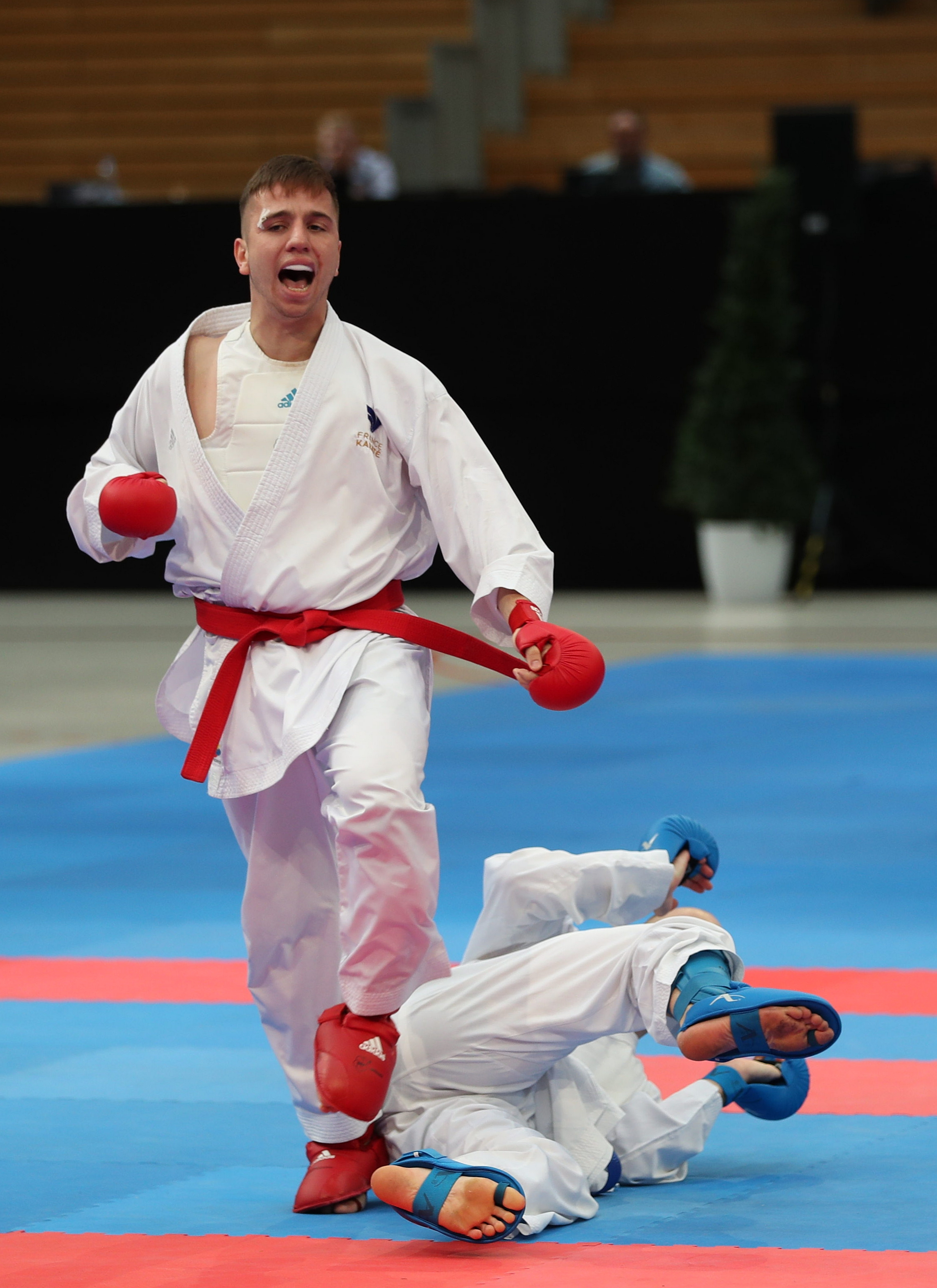
- Da Costa in 2018

Personal information
- Born: 23 January 1997 (age 29) Mont-Saint-Martin, France

Sport
- Country: France
- Sport: Karate
- Weight class: 84 kg
- Events: Kumite; Team kumite
Medal record
Men's karate
Representing France
World Championships
Bronze medal – third place	2016 Linz	Team kumite
Bronze medal – third place	2021 Dubai	Kumite 84 kg
Bronze medal – third place	2023 Budapest	Team kumite
European Championships
Gold medal – first place	2016 Montpellier	Team kumite
Gold medal – first place	2022 Gaziantep	Team kumite
Silver medal – second place	2017 İzmit	Team kumite
Silver medal – second place	2023 Guadalajara	Team kumite
Mediterranean Games
Silver medal – second place	2018 Tarragona	Kumite 84 kg

Jessie Da Costa (born 23 January 1997) is a French karateka. He won one of the bronze medals in the men's kumite 84 kg event at the 2021 World Karate Championships held in Dubai, United Arab Emirates. In 2018, he won the silver medal in the men's 84 kg event at the Mediterranean Games held in Tarragona, Spain.

== Career ==
In 2016, Da Costa won one of the bronze medals in the under-21 men's 84 kg event at the EKF Cadet, Junior and under-21 Championships held in Limassol, Cyprus. He won one of the bronze medals in his event at the 2016 World University Karate Championships held in Braga, Portugal.

Da Costa competed in the men's kumite 84 kg event at the 2022 World Games held in Birmingham, United States. He won the silver medal in the men's team kumite event at the 2023 European Karate Championships held in Guadalajara, Spain.

His brothers Logan Da Costa and Steven Da Costa also compete in karate.

== Personal life ==
He is of Portuguese descent.

== Achievements ==
Year	Competition	Venue	Rank	Event
2016	European Championships	Montpellier, France	1st	Team kumite
2016	World Championships	Linz, Austria	3rd	Team kumite
2017	European Championships	İzmit, Turkey	2nd	Team kumite
2018	Mediterranean Games	Tarragona, Spain	2nd	Kumite 84 kg
2021	World Championships	Dubai, United Arab Emirates	3rd	Kumite 84 kg
2022	European Championships	Gaziantep, Turkey	1st	Team kumite
2023	European Championships	Guadalajara, Spain	2nd	Team kumite
2023	World Championships	Budapest, Hungary	3rd	Team kumite
