= African Karate Federation =

Governing body of sport karate

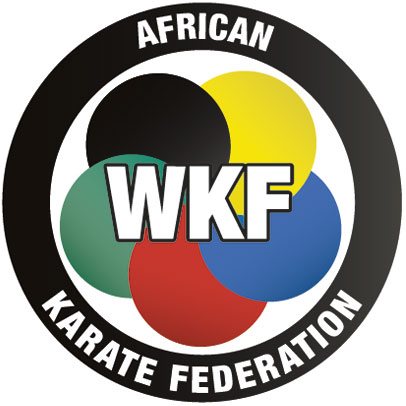
- Abbreviation: UFAK
- Formation: 30 June 1987; 39 years ago
- Legal status: Federation
- Headquarters: Headquarters of the UFAK is situated in the country/region the elected president resides.
- Location: Africa
- Region served: African continental countries/regions
- Members: 50 affiliated countries
- Official language: English is the official language. If any question in respect to the sport or technique of karate, it will be referred to the original Japanese text.
- President: Souleymane Gaye of Senegal
- Website: www.africakarate.com

The African Karate Federation (French: Union des Fédérations Africaines de Karaté (UFAK), English: Union of African Karate Federations) is the continental governing body of the sport karate in Africa. The UFAK is a non-governmental continental organisation. It has legal personality and financial autonomy. It is non-political, non-profit, non-denominational and cannot accept any racial or other discrimination and performs its activities on an amateur basis in compliance with the principles set forth in the Olympic Charter, duly recognised by the World Karate Federation (WKF), Association of African Sports Confederations (AASC), Association of National Olympic Committees of Africa (ANOCA).

== History ==
The African Karate Federation was created on June 30, 1987, in Dakar, Senegal. This continental institution is the result of the different African sport unions of karate created previously: African Union of Karate (UAK: 1978), the Confederation of African Karate Amateur (CAKA: 1980), the Union of Karate-Do Federations of Central Africa (UFKAC: 1980), the Arab Union of Karate (UAK: 1980).

The UFAK organises the African Championships, the Junior and Senior UFAK Championships every year, and participates in WKF World Karate Championships. The current president of the African Karate Federation is Mohamed Mesabahi Tahar from Algeria.

== Members ==
The African Karate Federation has 50 national federation members:

- Algeria
- Angola
- Benin
- Botswana
- Burkina Faso
- Burundi
- Cameroon
- Cape Verde
- Central African Republic
- Chad
- Comoros
- Congo
- Democratic Republic of the Congo
- Djibouti
- Egypt
- Equatorial Guinea
- Eswatini
- Ethiopia
- Gabon
- Gambia
- Ghana
- Guinea
- Ivory Coast
- Kenya
- Liberia
- Libya
- Madagascar
- Mali
- Mauritania
- Mauritius
- Morocco
- Mozambique
- Namibia
- Niger
- Nigeria
- Rwanda
- Sao Tome and Principe
- Senegal
- Seychelles
- Sierra Leone
- Somalia
- South Africa
- South Sudan
- Sudan
- Togo
- Tunisia
- Uganda
- Tanzania
- Zambia
- Zimbabwe

== Competitions ==
- African Karate Championships (Senior & Youth "Cadet, Junior & U-21")
- African Games
