= Ivan Kvesić =

Croatian karateka (born 1996)

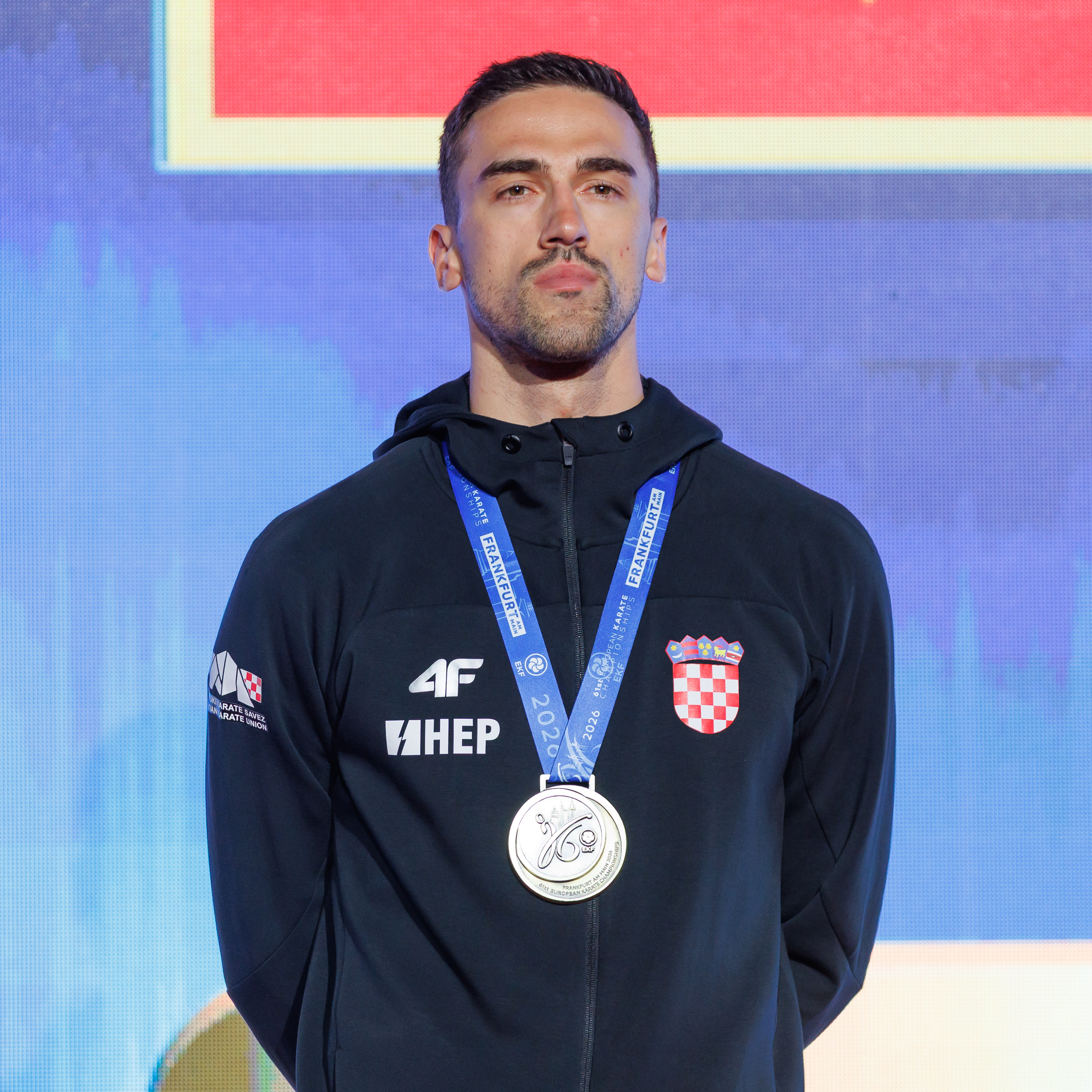

Personal information
- Born: 13 October 1996 (age 29) Široki Brijeg, Bosnia and Herzegovina

Sport
- Country: Croatia
- Sport: Karate
- Weight class: 84 kg
- Events: Kumite; Team kumite
Medal record
Men's karate
Representing Croatia
World Games
Silver medal – second place	2025 Chengdu	Kumite 84 kg
World Championships
Gold medal – first place	2018 Madrid	Kumite 84 kg
Bronze medal – third place	2025 Cairo	Kumite 84 kg
European Games
Gold medal – first place	2019 Minsk	Kumite 84 kg
European Championships
Gold medal – first place	2021 Poreč	Team kumite
Gold medal – first place	2025 Yerevan	Kumite 84 kg
Silver medal – second place	2018 Novi Sad	Kumite 84 kg
Silver medal – second place	2025 Yerevan	Team kumite
Bronze medal – third place	2017 İzmit	Team kumite
Bronze medal – third place	2019 Guadalajara	Kumite 84 kg
Bronze medal – third place	2019 Guadalajara	Team kumite
Bronze medal – third place	2023 Guadalajara	Team kumite
Bronze medal – third place	2024 Zadar	Kumite 84 kg
Bronze medal – third place	2026 Frankfurt	Kumite 84 kg
Mediterranean Games
Bronze medal – third place	2022 Oran	Kumite 84 kg

Ivan Kvesić (born 13 October 1996) is a Croatian karateka athlete who won a gold medal at the 2018 World Karate Championships held in Madrid, Spain. He represented Croatia at the 2020 Summer Olympics in Tokyo, Japan. He competed in the men's +75 kg event.

== Career ==
In 2019, Kvesić won the gold medal in the men's 84 kg event at the European Games held in Minsk, Belarus. He defeated Uğur Aktaş of Turkey in his gold medal match. In 2021, he lost his bronze medal match in the men's 84 kg event at the World Karate Championships held in Dubai, United Arab Emirates.

Kvesić won one of the bronze medals in the men's 84 kg event at the 2022 Mediterranean Games held in Oran, Algeria. He lost his bronze medal match in the men's kumite 84 kg event at the 2022 World Games held in Birmingham, United States.

Kvesić won one of the bronze medals in the men's team kumite event at the 2023 European Karate Championships held in Guadalajara, Spain. He won one of the bronze medals in the men's 84 kg event at the 2024 European Karate Championships held in Zadar, Croatia.

Kvesić won the gold medal in his event at the 2025 European Karate Championships held in Yerevan, Armenia. He defeated Valerii Chobotar of Ukraine in his gold medal match. He also won the silver medal in the men's team kumite event.

== Personal life ==
His brother Anđelo Kvesić also competes in karate.

== Achievements ==
Year	Competition	Location	Rank	Event
2017	European Championships	İzmit, Turkey	3rd	Team kumite
2018	European Championships	Novi Sad, Serbia	2nd	Kumite 84 kg
2018	World Championships	Madrid, Spain	1st	Kumite 84 kg
2019	European Championships	Guadalajara, Spain	3rd	Kumite 84 kg
2019	European Championships	Guadalajara, Spain	3rd	Team kumite
2019	European Games	Minsk, Belarus	1st	Kumite 84 kg
2021	European Championships	Poreč, Croatia	1st	Team kumite
2022	Mediterranean Games	Oran, Algeria	3rd	Kumite 84 kg
2023	European Championships	Guadalajara, Spain	3rd	Team kumite
2024	European Championships	Zadar, Croatia	3rd	Kumite 84 kg
2025	European Championships	Yerevan, Armenia	1st	Kumite 84 kg
2025	European Championships	Yerevan, Armenia	2nd	Team kumite
2025	World Games	Chengdu, China	2nd	Kumite 84 kg
