= Fabián Huaiquimán =

Chilean karateka (born 1998)

Personal information
- Full name: Fabian Brian Huaiquiman Saez
- Nickname: Huaiqui
- Born: 20 July 1998 (age 27) Santiago (Chile)
- Height: 186 cm (6 ft 1 in)

Sport
- Country: Chile
- Sport: Karate
- Weight class: -84 kg
- Event: Kumite
- Coached by: Ahmed solyman
Medal record
Men's karate
Representing Chile
World Championships
Silver medal – second place	2021 Dubai	Kumite -84 kg
Pan-American Championships
Gold medal – first place	Uruguay 2024	Kumite -84 kg
Bronze medal – third place	2019 Panama	Kumite -84 kg

Fabián Huaiquimán (born 20 July 1998) is a Chilean karateka. He won the silver medal in the men's kumite 84 kg event at the 2021 World Karate Championships held in Dubai, United Arab Emirates.

Huaiquimán competed in the men's kumite 84 kg event at the 2022 World Games held in Birmingham, United States.

He competed in the men's 84 kg event at the 2023 Pan American Games held in Santiago, Chile.
