= Valerii Chobotar =

Ukrainian karateka (born 1993)

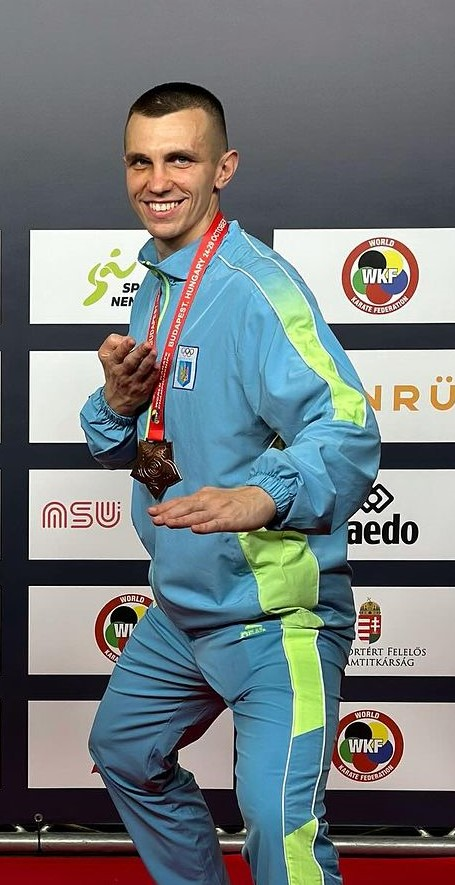
- Born: Чоботар Валерій Валерійович; 27 July 1993 (age 33); Chernivtsi, Ukraine
- Nationality: Ukrainian
- Style: Karate Kumite
- Team: "ЧОМГО Лідер", Chernivtsi

Valerii Chobotar (Ukrainian: Чоботар Валерій Валерійович, born 27 July 1993) is a Ukrainian karateka competing in the kumite 84 kg division. Valerii won silver medal at the 2018 Worlds in Madrid, Spain, and bronze medal at the 2023 Worlds in Budapest, Hungary. He is 2023 European champion and multiple medallist in team competitions.

In June 2021, he competed at the World Olympic Qualification Tournament held in Paris, France hoping to qualify for the 2020 Summer Olympics in Tokyo, Japan. In November 2021, he competed in the men's 84 kg event at the 2021 World Karate Championships held in Dubai, United Arab Emirates.

Chobotar coaches Andrii Zaplitnyi.
