= Netherlands at the 2022 World Games =

- IOC code: NED
- NOC: NOC*NSF

in Birmingham, United States 7 July 2022 – 17 July 2022
- Competitors: 80 (36 men and 44 women) in 17 sports
- Flag bearers: Denise Blankenzee; Laurens Leeuwenhoek
- Medals Ranked 21st: Gold 3 Silver 3 Bronze 4 Total 10

World Games appearances
- 1981; 1985; 1989; 1993; 1997; 2001; 2005; 2009; 2013; 2017; 2022; 2025

Netherlands competed at the 2022 World Games, held in Birmingham, United States, from 7 to 17 July 2022. Athletes representing the Netherlands won three gold medals, three silver medals and four bronze medals. The country finished in 21st place in the medal table.

== Medalists ==
Medal	Name	Sport	Event	Date
Gold	Noa Man	Parkour	Women's freestyle	11 July
Gold	Dick Jaspers	Cue sports	Men's three-cushion carom	17 July
Gold	Dutch korfball team: Barbara Brouwer Esther Cordus Terrenc Griemink Anouk Haars Fleur Hoek Jelmer Jonker Laurens Leeuwenhoek Jessica Lokhorst Alwin Out Daan Preuninger Harjan Visscher Sanne van der Werff Olav van Wijngaarden Brett Zuijdwegt	Korfball	Mixed tournament	17 July
Silver	Jody Beckers; Mike Schloesser	Archery	Mixed compound team	9 July
Silver	Noa Man	Parkour	Women's speedrun	10 July
Silver	Donny Donker	Ju-jitsu	Men's fighting 85 kg	15 July
Bronze	Boy Vogelzang	Ju-jitsu	Men's fighting 77 kg	15 July
Bronze	Ecco van der Veer	Ju-jitsu	Men's fighting 62 kg	16 July
Bronze	Mixed team	Tug of war	Mixed outdoor 580 kg	16 July
Bronze	Mixed team	Ju-jitsu	Mixed national team competition	16 July

== Competitors ==
The following is the list of number of competitors in the Games.

Sport	Men	Women	Total
Acrobatic gymnastics	0	3	3
Archery	1	3	4
Bowling	0	2	2
Canoe marathon	1	0	0
Canoe polo	8	8	16
Cue sports	1	0	0
Dancesport	1	0	1
Duathlon	3	3	6
Ju-jitsu	3	3	6
Karate	1	1	2
Kickboxing	0	1	1
Korfball	7	7	14
Orienteering	0	1	1
Parkour	0	1	1
Powerlifting	0	2	2
Trampoline gymnastics	1	0	1
Tug of war	9	9	18
Total	36	44	80

== Acrobatic gymnastics ==
Netherlands competed in acrobatic gymnastics.

== Archery ==
Netherlands competed in archery.

Compound

Athlete	Event	Ranking round		Round of 32	Round of 16	Quarterfinal	Semifinal	Final / BM	
Athlete	Event	Score	Seed	Opposition Score	Opposition Score	Opposition Score	Opposition Score	Opposition Score	Rank
Mike Schloesser	Men's compound	713	1	Bye	Kim (KOR); W 150–146	Verma (IND); L 149–149*	did not advance		
Jody Beckers	Women's compound	691	14	Becerra (MEX); L 137–147	did not advance				
Sanne de Laat	Women's compound	685	18	Van Kradenburg (RSA); W 143–142	López (COL); L 145–148	did not advance			
Jody Beckers; Mike Schloesser	Mixed compound	1044	6	Bye		United States (USA); W 158–154	Mexico (MEX); W 157–156	Colombia (COL); L 154–154*	2nd place, silver medalist(s)

Recurve

Athlete	Event	Qualification		Elimination 1	Elimination 2	Elimination 3	Elimination 4	Semifinal	Final / BM
Athlete	Event	Score	Rank	Opposition Result	Opposition Result	Opposition Result	Opposition Result	Opposition Result	Opposition Result
Gaby Schloesser	Women's recurve	331	71	Bye	Barankova (SVK); W 85–81	Nugent (USA); W 85–89	did not advance		

== Bowling ==
Netherlands competed in bowling.

Athlete	Event	Round of 32	Round of 16	Quarterfinal	Semifinal	Final / BM	
Athlete	Event	Opposition Score	Opposition Score	Opposition Score	Opposition Score	Opposition Score	Rank
Denise Blankenzee	Women's singles	Hui Fen New (SIN); W 2–0	Franco (COL); W 2–0	Wegner (SWE); L 2–0	did not advance		
Samantha Greiner	Women's singles	Ribguth (GER); L 2–0	did not advance				
Denise Blankenzee; Samantha Greiner	Women's doubles	n/a	France (FRA); W 2–1	Malaysia (MAS); L 0–2	did not advance		

== Canoe marathon ==
Netherlands competed in canoe marathon.

Athlete	Event	Qualification		Final	
Athlete	Event	Result	Rank	Result	Rank
Joep van Bakel	Men's Short distance	15:19.17	7	did not advance	
Joep van Bakel	Men's Standard distance	n/a		1:28:23.03	9

== Canoe polo ==
Netherlands competed in canoe polo.

== Cue sports ==
Netherlands won one gold medal in cue sports.

Athlete	Event	Round of 32	Round of 16	Quarterfinal	Semifinal	Final / BM	
Athlete	Event	Opposition Score	Opposition Score	Opposition Score	Opposition Score	Opposition Score	Rank
Dick Jaspers	Men's 3-cushion carom	Piedrabuena (USA); W 40–11	Blomdahl (SWE); W 40–20	Piedrabuena (USA); W 40–11	Merckx (BEL); W 40–16	Garcia (COL); W 40-18	1st place, gold medalist(s)

== Dancesport ==
Netherlands competed in dancesport (breaking).

== Duathlon ==
Netherlands competed in duathlon.

== Ju-jitsu ==
Netherlands won several medals in ju-jitsu.

Athlete	Event	Group Stage			Semifinal	Final / BM	
Athlete	Event	Opposition Score	Opposition Score	Rank	Opposition Score	Opposition Score	Rank
Boy Vogelzang	Men's fighting 77 kg	Andersen (DEN); L 0 - 14	Kunsa (FRA); W 0* - 0	2	Attenberger (GER); L 6 - 9	Ochoa (MEX); W 14 - 0	3rd place, bronze medalist(s)
Donny Donker	Men's fighting 85 kg	Milić (MNE); W 13 - 7	Trajković (SRB); L 4 - 11	2	Zmeev (GER); L 9 - 11	Wei (TPE); W 9 - 6	3rd place, bronze medalist(s)
Genevieve Bogers	Women's fighting 57 kg	Singchalad (THA); W 11 - 2	Dahl (DEN); W 14 - 7	1	Koutoulaki (GRE); L 10 - 16	Dahl (DEN); L 6 - 6*	4

== Karate ==
Netherlands competed in karate.

Men

Athlete	Event	Elimination round			Semifinal	Final / BM	
Athlete	Event	Opposition Result	Opposition Result	Rank	Opposition Result	Opposition Result	Rank
Brian Timmermans	Men's kumite 84 kg	Ech-chaabi (MAR); L 2–3	Badawy (EGY); L 0–1	3	Did not advance		5

Women

Athlete	Event	Elimination round				Semifinal	Final / BM	
Athlete	Event	Opposition Result	Opposition Result	Opposition Result	Rank	Opposition Result	Opposition Result	Rank
Lynn Snel	Women's kumite 61 kg	Ali (EGY); D 2–2	Klinepeter (USA); W 9–0	Serogina (UKR); L 1–3	3	Did not advance		5

== Kickboxing ==
Netherlands competed in kickboxing.

Athlete	Category	Quarterfinals	Semifinals	Final/Bronze medal bout	
Athlete	Category	Opposition Result	Opposition Result	Opposition Result	Rank
Dajenka Meijer	Women's 70 kg	Ginski (USA); W 2–1	Filipová (SVK); L 1–2	Vanhakoski (FIN); L 0–3	4

== Korfball ==
Netherlands won the gold medal in the korfball tournament.

== Orienteering ==
Netherlands competed in orienteering.

== Parkour ==
Netherlands won two medals in parkour.

Athlete	Event	Qualification		Final	
Athlete	Event	Result	Rank	Result	Rank
Noa Man	Women's speedrun	30.60	2	29.24	2nd place, silver medalist(s)
Noa Man	Women's freestyle	23.5	1	24.0	1st place, gold medalist(s)

== Powerlifting ==
Netherlands competed in powerlifting.

Athlete	Event	Exercises			Total weight	Total points	Rank
Athlete	Event	Squat	Bench press	Deadlift	Total weight	Total points	Rank
Ielja Strik	Women's super heavyweight	230.0	—	200.0	—	—	DSQ
Ankie Timmers	Women's super heavyweight	237.5	185.0	220.0	642.5	101.65	4

== Trampoline gymnastics ==
Netherlands competed in trampoline gymnastics.

Athlete	Event	Qualification		Final	
Athlete	Event	Result	Rank	Result	Rank
Daniel Abrahams	Men's double mini-trampoline	23.200	10	did not advance	

== Tug of war ==
Netherlands won one bronze medal in tug of war.
