= Philippines at the 2022 World Games =

- IOC code: PHI
- NOC: Philippine Olympic Committee

in Birmingham, United States July 7 – 17, 2022
- Competitors: 7 in 5 sports
- Flag bearer: Joyce Reboton
- Medals Ranked 47th: Gold 1 Silver 0 Bronze 0 Total 1

World Games appearances (overview)
- 1981; 1985; 1989; 1993; 1997; 2001; 2005; 2009; 2013; 2017; 2022; 2025

The Philippines competed at the 2022 World Games in Birmingham, United States, from July 7 to 17, 2022. Athletes representing the Philippines won one gold medal and the country finished in 47th place in the medal table.

The delegation's chef de mission is Patrick Gregorio.

== Medalists ==
Medal	Name	Sport	Event	Date
Gold	Junna Tsukii	Karate	Women's kumite 50 kg	July 8

== Competitors ==
Sport	Men	Women	Total	Events
Cue sports	1	1	2	2
Karate	0	1	1	1
Ju-jitsu	0	1	1	1
Muaythai	1	1	2	2
Powerlifting	0	1	1	1
Total	2	5	7	7

== Cue sports ==
Carlo Biado and Rubilen Amit represented the Philippines in cue sport. Biado is the Philippines' first-ever gold medalist winning his event back in the 2017 edition. However he failed to repeat his feat after losing to Joshua Filler of Germany in the semifinal. In the battle for bronze he lost to Aloysius Yapp of Singapore. Amit ended her bid in the quarterfinals losing to Veronika Ivanovskaia of Germany in the quarterfinals.

Athlete	Event	Round of 16	Quarterfinals	Semifinals	Final / BM	
Athlete	Event	Opposition Result	Opposition Result	Opposition Result	Opposition Result	Rank
Carlo Biado	Nine-ball – men's singles	Zieliński (POL); W 11–10	Ouschan (AUT); W 11–7	Filler (GER); L 8–11	Yapp (SGP); L 8–11	4
Rubilen Amit	Nine-ball – women's singles	Filler (GER); W 9–8	Ivanovskaia (GER); L 8–9	Did not advance		

== Duathlon ==
Fernando Caseres and Kim Mangrobang were the Philippines representatives in duathlon. John Chicano was also due to qualify but was unable to compete due to visa issues. Duathlon is an invitational sport.

Caseres finished 14th in the men's event while Mangrobang was one of the eleven competitors who got disqualified in the women's event which Philippine national coach Ani de Leon-Brown attribute to poor officiating.

Individual

Athlete	Event	Run (10 km)	Trans 1	Bike (40 km)	Trans 2	Run (5 km)	Total Time	Rank
Fernando Caseres	Men's	33:01	0:20	1:02:40	0:23	17:33	1:53:57	14
Kim Mangrobang	Women's	Disqualified						

Team

Athlete	Event	Run (2 km)	Trans 1	Bike (6 km)	Trans 2	Run (1 km)	Leg time	Total Time	Rank
Fernando Caseres	Mixed	5:41	0:18	9:37	0:19	2:36	18:31	1:23:20	19
Kim Mangrobang	Mixed	7:32	0:17	10:57	0:20	3:03	22:09	1:23:20	19
Fernando Caseres	Mixed	6:46	0:17	9:43	0:21	2:28	19:35	1:23:20	19
Kim Mangrobang	Mixed	7:38	0:17	10:27	0:22	4:21	23:05	1:23:20	19

== Ju-jitsu ==
Annie Ramirez is the sole ju-jitsu representative of the Philippines. Ramirez's injury on her right knee, which she sustained in 2021 returned during her semifinal match against Galina Duvanova of Kazakhstan. She drew Duvanova 2–2 but her opponent advanced due to a submission attempt advantage. In the bronze medal match she lost to Laurence Fouillat.

Athlete	Event	Group stage			Semifinals	Final (Bronze Medal Match)	
Athlete	Event	Opposition Result	Opposition Result	Rank	Opposition Result	Opposition Result	Rank
Annie Ramirez	Women's Ne-waza 57 kg	Fouillat (FRA); W 3–0	Matan (USA); W 14–0	1 q	Duvanova (KAZ); L 2–2	Fouillat (FRA); L 0–14	4

== Karate ==
Junna Tsukii is the lone competitor for the Philippines in karate. Competing in the women's kumite 50 kg event, Tsukii lost to Yorgelis Salazar of Venezuela in her first pool stage match. She won her second tie against Shara Hubrich of Germany. She drew with Gema Morales Ozuna of Spain, but the match is considered a loss since her opponent was awarded the senshu. Tsukii tied with all of her opponents save for Salazar with a 1-2 win-loss records, but she advanced to the semifinals on points. She overcame Miho Miyahara of Japan in the semifinal and clinched the gold by winning the final against Salazar. Tsukii is the first ever competitor to win a gold medal in karate for the Philippines in the World Games.

Kumite

Athlete	Event	Group stage				Semifinals	Final	
Athlete	Event	Opposition Result	Opposition Result	Opposition Result	Rank	Opposition Result	Opposition Result	Rank
Junna Tsukii	Women's 50 kg	Salazar (VEN); L 1–8	Hubrich (GER); W 6–4	Morales (ESP); L 3–3	2 Q	Miyahara (JPN); W 4–3	Salazar (VEN); W 2–0	1st place, gold medalist(s)

== Muaythai ==
The Philippines entered two competitors for muaythai. Philip Delarmino qualified by winning a gold in the 2021 World Muaythai Championships. Leeana Bade is the other competitor. However both ended their medal bid in the quarterfinal round.

Athlete	Event	Quarterfinals	Semifinals	Final	
Athlete	Event	Opposition Result	Opposition Result	Opposition Result	Rank
Phillip Delarmino	Men's 67 kg	Mykytas (UKR); L 28–30	Did not advance		
Leeana Bade	Women's 63.5 kg	Wankrue (THA); L 28–29	Did not advance		

== Powerlifting ==
Joyce Reboton is the sole representative of the Philippines in powerlifting. She earned her berth by clinching four gold medals at the 2021 Asian Classic-Equipped Powerlifting and Bench Press Championships in Istanbul, Turkey. She finished ninth overall among twelve competitors in the women's heavyweight event.

Athlete	Event	Squat	Bench press	Deadlift	Total weight	Total points	Rank
Joyce Reboton	Women's heavyweight	242.5	147.5	212.5	602.5	99.16	9
