= Track speed skating at the 2022 World Games – Women's 500 m sprint =

Women's 500 m sprint at the 2022 World Games
- Venue: Birmingham CrossPlex, Birmingham, United States
- Date: 8 July 2022
- Competitors: 15 from 15 nations

Medalists
gold medal	(Germany) Laethisia Schimek
silver medal	None awarded
bronze medal	None awarded

The women's 500 m sprint competition in track speed skating at the 2022 World Games took place on 8 July 2022 at the Birmingham CrossPlex in Birmingham, United States.

== Competition format ==
A total of 15 athletes entered the competition. Eight fastest athletes from preliminary round advances to the semifinal. Best two athletes in each semifinal advances to the final.

== Results ==
=== Preliminary round ===
Heat 1

Rank	Name	Country	Time	Notes
1	Chen Ying-chu	Chinese Taipei	46.028	Q
2	Geiny Pájaro	Colombia	46.141	Q
3	Carolina Huerta	Mexico	47.312	

Heat 3

Rank	Name	Country	Time	Notes
1	Nerea Langa	Spain	46.624	Q
2	Mathilde Pedronno	France	46.640	
3	Solymar Vivas	Venezuela	46.805	
4	Varsha Sriramakrishna Puranik	India	46.990	

Heat 2

Rank	Name	Country	Time	Notes
1	Laethisia Schimek	Germany	46.038	Q
2	María Moya	Chile	46.152	Q
3	Jazzmyn Foster	United States	46.868	
4	Adriana Cantillo	Cuba	52.368	

Heat 4

Rank	Name	Country	Time	Notes
1	Asja Varani	Italy	46.189	Q
2	Idalis de León	Guatemala	46.322	Q
3	Micaela Siri	Argentina	46.401	Q
4	Karinne Tam	Hong Kong	49.324	

=== Semifinals ===
Heat 1

Rank	Name	Country	Time	Notes
1	Asja Varani	Italy	46.783	Q
2	Chen Ying-chu	Chinese Taipei	46.888	Q
3	Nerea Langa	Spain	47.067	
4	María Moya	Chile	47.343	

Heat 2

Rank	Name	Country	Time	Notes
1	Geiny Pájaro	Colombia	47.122	Q
2	Laethisia Schimek	Germany	47.336	Q
3	Micaela Siri	Argentina	47.412	
	Idalis de León	Guatemala	DSQ	

=== Final ===
Rank	Name	Country	Time
1st place, gold medalist(s)	Laethisia Schimek	Germany	46.992
	Geiny Pájaro	Colombia	DSQ
	Asja Varani	Italy	DSQ
	Chen Ying-chu	Chinese Taipei	DSQ
