= Spain at the 2022 World Games =

- IOC code: ESP
- NOC: National Olympic Committee of Spain

in Birmingham, Alabama, U.S.
- Competitors: 57 in 17 sports
- Medals Ranked 12th: Gold 6 Silver 6 Bronze 7 Total 19

World Games appearances
- 1981; 1985; 1989; 1993; 1997; 2001; 2005; 2009; 2013; 2017; 2022; 2025

Spain competed in the 2022 World Games in Birmingham, United States from 7 to 17 July 2022. The games were originally scheduled for July 2021, but were postponed due to the rescheduling of the Tokyo 2020 Olympic Games. Athletes representing Spain won six gold medals, six silver medals and seven bronze medals. The country finished in 12th place in the medal table.

== Medalists ==
The following competitors won medals at the Games for the Spain:

| Medal | Name | Sport | Event | Date |
|---|---|---|---|---|
| Gold | Sandra Sánchez | Karate | Women's kata | 8 July |
| Gold | Babacar Seck | Karate | Men's kumite +84 kg | 9 July |
| Gold | Nerea Langa | Speed Skating Road | Women's 1 Lap | 11 July |
| Gold | David Franco | Trampoline gymnastics | Men's double mini-trampoline | 15 July |
| Gold | Pau Garcia Domec | Artistic roller skating | Men's singles | 17 July |
| Gold | Melania Rodriguez | Trampoline gymnastics | Women's double mini-trampoline | 17 July |
| Silver | Damián Quintero | Karate | Men's kata | 8 July |
| Silver | María Torres | Karate | Women's kumite +68 kg | 9 July |
| Silver | Antía García | Life Saving | Women's 100m Manikin Carry with Fins | 10 July |
| Silver | Francisco Javier Catala | Life Saving | Men's 100m Manikin Tow with Fins | 11 July |
| Silver | Eva Barrios | Canoe Marathon | Women's K1 Short Distance | 11 July |
| Silver | Andrea Silva Pascual | Artistic roller skating | Women's singles | 17 July |
| Bronze | Alejandro Zamora | Drone Racing | Drone Racing | 10 July |
| Bronze | Albertor Turrado | Life Saving | Men's 100m Manikin Tow with Fins | 11 July |
| Bronze | Francisco Peula | Speed Skating Road | Men's Elimination Race 15.000m | 11 July |
| Bronze | Eva Barrios | Canoe Marathon | Women's K1 Standard Distance | 12 July |
| Bronze | Ivan Alonso | Canoe Marathon | Men's K1 Standard Distance | 12 July |
| Bronze | Carla Escrich | Artistic roller skating | Women's singles | 17 July |
| Bronze | Men's team | Canoe polo | Men's tournament | 17 July |

== Competitors ==
| Sports | Men | Women | Total | Events |
|---|---|---|---|---|
| Acrobatic Gymnastic | 1 | 1 | 2 | 1 |
| Air Sports | 2 | 0 | 2 | 2 |
| Archery | 2 | 2 | 4 | 4 |
| Artistic Roller Skating | 1 | 2 | 3 | 3 |
| Billiards Sport | 2 | 0 | 2 | 2 |
| Canoe Marathon | 1 | 1 | 2 | 4 |
| Canoe Polo | 8 | 0 | 8 | 1 |
| Dance Sport | 3 | 1 | 4 | 3 |
| Karate | 3 | 2 | 5 | 5 |
| Life Saving | 7 | 7 | 14 | 16 |
| MuayThai | 1 | 1 | 2 | 2 |
| Parkour | 1 | 0 | 1 | 2 |
| Rhythmic Gymnastics | 0 | 1 | 1 | 4 |
| Speed Skating Road | 1 | 1 | 2 | 9 |
| Squash | 1 | 0 | 1 | 1 |
| Trampoline Gymnastics | 1 | 1 | 2 | 2 |
| Waterski & Wakeboard | 2 | 0 | 2 | 2 |
| Total | 37 | 20 | 57 | 63 |

== Acrobatic gymnastics ==
=== Mixed ===
| Athlete | Event | Qualifications | | Final | |
| Athlete | Event | Points | Rank | Points | Rank |
|---|---|---|---|---|---|
| Javier Martínez; Noa Murcia | Mixed pair | | | | |

== Air sports ==
Spain qualified one pilot in drone racing at the World Games, as a result of the FAI The World Games 2022 men Selection List.

Drone Racing

| Athlete | Event | Classification | | Round 1 | | Round 2 | | Semifinals | | Finals | |
| Athlete | Event | Result | Rank | Result | Rank | Result | Rank | Result | Rank | Result | Rank |
|---|---|---|---|---|---|---|---|---|---|---|---|
| Alejandro Zamora Cabañas | Drone racing | | | | | | | | | | |

Parachute

| Athlete | Event | Jump | | | | | | | | | | | | Total | |
| Athlete | Event | 1 | 2 | 3 | 4 | 5 | 6 | 7 | 8 | 9 | 10 | 11 | 12 | Net points | Rank |
|---|---|---|---|---|---|---|---|---|---|---|---|---|---|---|---|
| Pablo Hernández | Canopy piloting | | | | | | | | | | | | | | |

== Archery ==
Compound

| Athlete | Event | Ranking round | | Round of 32 | Round of 16 | Quarterfinal | Semifinal | Final / BM | |
| Athlete | Event | Score | Seed | Opposition Result | Opposition Result | Opposition Result | Opposition Result | Opposition Result | Rank |
|---|---|---|---|---|---|---|---|---|---|
| Andrea Muñoz | Women's individual | | | | | | | | |

Recurve/Barebow

| Athlete | Event | Ranking round | | Elimination round | | | | Semifinal | Final / BM | |
| Athlete | Event | Score | Seed | Opposition Result | Opposition Result | Opposition Result | Opposition Result | Opposition Result | Opposition Result | Rank |
|---|---|---|---|---|---|---|---|---|---|---|
| David Garcia Fernández | Men's barebow | | | | | | | | | |
| Carlos Iglesias | Men's recurve | | | | | | | | | |
| Ana Maria Cano | Women's barebow | | | | | | | | | |

== Artistic roller skating ==
Spain has qualified to the games 1 male and 2 female.

Artistic roller skating

| Athlete | Event | Short program | | Long program | |
| Athlete | Event | Score | Rank | Score | Rank |
|---|---|---|---|---|---|
| Pau García Domec | Men's singles | | | | |
| Andrea Silva Pascual | Women's singles | | | | |
| Carla Escrich | Women's singles | | | | |

== Billiards sports ==
Spain qualified two athlete to compete at the games.

| Athlete | Event | Qualifying | | Semifinals | Consolation / Final | |
| Athlete | Event | Opposition Result | Rank | Opposition Result | Opposition Result | Rank |
|---|---|---|---|---|---|---|
| Dani Sánchez | 3-cushion billiards men's singles | | | | | |
| Francisco Sánchez Ruiz | 9-Ball billiards men's singles | | | | | |

== Canoe marathon ==
Spain competed in canoe marathon.

Men

| Athlete | Event | Heats | | Semifinals | | Finals | |
| Athlete | Event | Time | Rank | Time | Rank | Time | Rank |
|---|---|---|---|---|---|---|---|
| Iván Alonso Lage | Men's K1 Short Distance | | | | | | |
| Iván Alonso Lage | Men's K1 Standard Distance | | | | | | |

Women

| Athlete | Event | Heats | | Semifinals | | Finals | |
| Athlete | Event | Time | Rank | Time | Rank | Time | Rank |
|---|---|---|---|---|---|---|---|
| Eva Barrios Marcos | Women's K1 Short Distance | | | | | | |
| Eva Barrios Marcos | Women's K1 Standard Distance | | | | | | |

== Canoe polo ==
Spain has qualified at the 2022 World Games:

- Men's Team Event - 1 quote place

=== Men's tournament ===
Team roster

- Alejandro Casal
- Alejandro Gordo
- Alejandro Valls
- Ángel Gordo
- Javier Arego
- Iván Hoyo
- Samuel Pardavila
- Sergio Corbella

== Dance sports ==
Breaking

| Athlete | Event | Preliminary | | | | Quarterfinals | Semifinals | Final / BB | |
| Athlete | Event | Opposition Score | Opposition Score | Opposition Score | Rank | Opposition Score | Opposition Score | Opposition Score | Rank |
|---|---|---|---|---|---|---|---|---|---|
| B-Boy Xak | Individual Men | | | | | | | | |
| B-Boy Johnny Fox | Individual Men | | | | | | | | |

Latin

| Athlete | Event | First round | | Redance | | Semifinals | | Final |
| Athlete | Event | Points | Rank | Points | Rank | Opponent Score | Opponent Score | Rank |
|---|---|---|---|---|---|---|---|---|
| Adria Martos; Juline Carrel | Couple | | | | | | | |

== Karate ==
Spain competed in karate.

=== Men ===
| Athlete | Event | Pool | | | | Semifinals | Final / BM | |
| Athlete | Event | Opposition Score | Opposition Score | Opposition Score | Rank | Opposition Score | Opposition Score | Rank |
|---|---|---|---|---|---|---|---|---|
| Damián Quintero | Men's kata | Díaz (VEN); W 25.54—24.48 | Ujihara (SUI); W 25.80—24.66 | Busato (ITA); W 26.08—25.12 | 1 Q | Tozaki (USA); W 26.26—25.86 | Moto (JPN); L 26.26—26.60 | 2nd place, silver medalist(s) |
| Babacar Seck | Men's kumite +84 kg | —N/a | Gurbanli (AZE); W 8–3 | Talibov (UKR); W 2–1 | 1 Q | Tarek (EGY); W 1—1 | Kvesić (CRO); W 1–0 | 1st place, gold medalist(s) |

=== Women ===
| Athlete | Event | Pool | | | | Semifinals | Final / BM | |
| Athlete | Event | Opposition Score | Opposition Score | Opposition Score | Rank | Opposition Score | Opposition Score | Rank |
|---|---|---|---|---|---|---|---|---|
| Sandra Sánchez | Women's Kata | Anacan (NZL); W 25.74—23.54 | Jüttner (GER); W 26.06—24.34 | Casale (ITA); W 26.40—25.00 | 1 Q | Lau (HKG); W 26.92—25.66 | Ono (JPN); W 27.92—27.00 | 1st place, gold medalist(s) |
| Gema Morales | Women's kumite 50 kg | Hubrich (GER); L 1–3 | Salazar (VEN); L 1–4 | Tsukii (PHI); W 3—3 | 4 | Did not advance | | 7 |
| María Torres | Women's kumite 68+ kg | Berultseva (KAZ); L 7—7 | Šáchová (CZE); W 5–0 | Lingl (USA); W 4–0 | 2 Q | Keinänen (FIN); W 2–0 | Berultseva (KAZ); L 1–7 | 2nd place, silver medalist(s) |

== Lifesaving ==
=== Men ===
| Athlete | Event | Final | |
| Athlete | Event | Points | Rank |
|---|---|---|---|
| Pau Beltrán | 50m Manikin Carry | | |
| Francisco Javier Catalá | 100M Manikin Tow With Fins | | |
| Francisco Javier Catalá | 100m Manikin Carry with Fins | | |
| Roberto Moreno | 200m obstacle Swim | | |
| Javier Pérez | 100m Manikin Carry with Fins | | |
| Javier Pérez | 200m Super Lifesaver | | |
| Raúl Marek Spuznar | | | |
| Alberto Turrado | | | |
| Miguel Ángel López | | | |
| | 4x25m Manikin Relay | | |
| | 4x50m Medeley Relay | | |
| | 4x50m Obstacle Relay | | |

=== Women ===
| Athlete | Event | Final | |
| Athlete | Event | Points | Rank |
|---|---|---|---|
| Antía García | 100m Manikin Carry with Fins | | |
| Antía García | 50m Manikin Carry | | |
| Antía García | 100m Manikin Tow with Fins | | |
| Lola Caballero | 100m Manikin Tow with Fins | | |
| María Rodríguez | 100m Manikin Carry with Fins | | |
| María Rodríguez | 200m Super Lifesaver | | |
| Núria Payola | 200m Obstacle Swim | | |
| Núria Payola | 200m Super Lifesaver | | |
| Alba Gómez | | | |
| Elsa López | | | |
| Esther García | | | |
| | 4x25m Manikin Relay | | |
| | 4x50m Medeley Relay | | |
| | 4x50m Obstacle Relay | | |

== Muay Thai ==
Spain entered two athletes into the muaythai competition at the World Games.

| Athlete | Event | Quarterfinals | Semifinals | Final / BM | |
| Athlete | Event | Opposition Result | Opposition Result | Opposition Result | Rank |
|---|---|---|---|---|---|
| Sarai Medina | Women's 48 kg | | | | |
| Javier Segura | Men's 67 kg | | | | |

== Parkour ==
Spain qualified at the 2022 World Games in:

- Men's individual event - 1 quota

| Athlete | Event | Qualifications | | Final | |
| Athlete | Event | Points | Rank | Points | Rank |
|---|---|---|---|---|---|
| Aaron Vivar | men's freestyle | | | | |

== Rhythmic Gymnastics ==
Spain qualified at the 2022 World Games in:

- Women's individual event - 1 quota

| Athlete | Event | Qualifications | | Final | |
| Athlete | Event | Points | Rank | Points | Rank |
|---|---|---|---|---|---|
| Teresa Gorospe | Ball Women | | | | |
| Teresa Gorospe | Clubs Women | | | | |
| Teresa Gorospe | Hoop Women | | | | |
| Teresa Gorospe | Ribbon Women | | | | |

== Speed Skating ==
Road

| Athlete | Event | Qualifications | | Final | |
| Athlete | Event | Time | Rank | Time | Rank |
|---|---|---|---|---|---|
| Francisco Peula | Men's 15,000 m elimination race | | | | |
| Francisco Peula | Men's 10,000 m point race | | | | |

Track

| Athlete | Event | Qualifications | | Semifinal | | Final | |
| Athlete | Event | Time | Rank | Time | Rank | Time | Rank |
|---|---|---|---|---|---|---|---|
| Nerea Langa Torres | Women's 1.000m sprint | | | | | | |
| Nerea Langa Torres | Women's 500 m sprint | 46.624 | 1 Q | 47.067 | 3 | did not advance | |
| Nerea Langa Torres | Women's 200 m time trial | 19.678 | 8 Q | —N/a | | 19.601 | 6 |
| Francisco Peula | Men's 10,000 m elimination race | | | | | | |
| Francisco Peula | Men's 10,000 m point elimination race | —N/a | | | | 5 Points | 5 |

== Squash ==
Squash

| Player | Event | Last 32 | Last 16 | Quarterfinal | Semifinal | Final / 3rd place | Rank |
| Player | Event | Opposition Score | Opposition Score | Opposition Score | Opposition Score | Opposition Score | Rank |
|---|---|---|---|---|---|---|---|
| Sergio García Pollan | Singles Men | | | | | | |

== Trampoline Gymnastics ==
Spain qualified at the 2022 World Games in:

- Women's individual event - 1 quota
- Men's individual event - 1 quota

| Athlete | Event | Qualifications | | Final | |
| Athlete | Event | Points | Rank | Points | Rank |
|---|---|---|---|---|---|
| David Franco | men's Doble MiniTramp | | | | |
| Melania Rodríguez | women's Doble MiniTramp | | | | |

== Water skiing ==
Spain competed in water skiing.

Jump

| Athlete | Event | Qualification | | Final | |
| Athlete | Event | Distance | Rank | Distance | Rank |
|---|---|---|---|---|---|
| Álvaro Noguera | men's jump | | | | |

Wakeboard

| Athlete | Event | Heat | | Repechage | | Semifinal | | Final | |
| Athlete | Event | Points | Rank | Points | Rank | Points | Rank | Points | Rank |
|---|---|---|---|---|---|---|---|---|---|
| Martin Druille | Men's wakeboard | | | | | | | | |
