= Ju-jitsu at the 2022 World Games – Men's fighting 85 kg =

Men's fighting 85 kg at the 2022 World Games
- Venue: Birmingham–Southern College
- Date: 15 July 2022
- Competitors: 6 from 6 nations

Medalists
1st place, gold medalist(s)		(Serbia) Nikola Trajković
2nd place, silver medalist(s)		(Netherlands) Donny Donker
3rd place, bronze medalist(s)		(Germany) Daniel Zmeev

The men's fighting 85 kg competition in ju-jitsu at the 2022 World Games took place on 15 July 2022 at the Birmingham–Southern College in Birmingham, United States.

== Results ==
=== Elimination round ===
==== Group A ====
Rank	Athlete	B	W	L	Pts	Score
1	Daniel Zmeev (GER)	2	2	0	31–2	+29
2	Wei Chu-cheng (TPE)	2	1	1	13–23	−10
3	Balam Quitze (MEX)	2	0	2	11–30	−19

	Score	
Daniel Zmeev (GER)	14–0	Wei Chu-cheng (TPE)
Daniel Zmeev (GER)	17–2	Balam Quitze (MEX)
Wei Chu-cheng (TPE)	13–9	Balam Quitze (MEX)

==== Group B ====
Rank	Athlete	B	W	L	Pts	Score
1	Nikola Trajković (SRB)	2	2	0	19–7	+12
2	Donny Donker (NED)	2	1	1	17–18	−1
3	Arso Milić (MNE)	2	0	2	10–21	−11

	Score	
Arso Milić (MNE)	7–13	Donny Donker (NED)
Arso Milić (MNE)	3–8	Nikola Trajković (SRB)
Donny Donker (NED)	4–11	Nikola Trajković (SRB)

=== Finals ===
Semi-finals
Daniel Zmeev (GER)	9
Donny Donker (NED)	11
Nikola Trajković (SRB)	14
Wei Chu-cheng (TPE)	7

Final
Donny Donker (NED)	9
Nikola Trajković (SRB)	14
Third place
Daniel Zmeev (NED)	9
Wei Chu-cheng (TPE)	6
