= Powerlifting at the 2022 World Games – Men's middleweight =

Powerlifting - Men's middleweight at the 2022 World Games
- Venue: Birmingham Jefferson Convention Complex, Birmingham, United States
- Dates: 9 July 2022
- Competitors: 12 from 10 nations

Medalists
gold medal	(Norway) Kjell Egil Bakkelund
silver medal	(Ukraine) Mykola Barannik
bronze medal	(United States Virgin Islands) Paul Douglas

The men's middleweight competition in powerlifting at the 2022 World Games took place on 9 July 2022 at the Birmingham Jefferson Convention Complex in Birmingham, United States.

== Competition format ==
A total of 12 athletes entered the competition, combining the 74 and 83 kilogram weight class. Each athlete had 3 attempts in each of 3 events: squat, bench press and deadlift. The athlete with the biggest score in Wilks points is the winner.

== Results ==
Rank	Athlete	Nation	Squat			Bench press			Deadlift			Total weight	Total points
Rank	Athlete	Nation	1	2	3	1	2	3	1	2	3	Total weight	Total points
1st place, gold medalist(s)	Kjell Egil Bakkelund	Norway	~~315.0~~	315.0	327.5	225.0	232.5	~~237.5~~	300.0	~~312.5~~	~~312.5~~	860.0	107.33
2nd place, silver medalist(s)	Mykola Barannik	Ukraine	340.0	352.5	360.0	245.0	255.0	260.0	280.0	292.5	302.5	922.5	106.90
3rd place, bronze medalist(s)	Paul Douglas	(United States Virgin Islands) Virgin Islands	355.0	~~365.0~~	365.0	220.0	225.0	230.0	317.5	325.0	~~330.0~~	920.0	106.62
4	Alex Ochoa	Ecuador	310.0	320.0	330.0	~~230.0~~	~~230.0~~	230.0	275.0	285.0	290.0	850.0	102.75
5	Alexis Maher	(United States Virgin Islands) Virgin Islands	~~290.0~~	290.0	310.0	167.5	172.5	~~180.0~~	330.0	346.5	355.0	837.5	100.83
6	Go Suzuki	Japan	270.0	280.0	287.5	212.5	215.0	~~217.5~~	270.0	285.0	300.0	802.5	99.71
7	Vladyslav Chornyi	Ukraine	~~320.0~~	~~320.0~~	330.0	220.0'	~~227.5~~	~~227.5~~	277.5	290.0	~~300.0~~	840.0	99.52
8	Matias Viiperi	Finland	305.0	~~320.0~~	~~320.0~~	~~240.0~~	242.5	~~257.5~~	275.0	295.0	~~310.0~~	842.5	97.95
9	Alexander Huber	Austria	290.0	300.0	310.0	220.0	~~227.5~~	227.5	280.0	290.0	~~310.0~~	827.5	95.66
10	Marcelo del Lama	Brazil	290.0	~~307.5~~	307.5	230.0	~~240.0~~	240.0	250.0	260.0	~~282.5~~	807.5	93.35
11	Manuel Gonnermann	Germany	300.0	320.0	325.0	187.5	~~200.0~~	~~200.0~~	275.0	~~297.5~~	~~297.5~~	787.5	91.16
12	Diego Milani	Italy	240.0	255.0	~~270.0~~	170.0	177.5	182.5	265.0	290.0	~~317.5~~	727.5	90.60
