= Venezuela at the 2022 World Games =

- IOC code: VEN
- NOC: Venezuelan Olympic Committee

in Birmingham, United States 7 July 2022 – 17 July 2022
- Competitors: 16 (9 men and 7 women) in 6 sports
- Medals Ranked 55th: Gold 0 Silver 2 Bronze 1 Total 3

World Games appearances
- 1981; 1985; 1989; 1993; 1997; 2001; 2005; 2009; 2013; 2017; 2022; 2025

Venezuela competed at the 2022 World Games held in Birmingham, United States from 7 to 17 July 2022. Athletes representing Venezuela won two silver medals and one bronze medal. The country finished in 55th place in the medal table.

== Medalists ==
| Medal | Name | Sport | Event | Date |
|---|---|---|---|---|
| Silver | Yorgelis Salazar | Karate | Women's kumite 50 kg | 8 July |
| Silver | Angy Quintero | Track speed skating | Women's 1000 m sprint | 9 July |

=== Invitational sports ===
| Medal | Name | Sport | Event | Date |
|---|---|---|---|---|
| Bronze | Joselyn Brea | Duathlon | Women's individual | 16 July |

== Competitors ==
The following is the list of number of competitors in the Games.

| Sport | Men | Women | Total |
|---|---|---|---|
| Duathlon | 2 | 2 | 4 |
| Karate | 1 | 1 | 2 |
| Kickboxing | 1 | 0 | 1 |
| Road speed skating Track speed skating | 1 | 2 | 3 |
| Sumo | 4 | 2 | 6 |
| Total | 9 | 7 | 16 |

== Duathlon ==
Venezuela won one bronze medal in duathlon.

== Karate ==
Venezuela won one silver medal in karate.

Men

| Athlete | Event | Elimination round | | | | Semifinal | Final / BM | |
| Athlete | Event | Opposition Result | Opposition Result | Opposition Result | Rank | Opposition Result | Opposition Result | Rank |
|---|---|---|---|---|---|---|---|---|
| Antonio Díaz | Men's kata | Quintero (ESP); L 24.48–25.54 | Busato (ITA); L 24.48–25.38 | Ujihara (SUI); W 24.82–24.60 | 3 | Did not advance | | 5 |

Women

| Athlete | Event | Elimination round | | | | Semifinal | Final / BM | |
| Athlete | Event | Opposition Result | Opposition Result | Opposition Result | Rank | Opposition Result | Opposition Result | Rank |
|---|---|---|---|---|---|---|---|---|
| Yorgelis Salazar | Women's kumite 50 kg | Tsukii (PHI); W 8–1 | Gema (ESP); W 4–1 | Hubrich (GER); W 3–0 | 1 Q | Gu (TPE); W 8–5 | Tsukii (PHI); L 0–2 | 2nd place, silver medalist(s) |

== Kickboxing ==
Venezuela competed in kickboxing.

| Athlete | Category | Quarterfinals | Semifinals | Final/Bronze medal bout | |
| Athlete | Category | Opposition Result | Opposition Result | Opposition Result | Rank |
|---|---|---|---|---|---|
| Oscar Higuera | Men's +91 kg | Shcherbatiuk (UKR); L 0–3 | did not advance | | |

== Road speed skating ==
Venezuela competed in road speed skating.

== Sumo ==
Venezuela competed in sumo.

== Track speed skating ==
Venezuela won one silver medal in track speed skating.
