= Norway at the 2022 World Games =

- IOC code: NOR
- NOC: Norwegian Olympic and Paralympic Committee and Confederation of Sports

in Birmingham, United States 7 July 2022 – 17 July 2022
- Competitors: 28 (9 men and 19 women) in 7 sports
- Medals Ranked 26th: Gold 2 Silver 2 Bronze 1 Total 5

World Games appearances
- 1981; 1985; 1989; 1993; 1997; 2001; 2005; 2009; 2013; 2017; 2022; 2025

Norway competed at the 2022 World Games held in Birmingham, United States from 7 to 17 July 2022. Athletes representing Norway won two gold medals, two silver medals and one bronze medal. The country finished in 26th place in the medal table.

== Medalists ==
Medal	Name	Sport	Event	Date
Gold	Kjell Egil Bakkelund	Powerlifting	Men's middleweight	9 July
Gold	Kasper Fosser	Orienteering	Men's middle distance	16 July
Silver	Women's team	Beach handball	Women's tournament	15 July
Silver	Mixed team	Orienteering	Mixed sprint relay	17 July
Bronze	Ingrid Lundanes	Orienteering	Women's middle distance	16 July

== Competitors ==
The following is the list of number of competitors in the Games.

Sport	Men	Women	Total
Archery	1	0	1
Beach handball	0	10	10
Canoe marathon	1	1	2
Dancesport	1	0	1
Orienteering	3	2	5
Powerlifting	2	4	6
Sumo	1	2	3
Total	9	19	28

== Archery ==
Norway competed in archery.

== Beach handball ==
Norway won one silver medal in beach handball.

== Canoe marathon ==
Norway competed in canoe marathon.

== Dancesport ==
Norway competed in dancesport (breaking).

== Orienteering ==
Norway won three medals in orienteering.

== Powerlifting ==
Norway won one gold medal in powerlifting.

Men

Athlete	Event	Exercises			Total weight	Total points	Rank
Athlete	Event	Squat	Bench press	Deadlift	Total weight	Total points	Rank
Kjell Egil Bakkelund	Men's middleweight	327.5	232.5	300.0	860.0	107.33	1st place, gold medalist(s)
Asgeir Hoel	Men's heavyweight	400.0	255.0	325.0	980.0	100.39	5

Women

Athlete	Event	Exercises			Total weight	Total points	Rank
Athlete	Event	Squat	Bench press	Deadlift	Total weight	Total points	Rank
Karen Hesthammer	Women's lightweight	190.0	102.5	175.0	467.5	95.85	4
Marte Elverum	Women's heavyweight	250.0	137.5	245.0	632.5	104.57	5
Anna Heranger	Women's super heavyweight	260.0	157.5	210.0	627.5	98.92	5
Hildeborg Hugdal	Women's super heavyweight	257.5	228.5	195.0	681.0	96.26	7

== Sumo ==
Norway competed in sumo.
