= Duathlon at the 2022 World Games =

- The pictogram of Duathlon.
- Venue: Railroad Park
- Dates: 16–17 July
- Competitors: 57 from 21 nations

The duathlon competition at the 2022 World Games took place in July 2022, in Birmingham in United States, at the Railroad Park. Originally scheduled to take place in July 2021, the Games were rescheduled for July 2022 as a result of the 2020 Summer Olympics postponement due to the COVID-19 pandemic.

== Participating nations ==
- Australia (3)
- Austria (1)
- Bahrain (1)
- Belgium (7)
- Colombia (3)
- France (5)
- Germany (1)
- Japan (2)
- Jordan (1)
- Mexico (4)
- Morocco (1)
- Netherlands (6)
- Philippines (2)
- Romania (2)
- Slovakia (1)
- South Africa (3)
- Switzerland (3)
- United Arab Emirates (2)
- United States (4)
- Uruguay (1)
- Venezuela (4)

== Medal table ==
* Host nation (United States)

Rank	Nation	Gold	Silver	Bronze	Total
1	France	2	1	1	4
2	Belgium	1	1	0	2
3	Japan	0	1	0	1
4	Mexico	0	0	1	1
4	Venezuela	0	0	1	1
Totals (5 entries)		3	3	3	9

== Medalists ==
=== Men ===
Event	Gold	Silver	Bronze
Individual	Maxime Hueber-Moosbrugger; France	Benjamin Choquert; France	Victor Zambrano; Mexico

=== Women ===
Event	Gold	Silver	Bronze
Individual	Maurine Ricour; Belgium	Ai Ueda; Japan	Joselyn Brea; Venezuela

=== Mixed ===
Event	Gold	Silver	Bronze
Mixed relay	France; Maxime Hueber-Moosbrugger; Marion Legrand	Belgium; Arnaud Dely; Maurine Ricour	France; Nathan Guerbeur; Garance Blaut
