= Uruguay at the 2022 World Games =

- IOC code: URU
- NOC: Uruguayan Olympic Committee

in Birmingham, United States 7 July 2022 – 17 July 2022
- Competitors: 2 (2 men and 0 women) in 2 sports and 2 events
- Medals: Gold 0 Silver 0 Bronze 0 Total 0

World Games appearances
- 1981; 1985; 1989; 1993; 1997; 2001; 2005; 2009; 2013; 2017; 2022; 2025

Uruguay competed at the 2022 World Games held in Birmingham, United States from 7 to 17 July 2022.

== Competitors ==
The following is the list of number of competitors in the Games.

Sport	Men	Women	Total
Ju-jitsu	1	0	1
Duathlon	1	0	1
Total	2	0	2

== Ju-jitsu ==
One competitor was scheduled to represent Uruguay in ju-jitsu.

Athlete	Category	Group stage			Semifinals	Final/Bronze medal bout	
Athlete	Category	Opposition Result	Opposition Result	Rank	Opposition Result	Opposition Result	Rank
Juan Manuel Domínguez	Men's fighting 69 kg	Cortes (MEX); W 11–9	Toplak (SLO); L 5–10	2	Salmanow (GER); L 0–14	Toplak (SLO); L 0–14	4

== Duathlon ==
Uruguay competed in duathlon.

Athlete	Event	Final	
Athlete	Event	Time	Rank
Franco Forestier	Men's individual	1:55:43	16
