= Powerlifting at the 2022 World Games – Women's heavyweight =

Powerlifting - Women's heavyweight at the 2022 World Games
- Venue: Birmingham Jefferson Convention Complex, Birmingham, United States
- Dates: 9 July 2022
- Competitors: 12 from 10 nations

Medalists
gold medal	Agata Sitko	Poland
silver medal	Kelsey McCarthy	Virgin Islands
bronze medal	Cicera Tavares	Brazil

The women's heavyweight competition in powerlifting at the 2022 World Games took place on 9 July 2022 at the Birmingham Jefferson Convention Complex in Birmingham, United States.

== Competition format ==
A total of 12 athletes entered the competition, combining the 69 and 76 kilogram weight class. Each athlete had 3 attempts in each of 3 events: squat, bench press and deadlift. The athlete with the biggest score in Wilks points is the winner.

== Results ==
Rank	Athlete	Nation	Squat			Bench press			Deadlift			Total weight	Total points
Rank	Athlete	Nation	1	2	3	1	2	3	1	2	3	Total weight	Total points
1st place, gold medalist(s)	Agata Sitko	Poland	270.0	~~280.0~~	~~280.5~~	~~195.0~~	~~195.0~~	195.0	235.0	252.5	261.0	726.0	119.12
2nd place, silver medalist(s)	Kelsey McCarthy	(United States Virgin Islands) Virgin Islands	235.0	242.5	~~250.0~~	165.0	170.0	~~172.5~~	200.0	207.5	212.5	625.0	109.44
3rd place, bronze medalist(s)	Cicera Tavares	Brazil	227.5	240.0	~~250.0~~	117.5	~~125.0~~	125.0	227.5	237.5	242.5	607.5	105.46
4	Marte Elverum	Norway	235.0	242.5	250.0	137.5	~~142.5~~	~~145.0~~	235.0	245.0	~~252.5~~	632.5	104.57
5	Cathrin Silberzahn	Germany	230.0	~~240.0~~	242.5	140.0	~~145.0~~	145.0	190.0	200.0	~~210.0~~	587.5	101.52
6	Ivana Horná	Slovakia	200.0	210.0	215.0	~~140.0~~	140.0	~~145.0~~	215.0	225.0	235.0	590.0	101.42
7	Johanna Aguinaga	Ecuador	~~210.0~~	210.0	~~220.0~~	~~162.5~~	~~162.5~~	162.5	180.0	187.5	~~192.5~~	560.0	100.52
8	Joyce Reboton	Philippines	235.0	242.5	~~247.5~~	~~142.5~~	142.5	147.5	~~212.5~~	212.5	~~220.0~~	602.5	99.16
9	Ines Kahrer	Austria	215.0	222.5	227.5	~~130.0~~	130.0	~~135.0~~	180.0	~~185.0~~	185.0	537.5	92.92
10	Sonja Kruger	Germany	270.0	280.0	~~285.0~~	95.0	~~200.0~~	~~200.0~~	170.0	~~207.5~~	~~207.5~~	545.0	91.84
	Kloie Doublin	(United States Virgin Islands) Virgin Islands	235.0	245.0	252.5	~~165.0~~	~~165.0~~	~~165.0~~	212.5	230.0	237.5	DSQ	
	Francesca Parrello	Italy	245.0	~~257.5~~	257.5	132.5	140.0	~~145.0~~	225.0	242.5	247.5	~~645.0~~	~~106.25~~
