= Canoe polo at the 2022 World Games =

- Venue: Birmingham CrossPlex
- Dates: 14–17 July 2022
- No. of events: 2

The canoe polo competition at the 2022 World Games took place in July 2022, in Birmingham in United States, at the Birmingham CrossPlex. Originally scheduled to take place in July 2021, the Games were rescheduled for July 2022 as a result of the 2020 Summer Olympics postponement due to the COVID-19 pandemic.

== Qualification ==
Due to the COVID-19 pandemic, the 2021 ICF canoe polo world championships, that would have served as the qualification event for The World Games, were cancelled. Therefore, on October 25 of 2021, the International Canoe Federation announced that Eight men's teams and eight women's teams had been officially invited to compete. The teams were chosen based on the results of the 2018 ICF canoe polo world championships.

== Participating nations ==
- Chinese Taipei
- France
- Germany
- Great Britain
- Italy
- Netherlands
- New Zealand
- Singapore
- Spain
- United States

== Medal table ==
* Host nation (United States)

Rank	Nation	Gold	Silver	Bronze	Total
1	France	1	1	0	2
1	Germany	1	1	0	2
3	New Zealand	0	0	1	1
3	Spain	0	0	1	1
Totals (4 entries)		2	2	2	6

== Medalists ==
Event	Gold	Silver	Bronze
Men's tournament	Germany; Arne Linus Beckmann; Jonas Gauselmann; Marco Hoppstock; René Kirchoff; Julian Oskar Prescher; Tim Riecke; Lennart Unterfeld; Jonas Vieren	France; Christophe Belat; Patrice Belat; Baptiste Cotta; Clement Kindig; Antoine Le Floch Decorchemont; Alan Lignel; David Linet; Benoit Richer	Spain; Javier Arego; Alejandro Casal; Sergio Corbella; Alejandro Gordo; Angel Gordo; Ivan Hoyo; Samuel Pardavila; Alejandro Valls
Women's tournament	France; Eloise Frigot; Mélissa Ledormeur; Clotilde Lemasle; Celeste Louis; Camille Meyer; Claire Moal; Marion Robert; Aline Roulland	Germany; Elena Gilles; Katharina Kruse; Jill Lara Rutzen; Svenja Schaeper; Nele Schmalenbach; Jule Schwarz; Hilke Sophie Vogt; Leonie Wagner	New Zealand; Julie Bolton; Kate Bolton; Casey Hales; Erin Moore; Klara Richter; Emma Sutherland; Georgia Wheeler; Sophie Winton
