= Sport climbing at the 2023 Pan American Games – Women's speed =

Women's speed at the 2023 Pan American Games
- Venue: Cerrillos Park Climbing Walls
- Dates: October 21
- Competitors: 12 from 5 nations
- Winning time: 7.52

Medalists
Gold medal	Piper Kelly	United States
Silver medal	Emma Hunt	United States
Bronze medal	Andrea Rojas	Ecuador

The women's competition speed climbing event at the 2023 Pan American Games was held on October 21 at the Cerrillos Park Climbing Walls in Santiago, Chile.

== Schedule ==
Date	Time	Round
October 21, 2023	19:00	Qualification
October 21, 2023	19:50	Finals

== Results ==
=== Qualification ===
Rank	Climber	Nation	Lane A	Lane B	Time
1	Emma Hunt	United States	6.82	~~6.84~~	6.82
2	Sophia Curcio	United States	~~7.79~~	7.76	7.76
3	Piper Kelly	United States	~~10.82~~	7.97	7.97
4	Valeria Macias	Mexico	~~8.37~~	8.16	8.16
5	Andrea Rojas	Ecuador	8.57	~~12.77~~	8.57
6	Anahí Riveros	Chile	8.81	~~8.93~~	8.81
7	Erica Velev	Canada	~~11.33~~	8.99	8.99
8	Carmen Contreras	Chile	9.28	~~9.67~~	9.28
9	Arantza Fernandez	Mexico	9.80	~~10.26~~	9.80
10	Abigail Ruano	Ecuador	~~11.45~~	9.92	9.92'
11	Nicole Mejia	Ecuador	~~10.42~~	10.14	10.14
12	María Hidalgo	Mexico	~~16.68~~	14.85	14.85

=== Bracket ===
Quarterfinals		Semifinals		Final
Emma Hunt (USA)	6.76
Carmen Contreras (CHI)	9.30	Emma Hunt (USA)	6.71
Valeria Macias (MEX)	8.19	Andrea Rojas (ECU)	7.74
Andrea Rojas (ECU)	7.60			Emma Hunt (USA)	FALSE START
Sophia Curcio (USA)	7.83			Piper Kelly (USA)	7.53
Erica Velev (CAN)	8.41	Sophia Curcio (USA)	9.67
Piper Kelly (USA)	7.85	Piper Kelly (USA)	7.69
Anahí Riveros (CHI)	8.57

=== Repechage ===
Bronze medal match
Andrea Rojas (ECU)	7.59
Sophia Curcio (USA)	FALL
