= Track speed skating at the 2022 World Games =

- Venue: Birmingham CrossPlex
- Dates: 8–9 July
- No. of events: 10

The track speed skating competition at the 2022 World Games took place in July 2022, in Birmingham in United States, at the Birmingham CrossPlex. Originally scheduled to take place in July 2021, the Games were rescheduled for July 2022 as a result of the 2020 Summer Olympics postponement due to the COVID-19 pandemic.

== Medal table ==
Rank	Nation	Gold	Silver	Bronze	Total
1	Colombia	5	2	0	7
2	Italy	2	2	1	5
3	Belgium	2	0	1	3
4	Germany	1	0	1	2
5	France	0	2	1	3
6	Chile	0	2	0	2
7	Venezuela	0	1	0	1
8	Ecuador	0	0	3	3
9	Chinese Taipei	0	0	2	2
Totals (9 entries)		10	9	9	28

== Medalists ==
=== Men ===
Event	Gold		Silver		Bronze	
200 m time trial	Duccio Marsili; Italy	17.835	Andrés Jiménez; Colombia	17.873	Yvan Sivilier; France	18.009
500 m sprint	Andrés Jiménez; Colombia	43.256	Duccio Marsili; Italy	43.386	Kuo Li-yang; Chinese Taipei	43.482
1000 m sprint	Duccio Marsili; Italy	1:26.974	Ricardo Verdugo; Chile	1:27.026	Bart Swings; Belgium	1:27.339
10,000 m elimination race	Bart Swings; Belgium	15:16.914	Daniel Zapata; Colombia	15:17.393	Giuseppe Bramante; Italy	15:21.510
10,000 m point elimination race	Bart Swings; Belgium	18 pts	Martin Ferrié; France	11 pts	Nils Bühnemann; Germany	11 pts

=== Women ===
Event	Gold		Silver		Bronze	
200 m time trial	Geiny Pájaro; Colombia	18.894	Asja Varani; Italy	19.020	Chen Ying-chu; Chinese Taipei	19.053
500 m sprint	Laethisia Schimek; Germany	46.992	None awarded			
1000 m sprint	Johana Viveros; Colombia	1:35.824	Angy Quintero; Venezuela	1:36.045	Gabriela Vargas; Ecuador	1:36.839
10,000 m elimination race	Johana Viveros; Colombia	16:48.975	Alejandra Traslaviña; Chile	16:49.099	Gabriela Vargas; Ecuador	16:49.595
10,000 m point elimination race	Johana Viveros; Colombia	19 pts	Marine Lefeuvre; France	9 pts	Gabriela Vargas; Ecuador	9 pts
