= Ju-jitsu at the 2022 World Games – Men's fighting 77 kg =

Men's fighting 77 kg at the 2022 World Games
- Venue: Birmingham-Southern College
- Date: 15 July 2022
- Competitors: 6 from 6 nations

Medalists
1st place, gold medalist(s)		(Germany) Simon Attenberger
2nd place, silver medalist(s)		(Denmark) Lucas Andersen
3rd place, bronze medalist(s)		(Netherlands) Boy Vogelzang

The men's fighting 77 kg competition in ju-jitsu at the 2022 World Games took place on 15 July 2022 at the Birmingham–Southern College in Birmingham, United States.

== Results ==
=== Elimination round ===
==== Group A ====
Rank	Athlete	B	W	L	Pts	Score
1	Simon Attenberger (GER)	2	2	0	15–5	+10
2	Angel Ochoa (MEX)	2	1	1	5–15	–10
3	Bakhromjon Mashrapov (UZB)	2	0	2	0–0	0

	Score	
Simon Attenberger (GER)	15–5	Angel Ochoa (MEX)
Simon Attenberger (GER)	0–0	Bakhromjon Mashrapov (UZB)
Angel Ochoa (MEX)	0–0	Bakhromjon Mashrapov (UZB)

==== Group B ====
Rank	Athlete	B	W	L	Pts	Score
1	Lucas Andersen (DEN)	2	2	0	14–0	+14
2	Boy Vogelzang (NED)	2	1	1	0–14	–14
3	Percy Kunsa (FRA)	2	0	2	0–0	0

	Score	
Boy Vogelzang (NED)	0–14	Lucas Andersen (DEN)
Boy Vogelzang (NED)	0–0	Percy Kunsa (FRA)
Lucas Andersen (DEN)	0–0	Percy Kunsa (FRA)

=== Finals ===
Semifinals
Simon Attenberger (GER)	9
Boy Vogelzang (NED)	6
Lucas Andersen (DEN)	14
Angel Ochoa (MEX)	0

Final
Simon Attenberger (GER)	14
Lucas Andersen (DEN)	0
Third place
Boy Vogelzang (NED)	14
Angel Ochoa (MEX)	0
