= Karate at the 2023 Pan American Games – Women's 50 kg =

Women's 50 kg at the 2023 Pan American Games
- Venue: Contact Sports Center
- Dates: November 4
- Competitors: 9 from 9 nations

Medalists
Gold medal	Yorgelis Salazar	Venezuela
Silver medal	Yamina Lahyanssa	Canada
Bronze medal	Barbara Morales	Independent Athletes Team
Bronze medal	Yamila Benitez	Argentina

The women's 50 kg competition of the karate events at the 2023 Pan American Games was held on November 3 at the Contact Sports Center (Centro de Entrenamiento de los Deportes de Contacto) in Santiago, Chile.

== Schedule ==
Date	Time	Round
November 4, 2023	10:00	Pool matches
November 4, 2023	16:04	Semifinals
November 4, 2023	17:14	Final

== Results ==
The athletes with the two best scores of each pool advance to the semifinals.

=== Pool A ===
Rk	Athlete	Pld	W	L	Pts.
1	Yorgelis Salazar (VEN)	3	3	0	9
2	Yamina Lahyanssa (CAN)	3	2	1	6
3	Penelope Polanco (DOM)	3	1	2	3
4	Fernanda Vega (CHI)	3	0	3	0

	Score	
Yorgelis Salazar (VEN)	3–0	Penelope Polanco (DOM)
Fernanda Vega (CHI)	1–2	Yamina Lahyanssa (CAN)
Yorgelis Salazar (VEN)	9–1	Fernanda Vega (CHI)
Penelope Polanco (DOM)	0–2	Yamina Lahyanssa (CAN)
Penelope Polanco (DOM)	8–1	Fernanda Vega (CHI)
Yorgelis Salazar (VEN)	10–3	Yamina Lahyanssa (CAN)

=== Pool B ===
Rk	Athlete	Pld	W	L	Pts.
1	Yamila Benitez (ARG)	4	3	1	9
2	Barbara Morales (EAI)	4	3	1	9
3	Claudia de la Cruz (PER)	4	3	1	9
4	Doralvis Delgado (USA)	4	1	3	3
5	Gabriella Izaguirre (ESA)	4	0	4	0

	Score	
Gabriella Izaguirre (ESA)	1–2	Claudia de la Cruz (PER)
Yamila Benitez (ARG)	2–2	Barbara Morales (EAI)
Gabriella Izaguirre (ESA)	1–3	Doralvis Delgado (USA)
Claudia de la Cruz (PER)	2–1	Yamila Benitez (ARG)
Gabriella Izaguirre (ESA)	3–5	Barbara Morales (EAI)
Claudia de la Cruz (PER)	1–0	Doralvis Delgado (USA)
Gabriella Izaguirre (ESA)	0–9	Yamila Benitez (ARG)
Doralvis Delgado (USA)	0–2	Barbara Morales (EAI)
Claudia de la Cruz (PER)	3–4	Barbara Morales (EAI)
Yamila Benitez (ARG)	1–0	Doralvis Delgado (USA)

=== Finals ===
The results were as follows:

Semifinals
Yorgelis Salazar (VEN)	8
Barbara Morales (EAI)	2
Yamila Benitez (ARG)	0
Yamina Lahyanssa (CAN)	0

Gold medal match
Yorgelis Salazar (VEN)	5
Yamina Lahyanssa (CAN)	2
