= Virgin Islands at the 2022 World Games =

Virgin Islands at the World Games 2022
- IOC code: ISV

in Birmingham, United States July 7 – 17, 2022
- Competitors: 9 in 1 sport
- Medals Ranked 54th: Gold 0 Silver 3 Bronze 1 Total 4

World Games appearances
- 1981; 1985; 1989; 1993; 1997; 2001; 2005; 2009; 2013; 2017; 2022

The United States Virgin Islands competed at the 2022 World Games in Birmingham, United States, from July 7 to 17, 2022. Athletes representing Virgin Islands won three silver medals and one bronze medal. The country finished in 54th place in the medal table.

== Medalists ==
Medal	Name	Sport	Event	Date
Silver	Taylor LaChapelle	Powerlifting	Women's middleweight	July 8
Silver	Kelsey McCarthy	Powerlifting	Women's heavyweight	July 9
Silver	Ian Bell	Powerlifting	Men's heavyweight	July 10
Bronze	Paul Douglas	Powerlifting	Men's middleweight	July 9

== Competitors ==
Sports	Men	Women	Total	Events
Powerlifting	5	4	9	5
Total	5	4	9	5

== Powerlifting ==
Virgin Islands has qualified four men and four women.

Athlete	Event	Squat	Bench press	Deadlift	Total weight	Total points	Rank
Paul Douglas	Men's middleweight	365.0	230.0	325.0	920.0	106.62	3rd place, bronze medalist(s)
Alexis Maher	Men's middleweight	310.0	172.5	355.0	837.5	100.83	5
Ian Bell	Men's heavyweight	400.0	252.5	370.0	1022.5	105.09	2nd place, silver medalist(s)
Gregory Johnson	Men's heavyweight	330.0	175.0	350.0	855.0	93.38	11
Joseph Cappellino	Men's super heavyweight	460.0	NM	355.0	DSQ		
Kimberly Johnson	Women's middleweight	215.0	140.0	195.0	550.0	105.78	4
Taylor LaChapelle	Women's middleweight	242.5	147.5	227.5	617.5	112.82	2nd place, silver medalist(s)
Kelsey McCarthy	Women's heavyweight	242.5	170.0	212.5	625.0	109.44	2nd place, silver medalist(s)
Kloie Doublin	Women's heavyweight	252.5	NM	237.5	DSQ		
