= Agata Sitko =

Polish powerlifter

Personal information
- Born: 19 November 2002 (age 23)
- Education: Silesian University of Technology
- Height: 164 cm (5 ft 5 in)
- Weight: 75.0 kg (165.3 lb)

Sport
- Sport: Powerlifting
- Coached by: Pawel Jurczynski
Medal record
Women's powerlifting
Representing Poland
World Games
Gold medal – first place	2022 Birmingham	Heavyweight
IPF World Classic Powerlifting Championships
Silver medal – second place	2022 Sun City	– 76 kg
Silver medal – second place	2023 St. Julian's	– 76 kg
Gold medal – first place	2024 Druskininkai	– 76 kg
Gold medal – first place	2025 Chemnitz	– 69 kg
IPF World Equipped Powerlifting Championships
Gold medal – first place	2021 Stavanger	– 76 kg
SBD Sheffield Powerlifting Championships
11th	2023 Sheffield	Absolute
Gold medal – first place	2024 Sheffield	Absolute
Gold medal – first place	2025 Sheffield	Absolute
IPF World Junior Classic Powerlifting Championships
Silver medal – second place	2021 Halmstad	– 76 kg
Gold medal – first place	2022 Istanbul	– 84 kg
IPF World Junior Equipped Powerlifting Championships
Silver medal – second place	2021 Oradea	– 76 kg
EPF European Open Classic Powerlifting Championships
Gold medal – first place	2022 Skierniewice	– 84 kg
EPF European Junior Equipped Powerlifting Championships
Gold medal – first place	2021 Plzeň	– 76 kg
Gold medal – first place	2022 Plzeň	– 84 kg

Agata Sitko (born 19 November 2002) is a Polish heavyweight powerlifter, competing in the IPF. Despite being a junior, she has won the World Games in 2022 as a Heavyweight, the 2024 and 2025 SBD Sheffield Powerlifting Championships, the IPF World Equipped Championships in 2021, and the World Classic Championships in 2024 and 2025.

== Powerlifting career ==
Sitko began competing in powerlifting since 2019, and competed internationally since 2021. She competed in the raw and equipped junior championships, where she won silver in both of the competitions respectively in the 76 kilogram weight class. The same year, Sitko competed in the open category despite being 18 years old, and would win gold in the 76 kilogram weight class, and broke two junior world records.

In her first powerlifting competition in the 84 kilogram weight class, Sitko would break two open world records and three junior world records, and secured first place at the 2022 European Junior Equipped Championships.

Sitko qualified for the 2022 World Games at 19 years old, competing as a Heavyweight, and would secure first place.

At the 2023 Classic Powerlifting Championships, Sitko secured second place, and bench pressed 153 kilograms for an open world record, deadlifted 240 kilograms for a junior world record, and totaled 590.5 kilograms for a junior world record.

At the 2024 SBD Sheffield Powerlifting Championships, Sitko competed in the 69 kilogram weight class for the first time, and would break three open and junior world records. Her total world record would extend the previous open world record by 9.3%, and securing first place at the competition.

Sitko secured first place for the first time at the 2024 classic powerlifting world championships at age 21, as well as bench pressing 155 kilograms and totaling 613 kilograms for a junior and open world record.

At the 2024 Euro Muscle Show, Sitko competed in the 84 kilogram weight class, and bench pressed 156 kilograms for a junior and open world record, as well as a total of 618.5 kilograms for a junior total world record, surpassing Daniella Melo's junior total record.

At the 2025 SBD Sheffield Powerlifting Championships, Sitko returned to compete in the 69 kilogram weight class at age 22. She would further extend her own total world record to 628 kilograms. At the competition, she bench pressed a world record of 158 kilograms, a world record deadlift of 260 kilograms, and a junior world record squat of 210 kilograms. This performance extended her previous world record total by 4.67%. Sitko would win the championships and become the first to win for two consecutive years.

In July 2025, Sitko withdrew from the 2025 World Games due to the IPF disallowing her coach, Pawel Jurczynski, to join the Polish team for the World Games to handle Sitko. As a result of withdrawing, Sitko's powerlifting license was suspended and has been prohibited from competing at IPF-sanctioned powerlifting competitions.

== Personal records ==
=== Competition bests ===
==== Raw ====
- Squat – 212.5 kg (468.5 lbs)
- Bench Press – 160 kg (352.7 lbs)
- Deadlift – 262 kg (578.7 lbs)
- Total – 635 kg (1,399.9 lbs)

==== Equipped ====
- Squat – 270 kg (595.2 lbs)
- Bench Press – 220 kg (485 lbs)
- Deadlift – 261 kg (575.4 lbs)
- Total – 726 kg (1,600.6 lbs)

=== International record lifts in competition ===
==== 69 kg class ====
- Squat – 210 kg (426.9 lbs) – IPF Junior Classic World Record – 1/26/2025
- Bench Press – 158 kg (348.3 lbs) – IPF Open Classic Full Power World Record – 1/26/2025
- Bench Press – 158 kg (348.3 lbs) – IPF Open Classic Bench Press Only World Record – 1/26/2025
- Bench Press – 158 kg (348.3 lbs) – IPF Junior Classic Full Power World Record – 1/26/2025
- Bench Press – 158 kg (348.3 lbs) – IPF Junior Classic Bench Press Only World Record – 1/26/2025
- Deadlift – 260 kg (573.2 lbs) – IPF Open Classic World Record – 1/26/2025
- Deadlift – 260 kg (573.2 lbs) – IPF Junior Classic World Record – 1/26/2025
- Total – 628 kg (1,384.5 lbs) – IPF Open Classic World Record – 1/26/2025
- Total – 628 kg (1,384.5 lbs) – IPF Junior Classic World Record – 1/26/2025

==== 76 kg class ====
- Bench Press – 155.5 kg (342.8 lbs) – IPF Open Classic Full Power World Record – 6/21/2024
- Bench Press – 155.5 kg (342.8 lbs) – IPF Open Classic Bench Press Only World Record – 6/21/2024
- Bench Press – 155.5 kg (342.8 lbs) – IPF Junior Classic Full Power World Record – 6/21/2024
- Bench Press – 155.5 kg (342.8 lbs) – IPF Junior Classic Bench Press Only World Record – 6/21/2024
- Deadlift – 250 kg (551.2 lbs) – IPF Junior Classic World Record – 6/21/2024
- Total – 613 kg (1,351.3 lbs) – IPF Junior Classic World Record – 6/21/2024
- Bench Press – 195 kg (429.9 lbs) – IPF Open Equipped Full Power World Record – 7/9/2022
- Bench Press – 195 kg (429.9 lbs) – IPF Open Equipped Bench Press Only World Record – 7/9/2022
- Bench Press – 195 kg (429.9 lbs) – IPF Junior Equipped Full Power World Record – 7/9/2022
- Bench Press – 195 kg (429.9 lbs) – IPF Junior Equipped Bench Press Only World Record – 7/9/2022
- Deadlift – 261 kg (575.4 lbs) – IPF Open Equipped World Record – 7/9/2022
- Deadlift – 261 kg (575.4 lbs) – IPF Junior Equipped World Record – 7/9/2022
- Total – 726 kg (1,600.5 lbs) – IPF Open Equipped World Record – 7/9/2022
- Total – 726 kg (1,600.5 lbs) – IPF Junior Equipped World Record – 7/9/2022

==== 84 kg class ====
- Bench Press – 156 kg (343.9 lbs) – IPF Junior Classic Full Power World Record – 7/14/2024
- Bench Press – 156 kg (343.9 lbs) – IPF Junior Classic Bench Press Only World Record – 7/14/2024
- Bench Press – 156 kg (343.9 lbs) – IPF Open Classic Full Power World Record – 7/14/2024
- Bench Press – 156 kg (343.9 lbs) – IPF Open Classic Bench Press World Record – 7/14/2024
- Total – 618.5 kg (1,363.6 lbs) – IPF Junior Classic World Record – 7/14/2024
- Bench Press – 188 kg (414.5 lbs) – IPF Junior Equipped Full Power World Record – 5/4/2022
- Bench Press – 220 kg (485 lbs) – IPF Junior Equipped Bench Press Only World Record – 9/25/2022
- Deadlift – 251.5 kg (554.5 lbs) – IPF Open Equipped World Record – 5/4/2022
- Deadlift – 251.5 kg (554.5 lbs) – IPF Junior Equipped World Record – 5/4/2022
- Total – 704.5 kg (1,553.2 lbs) – IPF Open Equipped World Record – 5/4/2022
- Total – 704.5 kg (1,553.2 lbs) – IPF Junior Equipped World Record – 5/4/2022
