= Sport climbing at the 2022 World Games – Women's speed =

Sport climbing – Women's speed at the 2022 World Games
- Venue: Sloss Furnaces, Birmingham, United States
- Dates: 14 July
- Competitors: 12 from 10 nations

Medalists
gold medal	Emma Hunt	United States
silver medal	Natalia Kałucka	Poland
bronze medal	Franziska Ritter	Germany

The women's speed competition in sport climbing at the 2022 World Games took place on 14 July 2022 at the Sloss Furnaces in Birmingham, United States.

== Competition format ==
A total of 12 athletes entered the competition. In qualification every athlete has 2 runs, best time counts. Top 8 climbers qualify to main competition.

== Results ==
=== Qualification ===
Rank	Athlete	Nation	Lane A	Lane B	Best	Note
1	Natalia Kałucka	Poland	7.25	7.53	7.25	Q
2	Emma Hunt	United States	7.34	7.31	7.31	Q
3	Franziska Ritter	Germany	7.78	7.39	7.39	Q
4	Capucine Viglione	France	7.61	7.84	7.61	Q
5	Andrea Rojas	Ecuador	9.58	7.90	7.90	Q
6	Patrycja Chudziak	Poland	8.47	7.93	7.93	Q
7	Tamara Ulzhabayeva	Kazakhstan	8.10	11.33	8.10	Q
8	Yelyzaveta Lavrykova	Ukraine	9.24	8.92	8.92	Q
9	Afra Hönig	Germany	10.09	Fall	10.09	
10	Laura Stöckler	Austria	11.31	Fall	11.31	
11	Grace Crowley	Australia	13.17	Fall	13.17	
12	Lauren Mukheibir	South Africa	16.93	15.84	15.84	

=== Competition bracket ===
Quarter-finals
1 Natalia Kałucka (POL)	8.79
8 Yelyzaveta Lavrykova (UKR)	12.70
4 Capucine Viglione (FRA)	7.76
5 Andrea Rojas (ECU)	7.84
2 Emma Hunt (USA)	7.49
7 Tamara Ulzhabayeva (KAZ)	Fall
3 Franziska Ritter (GER)	7.72
6 Patrycja Chudziak (POL)	11.25

Semi-finals
1 Natalia Kałucka (POL)	7.60
4 Capucine Viglione (FRA)	7.82
2 Emma Hunt (USA)	7.16
3 Franziska Ritter (GER)	7.40

Gold medal
1 Natalia Kałucka (POL)	8.88
2 Emma Hunt (USA)	7.24
Bronze medal
4 Capucine Viglione (FRA)	7.38
3 Franziska Ritter (GER)	7.32
