= Emma Hunt =

American speed climber (born 2003)

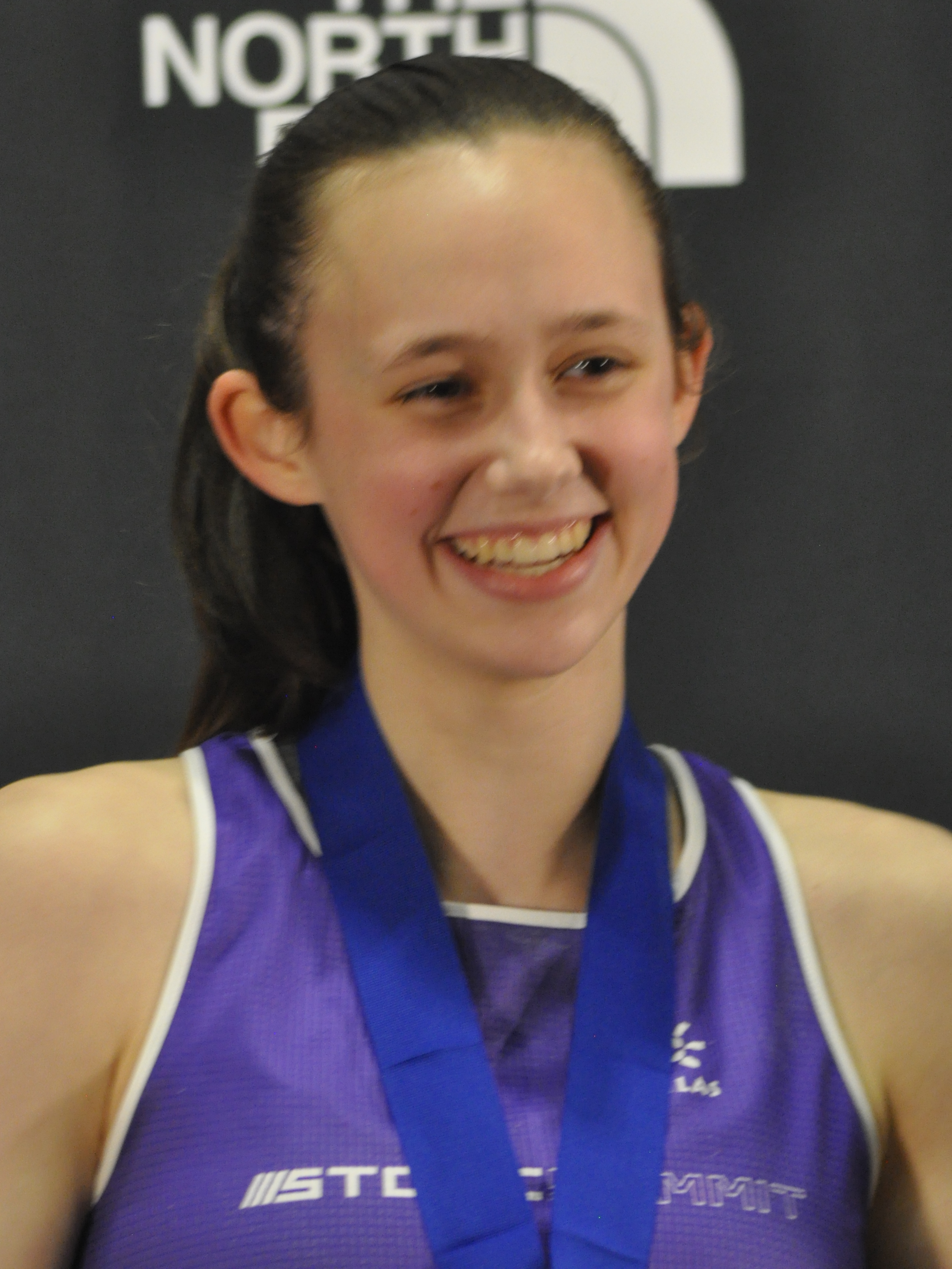
- Hunt in 2019

Personal information
- Nationality: United States
- Born: April 1, 2003 (age 23) Woodstock, Georgia
- Education: Kennesaw State University
- Years active: 2018–present
- Height: 174 cm (5 ft 9 in)

Climbing career
- Type of climber: Speed
- Known for: World women's speed record (5.99 sec)
Medal record
Women's competition climbing
Representing United States
World Championships
Silver medal – second place	2023 Bern	Speed
World Cup overall
Winner	2021	Speed
Winner	2025	Speed
Winner	2026	Speed
Silver medal – second place	2022	Speed
World Cup
Silver medal – second place	2021 Salt Lake City	Speed
Silver medal – second place	2022 Seoul	Speed
Silver medal – second place	2022 Salt Lake City	Speed
Bronze medal – third place	2022 Edinburgh	Speed
Silver medal – second place	2023 Villars	Speed
Gold medal – first place	2024 Salt Lake City	Speed
Gold medal – first place	2025 Denver	Speed
Silver medal – second place	2025 Kraków	Speed
Bronze medal – third place	2025 Chamonix	Speed
Bronze medal – third place	2025 Guiyang	Speed
World Climbing Series
Gold medal – first place	2026 Madrid	Speed
Bronze medal – third place	2026 Kraków	Speed
Gold medal – first place	2026 Kraków	Mixed Relay Speed
Bronze medal – third place	2026 Guiyang	Mixed Relay Speed
Gold medal – first place	2026 Chongqing	Speed
World Games
Gold medal – first place	2022 Birmingham	Women's speed
Pan American Games
Silver medal – second place	2023 Santiago	Speed

Emma Hunt (born April 1, 2003) is an American competition climber who specializes in competition speed climbing, and holds the world women's speed record with 5.99 seconds, set in July 2026 at the World Climbing Series in Kraków, Poland.

== Competition climbing career ==
Hunt finished first overall in speed for the 2025 IFSC Climbing World Cup Series and has 12 World Cup podium finishes overall. She finished seventh at the 2021 IFSC Climbing World Championships.

Hunt won her first senior event at the 2021 IFSC Pan-American Championships in Ibarra, Ecuador. She also won the gold medal in the women's speed event at the 2022 World Games in July 2022.

Hunt competed in speed climbing at the 2024 Summer Olympics. She won her heat against Manon Lebon of France in the elimination round of qualifications with a time of 6.38. Hunt ended up in fifth place after losing in the quarterfinals to Rajiah Sallsabillah of Indonesia.

== Personal life ==
Hunt graduated a year early from high school and began attending Kennesaw State University in 2020.

== Major results ==
=== Olympic Games ===
Discipline	2024
Speed	5

=== World championships ===
Discipline	2021	2023
Speed	7	2

=== World Cup ===
Discipline	2019	2021	2022	2023	2024	2025
Speed	51	1	2	7	7	1

=== Pan American championships ===
Discipline	2020	2021
Bouldering	—	3
Speed	—	1
Combined	8	—

=== US Women's Speed Climbing Records 15m Wall ===
Emma Hunt World and American Women's 15m speed record progression
#	Date / season	Time	Athlete	Event	Round
Previous	Before 2019 Youth Nationals	8.46	Piper Kelly	Previous U.S. women's 15m speed record	—
1	2019	8.39	Emma Hunt	USA Climbing Youth National Championships	Qualification
2	2019	8.26	Emma Hunt	USA Climbing Youth National Championships	Finals
3	2019	8.25	Emma Hunt	USA Climbing Youth National Championships	Finals
4	August 2019	8.18	Emma Hunt	IFSC Youth World Championships, Arco, Italy	Semifinal
5	August 2019	8.17	Emma Hunt	IFSC Youth World Championships, Arco, Italy	Final
6	March 1, 2020	8.05	Emma Hunt	IFSC Pan American Championships, Los Angeles	—
7	March 28, 2021	8.04	Emma Hunt	USA Climbing Team Trials Invitational, Memphis	—
8	March 29, 2021	7.95	Emma Hunt	USA Climbing Team Trials Invitational, Memphis	—
9	March 29, 2021	7.76	Emma Hunt	USA Climbing Team Trials Invitational, Memphis	—
10	March 29, 2021	7.56	Emma Hunt	USA Climbing Team Trials Invitational, Memphis	—
11	May 28, 2021	7.52	Emma Hunt	IFSC Climbing World Cup, Salt Lake City	—
12	July 2, 2021	7.43	Emma Hunt	IFSC Climbing World Cup, Villars	—
13	July 2, 2021	7.19	Emma Hunt	IFSC Climbing World Cup, Villars	—
14	May 27, 2022	7.17	Emma Hunt	IFSC Climbing World Cup, Salt Lake City	Qualification
15	May 27, 2022	7.05	Emma Hunt	IFSC Climbing World Cup, Salt Lake City	Qualification
16	September 10, 2022	7.02	Emma Hunt	IFSC Climbing World Cup, Edinburgh	Qualification
17	September 10, 2022	6.88	Emma Hunt	IFSC Climbing World Cup, Edinburgh	Quarterfinal
18	September 10, 2022	6.83	Emma Hunt	IFSC Climbing World Cup, Edinburgh	Semifinal
19	April 28, 2023	6.82	Emma Hunt	IFSC Climbing World Cup, Seoul	—
20	May 7, 2023	6.79	Emma Hunt	IFSC Climbing World Cup, Jakarta	—
21	July 2, 2023	6.68	Emma Hunt	IFSC Climbing World Cup, Villars	—
22	August 10, 2023	6.67	Emma Hunt	IFSC Climbing World Championships, Bern	—
23	April 24, 2024	6.30	Emma Hunt	North American Cup Series, Salt Lake City	—
24	July 12, 2025	6.25	Emma Hunt	IFSC Climbing World Cup, Chamonix	Finals
25	May 31, 2026	6.231	Emma Hunt	World Climbing Series, Comunidad de Madrid	Qualification
26	May 31, 2026	6.21	Emma Hunt	World Climbing Series, Comunidad de Madrid	Quarterfinal
27	May 31, 2026	6.10	Emma Hunt	World Climbing Series, Comunidad de Madrid	Semifinal
28	May 31, 2026	6.08	Emma Hunt	World Climbing Series, Comunidad de Madrid	Final
29	July 4, 2026	5.99	Emma Hunt	World Climbing Series, Kraków (World Record)	Final

== See also ==
- List of grade milestones in rock climbing
- History of rock climbing
- Rankings of most career IFSC gold medals
