= Artistic roller skating at the 2022 World Games – Men's singles =

Artistic roller skating - men's singles at the 2022 World Games
- Venue: Birmingham CrossPlex, Birmingham, United States
- Dates: 16–17 July 2022
- Competitors: 8 from 8 nations

Medalists
gold medal	(Spain) Pau Garcia Domec
silver medal	(Italy) Alessandro Liberatore
bronze medal	(Germany) Tim Niclas Schubert

The men's singles competition in artistic roller skating at the 2022 World Games took place from 16 to 17 July 2022 at the Birmingham CrossPlex in Birmingham, United States.

== Competition format ==
A total of 8 skaters entered the competition. Short program and long program were held.

== Results ==
Rank	Skater	Nation	Short program	Long program	Total
1st place, gold medalist(s)	Pau Garcia Domec	Spain	89.99	186.06	276.05
2nd place, silver medalist(s)	Alessandro Liberatore	Italy	86.18	149.82	236.00
3rd place, bronze medalist(s)	Tim Niclas Schubert	Germany	65.57	123.29	188.86
4	Diogo Antonio Cunha Craveiro	Portugal	58.13	121.56	179.69
5	Juan Sebastián Lemus	Colombia	61.51	101.62	163.13
6	Thiago Tortato	Brazil	44.31	89.42	133.73
7	Victor Florencio Lopez Blanco	Paraguay	44.16	79.17	123.33
8	Collin Motley	United States	35.35	65.79	101.14
