= Powerlifting at the 2022 World Games =

- Venue: Birmingham Jefferson Convention Complex
- Dates: 8–10 July
- No. of events: 8
- Competitors: 94 from 28 nations

The powerlifting competition at the 2022 World Games took place in July 2022, in Birmingham in United States, at the Birmingham Jefferson Convention Complex. Originally scheduled to take place in July 2021, the Games were rescheduled for July 2022 as a result of the 2020 Summer Olympics postponement due to the COVID-19 pandemic.

== Participating nations ==
- Austria (2)
- Belgium (1)
- Brazil (7)
- Canada (1)
- Chinese Taipei (5)
- Costa Rica (1)
- Denmark (4)
- Ecuador (5)
- Egypt (1)
- Finland (1)
- France (5)
- Germany (6)
- Great Britain (3)
- Iceland (2)
- Italy (5)
- Japan (3)
- Mongolia (1)
- Netherlands (2)
- Norway (6)
- Philippines (1)
- Poland (5)
- Puerto Rico (1)
- Slovakia (1)
- South Africa (1)
- Sweden (1)
- Ukraine (11)
- United States (3)
- Virgin Islands (9)

== Medal table ==
* Host nation (United States)

| Rank | Nation | Gold | Silver | Bronze | Total |
|---|---|---|---|---|---|
| 1 | Ukraine | 2 | 1 | 4 | 7 |
| 2 | Japan | 2 | 0 | 0 | 2 |
| 3 | Poland | 1 | 1 | 0 | 2 |
| 4 | Italy | 1 | 0 | 1 | 2 |
| 5 | Canada | 1 | 0 | 0 | 1 |
| 5 | Norway | 1 | 0 | 0 | 1 |
| 7 | Virgin Islands | 0 | 3 | 1 | 4 |
| 8 | Chinese Taipei | 0 | 2 | 0 | 2 |
| 9 | United States* | 0 | 1 | 0 | 1 |
| 10 | France | 0 | 0 | 1 | 1 |
| 10 | Great Britain | 0 | 0 | 1 | 1 |
| Totals (11 entries) | | 8 | 8 | 8 | 24 |

== Events ==
=== Men ===
| Event | Gold | Silver | Bronze |
|---|---|---|---|
| Lightweight | Yusuke Satake; Japan | Hsieh Tsung-ting; Chinese Taipei | Hassan El Belghiti; France |
| Middleweight | Kjell Egil Bakkelund; Norway | Mykola Barannik; Ukraine | Paul Douglas; Virgin Islands |
| Heavyweight | Volodymyr Rysiev; Ukraine | Ian Bell; Virgin Islands | Danylo Kovalov; Ukraine |
| Super heavyweight | Oleksiy Bychkov; Ukraine | Sen Yang; Chinese Taipei | Tony Cliffe; Great Britain |

=== Women ===
| Event | Gold | Silver | Bronze |
|---|---|---|---|
| Lightweight | Yukako Fukushima; Japan | Zuzanna Kula; Poland | Anastasiia Derevianko; Ukraine |
| Middleweight | Carola Garra; Italy | Taylor LaChapelle; Virgin Islands | Larysa Soloviova; Ukraine |
| Heavyweight | Agata Sitko; Poland | Kelsey McCarthy; Virgin Islands | Cicera Tavares; Brazil |
| Super heavyweight | Rhaea Stinn; Canada | Bonica Brown; United States | Tetyana Melnyk; Ukraine |
