= Artistic roller skating at the 2022 World Games – Women's singles =

Artistic roller skating - women's singles at the 2022 World Games
- Venue: Birmingham CrossPlex, Birmingham, United States
- Dates: 16–17 July 2022
- Competitors: 8

Medalists
| gold medal | (Italy) Rebecca Tarlazzi |
| silver medal | (Spain) Andrea Silva Pascual |
| bronze medal | (Spain) Carla Escrich |

The women's singles competition in artistic roller skating at the 2022 World Games took place from 16 to 17 July 2022 at the Birmingham CrossPlex in Birmingham, United States.

== Competition format ==
A total of 8 skaters entered the competition. Short program and long program were held.

== Results ==
| Rank | Skater | Nation | Short program | Long program | Total |
|---|---|---|---|---|---|
| 1st place, gold medalist(s) | Rebecca Tarlazzi | Italy | 79.45 | 114.21 | 193.66 |
| 2nd place, silver medalist(s) | Andrea Silva Pascual | Spain | 62.30 | 101.63 | 163.93 |
| 3rd place, bronze medalist(s) | Carla Escrich | Spain | 62.21 | 98.68 | 160.89 |
| 4 | Micol Zangoli | Italy | 56.20 | 85.81 | 142.01 |
| 5 | Bianca Corteze | Brazil | 48.05 | 72.19 | 120.24 |
| 6 | Ashley Clifford | United States | 44.89 | 73.96 | 118.85 |
| 7 | Carolina Burwan | Argentina | 41.71 | 72.19 | 113.90 |
| 8 | Ludivine Malle | France | 33.15 | 62.37 | 95.52 |
