= Piper Kelly =

American speed climber (born 1999)

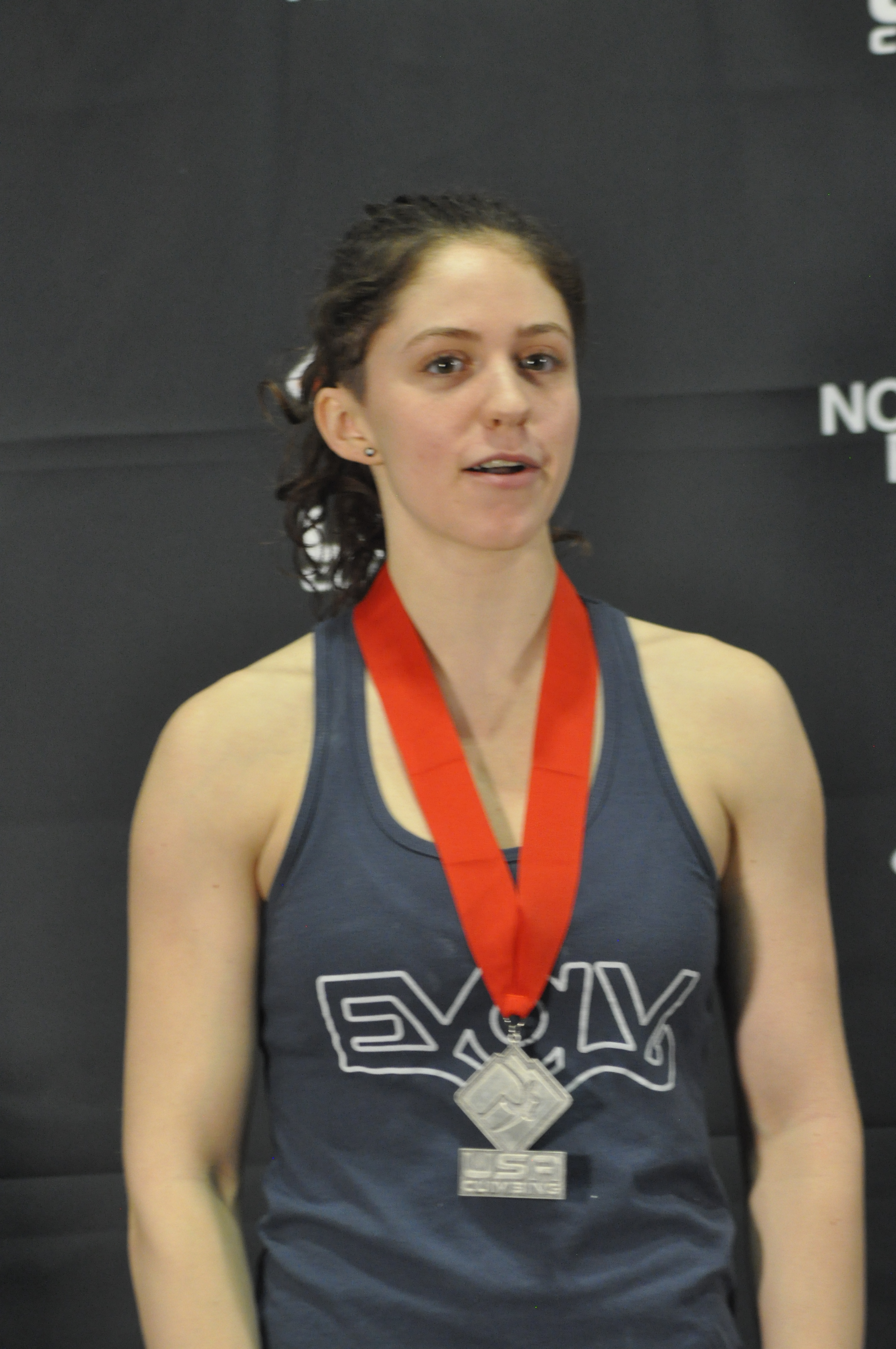
- Kelly with a silver medal at the 2019 US Sport & Speed Open National Championships

Personal information
- Born: October 3, 1999 (age 26) Indianapolis, Indiana, U.S.
- Education: Xavier University
- Height: 165 cm (5 ft 5 in)

Climbing career
- Type of climber: Speed
Medal record
Women's competition climbing
Representing the United States
Pan American Games
Gold medal – first place	2023 Santiago	Speed

Piper Kelly (born October 3, 1999) is an American professional rock climnber who specializes in competition speed climbing. She won a gold medal in her event at the 2023 Pan American Games and qualified for the 2024 US Olympic Team.

== Early life and education ==
Kelly was born on October 3, 1999, in Indianapolis, began climbing at age seven, and began competing in climbing at age 12. After graduating from Irvington Prep Academy in Indianapolis, she majored in exercise science as a student at Xavier University in Cincinnati, Ohio. She credits her small class sizes at Xavier for allowing her to focus on the biomechanics of climbing in her studies. She graduated in 2023, with minors in psychology and Spanish.

== Competition results ==
At the 2026 USA Climbing National Championships, Piper earned her fourth silver medal. She previously took silver at the 2018, 2019, and 2022 U.S. National Championships, and added a bronze medal in 2021.

At the 2023 Pan American Games, Kelly claimed the gold medal in the women's speed climbing event and qualified for the 2024 Summer Olympics. During the gold medal race, the top seed, her teammate Emma Hunt, suffered a false start in the final race. Kelly had to re-run the race alone after the false start, achieving her personal best official time of 7.52 seconds. As of 2024, her ranking from IFSC World Cup events places her 9th in the world among women speed climbers.

At the 2018 International Federation of Sport Climbing (IFSC) Pan American Championship in Guayaquil, Ecuador, she won the speed championships at the senior level.

As a youth competitor, Kelly placed first in the Junior category at the 2017 Pan American Youth Climbing Championships in Montreal, Canada.

After repeated shoulder dislocations, she took a break from competing for nearly two years beginning in 2020 for shoulder surgery.

== 2024 Olympics ==
In 2019, when Kelly won the youth nationals, she already stated "I'm not ruling it out" regarding competing in the 2024 Summer Olympics. Her win at the 2023 Pan Am Games gave her a place on the US Olympic team, part of the sport climbing event there, as one of only 14 competitors in women's speed.

In the qualification seeding round of the Olympics, Kelly received the 9th seed for the elimination rounds with the best time 7.39. She finished the competition after Indonesia's Desak Made Rita Kusuma Dewi eliminated her in the next round and placed in the 13th position.

== Major results ==
=== Olympic Games ===
Discipline	2024
Speed	13

=== World championships ===
Discipline	2018	2019	2021	2023
Speed	23	—	—	26

=== World Cup ===
Discipline	2018	2019	2021	2022	2023	2024
Speed	37	—	—	27	28	20
