= Karate at the 2022 World Games – Women's kumite 50 kg =

Women's kumite 50 kg at the 2022 World Games
- Venue: Bill Battle Coliseum
- Location: Birmingham, United States
- Dates: 8 July
- Competitors: 8 from 8 nations

Medalists
gold medal	Junna Tsukii	Philippines
silver medal	Yorgelis Salazar	Venezuela
bronze medal	Miho Miyahara	Japan

The women's kumite 50 kg competition in karate at the 2022 World Games took place on 8 July 2022 at the Bill Battle Coliseum in Birmingham, United States.

== Results ==
=== Elimination round ===
==== Pool A ====
Pos	Athlete	B	W	D	L	Pts	Score	(Venezuela)	(Philippines)	(Germany)	(Spain)
1	Yorgelis Salazar (VEN)	3	3	0	0	6	15–2	—	8–1	3–0	4–1
2	Junna Tsukii (PHI)	3	1	0	2	2	10–15	1–8	—	6–4	3–3
3	Shara Hubrich (GER)	3	1	0	2	2	7–10	0–3	4–6	—	3–1
4	Gema Morales (ESP)	3	1	0	2	2	5–10	1–4	3–3	1–3	—

Source: Birmingham 2022

==== Pool B ====
Pos	Athlete	B	W	D	L	Pts	Score	(Japan)	(Chinese Taipei)	(United States)	(Ukraine)
1	Miho Miyahara (JPN)	3	3	0	0	6	10–4	—	7–2	1–1	2–1
2	Gu Shiau-shuang (TPE)	3	2	0	1	4	5–7	2–7	—	2–0	1–0
3	Eva Alexander (USA)	3	1	0	2	2	4–4	1–1	0–2	—	3–1
4	Kateryna Kryva (UKR)	3	0	0	3	0	2–6	1–2	0–1	1–3	—

Source: Birmingham 2022

=== Finals ===
Semi-finals
Yorgelis Salazar (VEN)	8
Gu Shiau-shuang (TPE)	5
Miho Miyahara (JPN)	3
Junna Tsukii (PHI)	4

Gold medal bout
Yorgelis Salazar (VEN)	0
Junna Tsukii (PHI)	2
Bronze medal bout
Gu Shiau-shuang (TPE)	0
Miho Miyahara (JPN)	4
