= Finswimming at the 2022 World Games – Men's 100 m surface =

Finswimming – Men's 100 m surface at the 2022 World Games
- Venue: Birmingham CrossPlex, Birmingham, United States
- Dates: 8 July 2022
- Competitors: 8 from 8 nations

Medalists
gold medal	GER Max Poschart
silver medal	CRO Filip Strikinac
bronze medal	GRE Anastasios Mylonakis

The men's 100 m surface event in finswimming at the 2022 World Games took place on 8 July 2022 at the Birmingham CrossPlex in Birmingham, United States.

== Competition format ==
A total of eight athletes entered the competition. Only final was held.

== Results ==
=== Final ===
Rank	Athlete	Nation	Time
1st place, gold medalist(s)	Max Poschart	Germany	34.50
2nd place, silver medalist(s)	Filip Strikinac	Croatia	34.90
3rd place, bronze medalist(s)	Anastasios Mylonakis	Greece	36.39
4	Kohki Ueno	Japan	36.45
5	Serhii Smishchenko	Ukraine	36.75
6	Juan Camilo Rodriguez	Colombia	36.77
7	Stefano Figini	Italy	37.00
8	Shan Yongan	China	47.04
