= Veronika Ivanovskaia =

German pool player (born 1995)

Veronika Halliday
Personal information
- Born: 1 February 1995 (age 31) Saint Petersburg, Russia

Pool career
- Country: Germany
- Current rank: 37

Veronika Halliday née Ivanovskaia (born 1 February 1995) is a German professional pool player. She began to play in 2003, and later became part of the German national team. She was the winner of the 2018 European Pool Championships eight-ball event, and the runner-up at the 2017 Austria Open.

== Early life ==
Born in Saint Petersburg, Russia, Veronika Halliday is the eldest child of Russian immigrants. At a young age she and her family moved to Hanover. In the course of her youth, Halliday became a German citizen. Being encouraged to play from the age of 8, she was not tall enough to reach the table. She stood on a crate of Coca-Cola whilst she was playing, and kept the crate as a souvenir. She later became a professional psychologist.

== Career ==
As a youth player, she participated in various tournaments and national championships and won her first German championship at the age of 15. In 2013, she became the junior European Pool Championships eight-ball winner. In 2016, Halliday won her first adult championship, the German Women's Championships in 8-Ball. She now competes on the Euro Tour, where she has reached five semi-finals and also the final of the 2017 Austria Open.

In addition, she regularly participates in World Championships and other international tournaments, such as the WPA Women's World Nine-ball Championship in China and the Amway E-Spring International Women's 9-Ball Championship. At the 2018 European Pool Championship, she won her first adult European championship, defeating Tamara Peeters in the final of the eight-ball event. In 2022, she participated in the 2022 World Games.

== Titles ==
- 2018 European Pool Championship 8-ball
- 2023 European Pool Championship 10-ball
