= 2017 Austria Open =

Dynamic Billiard Austrian Open

Tournament information
- Dates: 17–20 May 2017
- Venue: Alpina, Wellness & Sporthotel
- City: St. Johann im Pongau
- Country: Austria
- Organisation: Euro Tour
- Format: Single Elimination
- Total prize fund: €36,000
- Winner's share: €4,500

Final
- Champion: (Austria) Mario He
- Runner-up: (Spain) Francisco Sánchez Ruiz
- Score: 9-2

The 2017 Dynamic Austria Open, was the third Euro Tour 9-Ball pool event in 2017. The event was won by Austria's Mario He who defeated Spain's Francisco Sánchez Ruiz 9–2 in the final.

== Tournament format ==
The event saw a total of 162 players compete, in a double-elimination knockout tournament, until the last 32 stage; where the tournament was contested as single elimination.

=== Prize fund ===
	Prize money
Winner	4.500 €
Finalist	€3.000
Semifinalist	€1.750
quarterfinalist	€1.250
last 16	€1.000
Last 32	€500
33–48 Place	€250
Total	€36.000

== Tournament results ==
1st Round
(Spain) David Alcaide	9
(Estonia) Denis Grabe	4
(Spain) Francisco Díaz-Pizarro	9
(Germany) Oliver Ortmann	6
(Greece) Nikos Ekonomopoulos	4
(Austria) Albin Ouschan	9
(Russia) Ruslan Tschinachow	9
(Poland) Wojciech Szewczyk	5
(Poland) Tomasz Kapłan	8
(Austria) Mario He	9
(Greece) Alexander Kazakis	7
(England) Daryl Peach	9
(Netherlands) Marco Teutscher	9
(Germany) Sebastian Ludwig	7
(France) Stephan Cohen	6
(Netherlands) Niels Feijen	9
(Russia) Konstantin Stepanov	9
(Russia) Andrei Seroschtan	3
(England) Mark Gray	2
(Spain) Francisco Sánchez	9
(Slovakia) Jakub Koniar	9
(Greece) Nick Malai	4
(Poland) Radosław Babica	4
(Netherlands) Nick van den Berg	9
(Russia) Fedor Gorst	9
(Poland) Konrad Juszczyszyn	6
(Germany) Joshua Filler	9
(Finland) Petri Makkonen	2
(England) Imran Majid	9
(Poland) Mariusz Skoneczny	4
(Norway) Mats Schjetne	9
(Poland) Daniel Macioł	6

2nd Round
(Spain) David Alcaide	9
(Spain) Francisco Díaz-Pizarro	6
(Austria) Albin Ouschan	9
(Russia) Ruslan Tschinachow	5
(Austria) Mario He	9
(England) Daryl Peach	3
(Netherlands) Marco Teutscher	9
(Netherlands) Niels Feijen	5
(Russia) Konstantin Stepanov	6
(Spain) Francisco Sánchez	9
(Slovakia) Jakub Koniar	7
(Netherlands) Nick van den Berg	9
(Russia) Fedor Gorst	7
(Germany) Joshua Filler	9
(England) Imran Majid	9
(Norway) Mats Schjetne	4

Quarterfinals
(Spain) David Alcaide	7
(Austria) Albin Ouschan	9
(Austria) Mario He	9
(Netherlands) Marco Teutscher	4
(Spain) Francisco Sánchez	9
(Netherlands) Nick van den Berg	5
(Germany) Joshua Filler	9
(England) Imran Majid	2

Semifinals
(Austria) Albin Ouschan	8
(Austria) Mario He	9
(Spain) Francisco Sánchez	9
(Germany) Joshua Filler	7

Finals
(Austria) Mario He	9
(Spain) Francisco Sánchez	2
