= Germany at the 2022 World Games =

- IOC code: GER
- NOC: German Olympic Sports Confederation

in Birmingham, United States 7 July 2022 – 17 July 2022
- Competitors: 237 (123 men and 113 women) in 34 sports
- Medals Ranked 1st: Gold 24 Silver 7 Bronze 16 Total 47

World Games appearances
- 1981; 1985; 1989; 1993; 1997; 2001; 2005; 2009; 2013; 2017; 2022; 2025

Germany competed at the 2022 World Games held in Birmingham, United States from 7 to 17 July 2022. Athletes representing Germany won 24 gold medals, 7 silver medals and 16 bronze medals. The country finished in 1st place in the medal table.

== Medalists ==
Medal	Name	Sport	Event	Date
Gold	Max Poschart	Finswimming	Men's 100 m surface	8 July
Gold	Max Poschart	Finswimming	Men's 200 m surface	9 July
Gold	Robert Golenia; Malte Striegler; Justus Mörstedt; Max Poschart	Finswimming	Men's 4 × 100 metre surface relay	9 July
Gold	Johanna Schikora	Finswimming	Women's 400 m surface	9 July
Gold	Anna Laethisia Schimek	Track speed skating	Women's 500 m sprint	8 July
Gold	Tobias Bludau; Michelle Uhl	Dancesport	Rock 'n' Roll	9 July
Gold	Jan Malkowski	Lifesaving	Men's 100 m manikin carry fins	10 July
Gold	Nina Holt	Lifesaving	Women's 200 m obstacle	10 July
Gold	Danny Wieck	Lifesaving	Men's 50 m manikin carry	11 July
Gold	Tim Brang	Lifesaving	Men's 100 m manikin tow fins	11 July
Gold	Fabian Ende; Joshua Perling; Fabian Thorwesten; Danny Wieck	Lifesaving	Men's 4 × 25 m manikin carry relay	11 July
Gold	Nina Holt	Lifesaving	Women's 50 m manikin carry	11 July
Gold	Undine Lauerwald; Nina Holt; Vivian Zander; Kerstin Lange	Lifesaving	Women's 4 × 25 m manikin carry relay	11 July
Gold	Nina Holt; Vivian Zander; Kerstin Lange; Undine Lauerwald	Lifesaving	Women's 4 × 50 m medley relay	11 July
Gold	Undine Lauerwald	Lifesaving	Women's 100 m manikin carry fins	10 July
Gold	Florian Unruh	Archery	Men's individual recurve	12 July
Gold	Men's team	Fistball	Men's tournament	14 July
Gold	Women's team	Fistball	Women's tournament	14 July
Gold	Women's team	Beach handball	Women's tournament	15 July
Gold	Simon Attenberger	Ju-jitsu	Men's fighting 77 kg	15 July
Gold	Annalena Bauer	Ju-jitsu	Women's fighting 70 kg	15 July
Gold	Jaschar Salmanow	Ju-jitsu	Men's fighting 69 kg	16 July
Gold	Joshua Filler	Cue sports	Men's 9-ball pool	16 July
Gold	Men's team	Canoe polo	Men's tournament	17 July
Silver	Marius-Andrei Balan; Khrystyna Moshenska	Dancesport	Latin	8 July
Silver	Nico Paufler	Canoe marathon	Men's short distance	11 July
Silver	Daniel Schmidt	Trampoline gymnastics	Men's double mini-trampoline	15 July
Silver	Daniel Blintsov; Pia Schuetze	Acrobatic gymnastics	Mixed pair	15 July
Silver	Mixed team	Tug of war	Mixed outdoor 580 kg	16 July
Silver	Mixed team	Ju-jitsu	Mixed national team competition	16 July
Silver	Women's team	Canoe polo	Women's tournament	17 July
Bronze	Simon Albrecht	Road speed skating	Men's 1 lap	11 July
Bronze	Nils Bühnemann	Track speed skating	Men's 10,000 m point elimination race	8 July
Bronze	Tim Brang	Lifesaving	Men's 100 m manikin carry fins	10 July
Bronze	Nina Holt	Lifesaving	Women's 100 m manikin carry fins	10 July
Bronze	Joshua Perling	Lifesaving	Men's 50 m manikin carry	11 July
Bronze	Fabian Ende; Jan Malkowski; Danny Wieck; Fabian Thorwesten	Lifesaving	Men's 4 × 50 m medley relay	11 July
Bronze	Kerstin Lange	Lifesaving	Women's 50 m manikin carry	11 July
Bronze	Justus Mörstedt; Malte Striegler; Robert Golenia; Max Poschart	Finswimming	Men's 4 × 50 metre surface relay	8 July
Bronze	Elisa Tartler	Archery	Women's individual recurve	12 July
Bronze	Franziska Ritter	Sport climbing	Women's speed	14 July
Bronze	Geena Krueger	Water skiing	Women's slalom	15 July
Bronze	Daniel Zmeev	Ju-jitsu	Men's fighting 85 kg	15 July
Bronze	Lilian Weiken	Ju-jitsu	Women's fighting 63 kg	15 July
Bronze	Irina Brodski	Ju-jitsu	Women's ne-waza 48 kg	15 July
Bronze	Tim Schubert	Artistic roller skating	Men's singles	17 July

=== Invitational sports ===
Medal	Name	Sport	Event	Date
Bronze	Mixed team	Wheelchair rugby	Mixed tournament	17 July

== Competitors ==
The following is the list of number of competitors in the Games.

Sport	Men	Women	Total
Acrobatic gymnastics	5	1	6
Air sports	4	0	4
Archery	3	3	6
Artistic roller skating	1	0	1
Beach handball	0	10	10
Boules sports	0	2	2
Bowling	2	2	4
Canoe marathon	1	1	2
Canoe polo	8	8	16
Cue sports	3	2	5
Dancesport	5	7	12
Duathlon	0	1	1
Finswimming	4	4	8
Fistball	10	10	20
Flag football	12	0	12
Flying disc	7	7	14
Ju-jitsu	4	4	8
Karate	0	3	3
Kickboxing	0	1	1
Korfball	7	7	14
Lacrosse	12	0	12
Lifesaving	8	6	14
Muaythai	0	1	1
Orienteering	2	2	4
Powerlifting	1	5	6
Road speed skating Track speed skating	2	2	4
Sport climbing	0	2	2
Squash	3	2	5
Sumo	0	4	4
Trampoline gymnastics	1	1	2
Tug of war	11	13	24
Water skiing	1	2	3
Wheelchair rugby	6	1	7
Total	123	113	237

== Acrobatic gymnastics ==
Germany won one silver medal in acrobatic gymnastics.

== Air sports ==
Germany competed in air sports and drone racing.

== Archery ==
Germany won two medals in archery.

== Artistic roller skating ==
Germany won one bronze medal in artistic roller skating.

== Beach handball ==
Germany won one gold medal in beach handball.

== Boules sports ==
Germany competed in boules sports.

== Bowling ==
Germany competed in bowling.

== Canoe marathon ==
Germany won one medal in canoe marathon.

== Canoe polo ==
Germany won two medals in canoe polo.

== Cue sports ==
Germany won one gold medal in cue sports.

== Dancesport ==
Germany won two medals in dancesport.

== Duathlon ==
Germany competed in duathlon.

== Finswimming ==
Germany won five medals in finswimming.

== Fistball ==
Germany won the gold medal in both the men's and women's fistball tournaments.

== Flag football ==
Germany competed in flag football.

== Flying disc ==
Germany competed in the flying disc competition.

== Ju-jitsu ==
Germany won seven medals in ju-jitsu.

== Karate ==
Germany competed in karate.

Athlete	Event	Elimination round				Semifinal	Final / BM	
Athlete	Event	Opposition Result	Opposition Result	Opposition Result	Rank	Opposition Result	Opposition Result	Rank
Jasmin Jüttner	Women's kata	Casale (ITA); L 23.60–24.34	Sánchez (ESP); L 24.34–26.06	Anacan (NZL); W 24.46–23.72	3	Did not advance		5
Shara Hubrich	Women's kumite 50 kg	Gema (ESP); W 3–1	Tsukii (PHI); L 4–6	Salazar (VEN); L 0–3	3	Did not advance		5
Jana Messerschmidt	Women's kumite 55 kg	Youssef (EGY); L 2–6	Allen (USA); L 0–1	Campbell (CAN); W 6–0	3	Did not advance		5

== Kickboxing ==
Germany competed in kickboxing.

Athlete	Category	Quarterfinals	Semifinals	Final/Bronze medal bout	
Athlete	Category	Opposition Result	Opposition Result	Opposition Result	Rank
Sila Roderburg	Women's 60 kg	Bjelogrlić (SRB); L 0–3	did not advance		

== Korfball ==
Germany competed in korfball.

== Lacrosse ==
Germany competed in lacrosse.

== Lifesaving ==
Germany won 14 medals in lifesaving.

== Muaythai ==
Germany competed in muaythai.

== Orienteering ==
Germany competed in orienteering.

== Road speed skating ==
Germany won one bronze medal in road speed skating.

== Sport climbing ==
Germany won one bronze medal in sport climbing.

== Squash ==
Germany competed in squash.

== Track speed skating ==
Germany won two medals in track speed skating.

== Trampoline gymnastics ==
Germany won one silver medal in trampoline gymnastics.

== Tug of war ==
Germany won one silver medal in tug of war.

== Water skiing ==
Germany won one bronze medals in water skiing.

== Wheelchair rugby ==
Germany won the bronze medal in the wheelchair rugby tournament.
