= Kjell Egil Bakkelund =

Norwegian powerlifter (born 1988)

Kjell Bakkelund
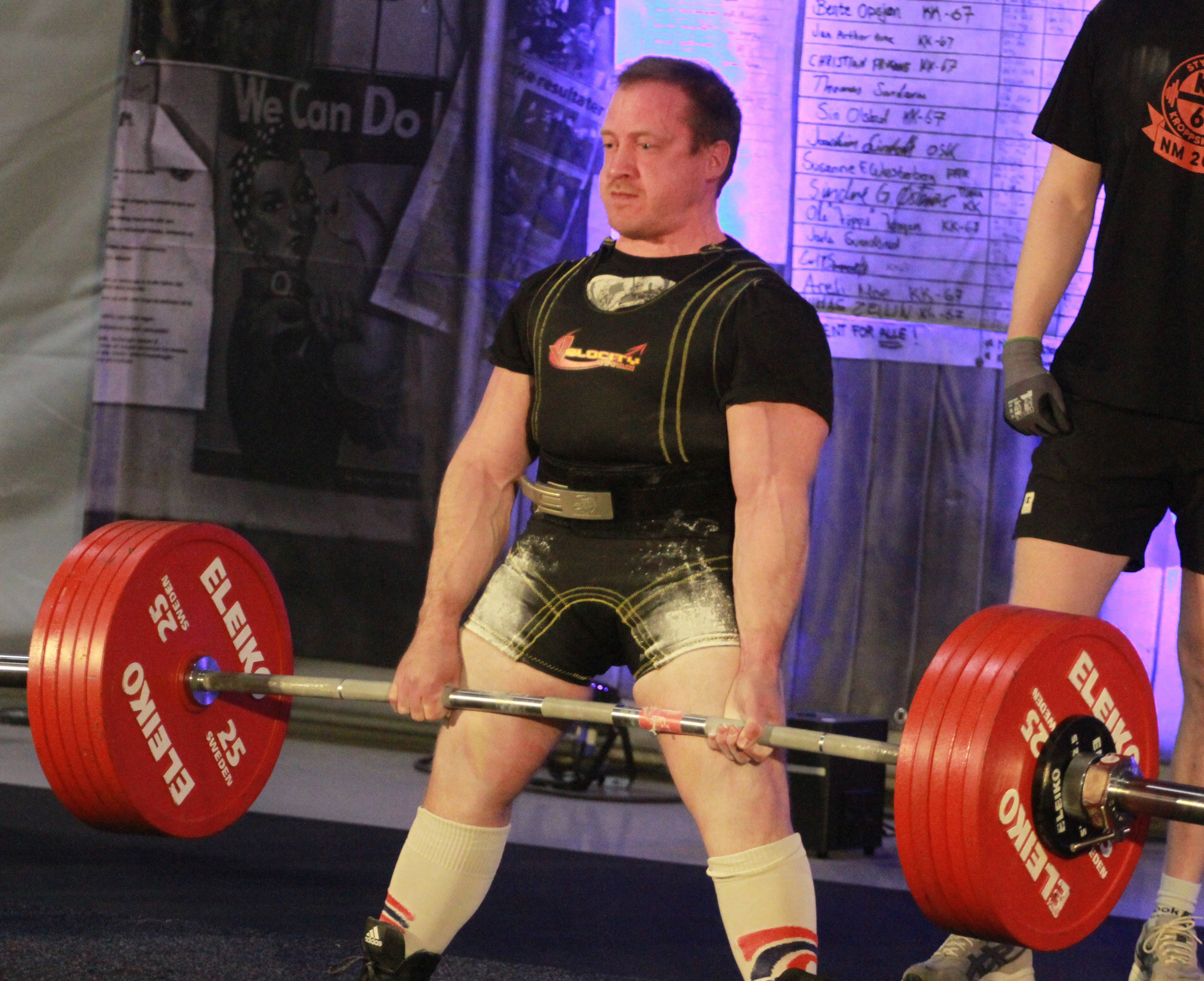
- Kjell Egil Bakkelund under NM-veka 2023

Personal information
- Full name: Kjell Egil Bakkelund
- Born: 18 July 1988 (age 37) Gjøvik, Norway

Sport
- Sport: Powerlifting
Medal record
Representing Norway
World Games
Silver medal – second place	2013 Cali	Middleweight equipped
Gold medal – first place	2022 Birmingham	Middleweight equipped
Bronze medal – third place	2025 Chengdu	Middleweight classic
IPF World Classic Powerlifting Championships
Gold medal – first place	2017 Minsk	74 kg
Silver medal – second place	2019 Helsingborg	74 kg
4th	2023 St. Julians	74 kg
Silver medal – second place	2024 Druskininkai	74 kg
Gold medal – first place	2024 Chemnitz	66 kg
IPF World Equipped Powerlifting Championships
Gold medal – first place	2013 Stavanger	83 kg
Bronze medal – third place	2018 Halmstad	74 kg
Gold medal – first place	2019 Dubai	74 kg
Gold medal – first place	2021 Stavanger	74 kg
Gold medal – first place	2022 Viborg	74 kg
SBD Sheffield Powerlifting Championships
Gold medal – first place	2025 Sheffield	Absolute
EPF European Classic Powerlifting Championships
Gold medal – first place	2018 Kaunas	74 kg
Gold medal – first place	2023 Tartu	74 kg
EPF European Equipped Powerlifting Championships
Gold medal – first place	2013 Plzeň	83 kg
Gold medal – first place	2014 Sofia	83 kg
Gold medal – first place	2019 Plzeň	74 kg
Gold medal – first place	2022 Plzeň	74 kg
Gold medal – first place	2023 Thisted	83 kg

Kjell Egil Bakkelund (born 18 July 1988) is a Norwegian powerlifter. Bakkelund has won 7 gold medals at the world championships (both classic & equipped) and 9 gold medals at the European championships in the IPF. He is also a three-time World Games medallist, winning a silver medal in 2013 World Games in Cali, a gold medal at the 2022 World Games in Birmingham, and a bronze medal at the 2025 World Games in Chengdu, as well as a gold medal at the 2025 SBD Sheffield Powerlifting Championships.

== Career ==
Bakkelund began his career as a junior in 2011. Since then, he won both classic and equipped world titles, including the 2022 World Equipped Powerlifting Championships which were held in Viborg, Denmark. In 2022, he secured a gold medal from the 2022 World Games. Following his switching between classic and equipped powerlifting throughout his career, Bakkelund decided to focus on classic meets. He competed at both 2023 IPF World Classic Championships in Malta and at the European Powerlifting Federation's Equipped Championships where he got a gold medal for totaling 907.5 kg. As a result of his competition, Bakkelund broke both the IPF classic deadlift and total world records in 74 kg weight class.
