= Chinese Taipei at the 2022 World Games =

- IOC code: TPE
- NOC: Chinese Taipei Olympic Committee

in Birmingham, United States 7 July 2022 – 17 July 2022
- Competitors: 74 (30 men and 44 women) in 16 sports
- Medals Ranked 33rd: Gold 1 Silver 6 Bronze 6 Total 13

World Games appearances
- 1981; 1985; 1989; 1993; 1997; 2001; 2005; 2009; 2013; 2017; 2022

Chinese Taipei competed at the 2022 World Games held in Birmingham, United States from 7 to 17 July 2022. "Chinese Taipei" is the designated name used by Taiwan to participate in some international organizations and almost all sporting events. Athletes representing Chinese Taipei won one gold medal, six silver medals and six bronze medals. The country finished in 33rd place in the medal table.

== Medalists ==
Medal	Name	Sport	Event	Date
Gold	Women's team	Tug of war	Women's outdoor 540 kg	15 July
Silver	Hsieh Tsung-ting	Powerlifting	Men's lightweight	8 July
Silver	Yang Sen	Powerlifting	Men's super heavyweight	10 July
Silver	Kuo Li-yang	Road speed skating	Men's 100 m	10 July
Silver	Chen Ying-chu	Road speed skating	Women's 100	10 July
Silver	Chou Chieh-yu	Cue sports	Women's nine-ball pool	16 July
Bronze	Kuo Li-yang	Track speed skating	Men's 500 m sprint	8 July
Bronze	Chen Ying-chu	Track speed skating	Women's 200 m time trial	8 July
Bronze	Chen Ying-chu	Road speed skating	Women's 1 lap	11 July
Bronze	Women's team	Softball	Women's tournament	13 July
Bronze	Mixed team	Korfball	Mixed tournament	17 July

=== Invitational sports ===
Medal	Name	Sport	Event	Date
Silver	Liu Pei-hsun	Wushu	Women's taijiquan & taijijian	12 July
Bronze	Lai Po-wei	Wushu	Men's nanquan & nangun	12 July

== Competitors ==
The following is the list of number of competitors in the Games.

Sport	Men	Women	Total
Air sports	0	1	1
Bowling	0	2	2
Canoe polo	8	0	8
Cue sports	1	1	2
Finswimming	0	1	1
Ju-jitsu	1	0	1
Karate	1	1	2
Korfball	7	7	14
Powerlifting	4	1	5
Road speed skating Track speed skating	2	2	4
Softball	0	15	15
Sumo	3	3	6
Tug of war	0	9	9
Water skiing	1	0	1
Wushu	2	1	3
Total	30	44	74

== Air sports ==
Chinese Taipei competed in drone racing.

== Bowling ==
Chinese Taipei competed in bowling.

== Canoe polo ==
Chinese Taipei competed in canoe polo.

== Cue sports ==
Chinese Taipei won one silver medal in cue sports.

== Finswimming ==
Chinese Taipei competed in finswimming.

== Ju-jitsu ==
Chinese Taipei competed in ju-jitsu.

== Karate ==
Chinese Taipei competed in karate.

Men

Athlete	Event	Elimination round				Semifinal	Final / BM	
Athlete	Event	Opposition Result	Opposition Result	Opposition Result	Rank	Opposition Result	Opposition Result	Rank
Hsu Wei-chun	Men's kumite 75 kg	Hárspataki (HUN); L 1–5	Otabolaev (UZB); D 1–1	Scott (USA); L 2–3	4	Did not advance		7

Women

Athlete	Event	Elimination round				Semifinal	Final / BM	
Athlete	Event	Opposition Result	Opposition Result	Opposition Result	Rank	Opposition Result	Opposition Result	Rank
Gu Shiau-shuang	Women's kumite 50 kg	Alexander (USA); W 2–0	Miyahara (JPN); L 2–7	Kryva (UKR); W 1–0	2 Q	Salazar (VEN); L 5–8	Miyahara (JPN); L 0–4	4

== Korfball ==
Chinese Taipei won the bronze medal in the korfball tournament.

== Powerlifting ==
Chinese Taipei won two silver medals in powerlifting.

== Road speed skating ==
Chinese Taipei won three medals in road speed skating.

== Softball ==
Chinese Taipei won the bronze medal in the softball tournament.

== Sumo ==
Chinese Taipei competed in sumo.

== Track speed skating ==
Chinese Taipei won two bronze medals in track speed skating.

== Tug of war ==
Chinese Taipei won one gold medal in tug of war.

== Water skiing ==
Chinese Taipei competed in water skiing.

== Wushu ==
Chinese Taipei won two medals in wushu.
