= Nine-ball at the 2022 World Games – women's singles =

Nine-ball billiards women's singles at the 2022 World Games
- Venue: Birmingham Jefferson Convention Complex, Birmingham, United States
- Dates: 13–16 July 2022
- Competitors: 16 from 14 nations

Medalists
gold medal	(United Kingdom) Kelly Fisher
silver medal	(Chinese Taipei) Chou Chieh-yu
bronze medal	(Japan) Yuki Hiraguchi

The women's singles nine-ball competition at the 2022 World Games took place from 13 to 16 July 2022 at the Birmingham Jefferson Convention Complex in Birmingham, United States.

== Competition format ==
A total of 16 players entered the competition. They competed in knock-out system.

== Bracket ==
Round of 16
(United Kingdom) Kelly Fisher	9
(India) Chitra Magimairajan	3
(Canada) Brittany Bryant	9
(United States) Jennifer Barretta	8
(Poland) Oliwia Zalewska	9
(Turkey) Eylül Kibaroğlu	4
(New Zealand) Molrudee Kasemchaiyanan	0
(Japan) Yuki Hiraguchi	9
(Chinese Taipei) Chou Chieh-yu	9
(Costa Rica) Adriana Villar	6
(United States) Monica Webb	8
(South Korea) Park Eun-ji	9
(Germany) Veronika Ivanovskaia	9
(Argentina) Bernarda Ayala	1
(Germany) Pia Filler	8
(Philippines) Rubilen Amit	9

Quarter-finals
(United Kingdom) Kelly Fisher	9
(Canada) Brittany Bryant	7
(Poland) Oliwia Zalewska	6
(Japan) Yuki Hiraguchi	9
(Chinese Taipei) Chou Chieh-yu	9
(South Korea) Park Eun-ji	1
(Germany) Veronika Ivanovskaia	9
(Philippines) Rubilen Amit	8

Semi-finals
(United Kingdom) Kelly Fisher	9
(Japan) Yuki Hiraguchi	5
(Chinese Taipei) Chou Chieh-yu	9
(Germany) Veronika Ivanovskaia	3

Final
(United Kingdom) Kelly Fisher	9
(Chinese Taipei) Chou Chieh-yu	5
Third place
(Japan) Yuki Hiraguchi	9
(Germany) Veronika Ivanovskaia	7
