= Montenegro at the 2022 World Games =

- IOC code: MNE
- NOC: Montenegrin Olympic Committee

in Birmingham, United States 7 July 2022 – 17 July 2022
- Competitors: 3 (2 men and 1 woman) in 1 sport
- Medals: Gold 0 Silver 0 Bronze 0 Total 0

World Games appearances
- 1981; 1985; 1989; 1993; 1997; 2001; 2005; 2009; 2013; 2017; 2022; 2025

Montenegro competed at the 2022 World Games in Birmingham, Alabama, United States from 7 July to 17 July 2022.

== Competitors ==
Three athletes from Montenegro qualified for the Games.

Sport	Men	Women	Total
Ju-jitsu	2	1	3
Total	2	1	3

== Ju-jitsu ==
All three of Montenegro's athletes competed in ju-jitsu.

Arso Milić competed in the men's fighting 85 kg event. He finished in third place in his group and did not advance to the bracket.

Lidija Cakovic and Stefan Vukotic competed in the mixed duo event. They finished in third place in their pool and did not advance to the bracket.
