= Serbia at the 2022 World Games =

- IOC code: SRB
- NOC: Olympic Committee of Serbia

in Birmingham, United States 7 July 2022 – 17 July 2022
- Competitors: 5 (2 men and 3 women) in 3 sports
- Medals Ranked 26th: Gold 2 Silver 2 Bronze 1 Total 5

World Games appearances
- 1981; 1985; 1989; 1993; 1997; 2001; 2005; 2009; 2013; 2017; 2022; 2025

Serbia competed at the 2022 World Games held in Birmingham, United States from 7 to 17 July 2022. Athletes representing Serbia won two gold medals, two silver medals and one bronze medal. The country finished in 26th place in the medal table.

== Medalists ==
Medal	Name	Sport	Event	Date
Gold	Aleksandra Krstić	Kickboxing	Women's 70 kg	14 July
Gold	Nikola Trajković	Ju-jitsu	Men's fighting 85 kg	15 July
Silver	Milana Bjelogrlić	Kickboxing	Women's 60 kg	14 July
Silver	Ivan Della Croce	Ju-jitsu	Men's fighting 69 kg	16 July
Bronze	Nataša Antonjak	Boules sports	Women's lyonnaise precision shooting	13 July

== Competitors ==
The following is the list of number of competitors in the Games.

Sport	Men	Women	Total
Boules sports	0	1	1
Ju-jitsu	2	0	2
Kickboxing	0	2	2
Total	2	3	5

== Boules sports ==
Serbia won one bronze medal in boules sports.

== Ju-jitsu ==
Serbia won two medals in ju-jitsu.

== Kickboxing ==
Serbia won two medals in kickboxing.
