= Junna Tsukii =

Filipino-Japanese karateka (born 1991)

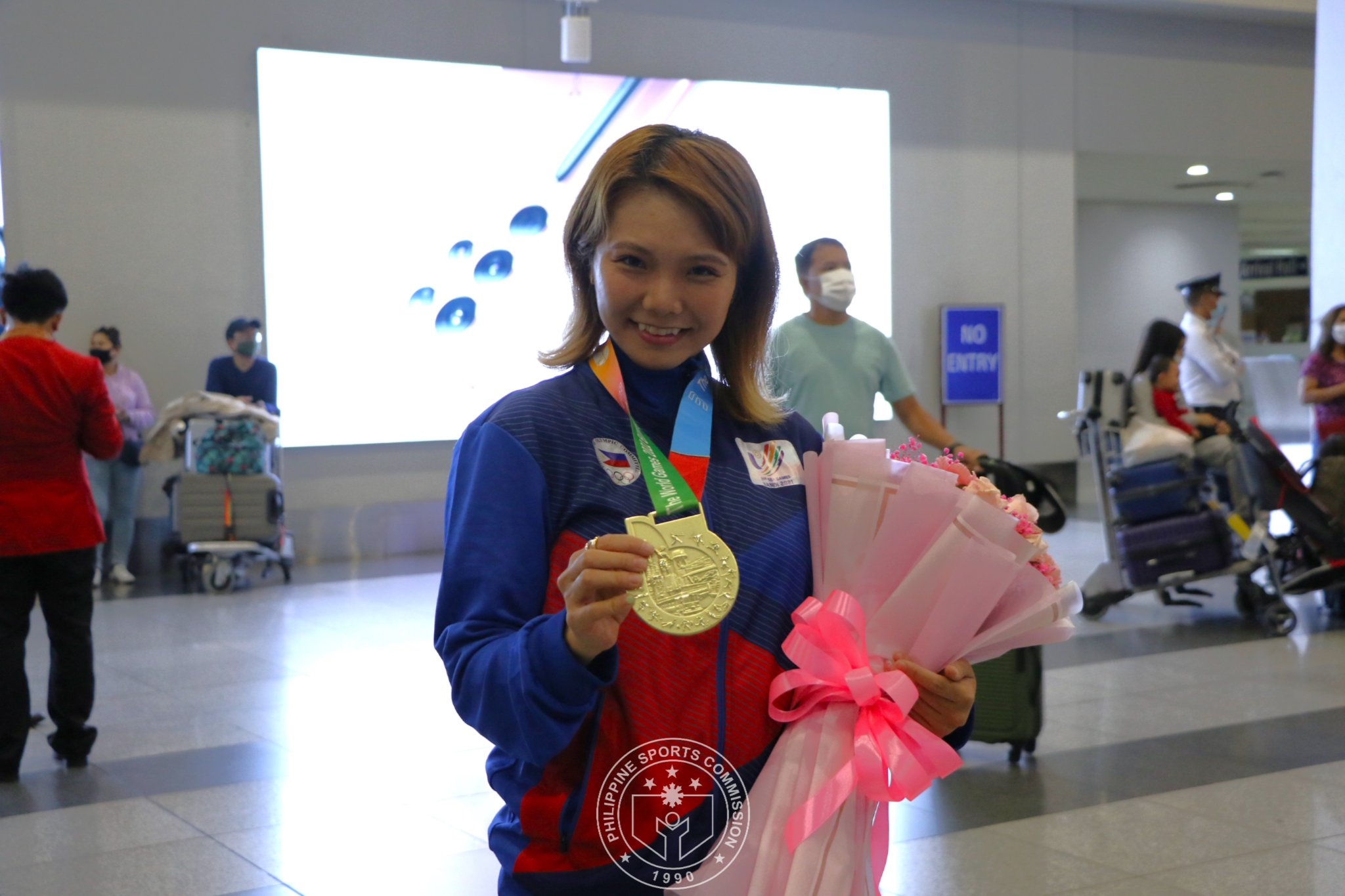
- Tsukii in 2022
- Born: Junna Villanueva Tsukii; September 30, 1991 (age 35); Pasay, Philippines
- Native name: 月井 隼南
- Nationality: Japanese; Filipino
- Height: 155 cm (5 ft 1 in)
- Weight: 50 kg (110.2 lb; 7.9 st)

Mixed martial arts record
- Total: 5
- Wins: 2
- By knockout: 1
- By submission: 1
- Losses: 3
- By knockout: 1
- By submission: 1
- By disqualification: 1

Other information
- Occupation: Teacher
- University: Takushoku University
- Mixed martial arts record from Sherdog

Junna Villanueva Tsukii (月井 隼南, Tsukii Junna) (born September 30, 1991) is a Filipino-Japanese mixed martial artist and former karateka. Representing the Philippines in karate, she won the gold medal in the women's kumite 50 kg event at the 2022 World Games in Birmingham, United States.

== Early life and education ==
Junna Tsukii was born in Pasay, Philippines on September 30, 1991. She was born to Shin Tsukii, a Japanese coach, and Lilia Villanueva, a Filipina. Junna is the second eldest among three children. She moved to Japan when she was three years old.

She went to a junior high school in Kansai. She studied at Takushoku University in Tokyo, Japan. She would obtain a teacher's license for social studies and went back to her alma mater in Kansai to teach.

== Career ==
=== Karate ===
Tsukii took up karate at age seven joining her own father's dojo in Japan. She would rise to become a national champion in Japan when she was on her second year in junior high school and selected to represent the country internationally. However she was hindered by serious injuries at age 17. She tried to return to the Japanese national team while recovering from injuries but she later decided to represent the Philippines in 2017.

Representing the Philippines, Tsukii won one of the bronze medals in the women's kumite 50 kg event at the 2018 Asian Games held in Jakarta, Indonesia. In her bronze medal match she defeated Paweena Raksachart of Thailand.

In 2019, Tsukii won the gold medal in the women's kumite 50 kg event at the Southeast Asian Games held in the Philippines. In 2017, she won one of the bronze medals in this event at the Southeast Asian Games held in Kuala Lumpur, Malaysia. That year, she also won one of the bronze medals in the team kumite event.

In 2021, Tsukii won the gold medal in her event at the Karate 1-Premier League event held in Lisbon, Portugal. In June 2021, she competed at the World Olympic Qualification Tournament held in Paris, France hoping to qualify for the 2020 Summer Olympics in Tokyo, Japan. She did not qualify as she was eliminated in her first match by Ivet Goranova of Bulgaria. In November 2021, Tsukii competed in the women's 50 kg event at the World Karate Championships held in Dubai, United Arab Emirates. She was eliminated in her second match. In December 2021, she won the silver medal in her event at the Asian Karate Championships held in Almaty, Kazakhstan.

Tsukii won the gold medal in the women's kumite 50 kg event of the 2022 World Games held in Birmingham, United States. She defeated Yorgelis Salazar of Venezuela in her gold medal match. In 2023, Tsukii competed in the women's 50 kg event at the 2022 Asian Games held in Hangzhou, China where she was eliminated in her first match. In the same month, she competed in the women's 50 kg event at the 2023 World Karate Championships held in Budapest, Hungary where she was eliminated in her second match.

In June 2024, Tsukii announced that she was retiring from karate and will be moving to MMA.

=== Mixed martial arts ===
After her retirement from karate in 2024, Tsukii would transition to mixed martial arts. Tsukii fought Ruka Sakamoto in the women's 54 kilogram category at the 2024 Deep Jewels Summer Festival in Odaiba, Japan on August 31.

== Personal life ==
Tsukii cannot speak Tagalog well and learned English while she was in Japan but found her education on the language inadequate which initially made her doubt herself if she is fit to represent the Philippines. She learned how to sing Lupang Hinirang, the national anthem, when she first became a representative of the country to compensate for her lack of fluency in Tagalog.

She also manages her own YouTube channel where she holds karate web seminars.

== Mixed martial arts record ==
Professional record breakdown
5 matches	2 wins	3 losses
By knockout	1	1
By submission	1	1
By disqualification	0	1

Res.	Record	Opponent	Method	Event	Date	Round	Time	Location	Notes
Loss	2–3	Yuko Kiryu	TKO (punches)	DEEP Jewels 53	May 24, 2026	2	1:37	Tokyo, Japan	
Win	2–2	Saya Nakamura	KO (punches)	DEEP Jewels 51	November 23, 2025	1	0:35	Tokyo, Japan	Strawweight debut.
Loss	1–2	Saya Nakamura	DQ (illegal upkick)	DEEP Jewels 50	September 7, 2025	1	3:36	Tokyo, Japan	Catchweight (50kg) bout.
Loss	1–1	Keito Oyama	Submission (rear naked choke)	DEEP 122 Impact	November 4, 2024	2	4:01	Tokyo, Japan	Catchweight (50kg) bout.
Win	1–0	Ruka Sakamoto	Submission (rear naked choke)	DEEP Summer Festival 2024 in Odaiba	August 31, 2024	1	2:11	Tokyo, Japan	Catchweight (54kg) bout.
