= Yorgelis Salazar =

Venezuelan karateka (born 1997)

Personal information
- Born: 10 November 1997 (age 28)

Sport
- Country: Venezuela
- Sport: Karate
- Weight class: 50 kg
- Events: Kumite; Team kumite
Medal record
Women's karate
Representing Venezuela
Event	1st	2nd	3rd
World Games	0	1	0
World Championships	0	0	2
Pan American Games	1	0	0
South American Games	1	0	0
Bolivarian Games	2	2	0
Total	4	3	2
World Games
Silver medal – second place	2022 Birmingham	Kumite 50 kg
World Championships
Bronze medal – third place	2023 Budapest	Kumite 50 kg
Bronze medal – third place	2025 Cairo	Kumite 50 kg
Pan American Games
Gold medal – first place	2023 Santiago	Kumite 50 kg
South American Games
Gold medal – first place	2022 Asunción	Kumite 50 kg
Bolivarian Games
Gold medal – first place	2025 Lima-Ayacucho	Kumite 50 kg
Gold medal – first place	2025 Lima-Ayacucho	Team kumite
Silver medal – second place	2022 Valledupar	Kumite 50 kg
Silver medal – second place	2022 Valledupar	Team kumite

Yorgelis Salazar (born 10 November 1997) is a Venezuelan karateka. She won the silver medal in the women's 50 kg event at the 2022 World Games held in Birmingham, United States. She won one of the bronze medals in the women's 50 kg event at the 2023 World Karate Championships held in Budapest, Hungary.

== Career ==
In June 2021, Salazar competed at the World Olympic Qualification Tournament held in Paris, France hoping to qualify for the 2020 Summer Olympics in Tokyo, Japan. She was eliminated in her second match by Jana Messerschmidt of Germany. In November 2021, Salazar was eliminated in her first match in the women's 50 kg event at the World Karate Championships held in Dubai, United Arab Emirates.

Salazar won the silver medal in the women's 50 kg event at the 2022 Bolivarian Games held in Valledupar, Colombia. She also won the silver medal in the women's team kumite event. In 2023, she won one of the bronze medals in the women's 50 kg event at the World Karate Championships held in Budapest, Hungary. She defeated Aika Okazaki of Japan in her bronze medal match. A week later, Salazar won the gold medal in her event at the 2023 Pan American Games held in Santiago, Chile.

== Achievements ==
Year	Competition	Location	Rank	Event
2022	Bolivarian Games	Valledupar, Colombia	2nd	Kumite 50 kg
2022	Bolivarian Games	Valledupar, Colombia	2nd	Team kumite
2022	World Games	Birmingham, United States	2nd	Kumite 50 kg
2022	South American Games	Asunción, Paraguay	1st	Kumite 50 kg
2023	World Championships	Budapest, Hungary	3rd	Kumite 50 kg
2023	Pan American Games	Santiago, Chile	1st	Kumite 50 kg
