= Czech Republic at the 2022 World Games =

- IOC code: CZE
- NOC: Czech Olympic Committee

in Birmingham, United States 7 July 2022 – 17 July 2022
- Competitors: 87 (57 men and 30 women) in 19 sports
- Flag bearer: Daniel Brabec
- Medals Ranked 53rd: Gold 0 Silver 3 Bronze 3 Total 6

World Games appearances
- 1981; 1985; 1989; 1993; 1997; 2001; 2005; 2009; 2013; 2017; 2022; 2025

Czech Republic competed at the 2022 World Games held in Birmingham, United States from 7 to 17 July 2022. Athletes representing the Czech Republic won three silver medals and three bronze medals. The country finished in 53rd place in the medal table.

== Medalists ==
Medal	Name	Sport	Event	Date
Silver	Jaroslav Lorenc	Bowling	Men's singles	11 July
Silver	Aleš Chamrád; Mikuláš Zbořil; Jakub Bernard; Štěpán Turek; Oscar Flynn; Dominik Frodl; Daniel Brabec; Patrik Šebek; Petr Kafka; Martin Fiala; Tomáš Rubeš; Jan Vyoral; Marek Loskot; Filip Kuťák	Inline hockey	Men's tournament	12 July
Silver	Tereza Janošíková	Orienteering	Women's sprint	15 July
Bronze	Lukáš Bauer; Dominik Beneš; Martin Beneš; Jiří Besta; Adam Delong; Filip Forman; Matěj Havlas; Adam Hemerka; Mikuláš Krbec; Filip Langer; Ondřej Němeček; Lukáš Punčochář; Josef Rýpar; Matyáš Šindler	Floorball	Men's tournament	12 July
Bronze	Petr Dvořáček	Kickboxing	Men's 75 kg	14 July
Bronze	Tomáš Křivda	Orienteering	Men's sprint	15 July

== Competitors ==
The following is the list of number of competitors in the Games.

Sport	Men	Women	Total
Air sports	4	0	4
Archery	1	1	2
Bowling	2	0	2
Canoe marathon	1	1	2
Dancesport	3	3	3
Finswimming	1	0	1
Floorball	14	0	14
Inline hockey	14	0	14
Karate	0	1	1
Kickboxing	1	1	2
Korfball	7	6	13
Lacrosse	0	12	12
Muaythai	1	1	2
Orienteering	2	2	4
Parkour	1	1	2
Road speed skating Track speed skating	1	0	1
Squash	2	1	3
Water skiing	2	0	2
Total	57	30	87

== Air sports ==
Czech Republic competed in air sports and drone racing.

=== Air sports ===
Athlete	Event	Event	AC 1	DI 1	FS 1	SP 1	DI 2	FS 2	AC 2	SP 2	DI 3	FS 3	AC 3	SP 3	Final	Rank
Jakub Sklenka	Parachuting – Canopy piloting	Result	59	135.31	70.600	2.519	91.45	76.200	77	3.260	121.77	63.100	69	2.817	178	11
Jakub Sklenka	Parachuting – Canopy piloting	Rank	21	16	19	7	28	11	12	22	8	8	21	5	178	11
Petr Měšťák	Parachuting – Canopy piloting	Result	81	137.04	57.000	2.683	97.95	61.400	69	ME	111.64	1.000	16	3.392	265	28
Petr Měšťák	Parachuting – Canopy piloting	Rank	4	13	30	17	26	24	16	34	17	22	34	28	265	28
Mark Rahbani	Parachuting – Canopy piloting	Result	48	122.56	66.800	2.825	121.45	65.200	45	3.867	103.95	1.000	44	3.200	294	30
Mark Rahbani	Parachuting – Canopy piloting	Rank	28	22	22	25	19	21	29	22	25	22	32	22	294	30

=== Drone racing ===
Athlete	Event	Elimination round of 32	Elimination Round of 16	Elimination Quarterfinal	Double Elimination Repechage 4	Double Elimination Quarterfinal	Semifinal	Final
Athlete	Event	Position	Position	Position	Position	Position	Position	Position
David Špaček	Drone racing	3	2	3	4	did not advance		

== Archery ==
Czech Republic competed in archery.

Athlete	Event	Qualification				Elimination Match #1/2	Elimination Match #3/4	Elimination Match #5/6	Elimination Match #7/8	Semifinal	Final / BM	
Athlete	Event	Unmarked	Marked	Total Score	Rank	Opposition Score	Opposition Score	Opposition Score	Opposition Score	Opposition Score	Opposition Score	Rank
Tadeáš Kalvas	Men's recurve field archery	172	165	337	11	Herlicq (FRA); W 86–84	Andersson (SWE); L 86–96	did not advance				
Jindřiška Vaněčková	Women's recurve field archery	169	166	335	4	Bye			Čavič (SLO); L 78–87	did not advance		

== Bowling ==
Czech Republic won one silver medal in bowling.

Athlete	Event	Round of 32	Round of 16	Quarterfinal	Semifinal	Final / BM	
Athlete	Event	Opposition Score	Opposition Score	Opposition Score	Opposition Score	Opposition Score	Rank
Jaroslav Lorenc	Men's singles	Ju (RSA); W 2–0	Gonzalez (COL); W 2–1	Du (CHN); W 2–0	Fach (CAN); W 2–1	Cooley (AUS); L 1–2	Silver
Jan Macek	Men's singles	Agerbo (DEN); L 1–2	did not advance				
Jaroslav Lorenc, Jan Macek	Men's doubles		Burgos / Marquez (PUR); L 1–2	did not advance			

== Canoe marathon ==
Czech Republic competed in canoe marathon.

Athlete	Event	Heat		Final	
Athlete	Event	Time	Rank	Time	Rank
Kateřina Mílová	Short Distance	16:24.42	4	16:31.47	10
Kateřina Mílová	Long Distance			1:37:16.00	8
Petr Mojžíšek	Short Distance	14:51.84	9	15:12.07	14
Petr Mojžíšek	Long Distance			1:29:30.02	14

== Dancesport ==
Czech Republic competed in two disciplines of dancesport.

=== Latin ===
Athlete	Event	First Round		Semifinal		Final	
Athlete	Event	Points	Rank	Points	Rank	Points	Rank
Sabina Karásková, Tomáš Gál	Latin	160.42	19	did not advance			
Tereza Kučerová, George Eduard Sutu	Latin	173.42	8	173.41	8	did not advance	

=== Rock 'n' roll ===
Athlete	Event	First Round		Semifinal		Final				
Athlete	Event	Points	Rank	Points	Rank	FT	FA	A	Points	Rank
Marie Dvořáková, Jiří Jakubec	Rock 'n' roll	71.71	3	84.00	5	13.52	20.08	57.95	91.55	4

== Finswimming ==
Czech Republic competed in finswimming.

Athlete	Event	Final	
Athlete	Event	Time	Rank
Filip Látal	Men's 200m surface	1:21.78	5

== Floorball ==
Czech Republic won bronze medal in the floorball tournament.

Team	Event	Group stage				Semifinal	Final / BM	
Team	Event	Opposition Score	Opposition Score	Opposition Score	Rank	Opposition Score	Opposition Score	Rank
Czech Republic men	Men's tournament	United States; W 13–1	Finland; L 3–5	Canada; W 17–0	2 Q	Sweden; L 1–6	Latvia; W 7–3	3rd place, bronze medalist(s)

Group play

Pos	Team	Pld	W	D	L	GF	GA	GD	Pts	Qualification
1	Finland	3	3	0	0	39	3	+36	6	Semifinals
2	Czech Republic	3	2	0	1	33	6	+27	4	Semifinals
3	Canada	3	1	0	2	9	38	−29	2	Fifth place game
4	United States (H)	3	0	0	3	4	38	−34	0	Seventh place game

Source: IFF
(H) Hosts

8 July 2022; 18:15	Czech Republic	13–1 (3–0, 6–0, 4–1)	United States	BJCC East Exhibition Hall, Birmingham; Attendance: 179

IFF

9 July 2022; 12:00	Finland	5–3 (2–0, 2–1, 1–2)	Czech Republic	BJCC East Exhibition Hall, Birmingham; Attendance: 667

IFF

10 July 2022; 15:30	Czech Republic	17–0 (4–0, 7–0, 6–0)	Canada	BJCC East Exhibition Hall, Birmingham; Attendance: 204

IFF

Semifinal

11 July 2022; 09:30	Sweden	6–1 (3–0, 2–0, 1–1)	Czech Republic	BJCC East Exhibition Hall, Birmingham; Attendance: 135

IFF

Bronze medal game

12 July 2022; 10:00	Czech Republic	7–3 (1–0, 2–1, 4–2)	Latvia	BJCC East Exhibition Hall, Birmingham; Attendance: 237

IFF

== Inline hockey ==
Czech Republic won silver medal in the inline hockey tournament.

Team	Event	Group stage				Semifinal	Final / BM	
Team	Event	Opposition Score	Opposition Score	Opposition Score	Rank	Opposition Score	Opposition Score	Rank
Czech Republic men	Men's tournament	Latvia; W 5–1	Switzerland; W 16–1	Italy; L 2–3	1	France; W 7–2	United States; L 1–2 OT	Silver

== Karate ==
Czech Republic competed in karate.

Athlete	Event	Elimination round				Semifinal	Final / BM	
Athlete	Event	Opposition Result	Opposition Result	Opposition Result	Rank	Opposition Result	Opposition Result	Rank
Martina Šáchová	Women's kumite +68 kg	Lingl (USA); L 1–3	Torres (ESP); L 0–5	Berultseva (KAZ); L 1–3	4	Did not advance		7

== Kickboxing ==
Czech Republic won one bronze medal in kickboxing.

Athlete	Event	Quarterfinal	Semifinal	Final / BM	
Athlete	Event	Opposition Result	Opposition Result	Opposition Result	Rank
Petr Dvořáček	Men's K1 -75 kg	Vikšraitis (LTU); W 3–0 VP	Dubina (UKR); L 0–3 VP	Zeloni (ITA); W WO	Bronze
Klára Strnadová	Women's K1 -52 kg	Chochlíková (SVK); W 2–1 VP	Cohen (ISR); L 0–3 VP	Ivanova (UKR); W 3–0 VP	4

== Korfball ==
Czech Republic competed in the korfball tournament.

Team	Event	Group stage				Semifinal 5th–8th	
Team	Event	Opposition Score	Opposition Score	Opposition Score	Rank	Opposition Score	Rank
Czech Republic	Mixed team tournament	Chinese Taipei; L 17–21	Portugal; L 13–16	Netherlands; L 11–38	–	Suriname; L 14–18	7

== Lacrosse ==
Czech Republic competed in the lacrosse women's team tournament.

Team	Event	Group stage				7th–8th place	
Team	Event	Opposition Score	Opposition Score	Opposition Score	Rank	Opposition Score	Rank
Czech Republic women	Women's team tournament	Japan; L 10–23	Australia; L 8–16	United States; L 6–25	4	Haudenosaunee; L 8–13	8

== Muaythai ==
Czech Republic competed in muay thai.

Athlete	Event	Quarterfinal	Semifinal	Final / BM	
Athlete	Event	Opposition Result	Opposition Result	Opposition Result	Rank
Viktorie Bulínová	Women's -54 kg	Thiner (USA); L 27–30	did not advance		
Jakub Klouda	Men's -91 kg	Baker (USA); L 28–29	did not advance		

== Orienteering ==
Czech Republic won two medals in orienteering. Czech Republic sent full team of four athletes to compete in orienteering.

Athlete	Event	Final	
Athlete	Event	Result	Rank
Vojtěch Král	Men's sprint	15:10	11
Tomáš Křivda	Men's sprint	14:29	Bronze
Denisa Kosová	Women's sprint	17:17	18
Tereza Janošíková	Women's sprint	15:18	Silver
Vojtěch Král	Men's middle	39:15	13
Tomáš Křivda	Men's middle	38:38	10
Denisa Kosová	Women's middle	DSQ	
Tereza Janošíková	Women's middle	43:20	9
Denisa Kosová; Vojtěch Král; Tomáš Křivda; Tereza Janošíková	Mixed team relay	48:08	4

== Parkour ==
Czech Republic competed in parkour.

Athlete	Event	Qualification		Final	
Athlete	Event	Result	Rank	Result	Rank
Adéla Měrková	Women's freestyle	20.5	2	19.0	4
Martin Chromeček	Men's speedrun	21.94	3	22.03	4

== Squash ==
Czech Republic competed in squash.

Athlete	Event	Round of 32	Round of 16 Plate	Quarterfinal Plate	Semifinal Plate	Plate Final	Round of 16	Quarterfinal	Semifinal	Final / BM	
Athlete	Event	Opposition Result	Opposition Result	Opposition Result	Opposition Result	Opposition Result	Opposition Result	Opposition Result	Opposition Result	Opposition Result	Rank
Jakub Solnický	Men's tournament	Jarota (POL); W 2–1	Advanced to main brackets				Kandra (GER); L 0–5	did not advance			
Martin Švec	Men's tournament	Azaña (ARG); L 1–2	Bye	Farkas (HUN); L 0–2	did not advance		did not advance				
Anna Serme	Women's tournament	Tycova (GER); L 1–2	Koskinen (FIN); W 2–1	Kostiukova (UKR); W 2–0	Blatt (CAN); W 3–1	Tovar (COL); L 0–3	did not advance				

== Roller Speed Skating ==
=== Road Speed Skating ===
One athlete from Czech Republic competed in road speed skating.

==== Point race ====
Athlete	Event	Final	
Athlete	Event	Point in Race	Rank
Michal Prokop	Men's point race	0	11

==== Elimination race ====
Athlete	Event	Final	
Athlete	Event	Time	Rank
Michal Prokop	Men's point race	ELIM	9

=== Road Speed Skating ===
One athlete from Czech Republic competed in track speed skating.

==== Point elimination race ====
Athlete	Event	Final	
Athlete	Event	Points in Race	Rank
Michal Prokop	Men's point race	0	9

==== 1000 m sprint ====
Athlete	Event	Preliminary Round		Semifinal		Final		Rank
Athlete	Event	Time	Rank	Time	Rank	Time	Rank	Rank
Michal Prokop	Men's 1000m sprint	1:25.132	3	1:25.053	6	did not advance		11

==== Elimination race ====
Athlete	Event	Final	
Athlete	Event	Time	Rank
Michal Prokop	Men's elimination race	–	DNF

== Water skiing ==
Czech Republic competed in water skiing.

=== Freestyle ===
Athlete	Event	Premilinary Round				Final			
Athlete	Event	Pass 1	Pass 2	Result	Rank	Pass 1	Pass 2	Result	Rank
Martin Kolman	Men's trick	3810	6520	10330	4	4160	6070	10230	4

=== Slalom ===
Athlete	Event	Preliminary Round		Final	
Athlete	Event	Result	Rank	Result	Rank
Daniel Odvárko	Men's slalom	5.00/55/18.25	10	did not advance	
