= Inline hockey at the 2022 World Games =

- Venue: Birmingham CrossPlex
- Dates: 8–12 July 2022
- No. of events: 1

The inline hockey competition at the 2022 World Games took place in July 2022, in Birmingham, Alabama, United States, at the Birmingham CrossPlex. Originally scheduled to take place in July 2021, the Games were rescheduled for July 2022 as a result of the 2020 Summer Olympics postponement due to the COVID-19 pandemic.

== Participating nations ==
- Canada
- Colombia
- Czech Republic
- France
- Italy
- Latvia
- Switzerland
- United States

== Medal table ==
* Host nation (United States)

Rank	Nation	Gold	Silver	Bronze	Total
1	United States*	1	0	0	1
2	Czech Republic	0	1	0	1
3	France	0	0	1	1
Totals (3 entries)		1	1	1	3

== Medalists ==
Event	Gold	Silver	Bronze
Men's tournament	United States; Derrick Bunett; Jack Combs; Joseph DiMartino; Peter DiMartino, Jr. Brandon Hawkins; Peter Kavaya; Tyler Kraft; Michael Maczynski; Travis Noe; Brett Onlinger; William Pascalli; Troy Redmann; Garret Ross; Nathan Sigmund	Czech Republic; Jakub Bernad; Daniel Brabec; Aleš Chamrád; Martin Fiala; Oscar Flynn; Dominik Frodl; Petr Kafka; Filip Kuťák; Marek Loskot; Tomáš Rubeš; Patrik Šebek; Štěpán Turek; Jan Vyoral; Mikuláš Zbořil	France; Louis Allo; Baptiste Bouchut; Théo Faucherand; Théo Fontanille; Karl Gabillet; Valentin Gonzalez; Lambert Hamon; Joan Kerkhove; Benoit Ladonne; Damien Lafourcade; Maxime Langlois; Elliot Machy; Sébastien Pasquier; Enzo Renou
