= Orienteering at the 2022 World Games =

- Venue: Birmingham–Southern College, Oak Mountain State Park, Railroad Park
- Dates: 15–17 July
- No. of events: 5
- Competitors: 77 from 24 nations

The orienteering competition at the 2022 World Games took place in July 2022, in Birmingham, United States, at the Birmingham–Southern College, Oak Mountain State Park and Railroad Park. Originally scheduled to take place in July 2021, the Games were rescheduled for July 2022 as a result of the 2020 Summer Olympics postponement due to the COVID-19 pandemic.

== Participating nations ==
- Australia (4)
- Austria (4)
- Belgium (1)
- Brazil (4)
- Canada (4)
- Czech Republic (4)
- Denmark (4)
- Egypt (1)
- Estonia (4)
- Finland (2)
- Germany (4)
- Great Britain (4)
- Hong Kong (4)
- Hungary (1)
- Latvia (1)
- Lithuania (2)
- Netherlands (1)
- Norway (5)
- New Zealand (1)
- Poland (4)
- Switzerland (5)
- Sweden (5)
- Ukraine (4)
- United States (4)

== Medal table ==
Rank	Nation	Gold	Silver	Bronze	Total
1	Switzerland	3	1	1	5
2	Norway	1	1	1	3
3	New Zealand	1	0	0	1
4	Sweden	0	2	1	3
5	Czech Republic	0	1	1	2
6	Great Britain	0	0	1	1
Totals (6 entries)		5	5	5	15

== Medalists ==
=== Men ===
Event	Gold	Silver	Bronze
Sprint	Tim Robertson; New Zealand	Martin Regborn; Sweden	Tomáš Křivda; Czech Republic
Middle distance	Kasper Fosser; Norway	Matthias Kyburz; Switzerland	Martin Regborn; Sweden

=== Women ===
Event	Gold	Silver	Bronze
Sprint	Simona Aebersold; Switzerland	Tereza Janošíková; Czech Republic	Elena Roos; Switzerland
Middle distance	Simona Aebersold; Switzerland	Karolin Ohlsson; Sweden	Ingrid Lundanes; Norway

=== Mixed ===
Event	Gold	Silver	Bronze
Sprint relay	Switzerland; Simona Aebersold; Joey Hadorn; Matthias Kyburz; Elena Roos	Norway; Victoria Hæstad Bjørnstad; Håvard Eidsmo; Kasper Fosser; Ingrid Lundanes	Great Britain; Cecilie Andersen; Ralph Street; Jonny Crickmore; Charlotte Ward
