= Gyeongui Line Forest Park =

Park in Seoul, South Korea

- Interactive map of Gyeongui Line Forest Park
- Type: Linear park
- Location: Seoul, South Korea
- Coordinates: 37.5593°N 126.9248°E

Gyeongui Line Forest Park (Korean: 경의선숲길) is a linear park built on a former rail line in Hongdae, Seoul. After the Gyeongui Line was partially reconstructed underground, Gyeongui Line Forest Park was created in its place.

It is also known as Yeontral Park (연트럴파크), which is a Konglish portmanteau of Mapo District's Yeonnam-dong and New York's Central Park.

== Gallery ==
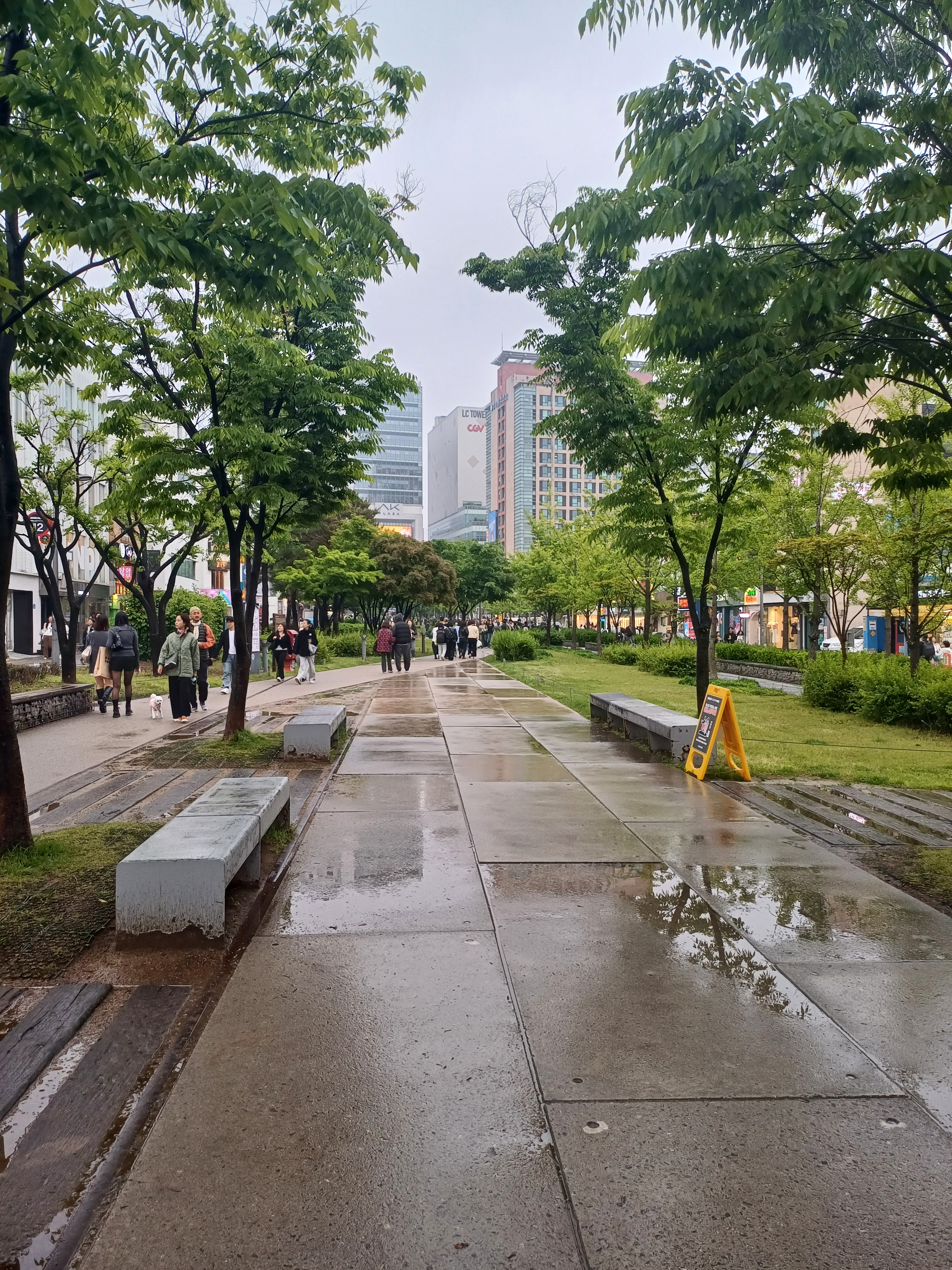

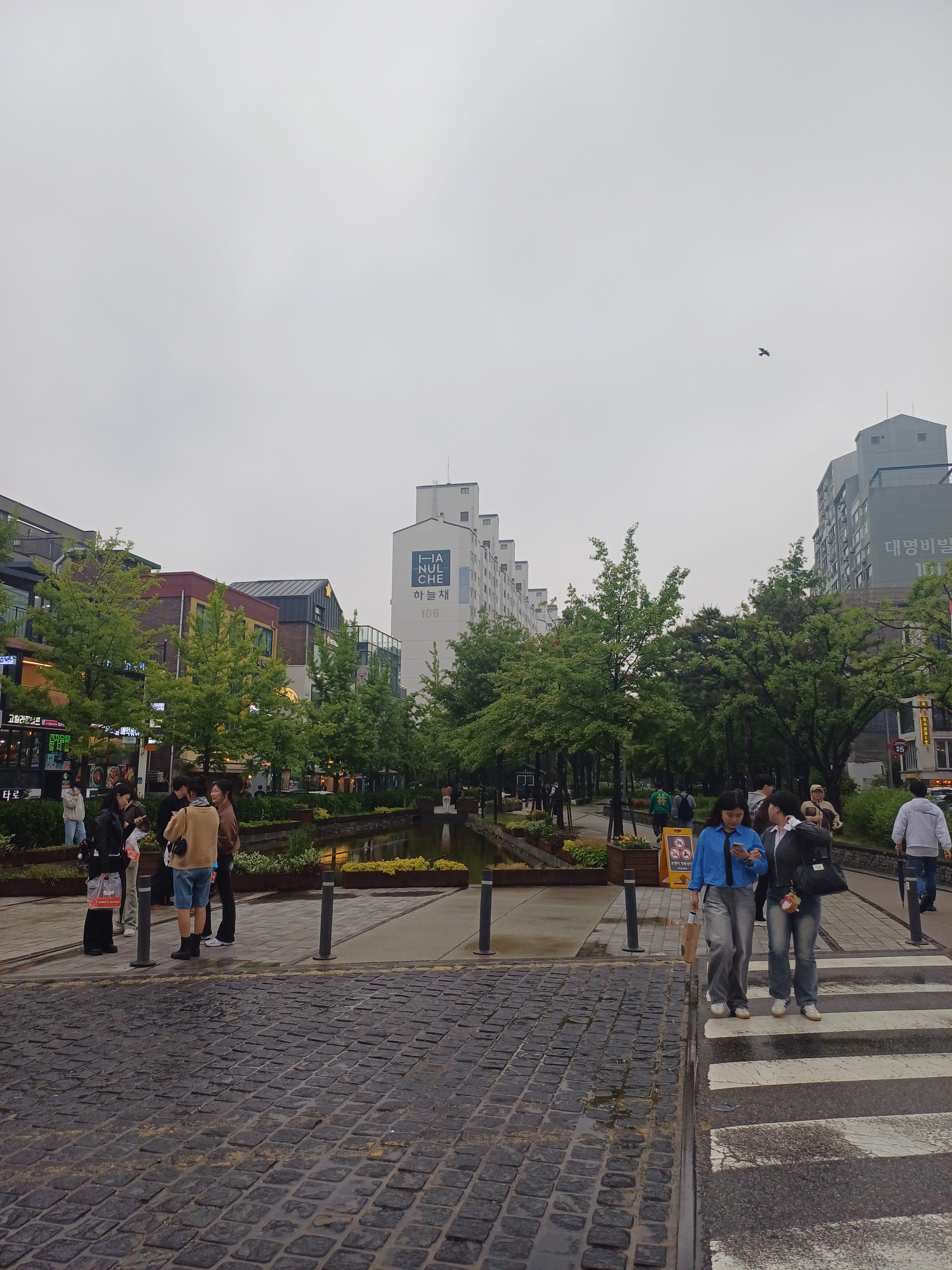

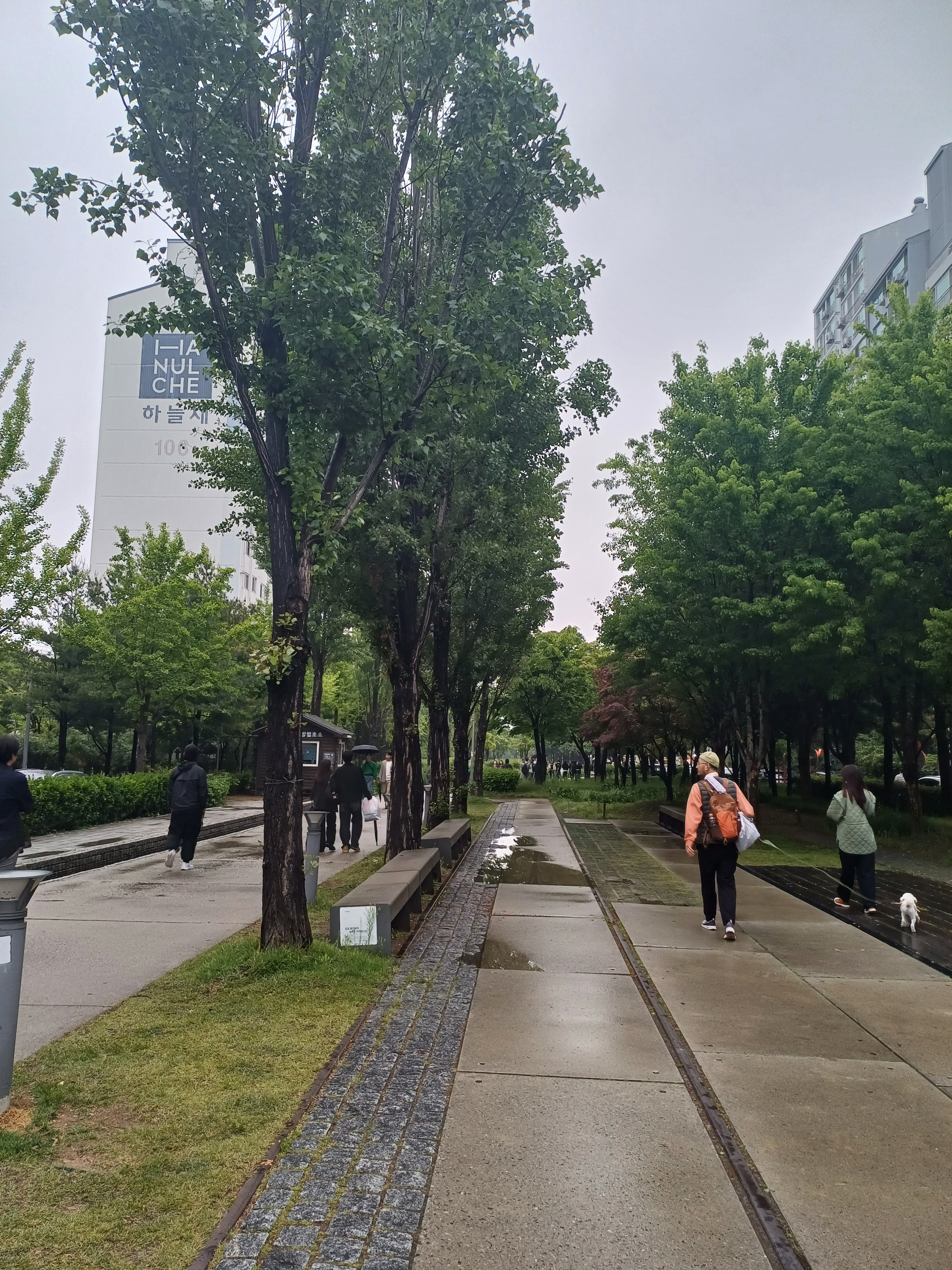

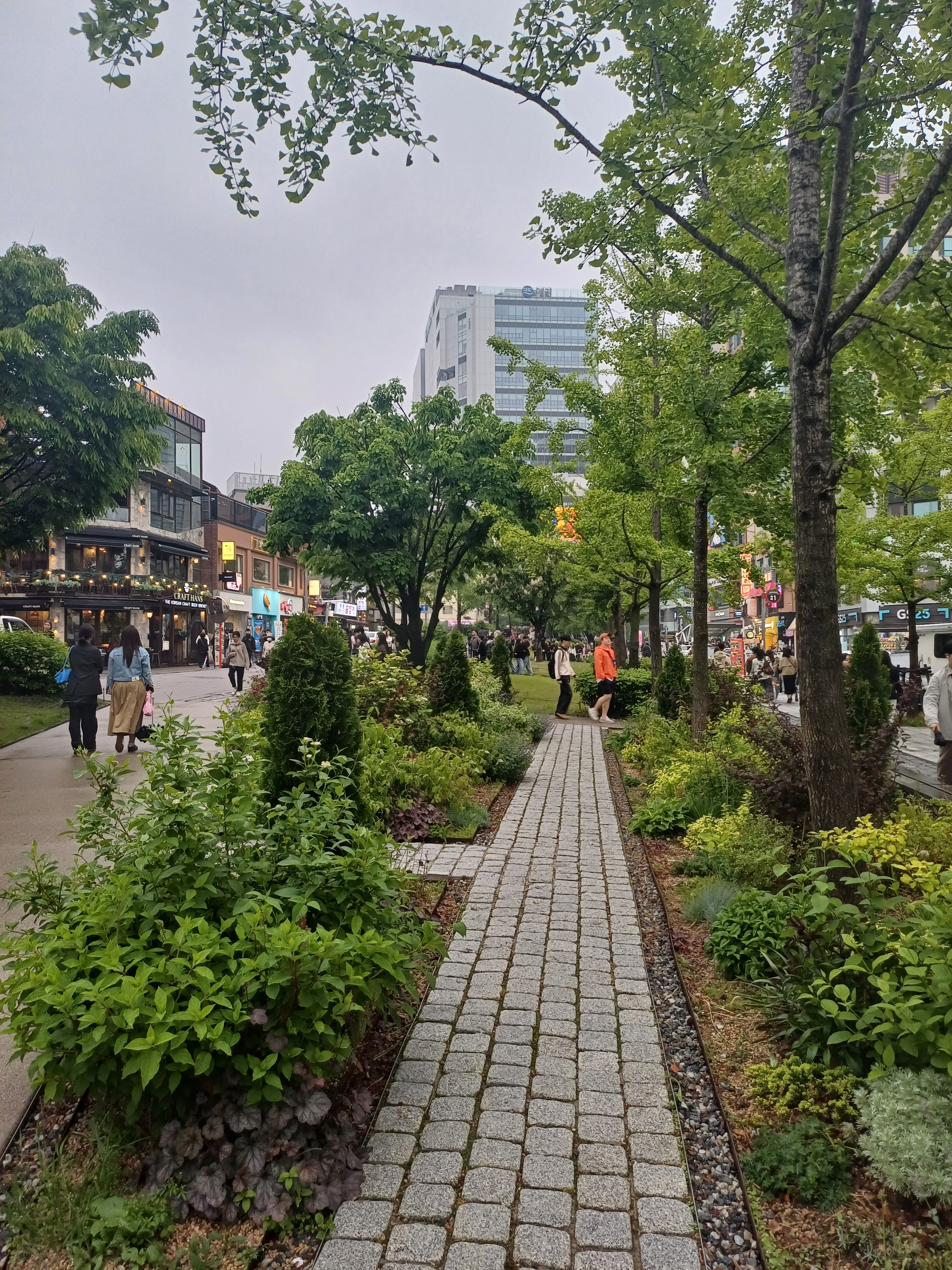

== See also ==
- The High Line
- The 606
- Gyeongchun Line Forest Park
