= Dodder Park =

Suburban linear park in Dublin, Ireland

Coordinates: 53.27819°N 6.34832°W

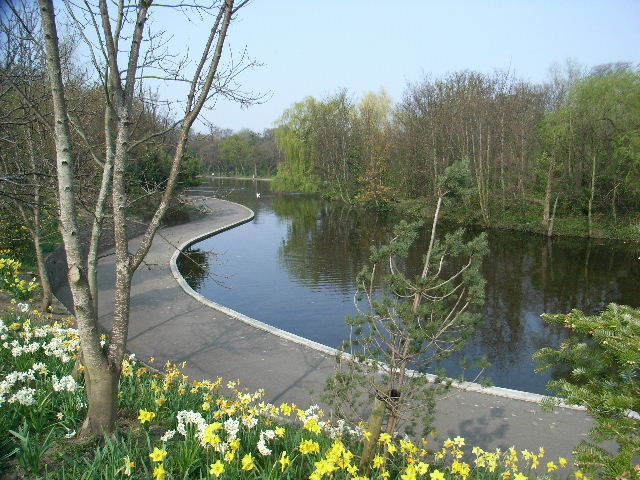
Dodder Valley Park pond in 2007

The Dodder Valley Linear Park (Irish: Páirc Ghleann na Dothra) or simply Dodder Valley Park is a suburban linear park in South Dublin, Ireland.

== Location ==
The roughly 100ha. park is located in the south-west of Dublin, stretching from the Old Bawn Bridge in Tallaght to Rathfarnham, with most of the parkland located to west of the M50 motorway.

== Attractions ==
=== Fishing ===
The River Dodder is a popular fishing spot for anglers looking to catch Brown trout or Sea trout, and permission to fish on the dodder is provided by the Dodder Anglers Club. The season opens from 17 March to 30 September every year. Anglers come to Ireland every year to fish the river.

=== Dodder Greenway ===
The Dodder Greenway is a 17 km long greenway linking the Bohernabreena reservoirs at Glenasmole to Sir John Rogerson's Quay in the city centre that runs through Dodder Valley Park. It began construction in 2019 with the final phase of on-road sections from Kiltipper to Old Bawn road due to be completed in late 2025.

=== Heritage ===
==== Balrothery Weir ====
The City Weir was constructed in the 1242 by monks of St. Thomas' Abbey, Thomas St. to divert water from the River Dodder to supplement the water supply from the River Poddle, which at the time supplied most of Dublin's drinking water.

In 1240, the monks had diverted flow of the Poddle to nearby their abbey leading to conflict with the Archbishop of Dublin in Christ Church Cathedral, which also drew its water from the Poddle. To remedy the issue, the monks constructed a weir at Balrothery and watercourse which ran under the Tallaght road and joined the Tymon stream into the city to increase the flow of the Poddle.

The watercourse proved to be a valuable strategic asset and weapon of leverage over the coming centuries. During the civil war between royalists and parliamentarians in 1649, royalist commander James Butler, Marquess of Ormonde, used control of the watercourse during his siege of Dublin to cut off the water supply to the city.

It continued to be used to supply the city with drinking water until 1775.

=== Wildlife ===
It is also a haven for wildlife: among the species to be seen are kingfisher, dipper, grey heron, sparrowhawk, and fox.
