= Linear park =

Long strip of naturally occurring land for recreation

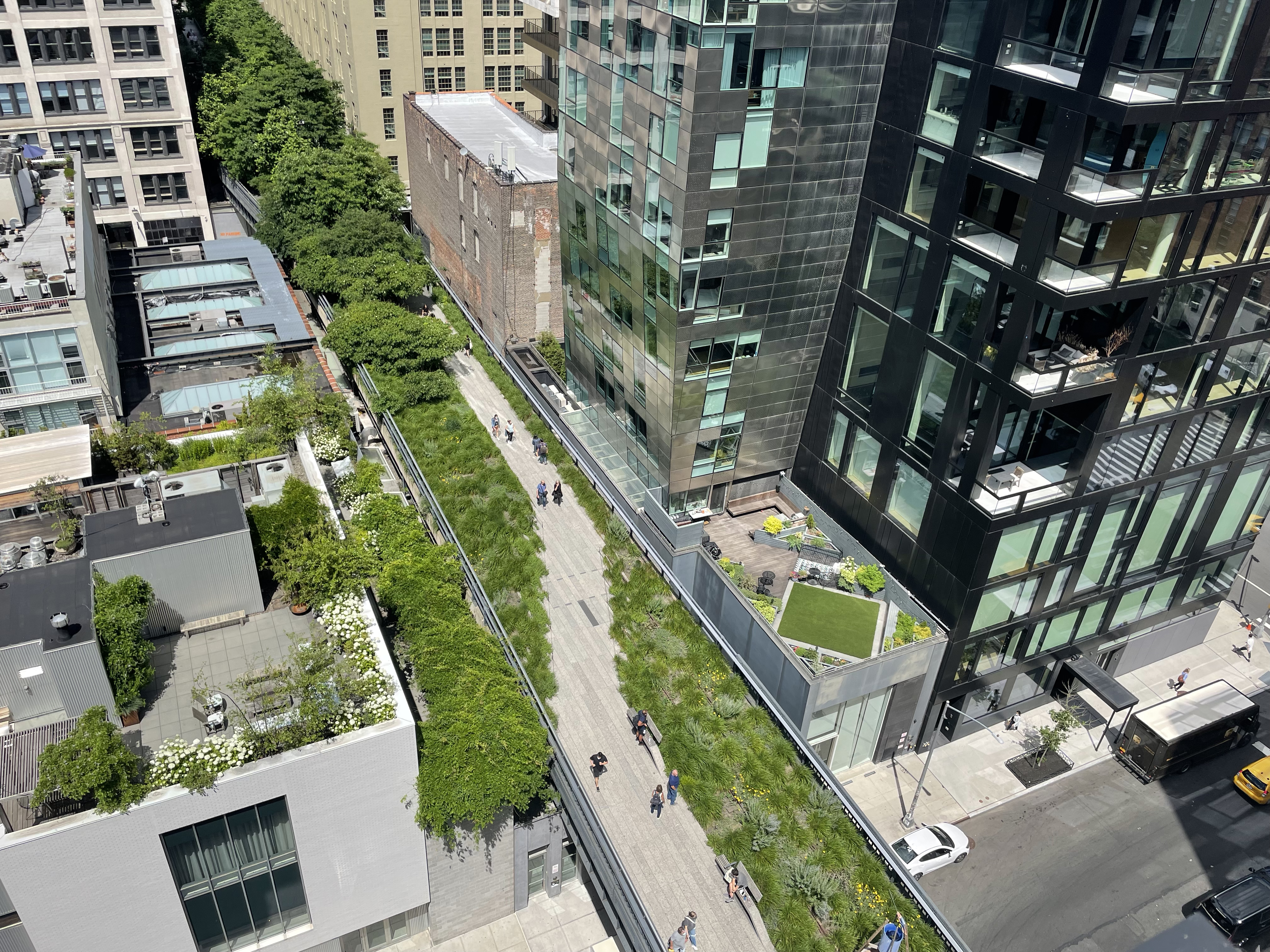
The High Line Park in Manhattan is an aerial greenway, modeled on the Promenade plantée in Paris.

A linear park is a type of park that is significantly longer than it is wide. (Note: There is no dictionary definition for the term in the full Oxford Dictionary of English. "Linear: Resembling a line; very narrow in proportion to its length, and of uniform breadth." (Oxford Dictionary of English) The term linear park seems to have begun to be used on a regular basis in the 1960s (Google Ngram Viewer). The earliest usage in Britain was in reference to the idea of a River Thames "linear national park", in Time on the Thames by Eric Samuel De Maré (Architectural Press, 1952) (Ngram). Google Ngram Viewer, however, indicates a few earlier examples, including from the US in 1939 (Supplementary report of the Urbanism Committee to the National Resources Committee, Volume 2. United States. National Resources Committee. Research Committee on Urbanism. Clarence Addison Dykstra. U.S. Govt. 1939). It may also have been used in 1873, but Ngram didn't provide the source(s).) Linear parks are strips of public land running along canals, rivers, streams, defensive walls, electrical lines, highways and shorelines. Examples of linear parks include everything from wildlife corridors to river-ways to trails, capturing the broadest sense of the word. Other examples include rail trails ("rails to trails"), which are disused railroad beds converted for recreational use by removing existing structures. Commonly, these linear parks result from the public and private sectors acting on the dense urban need for open green space. Linear parks stretch through urban areas, coming through as a solution for the lack of space and need for urban greenery. They also effectively connect different neighborhoods in dense urban areas as a result, and create places that are ideal for activities such as jogging or walking. Linear parks may also be categorized as greenways. In Australia, a linear park along the coast is known as a foreshoreway. When being designed, linear parks appear unique as they are planned around the public's opinion of how the space will affect them.

== North America ==
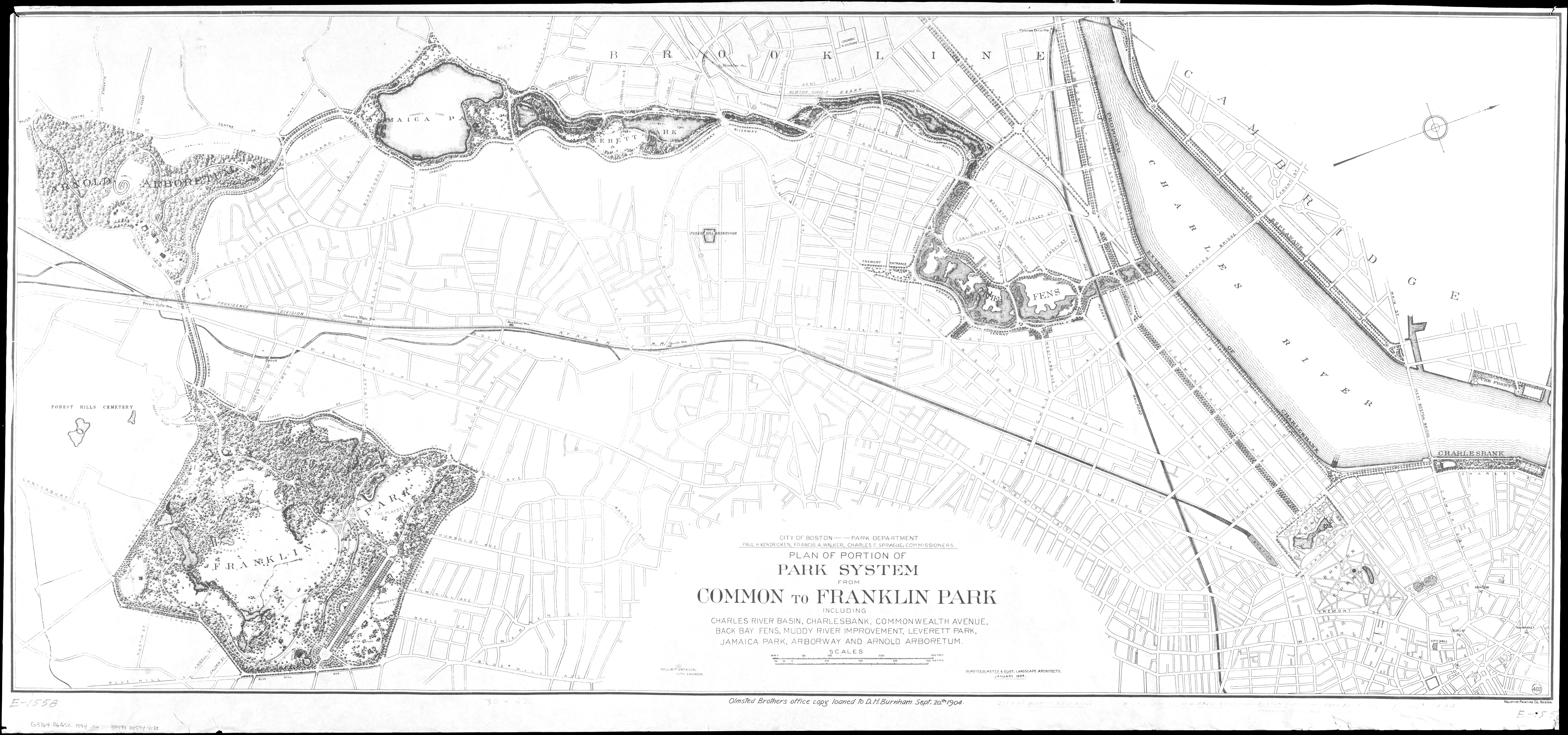
Plan of the Emerald Necklace, Boston, US, in 1894

Possibly the earliest example is the Emerald Necklace, which consists of a 1,100-acre (4.5 km^{2}) chain of parks linked by parkways (a broad, landscaped highway) and waterways in Boston and Brookline, Massachusetts, U.S. The name comes from the way the planned chain appears to hang from the "neck" of the Boston peninsula. This system of linear parks was designed by Frederick Law Olmsted to connect the Boston Common and Public Garden (1837) to Franklin Park (Boston), also known as the "crown jewel" of Olmstead's work in Boston. The project began around 1878 with efforts to clean up and control the marshy area which later became the Back Bay and the Fens. In 1880, Olmsted proposed that the Muddy River be included in the park plan as the current dredged into a winding stream and was directed into the Charles River. Olmsted's vision of a linear park of walking paths along a gentle stream connecting numerous small ponds was complete by the turn of the century, but never completed the section to Boston Harbor. The subsequent development of the automobile industry and roads severely disrupted the original concept.

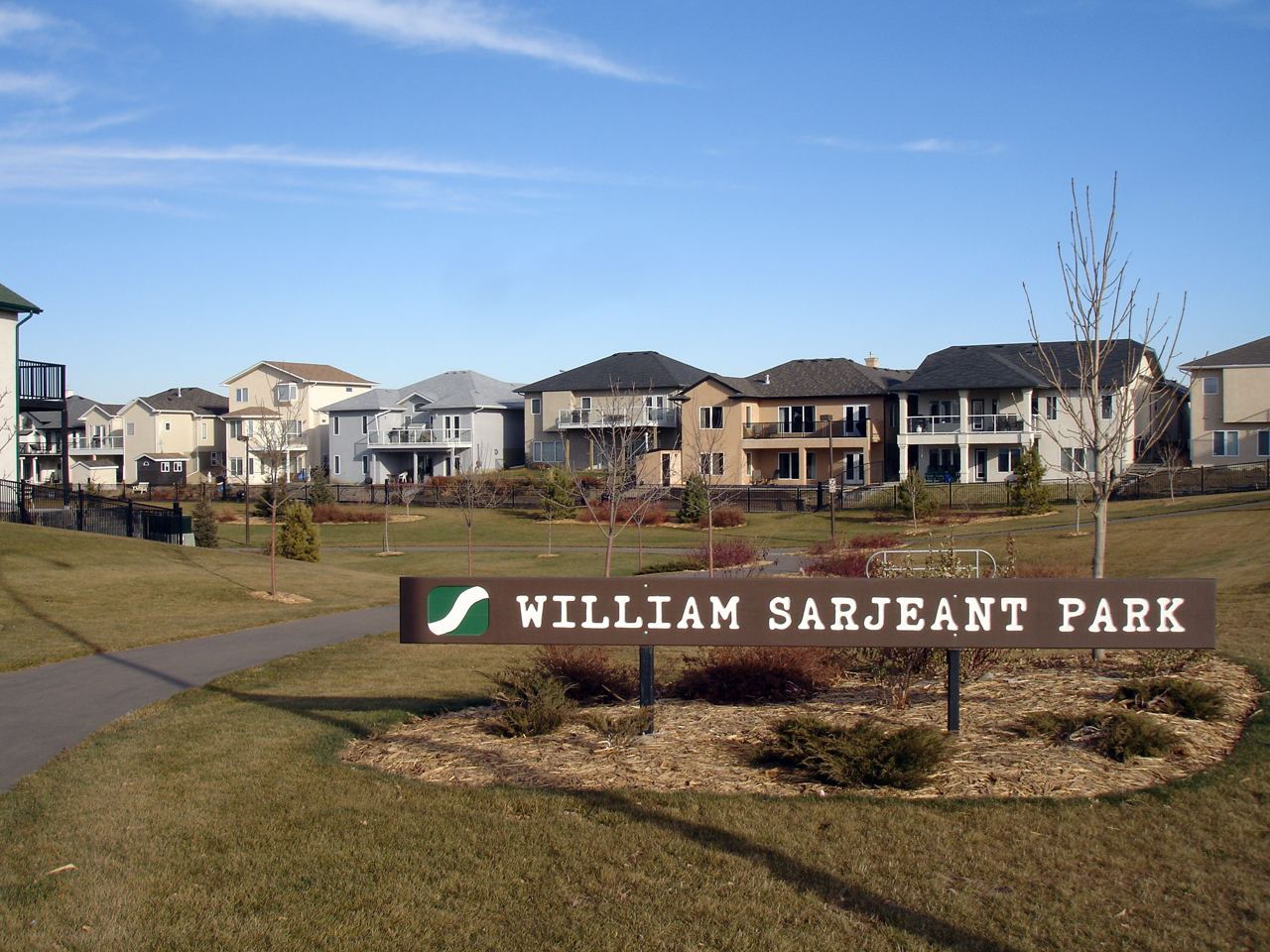
William Sarjeant Park, a linear park in the Willowgrove neighborhood of Saskatoon, Saskatchewan, Canada

In some cities, many linear parks run through residential areas. In this case, the front of the house will face the streets, while the back faces a small linear park containing a pathway, trees and grass connecting different areas together. There are examples of this in some US cities and some Canadian cities, such as Saskatoon, Canada. Houses connected with linear parks are more common in suburban and rural areas where space is much less in-demand.

In the 21st century, prevalent examples of linear parks that have seen high levels of visitors are the High Line in New York City and the Bloomingdale Trail in Chicago. The High Line in New York City is a 1.4-mile (2.3 km) rail trail and greenway, having been built on a portion of a defunct rail line as well as constructed to have greenery all throughout. Like its Paris counterpart Promenade Plantee, the High Line has been transformed into a linear park that allows for activities such as sight-seeing and exercise, while being elevated. The High Line's annual budget is funded almost entirely by park visitors, though it is operated by the New York City Department of Parks and Recreation license agreement. Bloomingdale Trail in Chicago is the longest linear park in the Western Hemisphere, and the second-longest linear park in the world, with a length of 2.7 miles (4.3 km), just under Paris' Promenade Plantee at 2.9 miles (4.7 km). Bloomingdale Trial was created by converting an elevated portion of the former Bloomingdale railway to this linear park, which features trees, flowers, plants, shrubbery, grass, light posts, and benches throughout. The greenway transverses through the neighborhoods of Logan Square, Humboldt Park, and West Town.

=== Atlanta Beltline ===
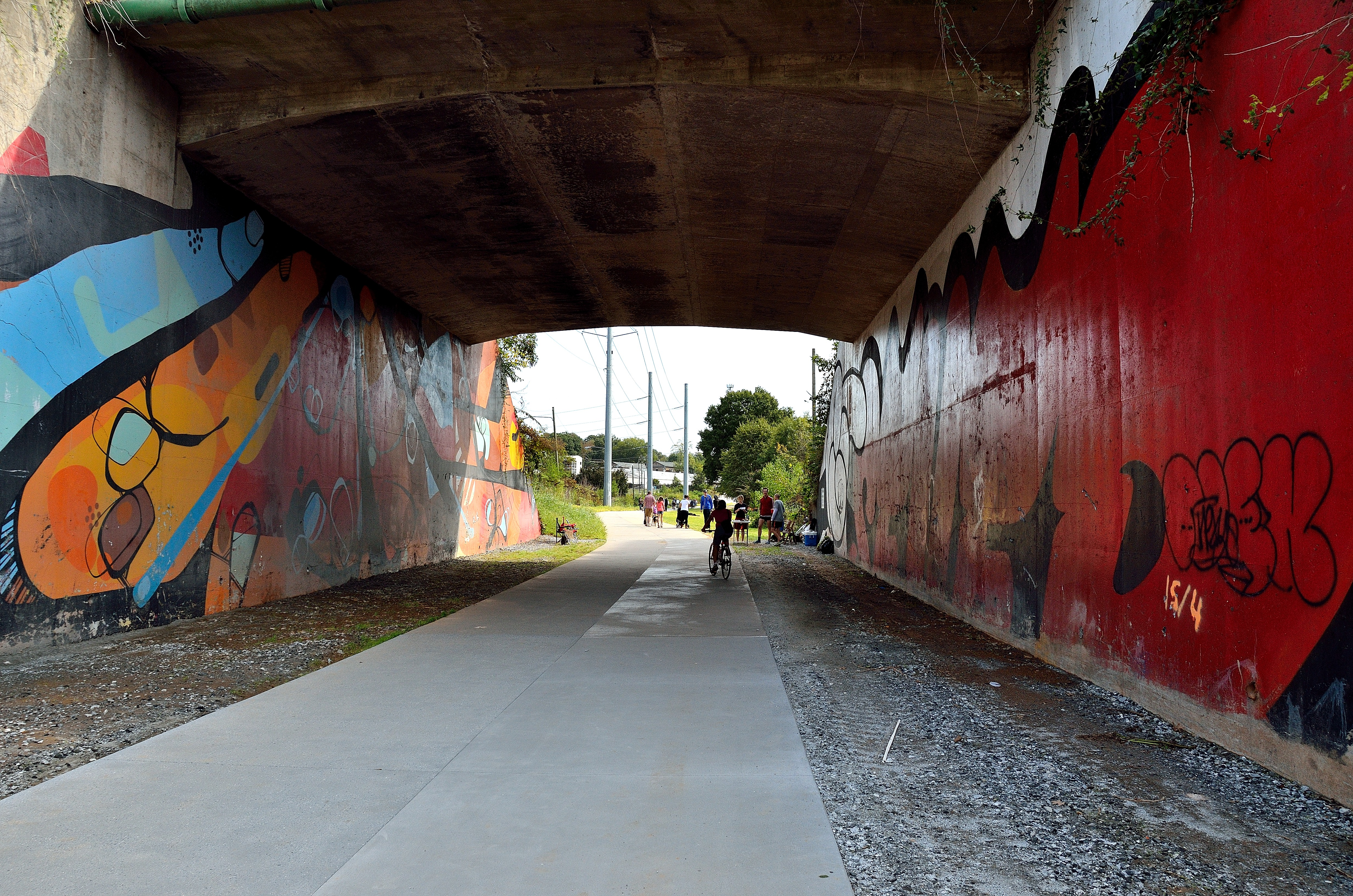
Unique art found on the Atlanta Beltline

A linear park system under development in Atlanta, Georgia, is the Beltline. Part of the foundation for this project consisted of reclaiming 22 miles (35 km) of unused rail trails. Totaling approximately 33 miles (53 km), the Beltline will include a trail and light rail line on the existing tracks instead of a road. The vision of the Beltline is to attempt to balance out resident demographics within the city, allowing for all associated to the Beltline to benefit.

=== Beltline Trail, Toronto ===
The 9-kilometre (5.6 mi) Beltline Trail opened in 1989 by using the part of the 27-kilometre (17 mi) Toronto Belt Line Railway Don Loop, which was last used by Canadian National Railway in the late 1960s. A few years of a public battle over the use of the former rail corridor ended in 1972 and 1988 after the City of Toronto bought most of the remaining unused sections.

== Europe ==
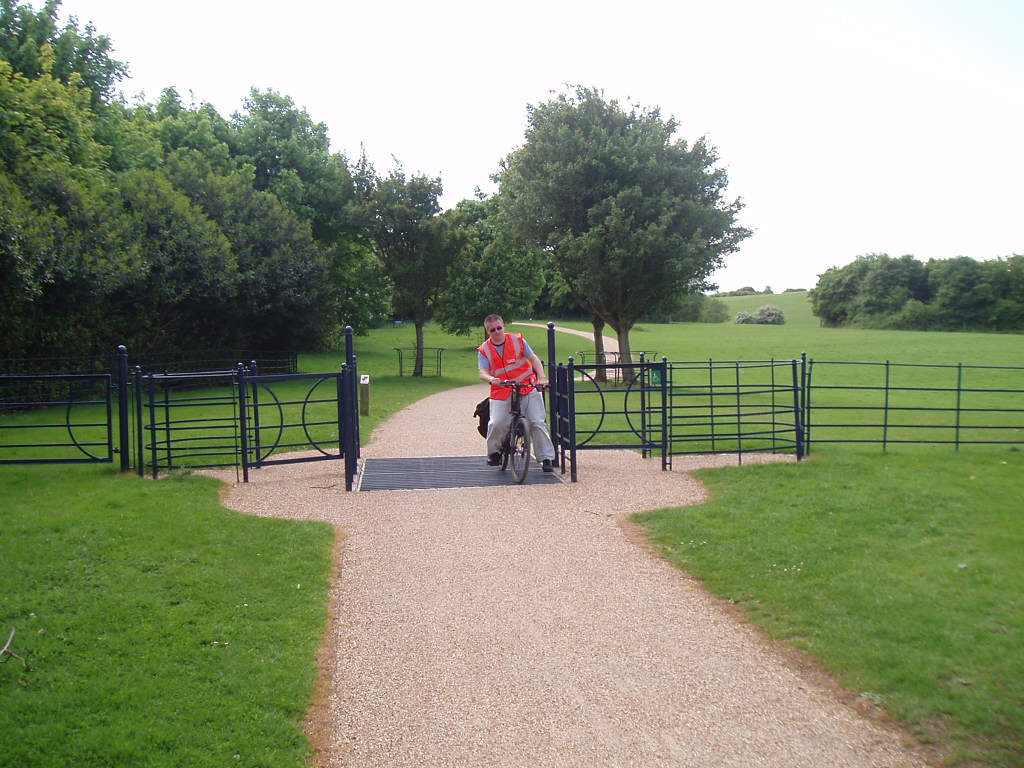
Part of one of Milton Keynes's linear parks, showing cyclists crossing a cattle grid on National Cycle Route 51

In England, linear parks have also been created around waterways, especially in cities where the terrain is such that rivers and brooks have significant flood plains. Such land cannot sensibly be used for urban development and so it is set aside as a civic amenity. Milton Keynes makes extensive use of linear parks along the flood plains of the Great Ouse and its tributaries. In the UK, Milton Keynes ranked highest in a national comparison of open urban areas available to residents.

In Greater London, Essex and Hertfordshire, the Lee Valley Park is a 10,000-acre (40 km^{2}) linear park, stretching for 26 miles (42 km), much of it green spaces running along the flood plains of the River Lea from the River Thames to Ware, through areas such as Stratford, Clapton, Tottenham, Enfield, Walthamstow, Cheshunt, Broxbourne, and Hoddesdon in an area renowned as the Lea Valley. Greater London's largest park, Lee Valley Park is more than four times the size of Richmond Park, extending beyond Greater London's borders into the neighboring counties of Hertfordshire and Essex.

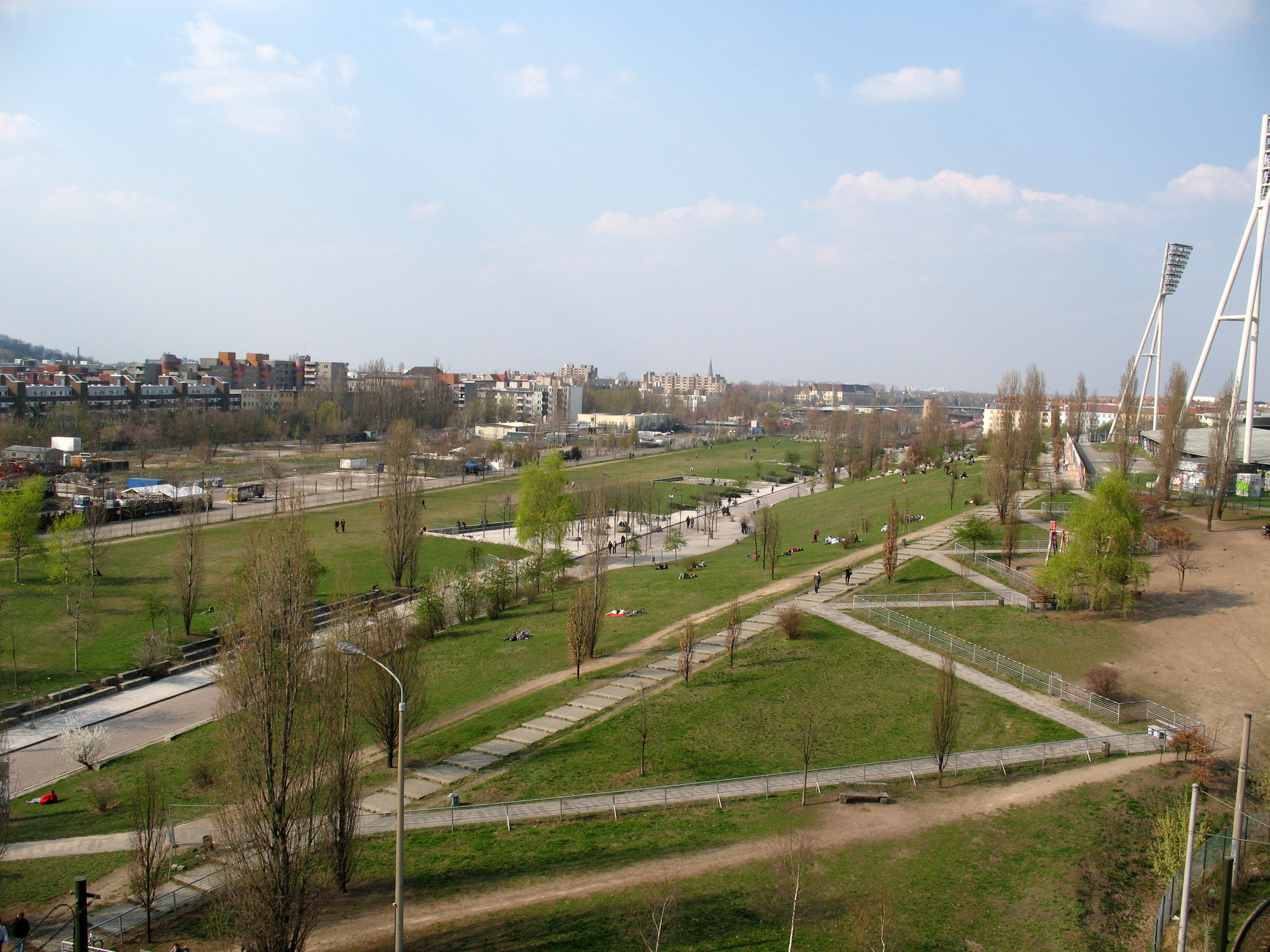
Mauerpark in Berlin, Germany

A more recent example of a linear park is the Berlin Mauerpark, which was built on a part of the former Berlin Wall area and its adjacent former death strip.

In Kraków (Poland), Planty Park encircles the Stare Miasto (Old Town), where the Medieval city walls used to stand until the early 19th century. The park has an area of 21 ha (52 acres) and a length of 4 km (2.5 mi). It consists of a chain of thirty smaller gardens designed in varied styles and adorned with numerous monuments and fountains. The park forms a scenic walkway popular with Cracovians. In summer, sprinkled with ponds and refreshment stalls, it is a cool and shady retreat from the nearby bustling streets.

== Asia ==
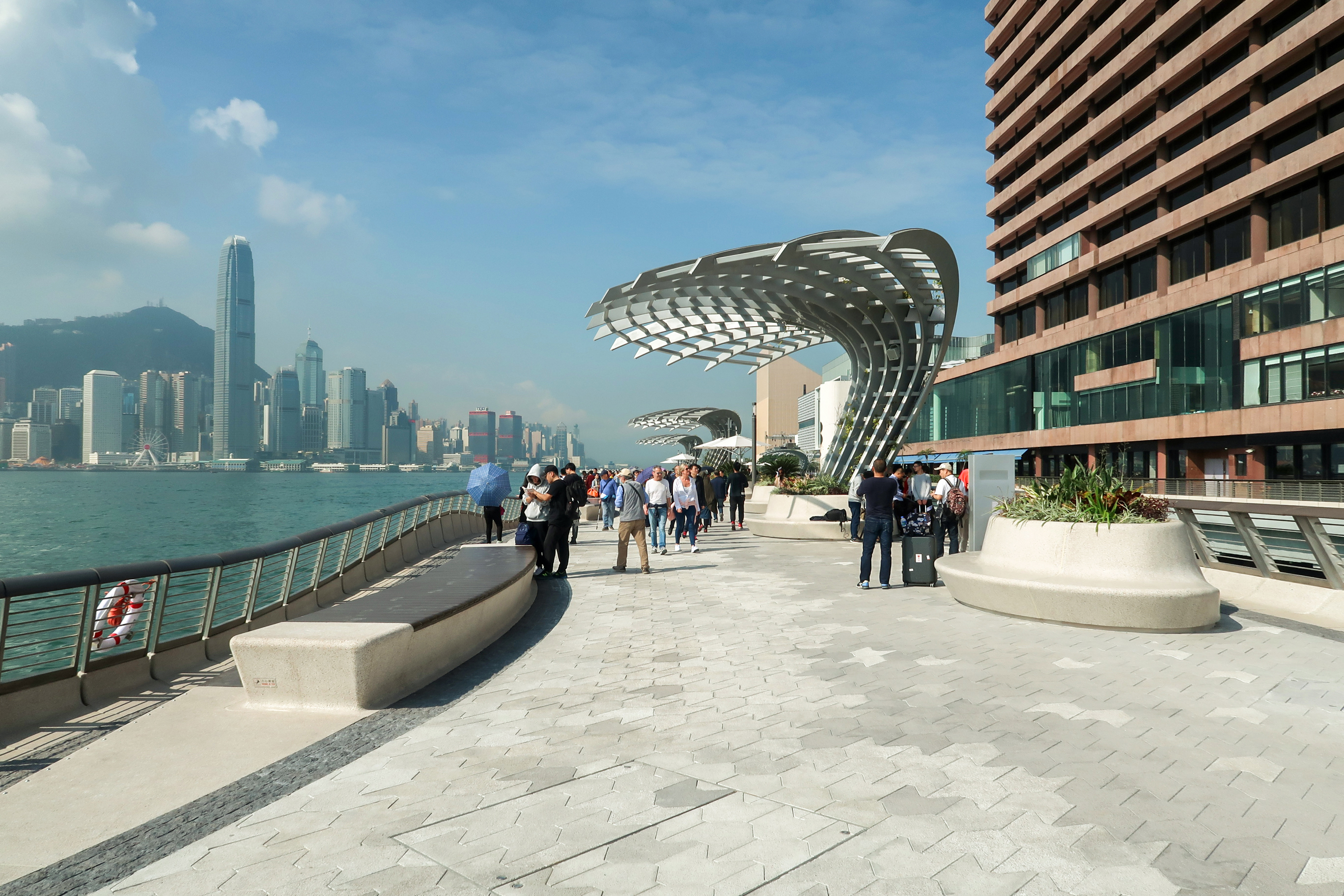
View of the walkway (Avenue of Stars, Hong Kong)

In Hong Kong, a prominent example of a linear park is the Avenue of Stars. Located at the waterfront surrounding East Tsim Sha Tsui, the Avenue of Stars is a 440-metre (0.27-mile) promenade offering scenic views to the public. As a public amenity, the park provides much needed urban space to the dense city of Hong Kong. The walking road itself is dedicated to famous Hong Kong celebrities, and as such is an attractive tourist area lined with souvenir stalls at some sections.

In addition to the waterfront location, the Avenue of Stars provides visitors a stand to the Symphony of Lights, the world's largest light and sound show. It is also around this area that the Star Ferry can be observed.

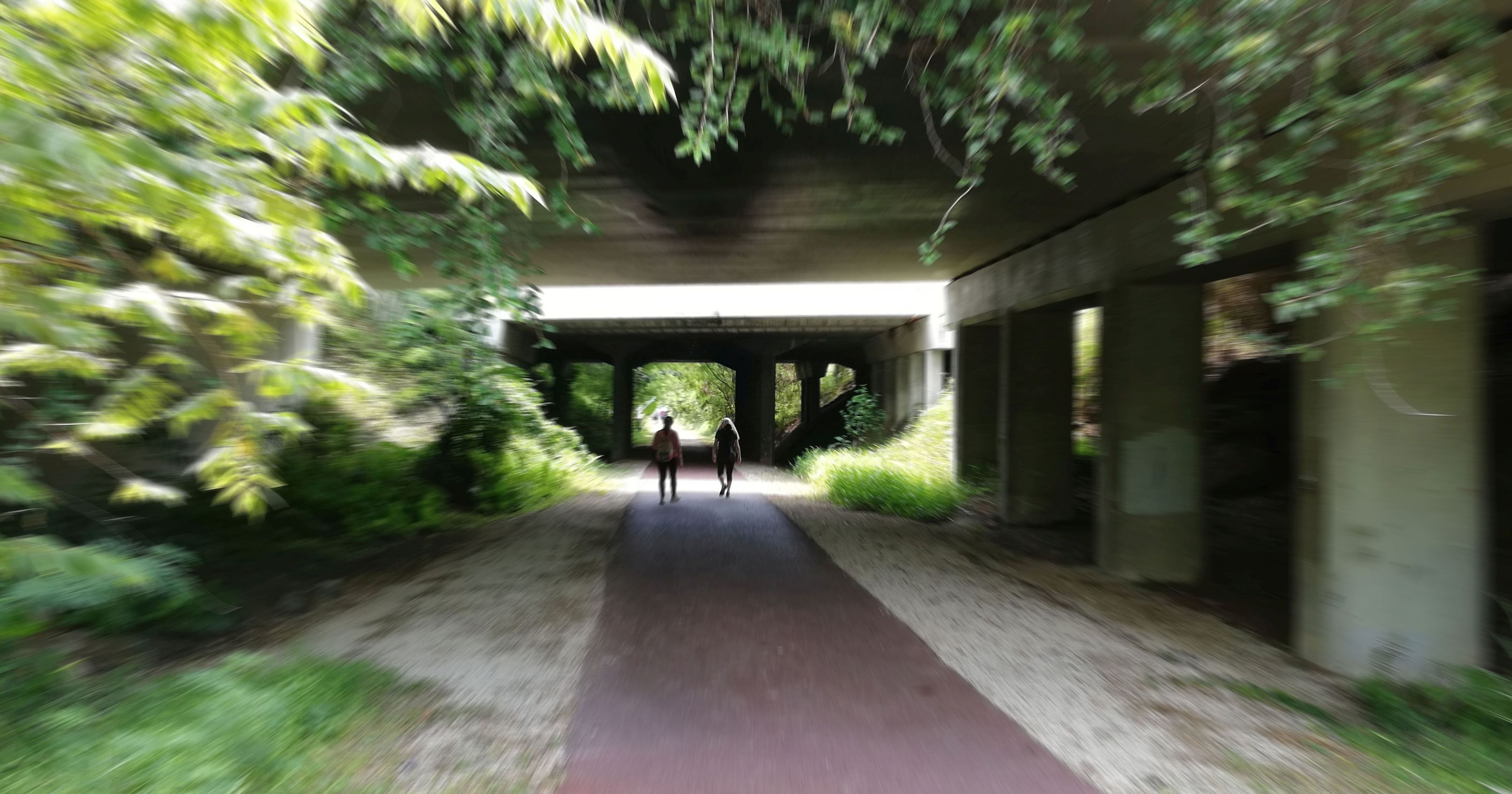
Picture of Rail Corridor, Singapore

In Singapore, wild growth and shrubbery over took a former KTM rail line. Convincing the government of its amenity value, the citizens of Singapore were able to turn the KTM railway in to a rail trail that now runs for 24 km (14.9 mi) and offers access to Singaporean wildlife as well as an outdoor trail for a variety of activities.

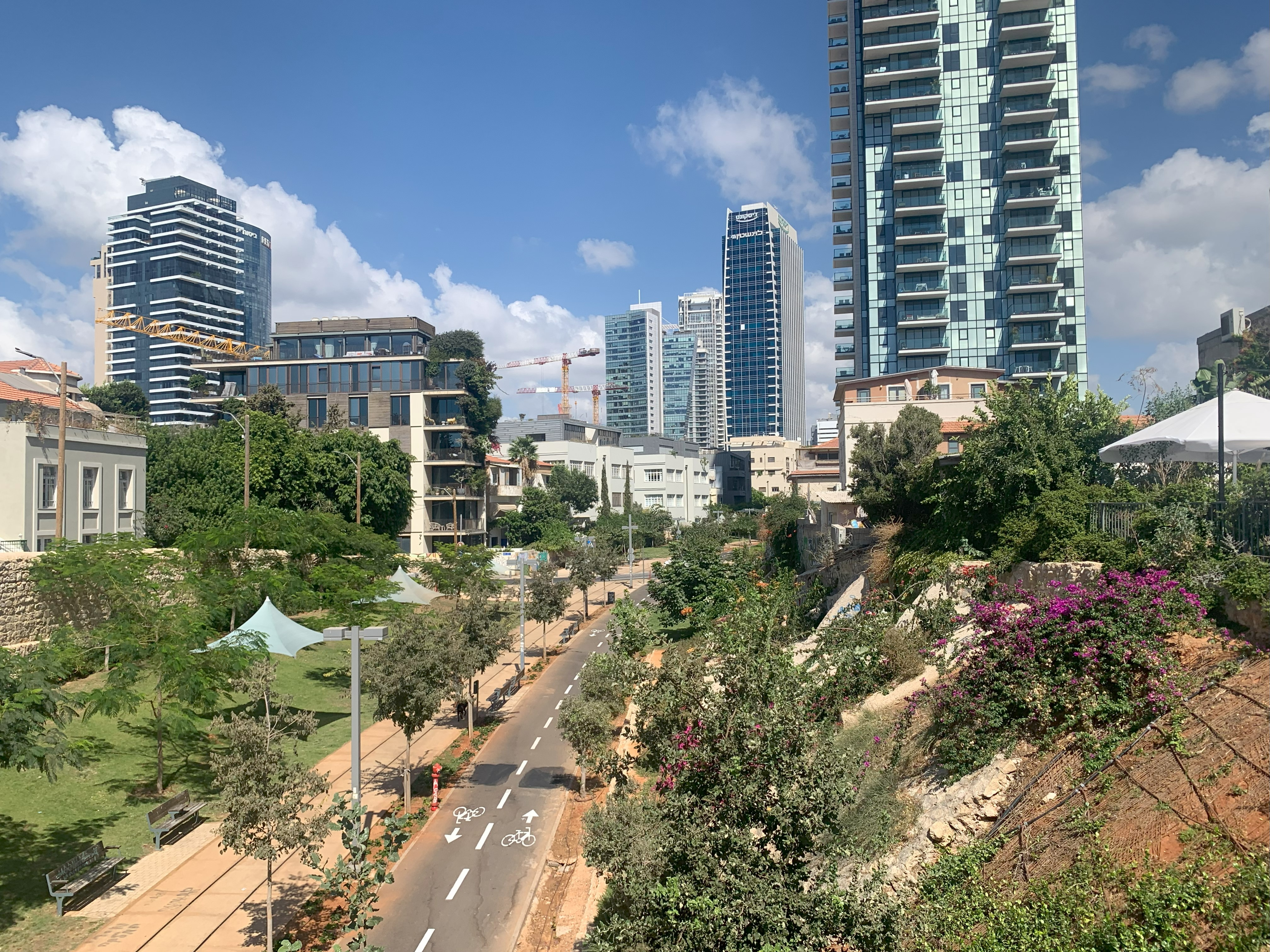
Railway park, Tel Aviv, Israel

In Tel Aviv (Israel), a linear park was established on the former route of the Ottoman railway between Jerusalem and Jaffa. Following the disuse of the railway the area was used as a parking lot. In 2020 the park was opened to the public.

In the Philippines, the Iloilo River Esplanade is the country's longest linear park, with a total length of 9.29 km (5.77 mi). It began as part of the Iloilo River Rehabilitation Project in Iloilo City, later evolving into a popular venue for jogging and leisure, and is now lined with mangroves and other forms of riverine biodiversity. A similar project in Metro Manila, the Pasig River Esplanade, is a planned 25-kilometre (16-mile) linear park, of which about 1.1 km (0.68 mi) have been completed in several sections.

== List of linear parks ==
=== Europe ===
==== Belgium ====
- Parc de la Senne, Zennepark, Brussels

==== France ====
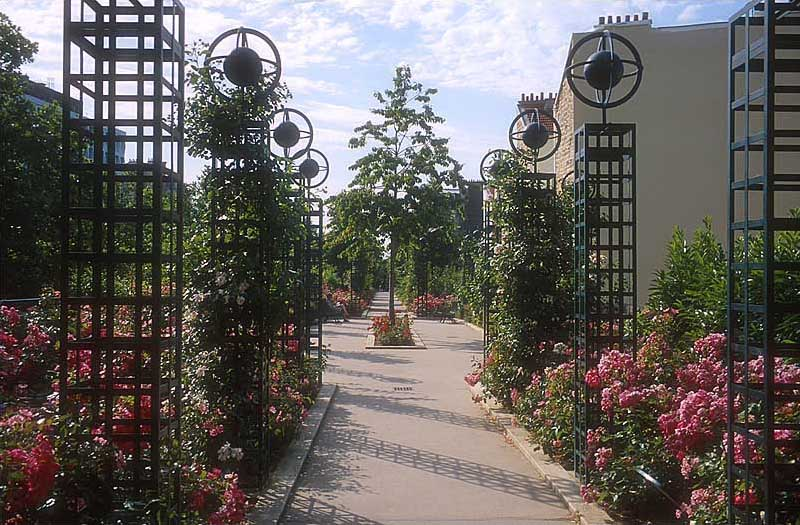
Promenade Plantée, a 4.7 km (2.9 mi) elevated linear park built on top of obsolete railway infrastructure in the 12th arrondissement of Paris, France.

- Promenade Plantée, Paris

==== Germany ====
- Mauerpark, Berlin
- Mittellandkanal, Hannover
- Kattenbrook-Park, Hannover

==== Ireland ====
- Dodder Park, Dublin
- Lansdowne Valley Park, Dublin

==== Portugal ====
- Tagus Linear Park, Póvoa de Santa Iria (River Tagus),

==== Romania ====
- Parcul Liniei Linear Park, Bucharest. A four-kilometre urban linear park in Bucharest. The project will see a four-kilometre swathe of the city transformed into a lush urban garden.

==== Spain ====
- Sagera Linear Park, Barcelona
- Parc de la Rambla de Sants, Barcelona
- Madrid Río, Madrid
- Turia Gardens (Jardín del Turia), Valencia

==== United Kingdom ====
- Brampton Valley Way, Northamptonshire and Leicestershire, England
- Eastside City Park, Birmingham, England
- Hogsmill River Park, London, England
- Lee Valley Park, East London, England
- Mile End Park, East London, England
- Ouzel Valley Park, Milton Keynes, England (about 8 kilometres (5.0 mi)).

=== North America ===
==== Canada ====
- Beltline Linear Park and West Toronto Railpath, Toronto, Ontario
- Grand Concourse (St. John's), Newfoundland, a walkway system with linear parks
- Meewasin Trail, Saskatoon, Saskatchewan
- Parc linéaire de la rivière Saint-Charles, Québec City, Québec
- Parc Linéaire Le P'tit Train du Nord, Saint-Jérôme - Mont-Laurier, Quebec
- Strathcona Linear Park, Vancouver, British Columbia

==== United States ====
- Alewife Linear Park, Cambridge, Massachusetts
- Atlanta Beltline, Atlanta, Georgia
- Bloomingdale Trail (The 606), Chicago, Illinois
- Blue Ridge Parkway, North Carolina and Virginia
- Brickell Key Baywalk, Miami, Florida
- Buffalo Bayou Park, Houston, Texas
- Burnham Greenway, Chicago, Illinois
- Charles River Esplanade, Boston, Massachusetts
- Chesapeake and Ohio Canal National Historical Park, Washington, D.C., West Virginia, and Maryland
- Delaware and Raritan Canal State Park, Central New Jersey
- Dequindre Cut, Detroit, Michigan
- East Boston Greenway, Boston, Massachusetts
- Eastern Parkway, Brooklyn, New York City, New York
- Elizabeth River Parkway, Union County, New Jersey
- Embarcadero, San Francisco, California
- Freeway Park, Seattle, Washington
- George Redman, East Providence, Rhode Island
- Grand Park, Los Angeles, California
- High Line, Manhattan, New York City, New York
- Hollywood Central Park, Los Angeles, California
- Hoover-Mason Trestle, Bethlehem, Pennsylvania
- Hudson River Park, Manhattan, New York City, New York
- Illinois Prairie Path, Dupage County, Illinois
- Indianapolis Cultural Trail, Indianapolis, Indiana
- James River Park System, Richmond, Virginia
- Little Sugar Creek Greenway, Charlotte, North Carolina
- Miami Riverwalk, Miami Baywalk, and future Miami River Greenway, Miami, Florida
- Midtown Greenway and trails network of Minneapolis, Minnesota
- Mosholu Parkway, The Bronx, New York City, New York
- Ocean Parkway, Brooklyn, New York City, New York
- Passaic River Parkway, Union County, New Jersey
- Pastor Willie James Ford, Sr. Linear Park, Deerfield Beach, Florida
- Pelham Parkway, The Bronx, New York City, New York
- Rahway River Parkway, Union County, New Jersey
- Rico Rossi Parkway, Salinas, California
- Riverfront Park (Arkansas River Trail), Little Rock, Arkansas
- Rose Kennedy Greenway, Boston, Massachusetts
- Rotary Trail, Birmingham, Alabama
- Salesforce Park, San Francisco, California
- San Antonio River Walk, San Antonio, Texas
- Stowe Recreation Path, Stowe, Vermont
- Sunset Dunes, San Francisco, California
- The Loop, Tucson, Arizona
- The Underline, Miami-Dade County, Florida
- Vanderbilt Motor Parkway, Queens, New York City, New York
- Walkway over the Hudson State Historic Park, Poughkeepsie and Highland, New York
- Washington & Old Dominion Railroad Regional Park, Northern Virginia

==== Mexico ====
- Línea Verde, Aguascalientes
- Parque Lineal, Puerto Vallarta

=== Argentina ===
- Paseo del Bajo, Buenos Aires

=== Brazil ===
- Parque Linear Tiquatira, São Paulo

=== Asia ===
==== Hong Kong ====
- Avenue of Stars, Hong Kong

==== Singapore ====
- Rail Corridor

==== Iran ====
- Seyyed Morteza Linear Park, Kashmar

==== Israel ====
- Yarkon Park, Tel Aviv

==== Japan ====
- Odori Park, Sapporo

==== Philippines ====
- Plaza Moriones, Manila
- Camaligan River Park, Camaligan, Camarines Sur
- Iloilo River Esplanade, Iloilo City

==== Taiwan ====
- Calligraphy Greenway, Taichung

==== Thailand ====
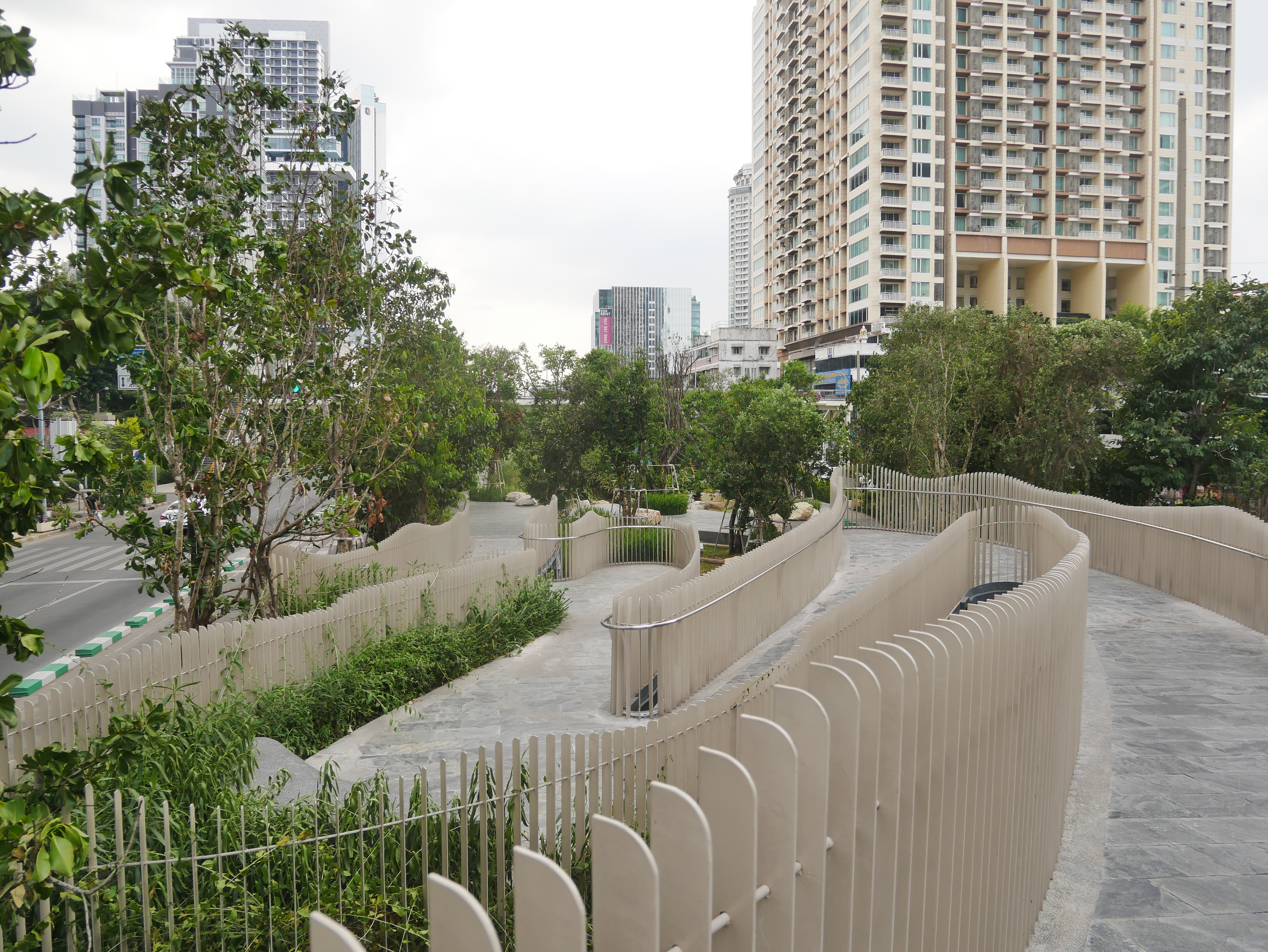
Chong Nonsi Canal Park

- Chong Nonsi Canal Park, Bangkok

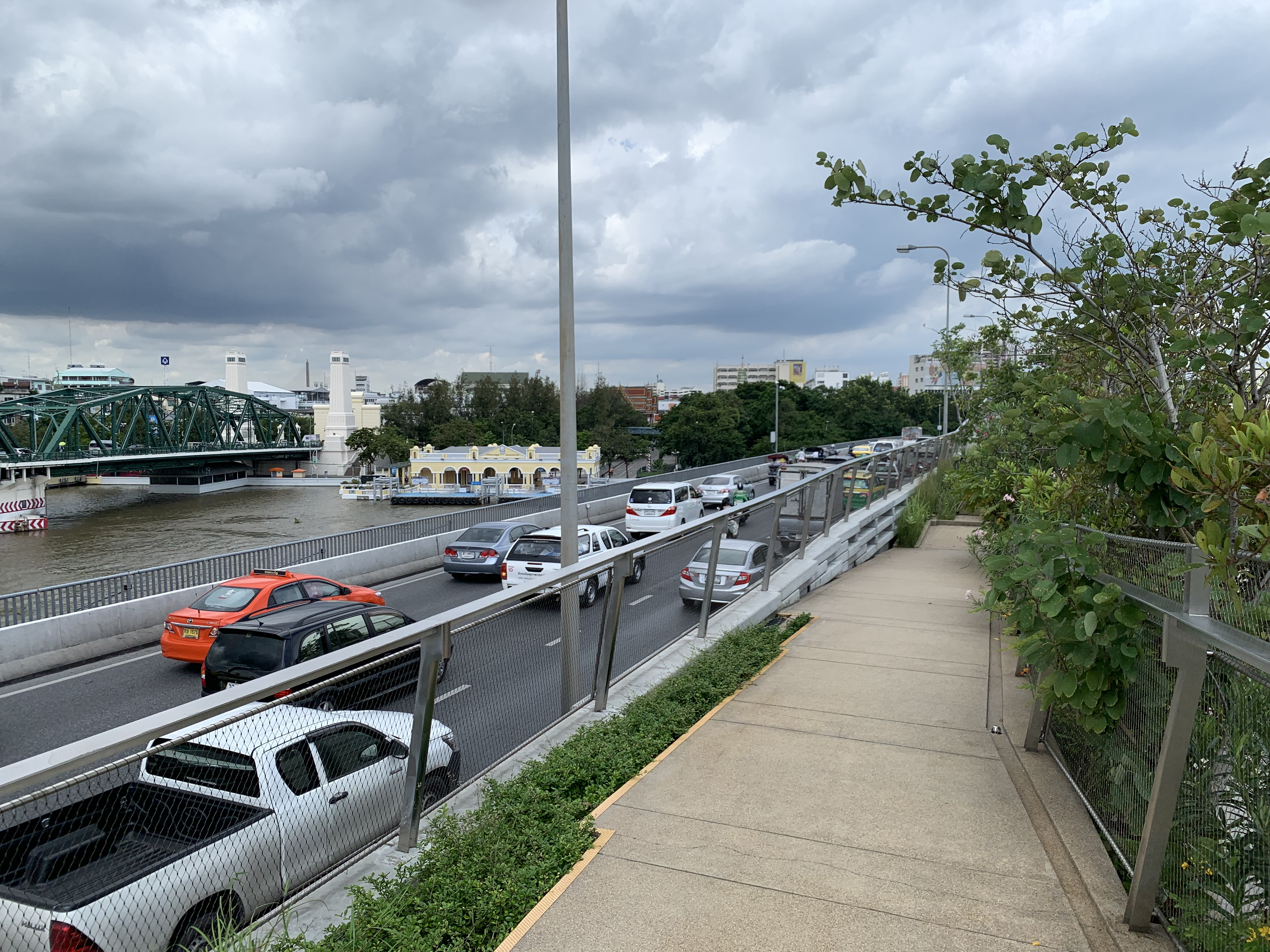
Chao Phraya Sky Park, the elevated linear park of the Phra Pok Klao Bridge, crossing the Chao Phraya River.

- Chao Phraya Sky Park, Bangkok

==== South Korea ====
- Seoullo 7017, Seoul
- Gyeongchun Line Forest Park
- Gyeongui Line Forest Park

==== United Arab Emirates ====
- Al Zorah Linear Park, Ajman

=== Australia ===
- Stirling Linear Park, near Adelaide
- Sturt River Linear Park, near Adelaide
- The Goods Line, Sydney
- Torrens Linear Park, Adelaide

== See also ==
- Boardwalk
- Footpath
- Foreshoreway
- Greenway (landscape)
- Promenade
- Trail
- Urban park
- Wildlife corridor
