= Rotary Trail =

Half-mile linear park in downtown Birmingham, Alabama

Coordinates: 33°30′48″N 86°48′03″W

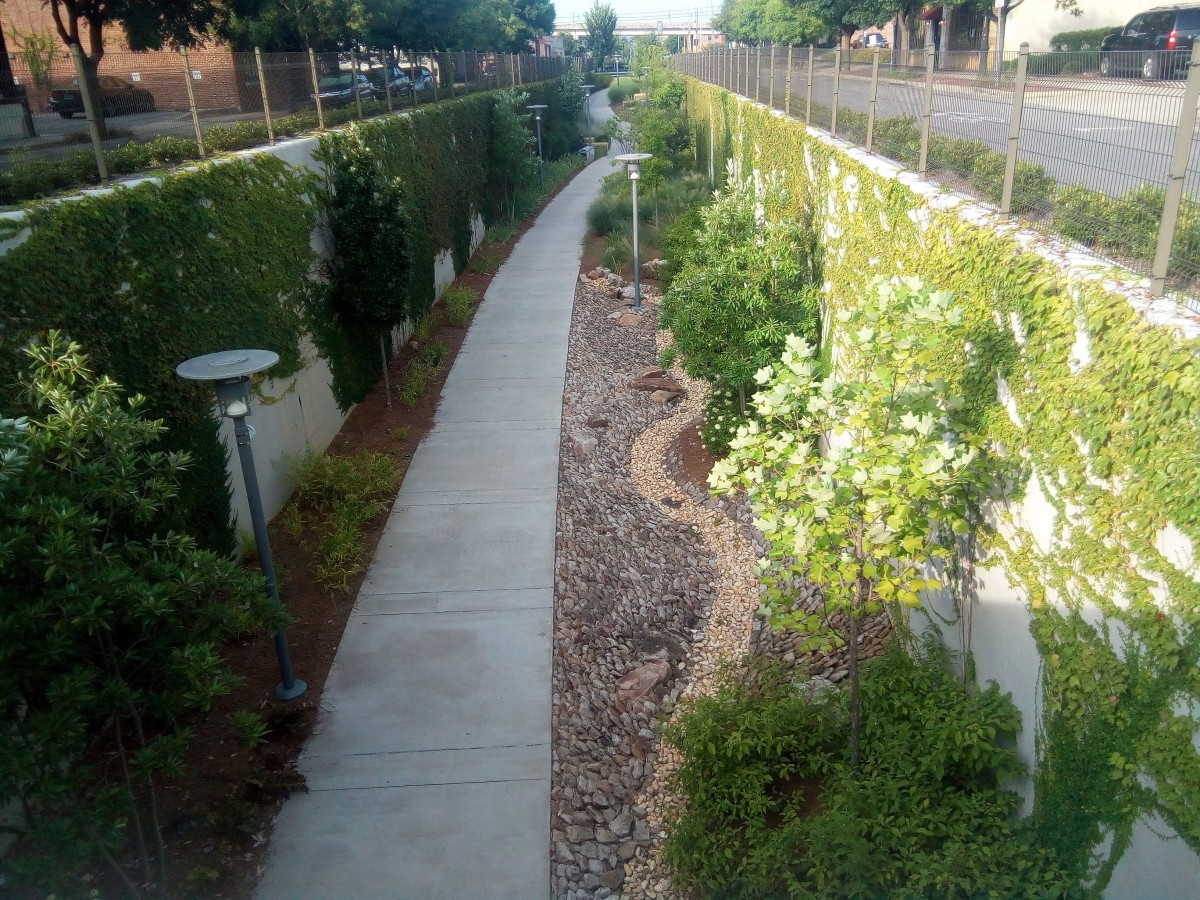
- Rotary Trail
- Location: 2098 1st Ave S Birmingham, Alabama
- Completed: 2016
- Use: Pedestrian

Rotary Trail is a half-mile linear park in downtown Birmingham, Alabama. The trail was predominantly funded by the Birmingham Rotary Club in honor of their centennial anniversary. The trail runs from 20th Street to 24th Street along First Avenue South and connects two major downtown areas: the 19-acre Railroad Park on one side, and Sloss Furnaces, a National Historic Landmark, on the other side. It opened in 2016.

The entrance to the trail has a 46-foot-tall sign that reads, "Rotary Trail in the Magic City." The sign was modeled after the historical "Birmingham the Magic City" sign that previously existed in the city.

== History ==
The Rotary Club contributed to the project with a $2.5 million commitment to a major public project in recognition of their centennial year in 2013. The project aimed to transform a railroad cut into a pedestrian greenspace. In addition to the major gift from the Rotary Club, the City of Birmingham contributed $2 million from a 2012 federal TIGER grant for drainage, streetscape and infrastructure improvements to enhance the project. Additional funding came from the Freshwater Land Trust, the Jefferson County Department of Health, the University of Alabama at Birmingham, the Community Foundation of Greater Birmingham, the Goodrich Foundation, the Susan Mott Webb Foundation, the Alabama Department of Transportation, Alabama Power, and CSX.

A dedication ceremony for the Rotary Trail and sign lighting was held on April 6, 2016. In November 2019, a public sculpture titled "Frank's Table" was dedicated on the eastern end of the trail.

== Magic City sign ==
The western entrance to the trail features a sign that reads, "Rotary Trail in the Magic City." The sign is a nod to a previous Magic City sign. The sign was donated by BL Harbert International along with the donation of the raw materials from O'Neal Steel.
