= Hollywood Central Park =

Proposed park

Coordinates: 34.098180°N 118.314602°W

Hollywood Central Park is a 38-acre (15 ha) proposed linear park on a freeway cap over US Highway 101 in Hollywood, California, US.

== History ==
Hollywood Central Park was conceived by Hollywood resident Edward V. Hunt, who was inspired by the Rose Fitzgerald Kennedy Greenway in Boston and the High Line in New York City. The project was first proposed by the Hollywood Chamber of Commerce in 2006 and the non-profit advocacy group Friends of the Hollywood Park was formed in 2008.

The City of Los Angeles Department of Recreation and Parks started the park's pre-development phase in 2023.

== Funding ==
Hollywood Central Park's construction costs are estimated at $1 billion. An environmental impact study has been funded by various sources, including $1.2 million from the Aileen Getty Foundation and $1.5 million from CRA/LA Excess Bond funds. Additional fundraising activities include a yearly gala and advocacy event. The 2023 gala's theme was "Reconnecting Communities", mimicking the United States Department of Transportation's initiative of the same name.

In 2023, the city requested a federal grant from the a Department of Transportation to develop park and engineering analysis in an effort to get the park shovel-ready. $3.59 million was granted through the Infrastructure Investment and Jobs Act in 2024.

== Parkscape ==
The park would cover 38 acres (15 ha) along US 101 between the Bronson Avenue and Santa Monica Boulevard bridges.
