= Yeonnam-dong =

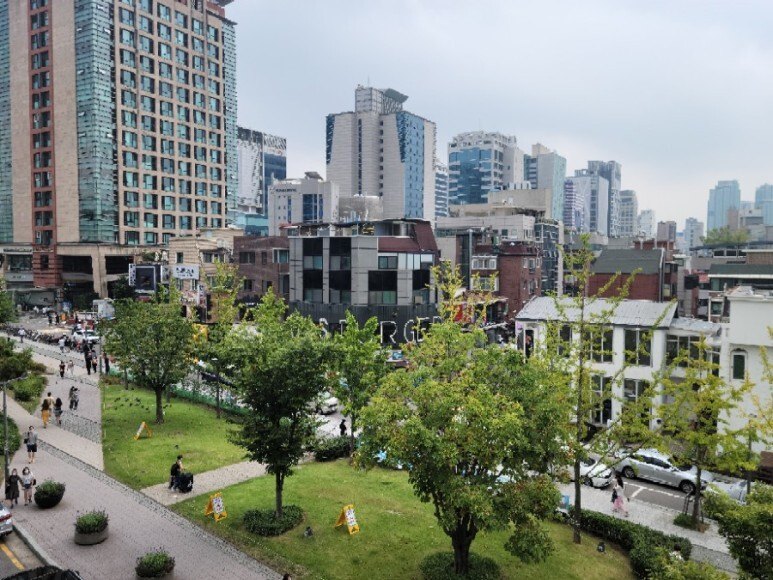
- Rooftop view of Yeonnam-dong
- Interactive map of Yeonnam-dong
- Coordinates: 37°33′45″N 126°55′19″E
- Country: South Korea

Area
  - Total: 0.65 km^{2} (0.25 sq mi)

Population (2001)
  - Total: 18,904
  - Density: 29,000/km^{2} (75,000/sq mi)

Korean name
- Hangul: 연남동
- Hanja: 延南洞
- RR: Yeonnam-dong
- MR: Yŏnnam-dong

Yeonnam-dong (Korean: 연남동) is a dong (neighbourhood) of Mapo District, Seoul, South Korea. The neighbourhood that was once simply a home to locals, has now emerged into a trendy location for many aspiring artists and designers. As more unique shops and cafes began to fill the streets and alleyways, the area gradually became a very popular area for young university students and tourists. The most popular attraction in Yeonnam-dong is Gyeongui Line Forest Park where the Gyeongui Line train formerly ran before it was moved underground.

== See also ==
- Administrative divisions of South Korea
