= Ingrid Lundanes =

Norwegian orienteering competitor

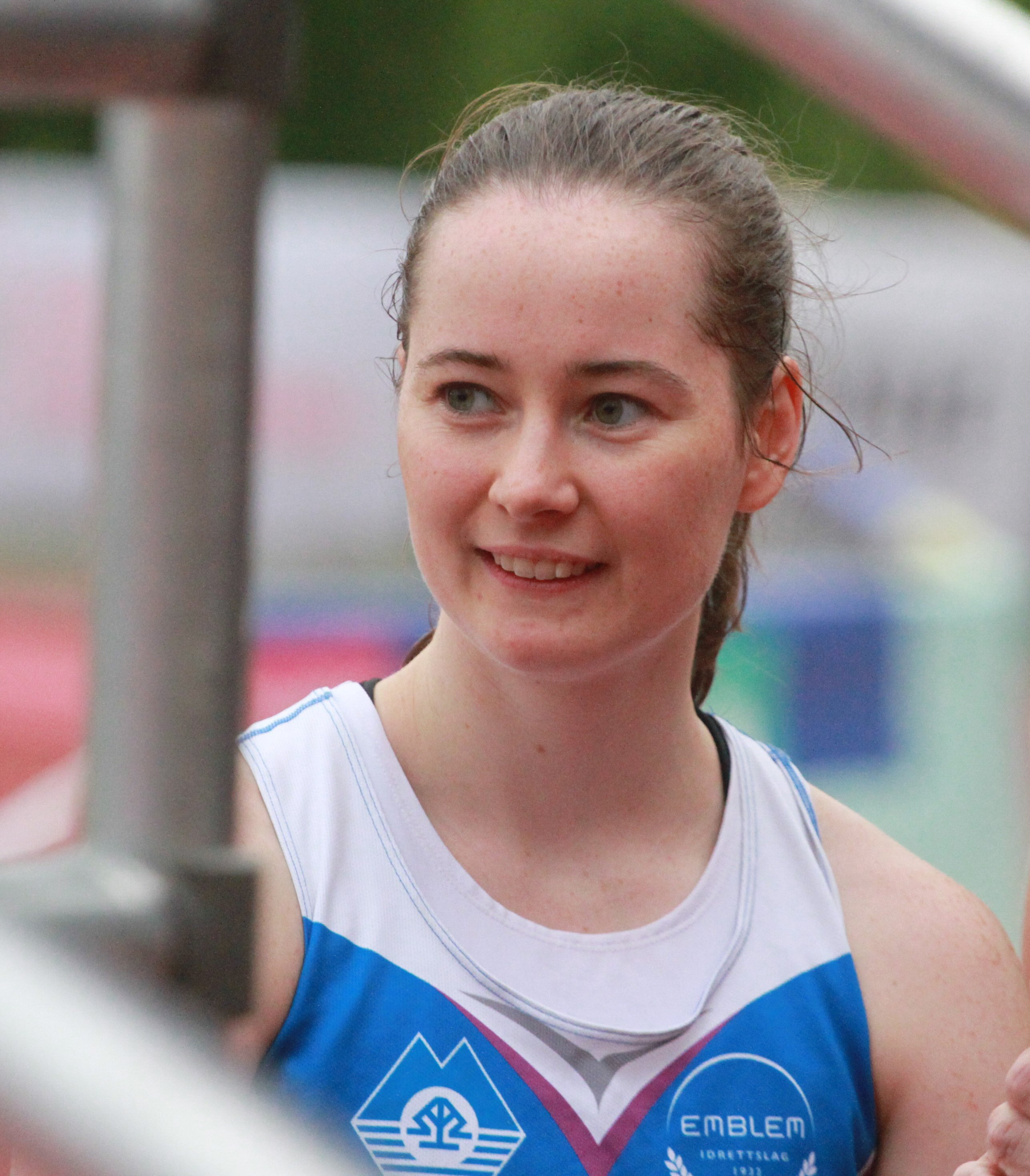

Personal information
- Nationality: Norwegian
- Born: 1997 (age 28–29) Ålesund, Norway

Sport
- Sport: Orienteering
- Club: Emblem IL; IFK Göteborg
Medal record
Representing Norway
Women's orienteering
World Games
Silver medal – second place	2022 Birmingham	Mixed sprint relay
Bronze medal – third place	2022 Birmingham	Middle
Junior World Championships
Bronze medal – third place	2016 Engadin	Relay
Bronze medal – third place	2017 Tampere	Relay

Ingrid Lundanes (born 1997) is a Norwegian orienteering competitor.

== Career ==
Lundanes represents the clubs Emblem IL and IFK Göteborg.

She won a bronze medal in the middle distance at the 2022 World Games, behind Simona Aebersold and Karolin Ohlsson.

== Personal life ==
Lundanes was born in Ålesund in 1997, and is a sister of Olav Lundanes.
