= Parque Lineal (Puerto Vallarta) =

Park in Puerto Vallarta, Jalisco, Mexico

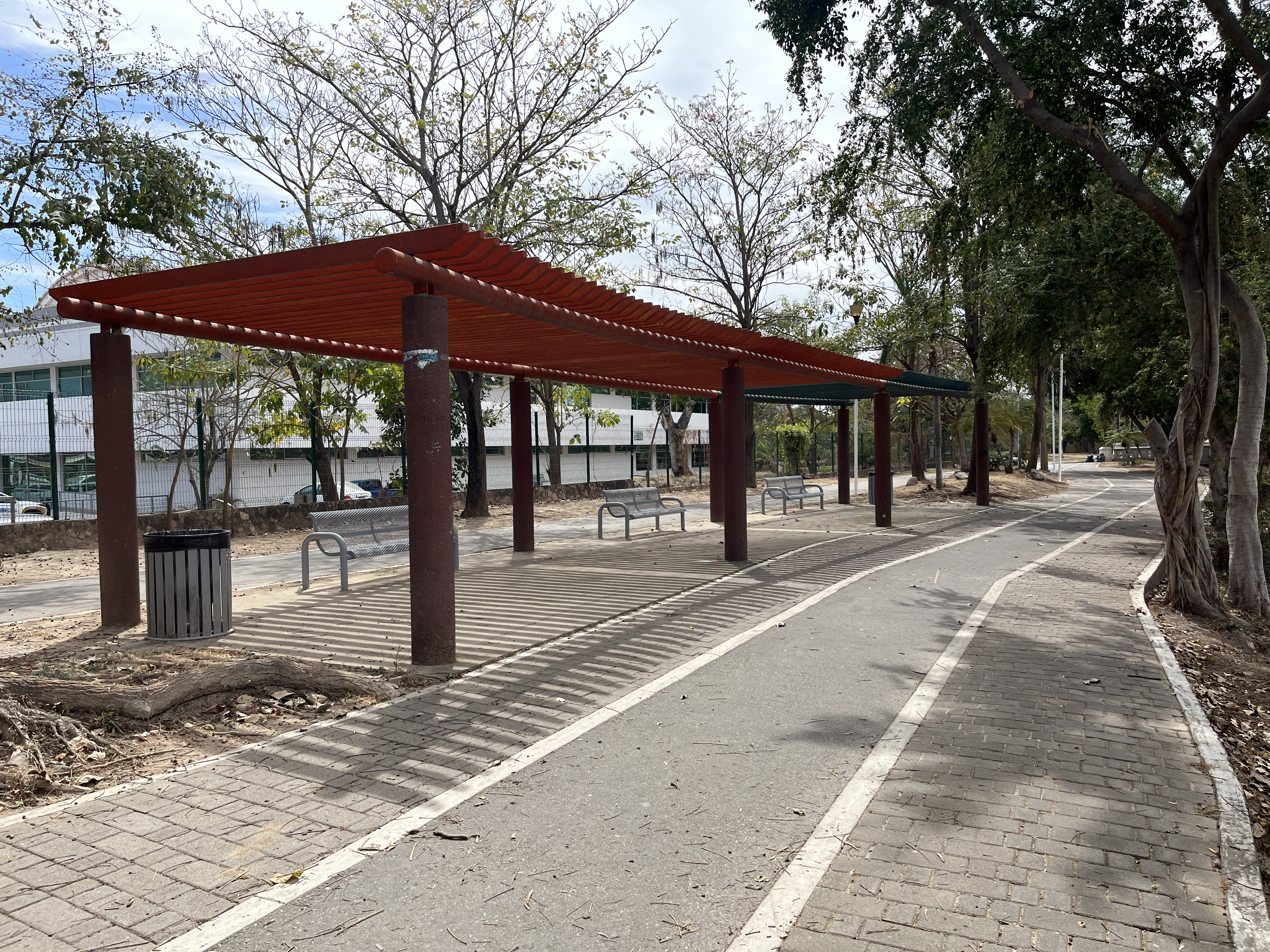
- The park's walkway, 2023
- Interactive map of Parque Lineal
- Location: Puerto Vallarta, Jalisco, Mexico
- Coordinates: 20°38′56.8″N 105°12′52.89″W

Parque Lineal is a linear park in Puerto Vallarta, in the Mexican state of Jalisco. The park features a skatepark.

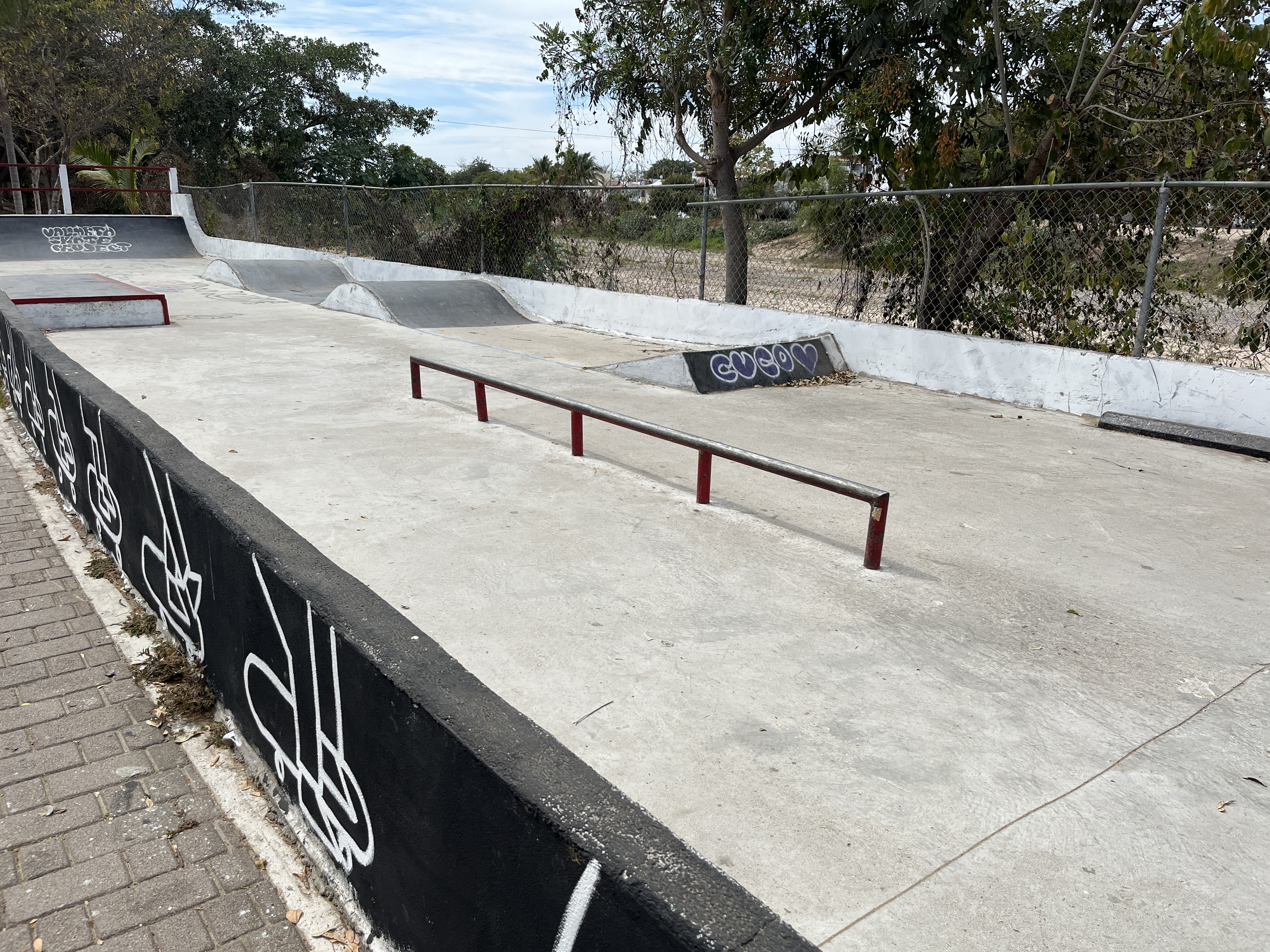
Riomar Skatepark

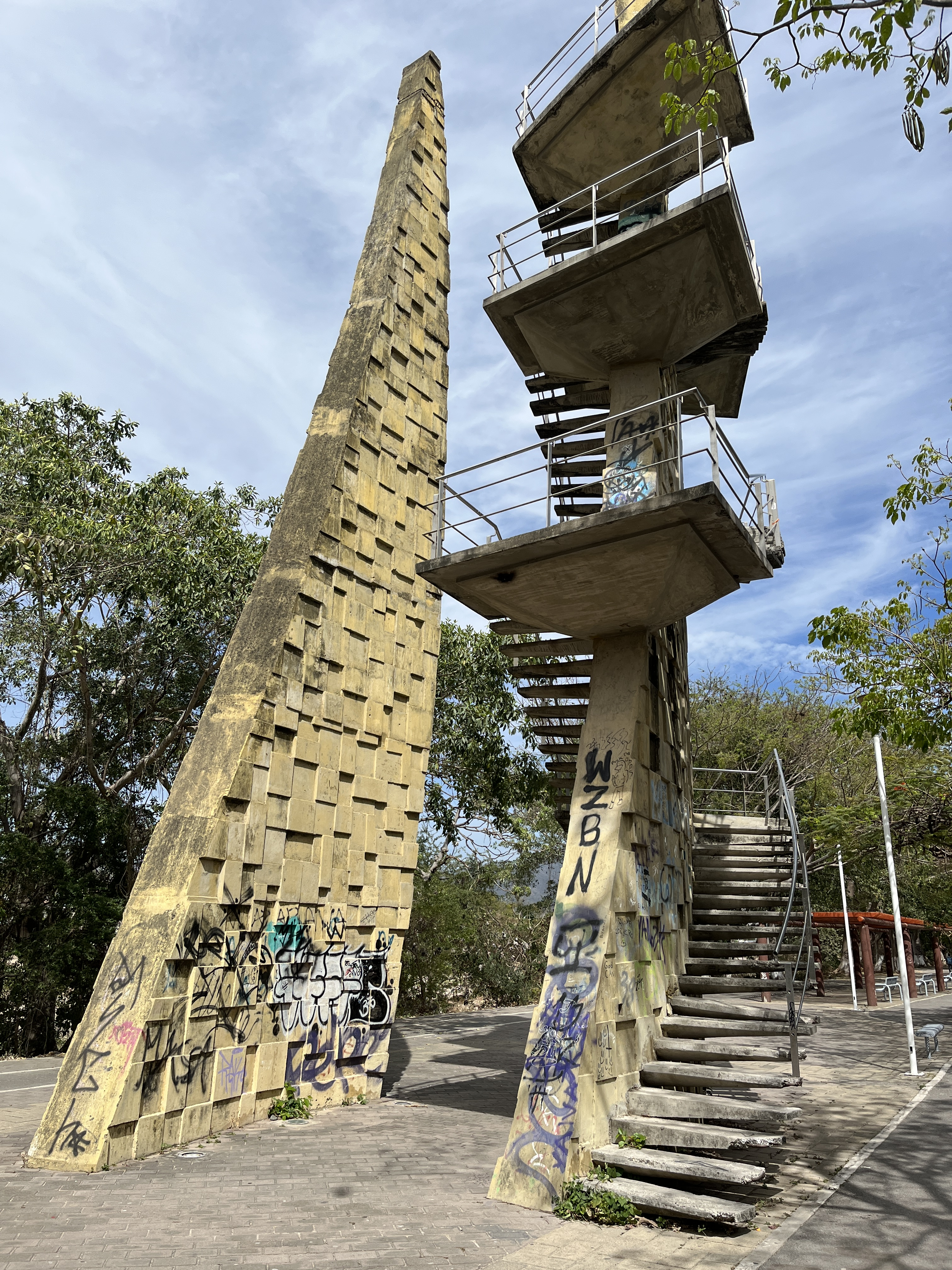
Mirador de la Rivera del Río Pitillal
