= Latvia at the 2022 World Games =

- IOC code: LAT
- NOC: Latvian Olympic Committee

in Birmingham, United States 7 July 2022 – 17 July 2022
- Competitors: 33 (31 men and 2 women) in 6 sports
- Medals: Gold 0 Silver 0 Bronze 0 Total 0

World Games appearances
- 1981; 1985; 1989; 1993; 1997; 2001; 2005; 2009; 2013; 2017; 2022; 2025

Latvia competed at the 2022 World Games held in Birmingham, United States from 7 to 17 July 2022.

== Competitors ==
The following is the list of number of competitors in the Games.

Sport	Men	Women	Total
Air sports	2	1	3
Floorball	14	0	14
Inline hockey	13	0	13
Karate	1	0	1
Orienteering	0	1	1
Water skiing and wakeboarding	1	0	1
Total	31	2	33

== Air sports ==
Three competitors represented Latvia in drone racing.

== Floorball ==
Latvia finished in 4th place in the floorball tournament.

== Inline hockey ==
Latvia finished in 7th place in the inline hockey tournament.

== Karate ==
One competitor represented Latvia in karate.

Athlete	Event	Elimination round				Semifinal	Final / BM	
Athlete	Event	Opposition Result	Opposition Result	Opposition Result	Rank	Opposition Result	Opposition Result	Rank
Kalvis Kalniņš	Men's kumite 60 kg	Shaaban (KUW); L 2–5	Jina (MAR); L 3–5	Brose (BRA); L 0–2	4	Did not advance		7

== Orienteering ==
Latvia competed in orienteering.

Athlete	Event	Time	Rank
Sandra Grosberga	Women's sprint	16:31.00	13
Sandra Grosberga	Women's middle distance	43:22.00	10

== Water skiing & wakeboarding ==
Roberts Linavskis competed in the men's wakeboard event.

Athlete	Event	Results				
Athlete	Event	Quarterfinals	Last Chance Qualifiers	Semifinals	Final	Rank
Roberts Linavskis	Men's Wakeboard Freestyle	5th place	5th place	Did not advance		14

2022 World Games were the first World Games that invited an official from Latvia to participate as a judge - Oskars Kruze.
