= Tereza Rauturier =

Czech orienteering competitor (born 1999)

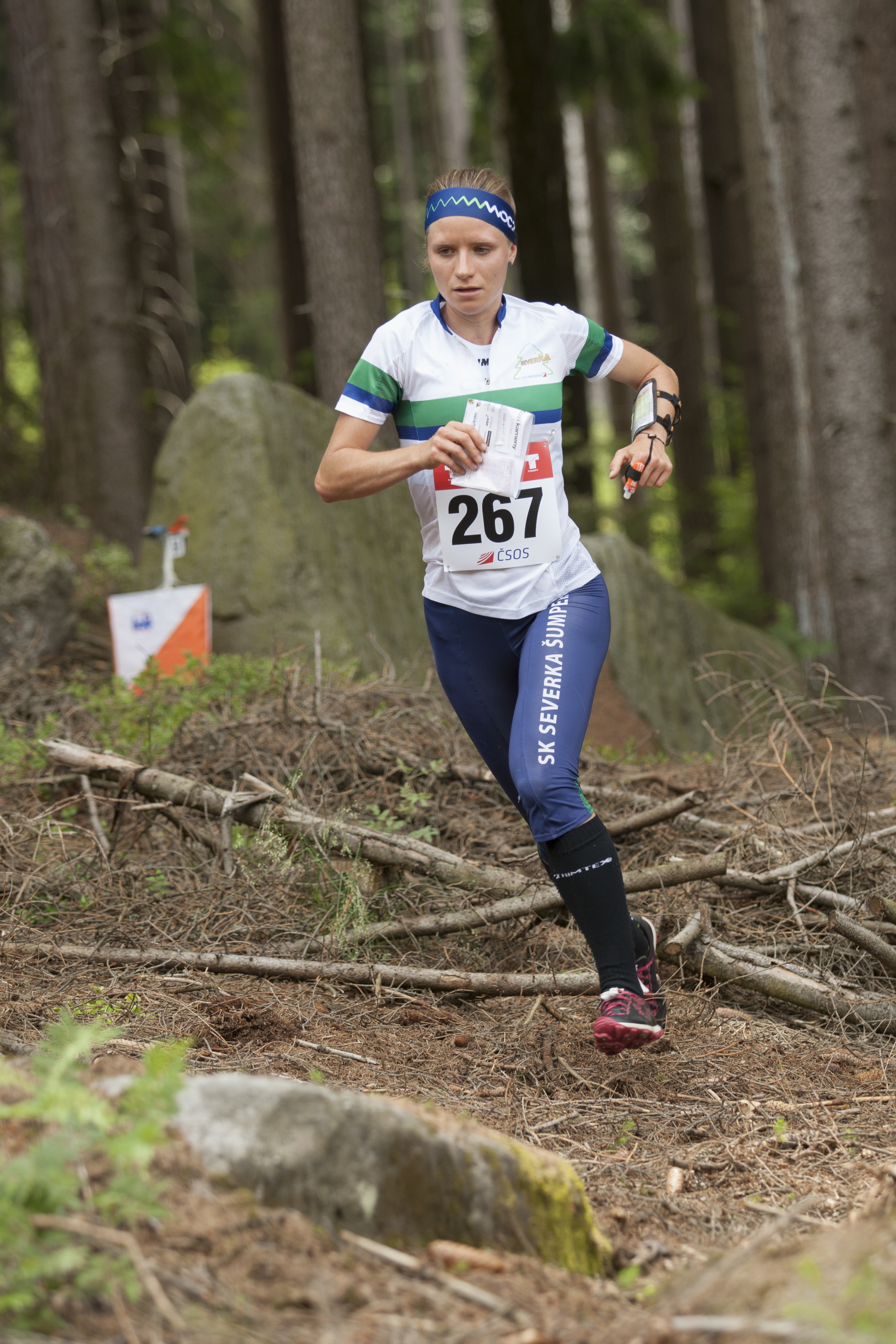

Personal information
- Nationality: Czech
- Born: 8 February 1999 (age 27) Olomouc, Czech Republic

Sport
- Sport: Orienteering
- Club: GO78; SK Severka Šumperk; SOB Olomouc; Suunta Jyväskylä
- Coached by: Jan Petržela
Medal record
Representing Czech Republic
Women's orienteering
World Games
Silver medal – second place	2022 Birmingham	Sprint
Bronze medal – third place	2025 Chengdu	Mixed sprint relay
European Championships
Silver medal – second place	2022 Rakvere	Relay
Junior World Championships
Silver medal – second place	2017 Tampere	Sprint
Silver medal – second place	2018 Kecskemét	Sprint
Silver medal – second place	2018 Kecskemét	Relay
Bronze medal – third place	2018 Kecskemét	Long
Bronze medal – third place	2019 Silkeborg	Middle

Tereza Rauturier (née Janošíková; born 8 February 1999) is a Czech orienteering competitor. She is an individual medalist from the World Games and a team medalist at the European Orienteering Championships.

== Biography ==
Born in 1999, Rauturier represents the clubs GO78, SK Severka Šumperk, SOB Olomouc, and Suunta Jyväskylä. She is coached by Jan Petržela.

Competing at the 2017 Junior World Orienteering Championships in Tampere, she won a silver medal in the sprint and placed 7th in the long distance, 20th in the middle, and 7th in the relay with the Czech team. She placed 24th in the sprint at the 2017 World Orienteering Championships. Representing the Czech Republic at the 2017 World Games, she placed 16th in the sprint and 6th in the sprint relay.

In 2018, she won three medals at the junior world championships, silver medals in the sprint and with the Czech relay team, and a bronze medal in the long distance, placing fourth in the middle distance. She competed at the 2018 World Orienteering Championships, where she placed 5th in the sprint relay, 9th in the relay, and 19th in the sprint. At the 2018 European Orienteering Championships, she placed fourth in the sprint relay with the Chech team and 19th in the sprint.

She won a bronze medal in the middle distance at the 2019 Junior WOC and placed 5th with the Czech relay team, 6th in the sprint, and 6th in the long distance. At the 2019 World Orienteering Championships, she placed 5th in the relay with the Czech team.

In 2021, she placed 4th in the sprint relay at the European championships, 6th in the knockout sprint, and 12th in the sprint. Competing at the 2021 World Orienteering Championships, she placed 5th in the sprint relay with the Czech team, 13th in the long distance, and 14th in the sprint.

She won a silver medal in the sprint at the 2022 World Games. She also placed ninth in the middle distance, and fourth in the sprint relay with the Czech relay team. At the 2022 European Orienteering Championships, she won a silver medal in the relay with the Czech team. She placed 9th in the long distance and 15th in the middle distance at the European championships. Competing at the 2022 World Orienteering Championships, she placed seventh in the sprint, tenth in the knockout sprint, and tenth in the sprint relay with the Czech team. She placed 8th overall in the Orienteering World Cup in 2022.

She placed eighth in the middle distance at the 2023 World Orienteering Championships, and was part of the Czech relay team that finished in fifth place out of 32 starting countries.

In 2024, Rauturier married fellow orienteer Maxime Rauturier.

In July 2026 she placed fourth in the individual sprint at the 2026 World Orienteering Championships in Genova. Two days later she won a gold medal in the knockout sprint, ahead of Karolin Ohlsson and Pia Young Vik.
