= Gyeongchun Line Forest Park =

Park in Seoul, South Korea

Gyeongchun Line Forest Park (Korean: 경춘선 숲길) is a 5.4 km-long linear park located in Nowon District, Seoul, South Korea. It stretches from the area around Kwangwoon University station in Wolgye-dong, through Gongneung-dong and Hwarangdae station, to the vicinity of Damteo Village. It is part of Seoul's urban regeneration project, transforming the abandoned railway section of the old Gyeongchun Line (Seongbuk station to Toegyewon station) into a park.

== History ==
The Gyeongchun Line was originally established in 1939 as a railway connecting Seoul and Chuncheon in Gangwon Province. Spanning a total length of 80.7 km, the railway began at the now-defunct Seongdong station and ended at Chuncheon station. Known as a "romantic train", it was popular among university students for retreats (MTs) and couples for dates.

In December 2010, the Gyeongchun Line was incorporated into the Seoul Metropolitan Subway system, resulting in the cessation of train operations on the original line. The disused railway tracks subsequently became a neglected area in Seoul, suffering from illegal waste dumping and the spread of unauthorized structures.
