= Railroad Park =

Park in Birmingham, Alabama, USA

Coordinates: 33°30′34.17″N 86°48′36.52″W

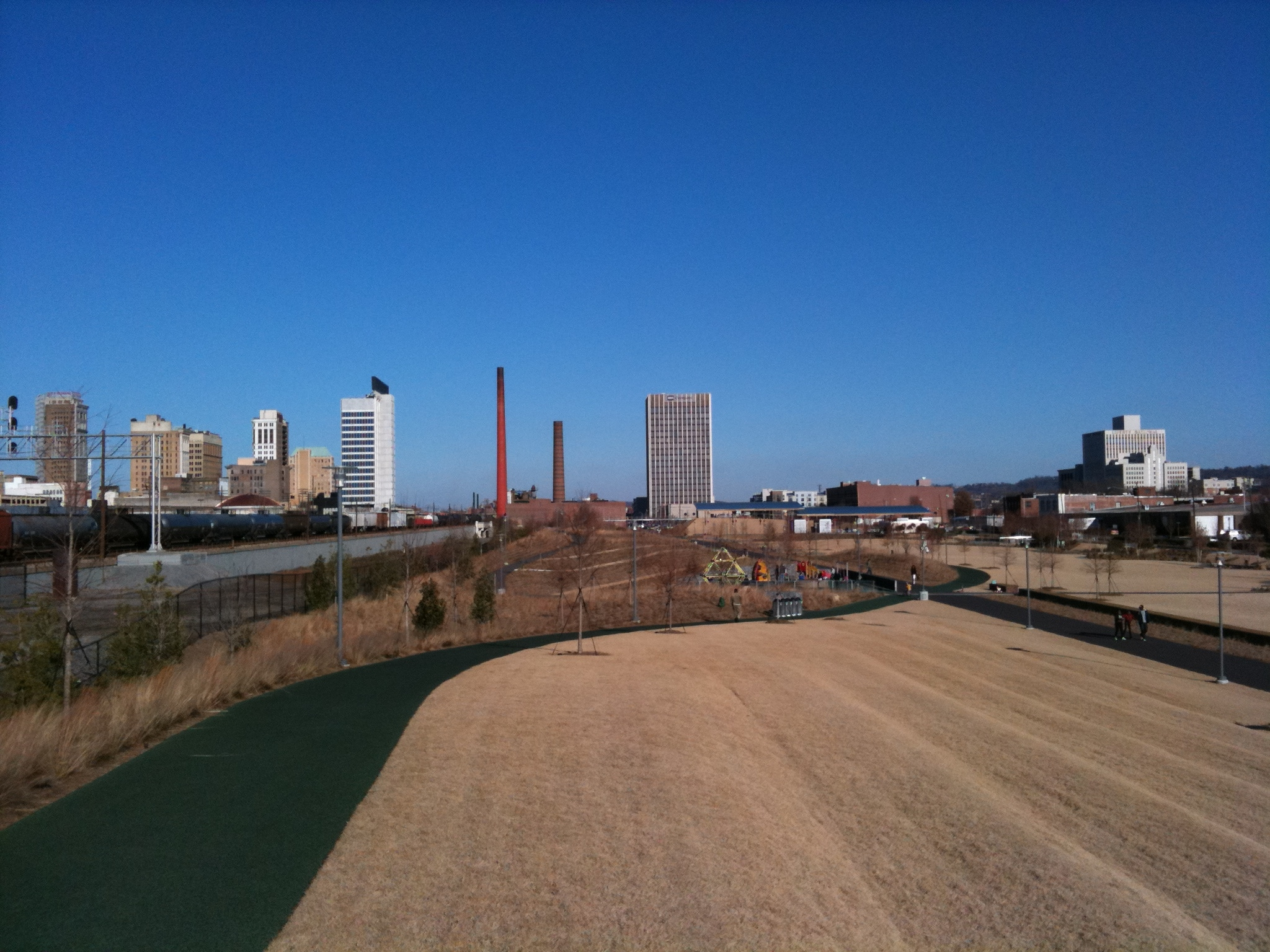
Railroad Park, viewed from the park's northwestern corner.

Railroad Park is a 19-acre park in Birmingham, Alabama, United States, that opened in the fall of 2010. Designed by architect Tom Leader, Railroad Park serves as a green space and a recreation center, hosting music venues, charity walks, movie nights, and other city events. There is an amphitheater that seats 4,000 people. It serves as a green space not only for residents but also for the city’s wildlife. The number of observed bird species in Birmingham went up 250% after the park’s construction. It was created with a special irrigation system to keep the park green while also providing water features such as fountains and streams for the park's visitors.

There is a “Rail Trail” that allows visitors to get close to the tracks and see the trains in action. The topography of the park was structured around the eleven rail-lines that intersect at this site. It is centered around the railroad tracks that helped to industrialize the city and has clear views of Sloss Furnaces, a historic landmark.

The park lies directly south of the Norfolk Southern and CSX rail lines through downtown Birmingham. It stretches from 14th Street to 18th Street along First Avenue South. UAB Hospital and Children's Hospital of Alabama are notable areas near the park. The park is a public facility owned by the City of Birmingham and managed by the non-profit Railroad Park Foundation.

In 2016 Rotary Trail was opened, which connects Railroad Park to Sloss Furnaces through a pedestrian greenway.

== History ==
Railroad Park is rooted in the city of Birmingham’s history, having been partly built from materials sourced from old warehouses around it. The vision for Railroad Park was first introduced with Olmsted brothers in 1924, who’s plans were ultimately scrapped due to lack of space in the rapidly expanding city. The project’s reintroduction in the early 2000’s was backed by FORRD, the Friends of the Railroad District, and gained much traction from there. The site of the park used to be a space for industrial waste for the surrounding warehouses. The park was conceptualized as a bridge to join the north and south parts of Birmingham, and it is now the most racially integrated area in the city.

== Importance ==
Railroad Park represents more than a green space to the city, and due to the area in which it is situated, it is often seen as a bridge between the divided communities of Birmingham. The residents of the city refer to it as "Birmingham's Living Room." The park acknowledges the importance of the steel industry and railways to the development of Birmingham.

== See also ==
- Rotary Trail
