= Marek Loskot =

Czech ice hockey player

- Born: July 25, 1989 (age 36) Černošice, Czechoslovakia
- Height: 5 ft 11 in (180 cm)
- Weight: 165 lb (75 kg; 11 st 11 lb)
- Position: Forward
- Shoots: Right
- Czech Extraliga team: BK Mladá Boleslav
- Playing career: 2010–present

Marek Loskot (born July 25, 1989) was a Czech professional ice hockey player. He played with BK Mladá Boleslav in the Czech Extraliga during the 2010–11 Czech Extraliga season. Now, he is a professional Czech inline hockey player. He has played for several clubs in Europe, including IHC Tygři Černošice in the Czech Republic, Rethel Diables in France, and currently plays for Arona Tenerife Guanches in Spain. He is also a member of the Czech national inline hockey team and won the Inline Hockey World Championship in 2022.
