= Tomáš Rubeš =

Czech ice hockey centre

- Born: September 25, 1992 (age 32); Prague, Czechoslovakia
- Height: 5 ft 8 in (173 cm)
- Weight: 148 lb (67 kg; 10 st 8 lb)
- Position: Centre
- Shoots: Left
- Oberliga team Former teams: Blue Devils Weiden; HC Sparta Praha
- Playing career: 2010–present

Tomáš Rubeš (born September 25, 1992) is a Czech professional ice hockey player. He is currently playing for Blue Devils Weiden of the Oberliga. He previously played with HC Sparta Praha in the Czech Extraliga.
