= Karate at the 2019 Pan American Games – Qualification =

The following is the qualification system and qualified athletes for the karate at the 2019 Pan American Games competitions.

== Qualification system ==
A total of 132 karatekas will qualify to compete. There will be eight athletes qualified in each individual event, along with six teams in the kata team events. Each nation may enter a maximum of 18 athletes (nine per gender). This consists of a maximum of one athlete in the individual events (12), and one group of three in each kata team event (six). The host nation, Peru, automatically qualifies the maximum number of athletes (18). The rest of the spots will be awarded across four qualification tournaments.

Venezuela, Panama and Colombia's athletes will be eligible to qualify through the 2018 Central American and Caribbean Games, while Mexico will qualify through the North American Cup.

Three athletes will make up each team kata entry.

== Qualification timeline ==
Events	Date	Venue
2018 South American Games	May 27–29, 2018	(Bolivia) Cochabamba
2018 Central American and Caribbean Games	July 25–27, 2018	(Colombia) Barranquilla
2018 North American Cup	December 1 2018	(Mexico) Cabo San Lucas
2019 Pan American Championships	March 18–23, 2019	Panama City

== Qualification summary ==
The following is a list of qualified countries and athletes per event.

NOC	Men							Women							Total
NOC	I kata	T kata	60 kg	67 kg	75 kg	84 kg	84+ kg	I kata	T kata	50 kg	55 kg	61 kg	68 kg	68+ kg	Total
Argentina		X	X				X			X				X	7
Aruba				X											1
Bolivia						X									1
Brazil	X	X	X	X	X			X	X	X	X	X	X		15
Canada							X	X			X	X			4
Chile			X	X	X		X				X		X		6
Colombia		X	X		X	X	X		X				X		11
Costa Rica	X								X						4
Cuba				X							X		X		3
Dominican Republic				X	X		X	X	X	X		X	X	X	11
Ecuador	X					X	X	X				X		X	6
Guatemala					X					X					2
Jamaica														X	1
Mexico	X	X	X	X		X		X	X	X	X	X		X	15
Nicaragua		X													3
Panama	X										X				2
Paraguay										X					1
Peru	X	X	X	X	X	X	X	X	X	X	X	X	X	X	18
Uruguay			X			X									2
United States	X				X	X	X	X		X		X	X	X	9
Venezuela	X		X	X	X	X		X			X	X	X	X	10
Total: 21 NOCs	8	18	8	8	8	8	8	8	18	8	8	8	8	8	132

== Men ==
=== Individual kata ===
Competition	Vacancies	Qualified
Host	1	Mariano Alfaro (PER)
2018 South American Games	2	~~Walter Orellano (ARG)~~; Williames Souza Santos (BRA); Andrés Tejada (ECU)
2018 Central American and Caribbean Games	2	Antonio Díaz (VEN); Roy Gatjens (CRC)
2018 North American Cup	1	Waldo Ramirez (MEX)
2019 Pan American Championships	2	Hector Cencion (PAN); Ariel Torres (USA)
TOTAL	8	

- Argentina declined its quota, which was reallocated to Ecuador.

=== Team kata ===
Competition	Vacancies	Qualified
Host	1	Peru
2019 Pan American Championships	5	Colombia; Mexico; Argentina; Brazil; Nicaragua
TOTAL	6	

=== -60 kg ===
Competition	Vacancies	Qualified
Host	1	Amado Quintanilla (PER)
2018 South American Games	2	Daiver Baez (URU); Agustin Farah (ARG)
2018 Central American and Caribbean Games	2	Andrés Rendón (COL); Jovanni Martinez (VEN)
2018 North American Cup	1	Arturo Estrada (MEX)
2019 Pan American Championships	2	Joaquin Gonzalez (CHI); Douglas Brose (BRA)
TOTAL	8	

=== -67 kg ===
Competition	Vacancies	Qualified
Host	1	Andhi Zeballos (PER)
2018 South American Games	2	Vinicius Figueira (BRA); Camilo Velozo (CHI)
2018 Central American and Caribbean Games	2	Deivis Ferreras (DOM); Maikel Noriega (CUB)
2018 North American Cup	1	Jesus Rodriguez (MEX)
2019 Pan American Championships	2	Andres Madera (VEN); Jolano Lindelauf (ARU)
TOTAL	8	

- Jolano Lindelauf qualified under the Curacao flag. Since the nation is not a member of Panamsports, Lindelauf will compete for Aruba.

=== -75 kg ===
Competition	Vacancies	Qualified
Host	1	Jose Vidal (PER)
2018 South American Games	2	Hernani Veríssimo (BRA); Germán Antonio (CHI)
2018 Central American and Caribbean Games	2	Allan Maldonado (GUA); Jhosed Ortuno (VEN)
2018 North American Cup	1	Tom Scott (USA)
2019 Pan American Championships	2	Juan Landázuri (COL); Anderson Soriano (DOM)
TOTAL	8	

=== -84 kg ===
Competition	Vacancies	Qualified
Host	1	Carlos Ganoza (PER)
2018 South American Games	2	Esteban Leon (ECU); Mohamed Chavez (BOL)
2018 Central American and Caribbean Games	2	Carlos Sinisterra (COL); Freddy Valera (VEN)
2018 North American Cup	1	Kamran Madani (USA)
2019 Pan American Championships	2	Alan Cuevas (MEX); Juan Macedo (URU)
TOTAL	8	

=== +84 kg ===
Competition	Vacancies	Qualified
Host	1	Jorge Rojas (PER)
2018 South American Games	2	Rodrigo Macchiavello (CHI); German Perez (ARG)
2018 Central American and Caribbean Games	2	Anel Castillo (DOM); Diego Lenis (COL)
2018 North American Cup	1	Brian Irr (USA)
2019 Pan American Championships	2	Franklin Mina (ECU); Daniel Gaysinsky (CAN)
TOTAL	8	

== Women ==
=== Individual kata ===
Competition	Vacancies	Qualified
Host	1	Ingrid Aranda (PER)
2018 South American Games	2	Nicole Mota (BRA); Cristina Arcos (ECU)
2018 Central American and Caribbean Games	2	Maria Dimitrova (DOM); Andrea Armada (VEN)
2018 North American Cup	1	Sakura Kokumai (USA)
2019 Pan American Championships	2	Cinthia de La Rue (MEX); Rita Ngo (CAN)
TOTAL	8	

=== Team kata ===
Competition	Vacancies	Qualified
Host	1	Peru
2019 Pan American Championships	5	Dominican Republic; Mexico; Colombia; Brazil; Costa Rica
TOTAL	6	

=== -50 kg ===
Competition	Vacancies	Qualified
Host	1	Selene Rodriguez (PER)
2018 South American Games	2	Yamila Benítez (ARG); Leyla Servin (PAR)
2018 Central American and Caribbean Games	2	Ana Villanueva (DOM); Cheili González (GUA)
2018 North American Cup	1	Shannon Nishi-Patton (USA)
2019 Pan American Championships	2	Jéssica de Paula (BRA); Alicia Hernández (MEX)
TOTAL	8	

=== -55 kg ===
Competition	Vacancies	Qualified
Host	1	Maria Vindrola (PER)
2018 South American Games	2	Valéria Kumizaki (BRA); Tihare Aros (CHI)
2018 Central American and Caribbean Games	2	Genesis Navarrete (VEN); Baurelys Torres (CUB)
2018 North American Cup	1	Paula Flores (MEX)
2019 Pan American Championships	2	Raquel Bozelli (PAN); Kathryn Campbell (CAN)
TOTAL	8	

=== -61 kg ===
Competition	Vacancies	Qualified
Host	1	Alexandra Grande (PER)
2018 South American Games	2	Jacqueline Factos (ECU); Érica Dos Santos (BRA)
2018 Central American and Caribbean Games	2	Claudymar Garcés (VEN); Karina Diaz (DOM)
2018 North American Cup	1	Haya Jumaa (CAN)
2019 Pan American Championships	2	Xhunashi Caballero (MEX); Ashley Hill (USA)
TOTAL	8	

=== -68 kg ===
Competition	Vacancies	Qualified
Host	1	Gabriela Ochoa (PER)
2018 South American Games	2	Susana Li (CHI); Gabrielle Sepé (BRA)
2018 Central American and Caribbean Games	2	Cirelys Martinez (CUB); Marianth Cuervo (VEN)
2018 North American Cup	1	Cheryl Murphy (USA)
2019 Pan American Championships	2	Tanya Rodríguez (DOM); Wendy Mosquera (COL)
TOTAL	8	

=== +68 kg ===
Competition	Vacancies	Qualified
Host	1	Isabel Aco (PER)
2018 South American Games	2	Valeria Marmolejo (ECU); Valentina Castro (ARG)
2018 Central American and Caribbean Games	2	Omaira Molina (VEN); Pamela Rodriguez (DOM)
2018 North American Cup	1	Guadalupe Quintal (MEX)
2019 Pan American Championships	2	Jessica Cargill (JAM); Cirrus Lingl (USA)
TOTAL	8	
