= Marianth Cuervo =

Venezuelan karateka (born 1997)

Personal information
- Full name: Marianth Cuervo Baute
- Born: 21 February 1997 (age 29)
- Height: 173 cm (5 ft 8 in)

Sport
- Country: Venezuela
- Sport: Karate
- Weight class: 68 kg
- Events: Kumite; Team kumite
Medal record
Women's karate
Representing Venezuela
Pan American Games
Bronze medal – third place	2019 Lima	Kumite 68 kg
South American Games
Gold medal – first place	2018 Cochabamba	Kumite 68 kg
Bronze medal – third place	2022 Asunción	Kumite 68 kg
Central American and Caribbean Games
Silver medal – second place	2018 Barranquilla	Kumite 68 kg
Bronze medal – third place	2023 San Salvador	Kumite 68 kg
Bolivarian Games
Gold medal – first place	2025 Lima-Ayacucho	Team kumite
Silver medal – second place	2022 Valledupar	Team kumite
Silver medal – second place	2025 Lima-Ayacucho	Kumite 68 kg
Bronze medal – third place	2022 Valledupar	Kumite 68 kg
World junior, cadet and U21 Karate Championships
Silver medal – second place	2017 Tenerife	Kumite 68 kg U21

Marianth Maribel Cuervo Baute (born 21 February 1997) is a Venezuelan karateka. She won one of the bronze medals in the women's kumite 68 kg event at the 2019 Pan American Games held in Lima, Peru.

== Career ==
In 2017, Cuervo was in charge of carrying the Venezuelan flag in the parade of the 18th Bolivarian Games. By this time, she had achieved national and international titles, such as the World Runner-up, National Champion, Simón Bolívar International Cup Champion, Central American and Caribbean Champion, South American Champion and Pan American Champion.

In 2018, Cuervo won the silver medal in the women's kumite 68 kg event at the Central American and Caribbean Games held in Barranquilla, Colombia. She won gold in the women's kumite 68 kg event at the XI South American Games in Cochabamba, Bolivia, beating Chilean Susana Li Zhang 6-1. That year she was also part of the gold medal-winning women's team kumite side at the Pan American Karate Federation Senior Championships.

Cuervo then came 11th place for the women's 68.0 kg in Moscow in 2019, and also competed at the Lima 2019 Pan American Games.

In 2020, Cuervo competed at the World Olympic Qualification Tournament held in Paris, France, hoping to qualify for the 2020 Summer Olympics in Tokyo, Japan. In November 2021, she competed in the women's 68 kg event at the World Karate Championships held in Dubai, United Arab Emirates.

Cuervo won one of the bronze medals in the women's 68 kg event at the 2022 Bolivarian Games held in Valledupar, Colombia. She also won one of the bronze medals in her event at the 2022 South American Games held in Asunción, Paraguay. In her matches at the South American games she drew 0-0 with Wendy Mosquera from Colombia, defeated Selena Luján from Argentina 3-1, beat Sol Cabrera from Peru 8-0, then lost to Brazilian Laura Prezzoti 8-0. Also in 2022, she won the silver medal at the XXXV Pan American Karate Federation Senior Championships.

In 2023, she competed in the women's 68 kg event at the World Karate Championships held in Budapest, Hungary. She was eliminated in the repechage by María Nieto of Spain.

== Achievements ==
Year	Competition	Venue	Rank	Event
2018	South American Games	Cochabamba, Bolivia	1st	Kumite 68 kg
2019	Pan American Games	Lima, Peru	3rd	Kumite 68 kg
2022	Bolivarian Games	Valledupar, Colombia	3rd	Kumite 68 kg
2022	Bolivarian Games	Valledupar, Colombia	2nd	Team kumite
2022	South American Games	Asunción, Paraguay	3rd	Kumite 68 kg
2023	Central American and Caribbean Games	San Salvador, El Salvador	3rd	Kumite 68 kg
