= Karate at the 2018 South American Games =

Karate competition

- Venue: Coliseo Suramericano
- Location: (Bolivia) Cochabamba
- Dates: 27–29 May
- Competitors: 100 from 12 nations

There were twelve karate events at the 2018 South American Games in Cochabamba, Bolivia. Six for men and six for women. The events were held between May 27 and 29 at the Coliseo Suramericano. The top 2 athletes in each event (minus the host nation Peru, Colombia and Venezuela, whose athletes will qualify through the 2018 Central American and Caribbean Games) qualifying them to compete at the 2019 Pan American Games in Lima, Peru.

== Medal summary ==
=== Medal table ===
* Host nation (Bolivia)

Rank	Nation	Gold	Silver	Bronze	Total
1	Venezuela (VEN)	4	3	2	9
2	Peru (PER)	2	2	4	8
3	Brazil (BRA)	1	2	4	7
4	Chile (CHI)	1	1	3	5
4	Colombia (COL)	1	1	3	5
4	Ecuador (ECU)	1	1	3	5
7	Argentina (ARG)	1	0	4	5
8	Uruguay (URU)	1	0	0	1
9	Panama (PAN)	0	1	0	1
9	Paraguay (PAR)	0	1	0	1
11	Bolivia (BOL)*	0	0	1	1
Totals (11 entries)		**12**	**12**	**24**	**48**

=== Men's events ===
Event	Gold	Silver	Bronze
60 kg	**Daiver Baez**; **Uruguay**	Jovanni Martínez; Venezuela	Andrés Rendón; Colombia
60 kg	**Daiver Baez**; **Uruguay**	Jovanni Martínez; Venezuela	**Agustin Farah**; **Argentina**
67 kg	Andrés Madera; Venezuela	**Vinicius Figueira**; **Brazil**	**Camilo Velozo Zuñiga**; **Chile**
67 kg	Andrés Madera; Venezuela	**Vinicius Figueira**; **Brazil**	José Ramírez; Colombia
75 kg	Juan Landázuri; Colombia	**Hernani Verissimo**; **Brazil**	José Valdivia; Peru
75 kg	Juan Landázuri; Colombia	**Hernani Verissimo**; **Brazil**	Jhosed Ortuño; Venezuela
84 kg	Freddy Valera; Venezuela	Israel Aco; Peru	**Esteban Leon**; **Ecuador**
84 kg	Freddy Valera; Venezuela	Israel Aco; Peru	**Mohamed Chavez**; **Bolivia**
+84 kg	**Rodrigo Macchiavello**; **Chile**	Diego Lenis; Colombia	Franklin Mina; Ecuador
+84 kg	**Rodrigo Macchiavello**; **Chile**	Diego Lenis; Colombia	**Germán Pérez**; **Argentina**
Individual Kata	Antonio Díaz; Venezuela	**Héctor Cención**; **Panama**	Mariano Wong; Peru
Individual Kata	Antonio Díaz; Venezuela	**Héctor Cención**; **Panama**	**Walter Carrizo**; **Argentina**

- In the 75kg category, Chilean German Antonio qualified as the second eligible athlete for Lima 2019.

=== Women's events ===
Event	Gold	Silver	Bronze
50 kg	**Yamila Benitez**; **Argentina**	**Leyla Amarilla**; **Paraguay**	Giovanna Feroldi; Brazil
50 kg	**Yamila Benitez**; **Argentina**	**Leyla Amarilla**; **Paraguay**	Aurimer Campos; Venezuela
55 kg	**Valéria Kumizaki**; **Brazil**	Bárbara Pérez; Venezuela	**Tihare Aros**; **Chile**
55 kg	**Valéria Kumizaki**; **Brazil**	Bárbara Pérez; Venezuela	Hiromi Sánchez; Peru
61 kg	**Jacqueline Factos**; **Ecuador**	Alexandra Grande; Peru	**Érica dos Santos**; **Brazil**
61 kg	**Jacqueline Factos**; **Ecuador**	Alexandra Grande; Peru	Carolina Videla; Chile
68 kg	Marianth Cuervo; Venezuela	**Susana Li**; **Chile**	**Gabrielle Sepe**; **Brazil**
68 kg	Marianth Cuervo; Venezuela	**Susana Li**; **Chile**	Milagros Alfaro; Peru
+68 kg	Isabel Aco; Peru	**Valeria Marmolejo**; **Ecuador**	Shanee Torres; Colombia
+68 kg	Isabel Aco; Peru	**Valeria Marmolejo**; **Ecuador**	**Valentina Castro**; **Argentina**
Individual Kata	Ingrid Aranda; Peru	Valerya Hernández; Venezuela	**Nicole Mota**; **Brazil**
Individual Kata	Ingrid Aranda; Peru	Valerya Hernández; Venezuela	**Cristina Arcos**; **Ecuador**

Athletes in bold have qualified to compete at the 2019 Pan American Games in Lima, Peru. Both Venezuela and Colombia elected to use the 2018 Central American and Caribbean Games as their qualifying event and thus are ineligible to qualify athletes here.

== See also ==
- Karate at the 2019 Pan American Games – Qualification
