= Karate at the 2022 South American Games =

- Venue: Pavilion 3 of SND
- Dates: October 3−5
- Nations: 13

Karate competitions at the 2022 South American Games in Asunción, Paraguay were held between October 3 and 5, 2022 at the Pavilion 3 of SND

== Schedule ==
The competition schedule is as follows:

Men
Date Event	Mon 3	Tue 4	Wed 5
Men's individual kata	F		
Men's 60 kg			F
Men's 67 kg			F
Men's 75 kg		F	
Men's 84 kg		F	
Men's +84 kg	F		

F	Final

Women
Date Event	Mon 3	Tue 4	Wed 5
Women's individual kata	F		
Women's 50 kg			F
Women's 55 kg			F
Women's 61 kg		F	
Women's 68 kg		F	
Women's +68 kg	F		

== Medal summary ==
=== Medal table ===
* Host nation (Paraguay)

Rank	Nation	Gold	Silver	Bronze	Total
1	Venezuela (VEN)	3	2	4	9
2	Brazil (BRA)	3	2	2	7
3	Chile (CHI)	3	1	2	6
4	Ecuador (ECU)	2	0	2	4
5	Peru (PER)	1	1	2	4
6	Colombia (COL)	0	2	3	5
7	Paraguay (PAR)*	0	2	2	4
8	Argentina (ARG)	0	1	5	6
9	Uruguay (URU)	0	1	1	2
10	Panama (PAN)	0	0	1	1
Totals (10 entries)		12	12	24	48

=== Medalists ===
==== Men ====
Event	Gold	Silver	Bronze
Men's individual kata	Cleiver Casanova; Venezuela	Mariano Wong; Peru	Héctor Cención; Panama
Men's individual kata	Cleiver Casanova; Venezuela	Mariano Wong; Peru	Luca Impagnatiello; Argentina
Men's 60 kg	Douglas Brose; Brazil	Daiver Larrosa; Uruguay	Cesar Riera; Venezuela
Men's 60 kg	Douglas Brose; Brazil	Daiver Larrosa; Uruguay	Juan Fernández; Colombia
Men's 67 kg	Andrés Madera; Venezuela	Camilo Velozo; Chile	Fred Proaño; Ecuador
Men's 67 kg	Andrés Madera; Venezuela	Camilo Velozo; Chile	Gonzalo Navarro; Argentina
Men's 75 kg	Matías Rodríguez; Chile	Alisson Sobrinho; Brazil	Francisco Barrios; Uruguay
Men's 75 kg	Matías Rodríguez; Chile	Alisson Sobrinho; Brazil	Juan Landázuri; Colombia
Men's 84 kg	José Acevedo; Ecuador	Jesús Servín; Paraguay	Freddy Valera; Venezuela
Men's 84 kg	José Acevedo; Ecuador	Jesús Servín; Paraguay	Rubén Henao; Colombia
Men's +84 kg	Rodrigo Rojas; Chile	Lucas Miranda; Brazil	Fernando Ramírez; Paraguay
Men's +84 kg	Rodrigo Rojas; Chile	Lucas Miranda; Brazil	Marcos Molina; Argentina

==== Women ====
Event	Gold	Silver	Bronze
Women's individual kata	Nicole Mota; Brazil	Andrea Armada; Venezuela	Cristina Orbe; Ecuador
Women's individual kata	Nicole Mota; Brazil	Andrea Armada; Venezuela	Ingrid Aranda; Peru
Women's 50 kg	Yorgelis Salazar; Venezuela	Yamila Benítez; Argentina	Leyla Servín; Paraguay
Women's 50 kg	Yorgelis Salazar; Venezuela	Yamila Benítez; Argentina	Claudia de la Cruz; Peru
Women's 55 kg	Valentina Toro; Chile	Yennifer Servin; Paraguay	Valéria Kumizaki; Brazil
Women's 55 kg	Valentina Toro; Chile	Yennifer Servin; Paraguay	Mickaela Novak; Argentina
Women's 61 kg	Alexandra Grande; Peru	Claudymar Garcés; Venezuela	Bárbara Huaiquimán; Chile
Women's 61 kg	Alexandra Grande; Peru	Claudymar Garcés; Venezuela	Laura Díaz; Argentina
Women's 68 kg	Anna Laura Prezzoti; Brazil	Wendy Mosquera; Colombia	Marianth Cuervo; Venezuela
Women's 68 kg	Anna Laura Prezzoti; Brazil	Wendy Mosquera; Colombia	Ignacia Morales; Chile
Women's +68 kg	Valeria Echever; Ecuador	Shanee Torres; Colombia	Brenda Padilha; Brazil
Women's +68 kg	Valeria Echever; Ecuador	Shanee Torres; Colombia	Oriana Rodríguez; Venezuela

== Participation ==
Thirteen nations participated in karate events of the 2022 South American Games.

- Argentina
- Bolivia
- Brazil
- Chile
- Colombia
- Curaçao
- Ecuador
- Panama
- Paraguay
- Peru
- Suriname
- Uruguay
- Venezuela

== Results ==
=== Men's Individual Kata ===
Rank	Athlete	Nation	Qualifiers				Round 3		Result
Rank	Athlete	Nation	Round 1	Round 2	Total	Rank	Round 3	Rank	Result
1	Mariano Wong	Peru	23.86	23.92	48	2 Q	24.54	1	Gold medal match
2	Cleiver Casanova	Venezuela	23.88	24.04	48	1 Q	24.42	2	Gold medal match
3	Héctor Cención	Panama	23.52	23.66	47	3 Q	23.54	3	Bronze medal matches
4	Bruno Conde	Brazil	22.52	23	46	5 Q	22.86	4	Bronze medal matches
5	Hernán Amaya	Colombia	23.14	23.14	46	6 Q	23.28	5	Bronze medal matches
6	Luca Impagnatiello	Argentina	23.52	23.26	47	4 Q	23.06	6	Bronze medal matches
7	Ignacio Santos	Uruguay	22.08	22.02	44	7	Did not advance		
8	Leandro Subirana	Bolivia	21.06	22	42	8	Did not advance		
9	Francisco Rojas	Paraguay	20.94	21.02	42	9	Did not advance		
10	Miquel Guljhari	Suriname	0	18.54	19	10	Did not advance		

Gold medal match
(Venezuela) Cleiver Casanova	24.02
(Peru) Mariano Wong	23.08

Bronze medal match
(Panama) Héctor Cención	23.94
(Colombia) Hernán Amaya	23.54

Bronze medal match
(Argentina) Luca Impanatiello	23.74
(Brazil) Bruno Conde	22.08

=== Men's 60 kg ===
Pool A

Rk	Athlete	Pld	W	L	Pts.
1	(Uruguay) Daiver Larrosa	4	4	0	12
2	(Colombia) Juan Fernández	4	3	1	9
3	(Chile) Iván Carrasco	4	2	2	6
4	(Bolivia) Andree Quezada	4	1	3	3
5	(Paraguay) José Ramón Torres	4	0	4	0

	Score	
(Colombia) Juan Fernández	3–1	(Chile) Iván Carrasco
(Paraguay) José Ramón Torres	1–6	(Bolivia) Andree Quezada
(Chile) Iván Carrasco	4–0	(Bolivia) Andree Quezada
(Paraguay) José Ramón Torres	1–9	(Uruguay) Daiver Larrosa
(Bolivia) Andree Quezada	1–9	(Colombia) Juan Fernández
(Uruguay) Daiver Larrosa	1–0	(Chile) Iván Carrasco
(Colombia) Juan Fernández	8–0	(Paraguay) José Ramón Torres
(Colombia) Juan Fernández	3–7	(Uruguay) Daiver Larrosa
(Uruguay) Daiver Larrosa	3–2	(Bolivia) Andree Quezada
(Chile) Iván Carrasco	5–0	(Paraguay) José Ramón Torres

Pool B

Rk	Athlete	Pld	W	L	Pts.
1	(Brazil) Douglas Brose	4	4	0	12
2	(Venezuela) César Riera	4	3	1	9
3	(Peru) Amado Escalante	4	2	2	6
4	(Ecuador) Jesús Veintimilla	4	1	3	3
5	(Panama) Roberto Payares	4	0	4	0

	Score	
(Ecuador) Jesús Veintimilla	2(SEN)–2	(Panama) Roberto Payares
(Brazil) Douglas Brose	3–1	(Peru) Amado Escalante
(Ecuador) Jesús Veintimilla	0–8	(Venezuela) César Riera
(Panama) Roberto Payares	2–2(SEN)	(Peru) Amado Escalante
(Peru) Amado Escalante	8–3	(Ecuador) Jesús Veintimilla
(Venezuela) César Riera	0–3	(Brazil) Douglas Brose
(Brazil) Douglas Brose	4–0	(Ecuador) Jesús Veintimilla
(Panama) Roberto Payares	1–3	(Venezuela) César Riera
(Panama) Roberto Payares	0–4	(Brazil) Douglas Brose
(Venezuela) César Riera	6–2	(Peru) Amado Escalante

Finals

Semifinals
(Uruguay) Daiver Larrosa	5
(Venezuela) César Riera	4
(Colombia) Juan Fernández	5
(Brazil) Douglas Brose	7

Gold medal match
(Uruguay) Daiver Larrosa	0
(Brazil) Douglas Brose	1

=== Men's 67 kg ===
Pool A

Rk	Athlete	Pld	W	D	L	Pts.
1	(Chile) Camilo Velozo	4	3	1	0	10
2	(Venezuela) Andrés Madera	4	3	1	0	10
3	(Peru) Klaus Hurtado	4	2	0	2	6
4	(Bolivia) Sebastián Soliz	4	1	0	3	3
5	(Suriname) Radjvir Somai	4	0	0	4	0

	Score	
(Bolivia) Sebastián Soliz	4–1	(Suriname) Radjvir Somai
(Venezuela) Andrés Madera	1–1	(Chile) Camio Velozo
(Bolivia) Sebastián Soliz	1–6	(Peru) Klaus Hurtado
(Bolivia) Sebastián Soliz	0–8	(Chile) Camio Velozo
(Venezuela) Andrés Madera	3–0	(Peru) Klaus Hurtado
(Suriname) Radjvir Somai	0–10	(Chile) Camio Velozo
(Venezuela) Andrés Madera	6–5	(Bolivia) Sebastián Soliz
(Peru) Klaus Hurtado	6–0	(Suriname) Radjvir Somai
(Suriname) Radjvir Somai	0–10	(Venezuela) Andrés Madera
(Chile) Camio Velozo	8–2	(Peru) Klaus Hurtado

Pool B

Rk	Athlete	Pld	W	L	Pts.
1	(Argentina) Gonzalo Navarro	4	4	0	12
2	(Ecuador) Fred Proaño	4	3	1	9
3	(Brazil) Vinícius Figueira	4	2	2	6
4	(Panama) Alberto Galvez	4	1	3	3
5	(Paraguay) Matías Cabrera	4	0	4	0

	Score	
(Ecuador) Fred Proaño	1(SEN)–0	(Panama) Alberto Galvez
(Paraguay) Matías Cabrera	3–11	(Brazil) Vinícius Figueira
(Ecuador) Fred Proaño	1–3	(Argentina) Gonzalo Navarro
(Panama) Alberto Galvez	3–1	(Paraguay) Matías Cabrera
(Paraguay) Matías Cabrera	1–2	(Ecuador) Fred Proaño
(Brazil) Vinícius Figueira	3–7	(Argentina) Gonzalo Navarro
(Brazil) Vinícius Figueira	0–2	(Ecuador) Fred Proaño
(Argentina) Gonzalo Navarro	1–0	(Panama) Alberto Galvez
(Panama) Alberto Galvez	0–2	(Brazil) Vinícius Figueira
(Argentina) Gonzalo Navarro	2–0	(Paraguay) Matías Cabrera

Finals

Semifinals
(Chile) Camilo Velozo	5
(Ecuador) Fred Proaño	4
(Argentina) Gonzalo Navarro	2
(Venezuela) Andrés Madera	3

Gold medal match
(Chile) Camilo Velozo	3
(Venezuela) Andrés Madera	7

=== Men's 75 kg ===
Pool A

Rk	Athlete	Pld	W	L	Pts.
1	(Brazil) Allison Sobronho	5	4	1	12
2	(Uruguay) Francisco Barrios	5	4	1	12
3	(Venezuela) Jhosed Ortuño	5	4	1	12
4	(Ecuador) Luis Choez	5	2	3	6
5	(Bolivia) Álex Meneses	5	1	4	3
6	(Peru) Juan José Ríos	5	0	5	0

	Score	
(Bolivia) Álex Meneses	2–4	(Brazil) Alisson Sobrinho
(Venezuela) Jhosed Ortuño	1–5	(Uruguay) Francisco Barrios
(Peru) Juan José Ríos	2–7	(Brazil) Alisson Sobrinho
(Uruguay) Francisco Barrios	3–1	(Ecuador) Luis Choez
(Peru) Juan José Ríos	3–7	(Ecuador) Luis Choez
(Brazil) Alisson Sobrinho	3(SEN)–3	(Ecuador) Luis Choez
(Brazil) Alisson Sobrinho	2–0	(Uruguay) Francisco Barrios
(Bolivia) Álex Meneses	2–1	(Peru) Juan José Ríos
(Bolivia) Álex Meneses	1–2	(Venezuela) Jhosed Ortuño
(Ecuador) Luis Choez	5–5(SEN)	(Venezuela) Jhosed Ortuño
(Venezuela) Jhosed Ortuño	4(SEN)–4	(Peru) Juan José Ríos
(Uruguay) Francisco Barrios	5(SEN)–5	(Bolivia) Álex Meneses
(Venezuela) Jhosed Ortuño	2–1	(Brazil) Alisson Sobrinho
(Uruguay) Francisco Barrios	3–0	(Peru) Juan José Ríos
(Ecuador) Luis Choez	4–2	(Bolivia) Álex Meneses

Pool B

Rk	Athlete	Pld	W	L	Pts.
1	(Chile) Matías Rodríguez	4	4	0	12
2	(Colombia) Juan Landázuri	4	3	1	9
3	(Argentina) Julio Ichiki	4	2	2	6
4	(Panama) Armando Mendoza	4	1	3	3
5	(Paraguay) Adol Servin	4	0	4	0

	Score	
(Colombia) Juan Landázuri	5(SEN)–5	(Paraguay) Adol Servin
(Panama) Armando Mendoza	0–4	(Colombia) Juan Landázuri
(Paraguay) Adol Servin	3–4	(Panama) Armando Mendoza
(Chile) Matías Rodríguez	1(SEN)–1	(Colombia) Juan Landázuri
(Paraguay) Adol Servin	0–1	(Argentina) Julio Ichiki
(Argentina) Julio Ichiki	3–4	(Chile) Matías Rodríguez
(Chile) Matías Rodríguez	1–0	(Paraguay) Adol Servin
(Argentina) Julio Ichiki	3–2	(Panama) Armando Mendoza
(Panama) Armando Mendoza	0–4	(Chile) Matías Rodríguez
(Colombia) Juan Landázuri	2–1	(Argentina) Julio Ichiki

Finals

Semifinals
(Brazil) Alisson Sobrinho	6
(Colombia) Juan Landázuri	1
(Uruguay) Francisco Barrios	1
(Chile) Matías Rodríguez	7

Gold medal match
(Brazil) Alisson Sobrinho	2
(Chile) Matías Rodríguez	10

=== Men's 84 kg ===
Pool A

Rk	Athlete	Pld	W	L	Pts.
1	(Colombia) Rubén Henao	4	3	1	9
2	(Ecuador) José Acevedo	4	3	1	9
3	(Argentina) Juan Cruz	4	2	2	6
4	(Uruguay) Juan Alen Macedo	4	2	2	6
5	(Curaçao) Denzel Leito	4	0	4	0

	Score	
(Argentina) Juan Cruz	4–2	(Curaçao) Denzel Leito
(Ecuador) José Acevedo	–	(Colombia) Rubén Henao
(Uruguay) Juan Alen Macedo	1–10	(Argentina) Juan Cruz
(Curaçao) Denzel Leito	0–10	(Ecuador) José Acevedo
(Argentina) Juan Cruz	1–8	(Ecuador) José Acevedo
(Colombia) Rubén Henao	3–4	(Uruguay) Juan Alen Macedo
(Argentina) Juan Cruz	2–5	(Colombia) Rubén Henao
(Curaçao) Denzel Leito	2–2(SEN)	(Uruguay) Juan Alen Macedo
(Colombia) Rubén Henao	2–0	(Curaçao) Denzel Leito
(Uruguay) Juan Alen Macedo	3–5	(Ecuador) José Acevedo

Pool B

Rk	Athlete	Pld	W	L	Pts.
1	(Venezuela) Freddy Valera	4	4	0	12
2	(Paraguay) Jesús Servin	4	3	1	9
3	(Brazil) Diego Silva	4	2	2	6
4	(Chile) Fabián Huaiquiman	4	1	3	3
5	(Bolivia) Fernando Velasco	4	0	4	0

	Score	
(Paraguay) Jesús Servin	–	(Bolivia) Fernando Velasco
(Chile) Fabián Huaiquiman	4–5	(Brazil) Diego Silva
(Venezuela) Freddy Valera	3–1	(Paraguay) Jesús Servin
(Bolivia) Fernando Velasco	0–4	(Brazil) Diego Silva
(Brazil) Diego Silva	3–6	(Paraguay) Jesús Servin
(Venezuela) Freddy Valera	3–1	(Chile) Fabián Huaiquiman
(Paraguay) Jesús Servin	4–2	(Chile) Fabián Huaiquiman
(Bolivia) Fernando Velasco	0–8	(Venezuela) Freddy Valera
(Chile) Fabián Huaiquiman	5–0	(Bolivia) Fernando Velasco
(Brazil) Diego Silva	1–2	(Venezuela) Freddy Valera

Finals

Semifinals
(Colombia) Rubén Henao	1
(Paraguay) Jesús Servin	5
(Ecuador) José Acevedo	3
(Venezuela) Freddy Valera	1

Gold medal match
(Paraguay) Jesús Servin	0
(Ecuador) José Acevedo	8

=== Men's +84 kg ===
Pool A

Rk	Athlete	Pld	W	L	Pts.
1	(Brazil) Lucas Miranda	4	3	1	9
2	(Argentina) Marcos Molina	4	3	1	9
3	(Ecuador) Yeiro Mina	4	2	2	6
4	(Uruguay) Santiago Malian	4	2	2	6
5	(Bolivia) Nicolás Barron	4	0	4	0

	Score	
(Argentina) Marcos Molina	3–0	(Uruguay) Santiago Malian
(Bolivia) Nicolás Barron	3–4	(Ecuador) Yeiro Mina
(Brazil) Lucas Miranda	4–0	(Argentina) Marcos Molina
(Ecuador) Yeiro Mina	6–1	(Brazil) Lucas Miranda
(Uruguay) Santiago Malian	2–1	(Bolivia) Nicolás Barron
(Uruguay) Santiago Malian	0–2	(Brazil) Lucas Miranda
(Bolivia) Nicolás Barron	1–3	(Argentina) Marcos Molina
(Ecuador) Yeiro Mina	0–4	(Uruguay) Santiago Malian
(Argentina) Marcos Molina	3(SEN)–3	(Ecuador) Yeiro Mina
(Brazil) Lucas Miranda	8–0	(Bolivia) Nicolás Barron

Pool B

Rk	Athlete	Pld	W	D	L	Pts.
1	(Chile) Rodrigo Rojas	3	2	1	0	7
2	(Paraguay) Fernando Ramírez	3	2	1	0	7
3	(Venezuela) Crixon Guzman	3	1	0	2	3
4	(Peru) Kevin Roman	3	0	0	3	0

	Score	
(Paraguay) Fernando Ramírez	4–2	(Peru) Kevin Roman
(Venezuela) Crixon Guzman	1–2	(Chile) Rodrigo Rojas
(Peru) Kevin Roman	0–8	(Venezuela) Crixon Guzman
(Paraguay) Fernando Ramírez	0–0	(Chile) Rodrigo Rojas
(Venezuela) Crixon Guzman	0–2	(Paraguay) Fernando Ramírez
(Chile) Rodrigo Rojas	8–0	(Peru) Kevin Roman

Finals

Semifinals
(Brazil) Lucas Miranda	5
(Paraguay) Fernando Ramírez	4
(Argentina) Marcos Molina	2
(Chile) Rodrigo Rojas	3

Gold medal match
(Brazil) Lucas Miranda	2
(Chile) Rodrigo Rojas	4

=== Women's Individual Kata ===
Rank	Athlete	Nation	Qualifiers			Result
Rank	Athlete	Nation	Round 1	Round 2	Total	Result
1	Nicole Mota	Brazil	23.76	23.74	48	Gold medal match
2	Cristina Orbe	Ecuador	23.4	23.46	47	Bronze medal match
3	Julieta Mancilla	Argentina	21.48	21.76	43	Bronze medal match

Rank	Athlete	Nation	Qualifiers			Result
Rank	Athlete	Nation	Round 1	Round 2	Total	Result
1	Andrea Armada	Venezuela	22.88	23.48	46	Gold medal match
2	Ingrid Aranda	Peru	22.8	22.86	46	Bronze medal match
3	Aimi Larrosa	Paraguay	21.2	21.4	43	Bronze medal match

Gold medal match
(Brazil) Nicole Mota	24.48
(Venezuela) Andrea Armada	24.42

Bronze medal match
(Ecuador) Cristina Orbe	23.22
(Paraguay) Aimi Larrosa	20.86

Bronze medal match
(Peru) Ingrid Aranda	23.34
(Argentina) Julieta Mancilla	21.88

=== Women's 50 kg ===
Pool A

Rk	Athlete	Pld	W	D	L	Pts.
1	(Argentina) Yamila Benitez	3	1	1	1	4
2	(Peru) Claudia de la Cruz	3	1	1	1	4
3	(Chile) Fernanda Vega	3	1	0	2	3
4	(Ecuador) Lili Alvarado	3	1	0	2	3

	Score	
(Peru) Claudia de la Cruz	3–6	(Ecuador) Lili Alvarado
(Argentina) Yamila Benitez	7–0	(Chile) Fernanda Vega
(Ecuador) Lili Alvarado	0–1	(Chile) Fernanda Vega
(Peru) Claudia de la Cruz	2–2	(Argentina) Yamila Benitez
(Chile) Fernanda Vega	0–4	(Peru) Claudia de la Cruz
(Ecuador) Lili Alvarado	W–W	(Argentina) Yamila Benitez

Pool B

Rk	Athlete	Pld	W	L	Pts.
1	(Venezuela) Yorgelis Salazar	2	2	0	6
2	(Paraguay) Leyla Servin	2	1	1	3
3	(Brazil) Paula Freire	2	0	2	0

	Score	
(Paraguay) Leyla Servin	2–1	(Brazil) Paula Freire
(Venezuela) Yorgelis Salazar	8–0	(Paraguay) Layla Servin
(Brazil) Paula Freire	0–0(KI)	(Venezuela) Yorgelis Salazar

Finals

Semifinals
(Argentina) Yamila Benitez	3
(Paraguay) Leyla Servin	2
(Peru) Claudia de la Cruz	1
(Venezuela) Yorgelis Salazar	6

Gold medal match
(Argentina) Yamila Benitez	0
(Venezuela) Yorgelis Salazar	8

=== Women's 55 kg ===
Pool A

Rk	Athlete	Pld	W	L	Pts.
1	(Chile) Valentina Toro	4	4	0	12
2	(Paraguay) Yennifer Servin	4	3	1	9
3	(Colombia) Geraldine Peña	4	2	2	6
4	(Peru) Hiromi Sánchez	4	1	3	3
5	(Ecuador) Ileana Miranda	4	0	4	0

	Score	
(Peru) Hiromi Sánchez	2–4	(Paraguay) Yennifer Servin
(Colombia) Geraldine Peña	3–5	(Chile) Valentina Toro
(Peru) Hiromi Sánchez	2–0	(Ecuador) Ileana Miranda
(Paraguay) Yennifer Servin	11–4	(Colombia) Geraldine Peña
(Colombia) Geraldine Peña	3–1	(Peru) Hiromi Sánchez
(Ecuador) Ileana Miranda	1–3	(Chile) Valentina Toro
(Chile) Valentina Toro	4–0	(Peru) Hiromi Sánchez
(Paraguay) Yennifer Servin	5–3	(Ecuador) Ileana Miranda
(Chile) Valentina Toro	1–0	(Paraguay) Yennifer Servin
(Ecuador) Ileana Miranda	1–5	(Colombia) Geraldine Peña

Pool B

Rk	Athlete	Pld	W	D	L	Pts.
1	(Brazil) Valéria Kumizaki	4	4	0	0	12
2	(Argentina) Mickaela Novak	4	2	1	1	7
3	(Venezuela) Bárbara Pérez	4	2	0	2	6
4	(Panama) Yaremi Borzelli	4	1	1	2	4
5	(Bolivia) Marcela Herrera	4	0	0	4	0

	Score	
(Argentina) Mickaela Novak	1–1	(Panama) Yaremi Borzelli
(Venezuela) Bárbara Pérez	0–2	(Brazil) Valéria Kumizaki
(Argentina) Mickaela Novak	8–0	(Bolivia) Marcela Herrera
(Panama) Yaremi Borzelli	0–3	(Venezuela) Bárbara Pérez
(Venezuela) Bárbara Pérez	0–1	(Argentina) Mickaela Novak
(Bolivia) Marcela Herrera	0–10	(Brazil) Valéria Kumizaki
(Brazil) Valéria Kumizaki	2–1	(Argentina) Mickaela Novak
(Panama) Yaremi Borzelli	9–1	(Bolivia) Marcela Herrera
(Brazil) Valéria Kumizaki	1–0	(Panama) Yaremi Borzelli
(Bolivia) Marcela Herrera	0–5	(Venezuela) Bárbara Pérez

Finals

Semifinals
(Chile) Valentina Toro	0(HT)
(Argentina) Mickaela Novak	0
(Paraguay) Yennifer Servin	9
(Brazil) Valéria Kumizaki	4

Gold medal match
(Chile) Valentina Toro	4
(Paraguay) Yennifer Servin	0

=== Women's 61 kg ===
Pool A

Rk	Athlete	Pld	W	D	L	Pts.
1	(Peru) Alexandra Grande	4	3	1	0	10
2	(Venezuela) Claudymar Garcés	4	3	1	0	10
3	(Brazil) Sabrina Pereira	4	2	0	2	6
4	(Bolivia) Briza Sandoval	4	1	0	3	3
5	(Paraguay) Yennifer Meza	4	0	0	4	0

	Score	
(Brazil) Sabrina Pereira	1–1(SEN)	(Venezuela) Claudymar Garcés
(Paraguay) Yennifer Meza	0–8	(Peru) Alexandra Grande
(Bolivia) Briza Sandoval	1–4	(Brazil) Sabrina Pereira
(Venezuela) Claudymar Garcés	3–0	(Paraguay) Yennifer Meza
(Paraguay) Yennifer Meza	0–2	(Brazil) Sabrina Pereira
(Peru) Alexandra Grande	9–0	(Bolivia) Briza Sandoval
(Brazil) Sabrina Pereira	1–10	(Peru) Alexandra Grande
(Venezuela) Claudymar Garcés	8–0	(Bolivia) Briza Sandoval
(Bolivia) Briza Sandoval	8–6	(Paraguay) Yennifer Meza
(Peru) Alexandra Grande	0–0	(Venezuela) Claudymar Garcés

Pool B

Rk	Athlete	Pld	W	D	L	Pts.
1	(Chile) Bárbara Huaiquimán	3	2	1	0	7
2	(Argentina) Laura Díaz	3	2	1	0	7
3	(Ecuador) Jacqueline Factos	3	0	1	2	1
4	(Colombia) Diana Ramírez	3	0	1	2	1

	Score	
(Argentina) Laura Díaz	5–4	(Colombia) Diana Ramírez
(Ecuador) Jacqueline Factos	1–3	(Chile) Bárbara Huaiquimán
(Colombia) Diana Ramírez	0–8	(Chile) Bárbara Huaiquimán
(Argentina) Laura Díaz	5(SEN)–5	(Ecuador) Jacqueline Factos
(Chile) Bárbara Huaiquimán	1–1	(Argentina) Laura Díaz
(Colombia) Diana Ramírez	0–0	(Ecuador) Jacqueline Factos

Finals

Semifinals
(Peru) Alexandra Grande	4
(Argentina) Laura Díaz	2
(Venezuela) Claudymar Garcés	5(SEN)
(Chile) Bárbara Huaiquimán	5

Gold medal match
(Peru) Alexandra Grande	1
(Venezuela) Claudymar Garcés	0

=== Women's 68 kg ===
Pool A

Rk	Athlete	Pld	W	D	L	Pts.
1	(Colombia) Wendy Mosquera	3	2	1	0	7
2	(Venezuela) Marianth Cuervo	3	2	1	0	7
3	(Peru) Sol Cabrera	3	0	1	2	1
4	(Argentina) Selena Lujan	3	0	1	2	1

	Score	
(Argentina) Selena Lujan	0–0	(Peru) Sol Cabrera
(Colombia) Wendy Mosquera	0–0	(Venezuela) Marianth Cuervo
(Peru) Sol Cabrera	2–6	(Colombia) Wendy Mosquera
(Argentina) Selena Lujan	1–3	(Venezuela) Marianth Cuervo
(Argentina) Selena Lujan	0–7	(Colombia) Wendy Mosquera
(Peru) Sol Cabrera	0–8	(Venezuela) Marianth Cuervo

Pool B

Rk	Athlete	Pld	W	L	Pts.
1	(Brazil) Anna Prezzoti	2	2	0	6
2	(Chile) Ignacia Morales	2	1	1	3
3	(Bolivia) Nazira Aponte	2	0	2	0

	Score	
(Chile) Ignacia Morales	10–2	(Bolivia) Nazira Aponte
(Chile) Ignacia Morales	0–5	(Brazil) Anna Prezzoti
(Bolivia) Nazira Aponte	0–7	(Brazil) Anna Prezzoti

Finals

Semifinals
(Colombia) Wendy Mosquera	8
(Chile) Ignacia Morales	0
(Venezuela) Marianth Cuervo	0
(Brazil) Anna Prezzoti	6

Gold medal match
(Colombia) Wendy Mosquera	HE
(Brazil) Anna Prezzoti

=== Women's +68 kg ===
Pool A

Rk	Athlete	Pld	W	D	L	Pts.
1	(Ecuador) Valeria Echever	3	2	1	0	7
2	(Colombia) Shanee Torres	3	2	0	2	6
3	(Chile) Javiera González	3	1	1	1	4
4	(Bolivia) Renata Nieto	3	0	0	3	0

	Score	
(Chile) Javiera González	8–0	(Bolivia) Renata Nieto
(Colombia) Shanee Torres	1–2	(Ecuador) Valeria Echever
(Bolivia) Renata Nieto	0–1	(Colombia) Shanee Torres
(Chile) Javiera González	0–0	(Ecuador) Valeria Echever
(Chile) Javiera González	0–3	(Colombia) Shanee Torres
(Bolivia) Renata Nieto	3–6	(Ecuador) Valeria Echever

Pool B

Rk	Athlete	Pld	W	L	Pts.
1	(Venezuela) Oriana Rodríguez	3	3	0	9
2	(Brazil) Brenda Padilha	3	2	1	6
3	(Argentina) Valentina Castro	3	1	2	3
4	(Peru) Gianella Fernández	3	0	3	0

	Score	
(Argentina) Valentina Castro	1(1)–1(0)	(Peru) Gianella Fernández
(Venezuela) Oriana Rodríguez	2–1	(Brazil) Brenda Padilha
(Peru) Gianella Fernández	2–4	(Venezuela) Oriana Rodríguez
(Argentina) Valentina Castro	0–5	(Brazil) Brenda Padilha
(Argentina) Valentina Castro	0–4	(Venezuela) Oriana Rodríguez
(Peru) Gianella Fernández	0–2	(Brazil) Brenda Padilha

Finals

Semifinals
(Ecuador) Valeria Echever	2
(Brazil) Brenda Padilha	0
(Colombia) Shanee Torres	3
(Venezuela) Oriana Rodríguez	2

Gold medal match
(Ecuador) Valeria Echever	1(1)
(Colombia) Shanee Torres	1(0)
