= Mariano Wong =

Peruvian karateka (born 1997)

Personal information
- Born: 3 July 1997 (age 29)

Sport
- Country: Peru
- Sport: Karate
- Event: Individual kata
Medal record
Men's karate
Representing Peru
Pan American Games
Bronze medal – third place	2019 Lima	Individual kata
South American Games
Silver medal – second place	2022 Asunción	Individual kata
Bronze medal – third place	2018 Cochabamba	Individual kata
Bolivarian Games
Silver medal – second place	2024 Ayacucho	Individual kata
Bronze medal – third place	2022 Valledupar	Individual kata
Bronze medal – third place	2025 Lima-Ayacucho	Team kata

Mariano Wong (born 3 July 1997) is a Peruvian karateka. At the 2019 Pan American Games held in Lima, Peru, he won one of the bronze medals in the men's kata event.

== Career ==
In 2018, he won one of the bronze medals in the men's kata event at the South American Games held in Cochabamba, Bolivia. In the same year, he also competed in the men's individual kata event at the World Karate Championships held in Madrid, Spain.

In June 2021, he competed at the World Olympic Qualification Tournament held in Paris, France hoping to qualify for the 2020 Summer Olympics in Tokyo, Japan. In November 2021, he competed at the 2021 World Karate Championships held in Dubai, United Arab Emirates.

He won one of the bronze medals in the men's kata event at the 2022 Bolivarian Games held in Valledupar, Colombia. He won the silver medal in his event at the 2022 South American Games held in Asunción, Paraguay.

== Achievements ==
Year	Competition	Venue	Rank	Event
2018	South American Games	Cochabamba, Bolivia	3rd	Individual kata
2019	Pan American Games	Lima, Peru	3rd	Individual kata
2022	Bolivarian Games	Valledupar, Colombia	3rd	Individual kata
2022	South American Games	Asunción, Paraguay	2nd	Individual kata
2024	Bolivarian Games	Ayacucho, Peru	2nd	Individual kata
