= Karate at the 2023 Pan American Games – Women's +68 kg =

Women's +68 kg at the 2023 Pan American Games
- Venue: Contact Sports Center
- Dates: November 3
- Competitors: 9 from 9 nations

Medalists
Gold medal	Guadalupe Quintal	Mexico
Silver medal	Valeria Echever	Ecuador
Bronze medal	Pamela Rodríguez	Dominican Republic
Bronze medal	Brenda Padilha	Brazil

The women's +68 kg competition of the karate events at the 2023 Pan American Games was held on November 3 at the Contact Sports Center (Centro de Entrenamiento de los Deportes de Contacto) in Santiago, Chile.

== Schedule ==
Date	Time	Round
November 3, 2023	14:00	Pool matches
November 3, 2023	16:45	Semifinals
November 3, 2023	17:13	Final

== Results ==
The athletes with the two best scores of each pool advance to the semifinals.

=== Pool A ===
Rk	Athlete	Pld	W	L	Pts.
1	Valeria Echever (ECU)	3	2	1	6
2	Guadalupe Quintal (MEX)	3	2	1	6
3	Kelara Madani (USA)	3	1	2	3
4	Lily-Rose Nolet (CAN)	3	1	2	3

	Score	
Lily-Rose Nolet (CAN)	0–2	Kelara Madani (USA)
Valeria Echever (ECU)	5–4	Guadalupe Quintal (MEX)
Lily-Rose Nolet (CAN)	8–3	Valeria Echever (ECU)
Kelara Madani (USA)	1–6	Guadalupe Quintal (MEX)
Kelara Madani (USA)	3–6	Valeria Echever (ECU)
Lily-Rose Nolet (CAN)	0–5	Guadalupe Quintal (MEX)

=== Pool B ===
Rk	Athlete	Pld	W	L	Pts.
1	Brenda Padilha (BRA)	4	4	0	12
2	Pamela Rodríguez (DOM)	4	2	2	6
3	Javiera González (CHI)	4	2	2	6
4	Shanee Torres (COL)	4	2	2	6
5	Gianella Fernández (PER)	4	0	4	0

	Score	
Brenda Padilha (BRA)	5–3	Pamela Rodríguez (DOM)
Javiera González (CHI)	8–2	Shanee Torres (COL)
Brenda Padilha (BRA)	2–0	Gianella Fernández (PER)
Pamela Rodriguez (DOM)	8–1	Javiera González (CHI)
Brenda Padilha (BRA)	4–3	Shanee Torres (COL)
Pamela Rodríguez (DOM)	5–2	Gianella Fernández (PER)
Brenda Padilha (BRA)	5–1	Javiera González (CHI)
Shanee Torres (COL)	1–0	Gianella Fernández (PER)
Pamela Rodríguez (DOM)	2–2	Shanee Torres (COL)
Javiera González (CHI)	7–3	Gianella Fernández (PER)

=== Finals ===
The results were as follows:

Semifinals
Valeria Echever (ECU)	11
Pamela Rodríguez (DOM)	6
Brenda Padilha (BRA)	2
Guadalupe Quintal (MEX)	3

Gold medal match
Valeria Echever (ECU)	1
Guadalupe Quintal (MEX)	2
