= Karate at the 2022 Bolivarian Games =

Karate competition

- Dates: 25–27 June

The karate event at the 2022 Bolivarian Games was held from 25 to 27 June 2022 at the Coliseo Colegio Comfacesar Rodolfo Campo Soto in Valledupar, Colombia.

== Medal table ==
* Host nation (Colombia)

Rank	Nation	Gold	Silver	Bronze	Total
1	Colombia*	4	1	2	7
2	Chile	3	0	6	9
3	Venezuela	2	3	3	8
4	Guatemala	2	3	2	7
5	Dominican Republic	2	2	2	6
6	Ecuador	1	2	3	6
7	Peru	0	1	4	5
8	Panama	0	1	3	4
9	Paraguay	0	1	1	2
10	Bolivia	0	0	1	1
10	El Salvador	0	0	1	1
Totals (11 entries)		14	14	28	56

== Medalists ==
=== Men ===
Event	Gold	Silver	Bronze
Kata	Cleiver Casanova; Venezuela	Larry Aracena; Dominican Republic	Mariano Wong; Peru Héctor Cención; Panama
Kumite –60 kg	Juan Fernández; Colombia	Pedropablo de la Roca; Guatemala	Enrique Villalón; Chile Roberto Payares; Panama
Kumite –67 kg	Andrés Madera; Venezuela	Alberto Gálvez; Panama	Fred Proaño; Ecuador Tomás Freire; Chile
Kumite –75 kg	Juan Landázuri; Colombia	Allan Maldonado; Guatemala	Matías Rodríguez; Chile Carlos Herrera; Dominican Republic
Kumite –84 kg	José Acevedo; Ecuador	Anderson Soriano; Dominican Republic	Brandon Ramírez; Guatemala Jorge Merino; El Salvador
Kumite +84 kg	Rodrigo Rojas; Chile	Fernando Ramírez; Paraguay	Diego Lenis; Colombia Nicolás Barrón; Bolivia
Team kumite	Colombia; Juan Fernández; Rubén Henao; Juan Landázuri; Diego Lenis; José Ramírez	Ecuador; José Acevedo; Douglas Ayala; Luis Choez; Yeiro Mina; Fred Proaño	Chile; Tomás Freire; Benjamín Núñez; Matías Rodríguez; Rodrigo Rojas; Enrique Villalón Venezuela; Edgar Chávez; Andrés Madera; Jhosed Ortuño; César Riera; Freddy Valera

=== Women ===
Event	Gold	Silver	Bronze
Kata	María Dimitrova; Dominican Republic	Ingrid Aranda; Peru	Cristina Orbe; Ecuador Andrea Armada; Venezuela
Kumite –50 kg	Bárbara Morales; Guatemala	Yorgelis Salazar; Venezuela	Fernanda Vega; Chile Leyla Servín; Paraguay
Kumite –55 kg	Valentina Toro; Chile	Ileana Miranda; Ecuador	Yaremi Borzelli; Panama Hiromi Sanchez; Peru
Kumite –61 kg	María Renée Wong; Guatemala	Claudymar Garcés; Venezuela	Diana Ramírez; Colombia Linda Rodríguez; Peru
Kumite –68 kg	Wendy Mosquera; Colombia	Luisa Fernanda; Guatemala	Sol Cabrera; Peru Marianth Cuervo; Venezuela
Kumite +68 kg	Pamela Rodríguez; Dominican Republic	Shanee Torres; Colombia	Valeria Echever; Ecuador Javiera González; Chile
Team kumite	Chile; Javiera González; Ignacia Morales; Valentina Toro; Fernanda Vega; Carolina Videla	Venezuela; Marianth Cuervo; Claudymar Garcés; Bárbara Pérez; Yorgelis Salazar; María Urdaneta	Guatemala; Fabiana Cevasco; Luisa Fernanda; Bárbara Morales; María Wong Dominican Republic; María Dimitrova; Pamela Rodríguez; Tanya Rodríguez; Thalía Terrero
