= Karate at the 2023 Pan American Games – Women's 61 kg =

Women's 61 kg at the 2023 Pan American Games
- Venue: Contact Sports Center
- Dates: November 4
- Competitors: 9 from 9 nations

Medalists
Gold medal	Janessa Fonseca	Puerto Rico
Silver medal	Alexandra Grande	Peru
Bronze medal	Claudymar Garcés	Venezuela
Bronze medal	María Renée Wong	Independent Athletes Team

The women's 61 kg competition of the karate events at the 2023 Pan American Games was held on November 4 at the Contact Sports Center (Centro de Entrenamiento de los Deportes de Contacto) in Santiago, Chile.

== Schedule ==
Date	Time	Round
November 4, 2023	14:00	Pool matches
November 4, 2023	17:00	Semifinals
November 4, 2023	17:28	Final

== Results ==
The athletes with the two best scores of each pool advance to the semifinals.

=== Pool A ===
Rk	Athlete	Pld	W	L	Pts.
1	Janessa Fonseca (PUR)	3	3	0	9
2	Alexandra Grande (PER)	3	2	1	6
3	Bárbara Huaiquimán (CHI)	3	1	2	3
4	Alexandra Wainwright (USA)	3	0	3	0

	Score	
Alexandra Grande (PER)	5–6	Janessa Fonseca (PUR)
Alexandra Wainwright (USA)	2–4	Bárbara Huaiquimán (CHI)
Alexandra Grande (PER)	2–0	Alexandra Wainwright (USA)
Janessa Fonseca (PUR)	9–1	Bárbara Huaiquimán (CHI)
Janessa Fonseca (PUR)	8–0	Alexandra Wainwright (USA)
Alexandra Grande (PER)	3–1	Bárbara Huaiquimán (CHI)

=== Pool B ===
Rk	Athlete	Pld	W	L	Pts.
1	María Renée Wong (EAI)	4	3	1	9
2	Claudymar Garcés (VEN)	4	3	1	9
3	Diana Ramírez (COL)	4	2	2	6
4	Laura Díaz (ARG)	4	1	3	3
5	Lianerkis Chacón (CUB)	4	1	3	3

	Score	
Laura Díaz (ARG)	0–3	Diana Ramírez (COL)
María Renée Wong (EAI)	4–0	Claudymar Garcés (VEN)
Laura Díaz (ARG)	5–0	Lianerkis Chacón (CUB)
Diana Ramírez (COL)	8–0	María Renée Wong (EAI)
Laura Díaz (ARG)	1–7	Claudymar Garcés (VEN)
Diana Ramírez (COL)	3–6	Lianerkis Chacón (CUB)
Laura Díaz (ARG)	3–5	María Renée Wong (EAI)
Lianerkis Chacón (CUB)	1–4	Claudymar Garcés (VEN)
Diana Ramírez (COL)	2–10	Claudymar Garcés (VEN)
María Renée Wong (EAI)	3–1	Lianerkis Chacón (CUB)

=== Finals ===
The results were as follows:

Semifinals
Janessa Fonseca (PUR)	7
Claudymar Garcés (VEN)	6
María Renée Wong (EAI)	4
Alexandra Grande (PER)	5

Gold medal match
Janessa Fonseca (PUR)	10
Alexandra Grande (PER)	7
