= Valentina Toro =

Chilean karateka (born 2000)

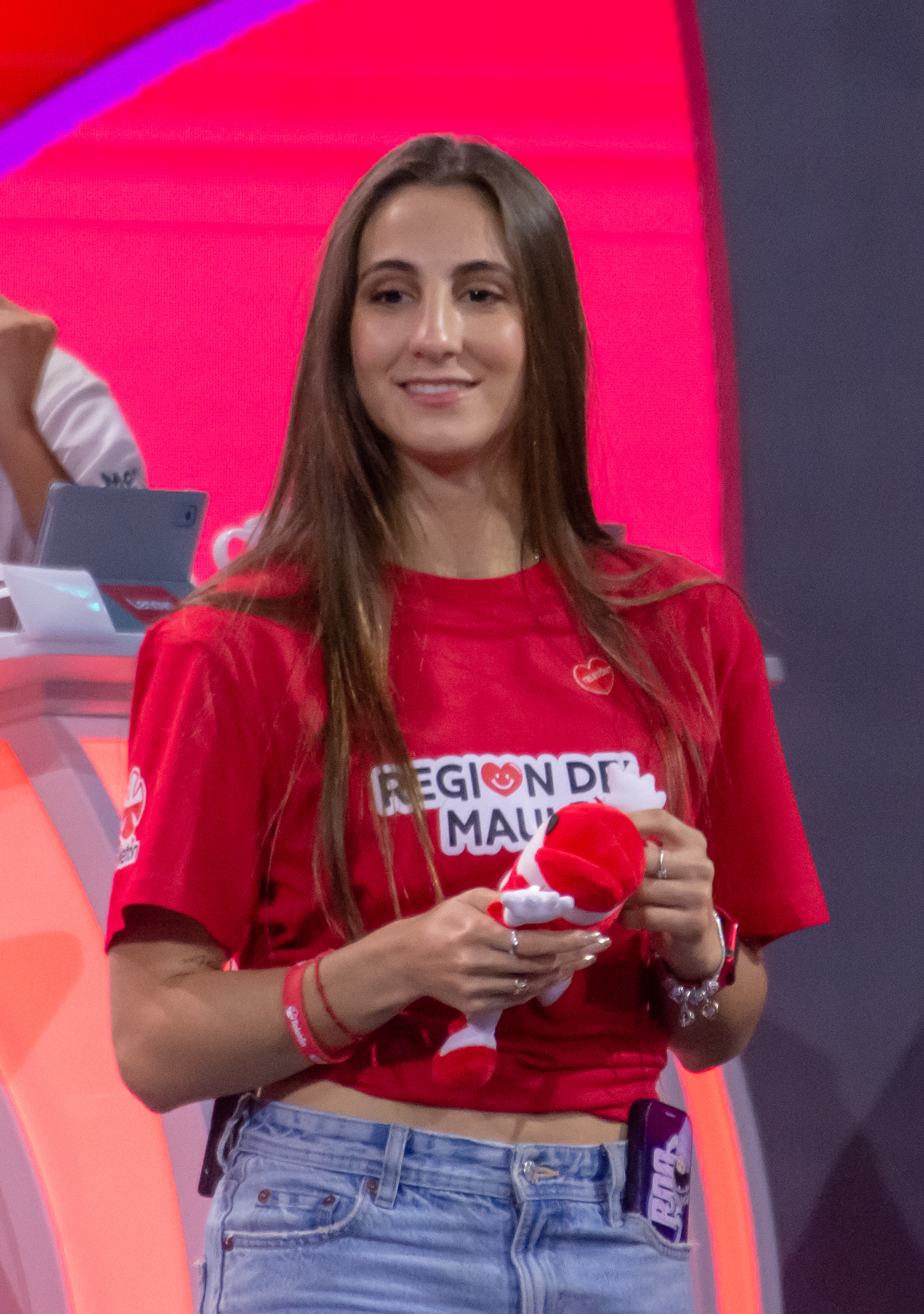
- Teletón 2023

Personal information
- Full name: Valentina Ivanina Toro Meneses
- Born: 17 February 2000 (age 26)

Sport
- Country: Chile
- Sport: Karate
- Weight class: 55 kg
- Events: Kumite; Team kumite
Medal record
Women's karate
Representing Chile
World Games
Bronze medal – third place	2025 Chengdu	Kumite 55 kg
Pan American Games
Gold medal – first place	2023 Santiago	Kumite 55 kg
South American Games
Gold medal – first place	2022 Asunción	Kumite 55 kg
Bolivarian Games
Gold medal – first place	2022 Valledupar	Kumite 55 kg
Gold medal – first place	2022 Valledupar	Team kumite

Valentina Ivanina Toro Meneses (born 17 February 2000) is a Chilean karateka. She won the gold medal in the women's 55 kg event at the 2022 South American Games held in Asunción, Paraguay. She also won the gold medal in her event at the 2022 Bolivarian Games held in Valledupar, Colombia.

In June 2021, Toro competed at the World Olympic Qualification Tournament held in Paris, France hoping to qualify for the 2020 Summer Olympics in Tokyo, Japan. In November 2021, she competed in the women's 55 kg event at the 2021 World Karate Championships held in Dubai, United Arab Emirates.

Toro was also one of the flag bearers for Chile during the opening ceremony of the 2022 South American Games. In 2023, she won the gold medal in her event at the Pan American Games held in Santiago, Chile. She defeated Baurelys Torres of Cuba in her gold medal match.

Toro won the bronze medal in the women's 55 kg event at the 2025 World Games held in Chengdu, China.

Toro studies industrial engineering at the University of Santiago, Chile.

== Achievements ==
Year	Competition	Location	Rank	Event
2022	Bolivarian Games	Valledupar, Colombia	1st	Kumite 55 kg
2022	Bolivarian Games	Valledupar, Colombia	1st	Team kumite
2022	South American Games	Asunción, Paraguay	1st	Kumite 55 kg
2023	Pan American Games	Santiago, Chile	1st	Kumite 55 kg
2025	World Games	Chengdu, China	3rd	Kumite 55 kg
