= Karate at the 2026 Central American and Caribbean Games =

- Venue: Centro Olímpico Juan Pablo Duarte
- Location: Santo Domingo, Dominican Republic
- Start date: 5 August 2026
- End date: 7 August 2026

The karate competition at the 2026 Central American and Caribbean Games was held in Santo Domingo, Dominican Republic, from 5 to 7 August 2026 at the Centro Olímpico Juan Pablo Duarte.

== Medal table ==
* Host nation (Dominican Republic)

Rank	Nation	Gold	Silver	Bronze	Total
1	Dominican Republic (DOM)*	5	3	3	11
2	Colombia (COL)	3	2	4	9
3	Venezuela (VEN)	2	5	5	12
4	Guatemala (GUA)	2	1	0	3
5	Cuba (CUB)	1	3	1	5
6	Puerto Rico (PUR)	1	0	2	3
7	Mexico (MEX)	0	0	7	7
8	El Salvador (ESA)	0	0	3	3
9	Costa Rica (CRC)	0	0	1	1
9	Nicaragua (NCA)	0	0	1	1
9	Panama (PAN)	0	0	1	1
Totals (11 entries)		14	14	28	56

== Medal summary ==
=== Kata ===
Event	Gold	Silver	Bronze
Men's individual	Larry Aracena; Dominican Republic	Fernando Calderón; Guatemala	Hernán Amaya; Colombia
Men's individual	Larry Aracena; Dominican Republic	Fernando Calderón; Guatemala	Cleiver Casanova; Venezuela
Men's team	Colombia; Samuel Giraldo; Danny Díaz; Alejandro Ramírez	Cuba; Yordeivis Nuñez; Freddy Ares; Víctor Sánchez	Dominican Republic; Heriberto De Castro; Jaime Teruel; Larry Aracena
Men's team	Colombia; Samuel Giraldo; Danny Díaz; Alejandro Ramírez	Cuba; Yordeivis Nuñez; Freddy Ares; Víctor Sánchez	Venezuela; Miguel Galindo; Luis Rojas; Jorge Durán
Women's individual	María Dimitrova; Dominican Republic	Valentina Zapata; Colombia	Daniela García; Venezuela
Women's individual	María Dimitrova; Dominican Republic	Valentina Zapata; Colombia	Layla Ocaña; Puerto Rico
Women's team	Dominican Republic; Carla Espejo; Perla Peralta; María Dimitrova	Venezuela; Stephany Ferreira; Victoria Hernández; Isabella Marchena	Colombia; Anyi Montes; Leidy Castaño; Sara Cardona
Women's team	Dominican Republic; Carla Espejo; Perla Peralta; María Dimitrova	Venezuela; Stephany Ferreira; Victoria Hernández; Isabella Marchena	Mexico; Yaneth Quiroz; Ana Martínez; Pamela Contreras

=== Men's kumite ===
Event	Gold	Silver	Bronze
60 kg	Pedro de la Roca; Guatemala	Wilmer Pérez; Venezuela	Pedro Recinos; El Salvador
60 kg	Pedro de la Roca; Guatemala	Wilmer Pérez; Venezuela	Juan Forero; Colombia
67 kg	Lousbel Velázquez; Cuba	Alan Miquelena; Venezuela	Luis Torres; Puerto Rico
67 kg	Lousbel Velázquez; Cuba	Alan Miquelena; Venezuela	Alberto Gálvez; Panama
75 kg	Allan Maldonado; Guatemala	Carlos Herrera; Dominican Republic	Gabriel Vargas; Costa Rica
75 kg	Allan Maldonado; Guatemala	Carlos Herrera; Dominican Republic	José Ávila; Mexico
84 kg	Rubén Henao; Colombia	Anderson Soriano; Dominican Republic	Jesús Moreno; Mexico
84 kg	Rubén Henao; Colombia	Anderson Soriano; Dominican Republic	Luis Vásquez; Venezuela
+84 kg	Sergio Rodríguez; Colombia	Crixon Guzmán; Venezuela	Anel Castillo; Dominican Republic
+84 kg	Sergio Rodríguez; Colombia	Crixon Guzmán; Venezuela	Pablo Benavides; Mexico

=== Women's kumite ===
Event	Gold	Silver	Bronze
50 kg	Yorgelis Salazar; Venezuela	Nayelis Guzmán; Dominican Republic	Joysi Tinoco; Nicaragua
50 kg	Yorgelis Salazar; Venezuela	Nayelis Guzmán; Dominican Republic	Katia Salcido; Mexico
55 kg	Thalía Terrero; Dominican Republic	Baurelys Torres; Cuba	Bárbara Pérez; Venezuela
55 kg	Thalía Terrero; Dominican Republic	Baurelys Torres; Cuba	Mariana Noreña; Colombia
61 kg	Penélope Polanco; Dominican Republic	Claudymar Garcés; Venezuela	Stephanie Juárez; El Salvador
61 kg	Penélope Polanco; Dominican Republic	Claudymar Garcés; Venezuela	Bárbara Lynn; Cuba
68 kg	Janessa Fonseca; Puerto Rico	Wendy Mosquera; Colombia	Karen Madera; Dominican Republic
68 kg	Janessa Fonseca; Puerto Rico	Wendy Mosquera; Colombia	Paola Rubio; Mexico
+68 kg	Oriana Rodríguez; Venezuela	Juana Parra; Cuba	Guadalupe Quintal; Mexico
+68 kg	Oriana Rodríguez; Venezuela	Juana Parra; Cuba	Andrea Ruiz; El Salvador
