= Karate at the 2023 Pan American Games – Men's +84 kg =

Men's +84 kg at the 2023 Pan American Games
- Venue: Contact Sports Center
- Dates: November 4
- Competitors: 9 from 8 nations

Medalists
Gold medal	Rodrigo Rojas	Chile
Silver medal	Lucas Miranda	Brazil
Bronze medal	Rob Timmermans	Aruba
Bronze medal	Giovani Salgado	Brazil

The men's +84 kg competition of the karate events at the 2023 Pan American Games was held on November 4 at the Contact Sports Center (Centro de Entrenamiento de los Deportes de Contacto) in Santiago, Chile.

== Schedule ==
Date	Time	Round
November 4, 2023	14:00	Pool matches
November 4, 2023	16:46	Semifinals
November 4, 2023	17:35	Final

== Results ==
The athletes with the two best scores of each pool advance to the semifinals.

=== Pool A ===
Rk	Athlete	Pld	W	L	Pts.
1	Rob Timmermans (ARU)	3	3	0	9
2	Giovani Salgado (BRA)	3	2	1	6
3	Melvin Oporta (NCA)	3	1	2	3
4	Diego Lenis (COL)	3	0	3	0

	Score	
Rob Timmermans (ARU)	2–1	Giovani Salgado (BRA)
Diego Lenis (COL)	3–7	Melvin Oporta (NCA)
Rob Timmermans (ARU)	2–0	Diego Lenis (COL)
Giovani Salgado (BRA)	4–2	Melvin Oporta (NCA)
Giovani Salgado (BRA)	5–4	Diego Lenis (COL)
Rob Timmermans (ARU)	3–1	Melvin Oporta (NCA)

=== Pool B ===
Rk	Athlete	Pld	W	L	Pts.
1	Rodrigo Rojas (CHI)	4	4	0	12
2	Lucas Miranda (BRA)	4	2	1	7
3	Brian Irr (USA)	4	2	1	7
4	Anel Castillo (DOM)	4	1	3	3
5	Marcos Molina (ARG)	4	0	4	0

	Score	
Rodrigo Rojas (CHI)	4–0	Anel Castillo (DOM)
Lucas Miranda (BRA)	9–0	Marcos Molina (ARG)
Rodrigo Rojas (CHI)	2–0	Brian Irr (USA)
Anel Castillo (DOM)	3–6	Lucas Miranda (BRA)
Rodrigo Rojas (CHI)	9–0	Marcos Molina (ARG)
Anel Castillo (DOM)	2–5	Brian Irr (USA)
Rodrigo Rojas (CHI)	5–4	Lucas Fernandes (BRA)
Brian Irr (USA)	10–3	Marcos Molina (ARG)
Anel Castillo (DOM)	5–0	Marcos Molina (ARG)
Lucas Miranda (BRA)	1–1	Brian Irr (USA)

=== Finals ===
The results were as follows:

Semifinals
Rob Timmermans (ARU)	1
Lucas Miranda (BRA)	7
Rodrigo Rojas (CHI)	2
Giovani Salgado (BRA)	2

Gold medal match
Lucas Miranda (BRA)	1
Rodrigo Rojas (CHI)	2
