= 2021 World Karate Championships – Women's team kumite =

World Karate Championship

Women's team kumite at the 2021 World Karate Championships
- Venue: Hamdan Sports Complex
- Location: Dubai, United Arab Emirates
- Dates: 18–21 November
- Nations: 51
- Teams: 51

Medalists
| gold medal | Feryal Abdelaziz; Sohila Abouismail; Yasmin Elhawary; Menna Shaaban Okila | Egypt |
| silver medal | Alizée Agier; Léa Avazeri; Laura Sivert; Jennifer Zameto | France |
| bronze medal | Lorena Busà; Clio Ferracuti; Alessandra Mangiacapra; Silvia Semeraro | Italy |
| bronze medal | Wendy Mosquera; Geraldine Peña; Diana Ramírez; Shanee Torres | Colombia |

The Women's team kumite competition at the 2021 World Karate Championships was held from 18 to 21 November 2021.

== Results ==
=== Finals ===
Semifinals
Egypt | 1
Japan | 1
Montenegro | 0
France | 2

Final
Egypt | 2
France | 1

=== Repechage ===
Repechage 1
Belarus | 1
Ukraine | 1

Repechage 2
Ukraine | 1
Italy | 2

Bronze medal
Italy | 2
Japan | 1

Repechage 1
Croatia | 2
Kenya | 0

Repechage 2
Croatia | 0
Colombia | 2

Bronze medal
Colombia | 2
Montenegro | 1

=== Top half ===
==== Section 1 ====
First round
Azerbaijan | 1
Italy | 2
Hungary | 1
Denmark | 0
RKF | 2
Kosovo | 0
United States | 1
Ukraine | 1
Belarus | 2
Uzbekistan | 1

Second round
Italy | 2
Hungary | 0
RKF | 1
England | 2
Ukraine | 2
Algeria | 0
Belarus | 0
Egypt | 2

Third round
Italy | 2
England | 1
Ukraine | 0
Egypt | 1

Quarterfinals
Italy | 1
Egypt | 2

==== Section 2 ====
First round
Turkey | 2
Ecuador | 0
Chile | 0
Brazil | 2
Hong Kong | 0
Romania | 2
Finland | 0
Germany | 2
Slovenia | 0
Slovakia | 2

Second round
Turkey | 2
Brazil | 1
Romania | 0
INAKF | 2
Germany | 2
United Arab Emirates | 0
Slovakia | 0
Japan | 2

Third round
Turkey | 2
INAKF | 0
Germany | 0
Japan | 2

Quarterfinals
Turkey | 1
Japan | 2

=== Bottom half ===
==== Section 3 ====
First round
Sweden | 2
Canada | 1
Morocco | 0
Montenegro | 0
Chinese Taipei | 1
Bosnia and Herzegovina | 2
Greece | 2
North Macedonia | 0
Switzerland | 1
THAKF | 1

Second round
Sweden | 0
Montenegro | 2
Bosnia and Herzegovina | 2
Norway | 0
Greece | 2
Kazakhstan | 0
Switzerland | 1
Spain | 2

Third round
Montenegro | 2
Bosnia and Herzegovina | 0
Greece | 1
Spain | 2

Quarterfinals
Montenegro | 1
Spain | 1

==== Section 4 ====
First round
Serbia | 1
Colombia | 1
Belgium | 0
Austria | 2
Turkmenistan | 1
Australia | 2
Croatia | 2
South Africa | 0

Second round
Colombia | 2
Cyprus | 1
Austria | 2
India | 0
Australia | 0
Kenya | 2
Croatia | 0
France | 2

Third round
Colombia | 2
Austria | 0
Kenya | 0
France | 2

Quarterfinals
Colombia | 0
France | 1
