= Ingrid Aranda =

Peruvian karateka (born 1992)

Personal information
- Full name: Ingrid Lizbeth Aranda Javes
- Born: 21 December 1992 (age 33)

Sport
- Country: Peru
- Sport: Karate
- Events: Individual kata; Team kata
Medal record
Women's karate
Representing Peru
Pan American Games
Bronze medal – third place	2019 Lima	Individual kata
South American Games
Gold medal – first place	2018 Cochabamba	Individual kata
Bronze medal – third place	2022 Asunción	Individual kata
Bolivarian Games
Gold medal – first place	2013 Trujillo	Team kata
Silver medal – second place	2022 Valledupar	Individual kata
Silver medal – second place	2025 Lima-Ayacucho	Individual kata

Ingrid Lizbeth Aranda Javes (Note: In this Spanish name, the first or paternal surname is Aranda and the second or maternal family name is Javes.) (born 21 December 1992) is a Peruvian karateka. She won the gold medal in the women's individual kata event at the 2018 South American Games held in Cochabamba, Bolivia. In 2019, she won one of the bronze medals in the women's individual kata event at the Pan American Games held in Lima, Peru.

== Career ==
In 2018, Aranda won the gold medal in the women's individual kata event at the South American Games held in Cochabamba, Bolivia. In the same year, she also competed in the women's individual kata event at the 2018 World Karate Championships held in Madrid, Spain.

In June 2021, Aranda competed at the World Olympic Qualification Tournament held in Paris, France hoping to qualify for the 2020 Summer Olympics in Tokyo, Japan. In November 2021, she competed at the World Karate Championships held in Dubai, United Arab Emirates.

She won the silver medal in the women's kata event at the 2022 Bolivarian Games held in Valledupar, Colombia. She won one of the bronze medals in her event at the 2022 South American Games held in Asunción, Paraguay.

== Achievements ==
Year	Competition	Venue	Rank	Event
2013	Bolivarian Games	Trujillo, Peru	1st	Team kata
2018	South American Games	Cochabamba, Bolivia	1st	Individual kata
2019	Pan American Games	Lima, Peru	3rd	Individual kata
2022	Bolivarian Games	Valledupar, Colombia	2nd	Individual kata
2022	South American Games	Asunción, Paraguay	3rd	Individual kata
