= Alexandra Grande =

Peruvian karateka (born 1990)

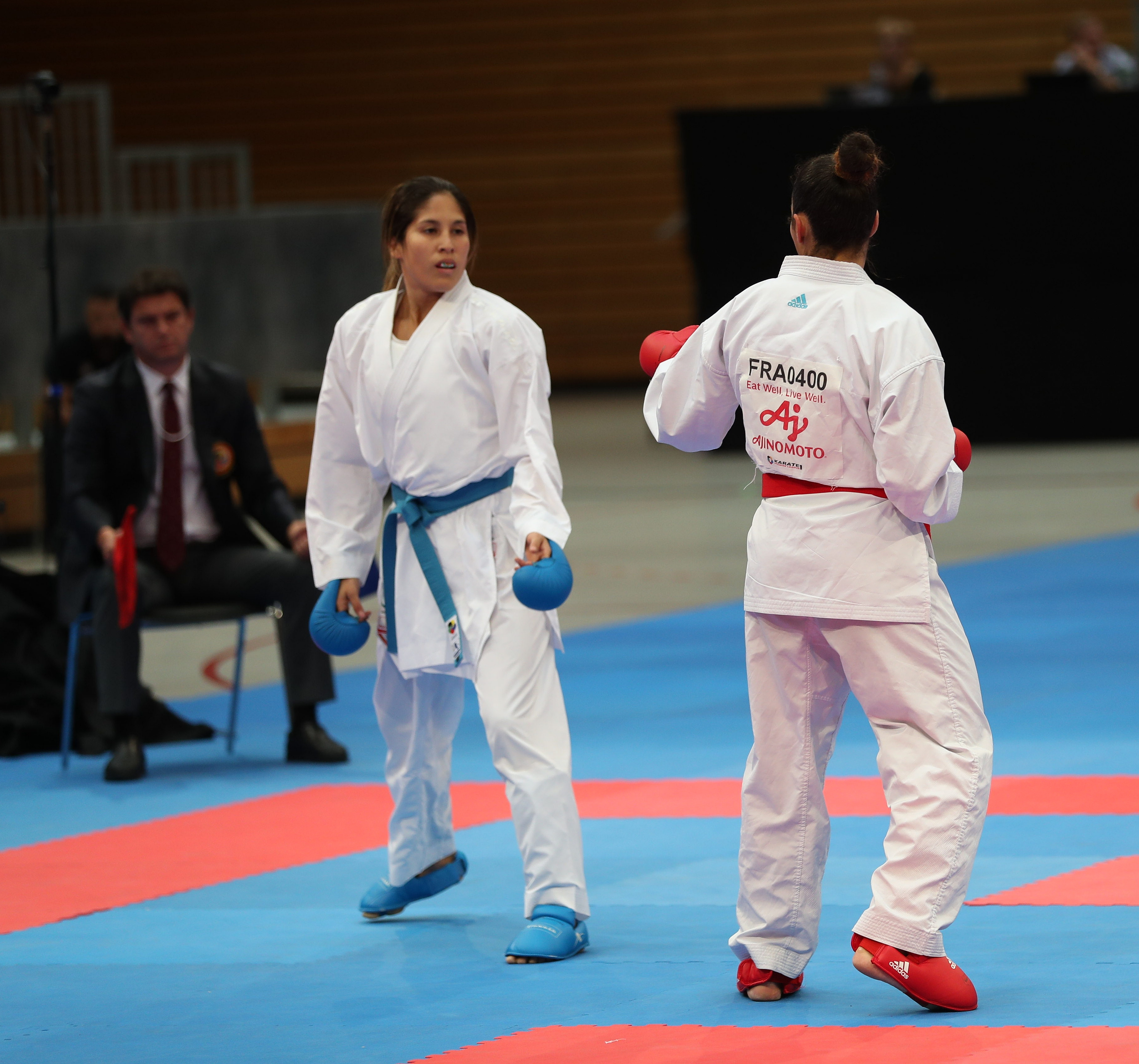
- Grande in 2018

Personal information
- Full name: Alexandra Vanessa Grande Risco
- Born: 5 February 1990 (age 36)

Sport
- Country: Peru
- Sport: Karate
- Weight class: 61 kg
- Event: Kumite
Medal record
Women's karate
Representing Peru
World Championships
Bronze medal – third place	2021 Dubai	Kumite 61 kg
Pan American Games
Gold medal – first place	2015 Toronto	Kumite 61 kg
Gold medal – first place	2019 Lima	Kumite 61 kg
Silver medal – second place	2011 Guadalajara	Kumite 61 kg
Silver medal – second place	2023 Santiago	Kumite 61 kg
South American Games
Gold medal – first place	2010 Medellín	Kumite 61 kg
Gold medal – first place	2022 Asunción	Kumite 61 kg
Silver medal – second place	2018 Cochabamba	Kumite 61 kg
Bronze medal – third place	2010 Medellín	Open
World Games
Gold medal – first place	2017 Wrocław	Kumite 61 kg
Silver medal – second place	2022 Birmingham	Kumite 61 kg
Bolivarian Games
Silver medal – second place	2013 Trujillo	Team kumite
Silver medal – second place	2025 Lima-Ayacucho	Kumite 61 kg
World Combat Games
Bronze medal – third place	2010 Beijing	Kumite 61 kg

Alexandra Vanessa Grande Risco (Note: In this Spanish name, the first or paternal surname is Grande and the second or maternal family name is Risco.) (born 5 February 1990) is a Peruvian karateka. She is a two-time gold medalist in the women's 61 kg event at the Pan American Games. She also won bronze in this event at the 2021 World Karate Championships in Dubai, United Arab Emirates. In 2021, Grande represented Peru at the 2020 Summer Olympics in Tokyo, Japan. She competed in the women's 61 kg event.

== Career ==
Grande won the bronze medal in the women's 61 kg event at the 2010 World Combat Games held in Beijing, China. She represented Peru at the 2017 World Games held in Wrocław, Poland and she won the gold medal in the women's kumite 61 kg event. Grande defeated Anita Serogina of Ukraine in her gold medal match.

In 2018, Grande won the silver medal in the women's kumite 61 kg event at the South American Games held in Cochabamba, Bolivia after a defeat in the final against Jacqueline Factos of Ecuador.

Grande won the gold medal in the women's kumite 61 kg event at the 2019 Pan American Games held in Lima, Peru. Four years earlier, she also won the gold medal in the women's kumite 61 kg event at the 2015 Pan American Games. In 2011, Grande won the silver medal in the same event at the Pan American Games in Guadalajara, Mexico.

In June 2021, Grande competed at the World Olympic Qualification Tournament held in Paris, France hoping to qualify for the 2020 Summer Olympics in Tokyo, Japan. She was eliminated in her first match by Lynn Snel of the Netherlands. As a result, she did not qualify at this tournament but she was able to qualify via continental representation soon after. Grande competed in the women's 61 kg event. She was also the flag bearer for Peru during the closing ceremony. In November 2021, Grande won one of the bronze medals in the women's 61 kg event at the World Karate Championships held in Dubai, United Arab Emirates. In her bronze medal match she defeated Ingrida Suchánková of Slovakia.

Grande won the silver medal in the women's 61 kg event at the 2022 World Games held in Birmingham, United States. In the final, she faced the same opponent as in her final match at the 2017 World Games.

Grande won the gold medal in her event at the 2022 South American Games held in Asunción, Paraguay. She defeated Claudymar Garcés of Venezuela in her gold medal match. In 2023, Grande competed in the women's 61 kg event at the World Karate Championships held in Budapest, Hungary where she was eliminated in her fourth match. A week later, Grande won the silver medal in her event at the 2023 Pan American Games held in Santiago, Chile.

== Achievements ==
Year	Competition	Venue	Rank	Event
2010	South American Games	Medellín, Colombia	1st	Kumite 61 kg
2010	South American Games	Medellín, Colombia	3rd	Open
2010	World Combat Games	Beijing, China	3rd	Kumite 61 kg
2011	Pan American Games	Guadalajara, Mexico	2nd	Kumite 61 kg
2013	Bolivarian Games	Trujillo, Peru	2nd	Team kumite
2015	Pan American Games	Toronto, Canada	1st	Kumite 61 kg
2017	World Games	Wrocław, Poland	1st	Kumite 61 kg
2018	South American Games	Cochabamba, Bolivia	2nd	Kumite 61 kg
2019	Pan American Games	Lima, Peru	1st	Kumite 61 kg
2021	World Championships	Dubai, United Arab Emirates	3rd	Kumite 61 kg
2022	World Games	Birmingham, United States	2nd	Kumite 61 kg
2022	South American Games	Asunción, Paraguay	1st	Kumite 61 kg
2023	Pan American Games	Santiago, Chile	2nd	Kumite 61 kg
