= Rodrigo Rojas (karateka) =

Chilean karateka (born 1990)

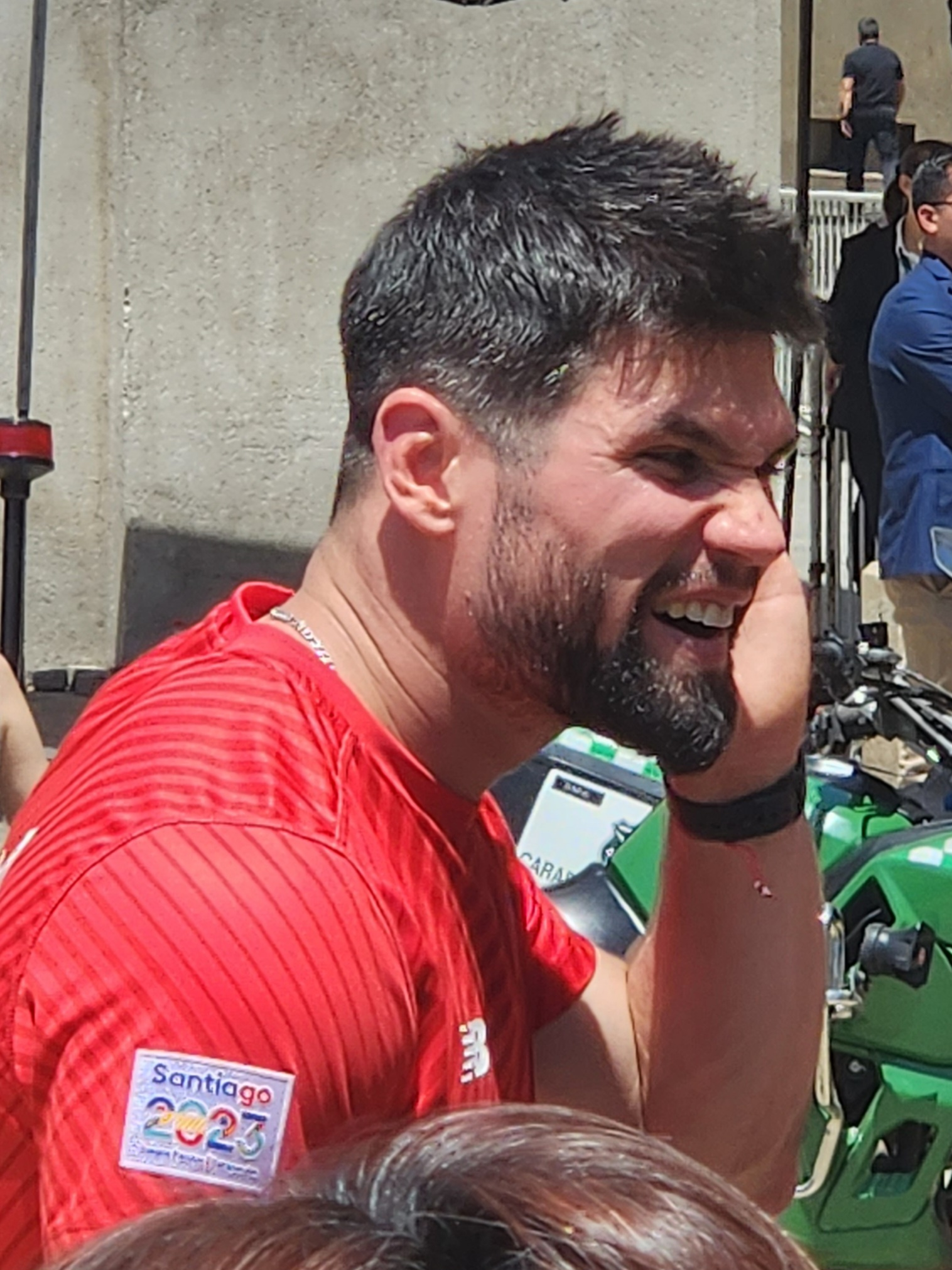
- Rojas in 2023

Personal information
- Born: Rodrigo Rojas Macchiavello; 11 June 1990 (age 36) Santiago, Chile

Sport
- Country: Chile
- Sport: Karate
- Weight class: +84 kg
- Event: Kumite
- Now coaching: Ahmed Solyman
Medal record
Men's karate
Representing Chile
Pan American Games
Gold medal – first place	2023 Santiago	Kumite +84 kg
South American Games
Gold medal – first place	2022 Asunción	Kumite +84 kg
Bolivarian Games
Gold medal – first place	2022 Valledupar	Kumite +84 kg
Bronze medal – third place	2022 Valledupar	Team kumite

Rodrigo Rojas Macchiavello (born 11 June 1990) is a Chilean karateka. He won the gold medal in the men's +84 kg event at the 2023 Pan American Games, held in Santiago, Chile, after defeating Brazil's Lucas Miranda in the final.

== Personal life ==
Rojas began practicing karate at nine years old, after his father, who was also a karateka, suggested the sport to him. He studied at Colegio Pumahue in Peñalolén, graduating in 2008. In 2016, he graduated with a degree in kinesiology from the Andrés Bello National University.

== Career ==
In 2017, he became the first non-Japanese karateka to win the World Championship, organized by the Japan Karate Association and held in Ireland.

At the 2019 Pan American Games, held in Lima, Peru, he won the bronze medal in the +84 kg event. He participated in the 2021 World Karate Championships, held in Dubai, United Arab Emirates, where he advanced until the second round.

During the 2022 Bolivarian Games, held in Valledupar, Colombia, Rojas was one of the flag bearers. Additionally, he won the gold medal in his category and the bronze medal in the men's team kumite event at the games. Also that year, he won the gold medal in his category at the 2022 South American Games, held in Asunción, Paraguay.

He participated in the 2025 World Karate Championships, held in Cairo, Egypt, where he advanced until the semifinals.
