= Andrea Armada =

Venezuelan karateka (born 2000)

Personal information
- Full name: Andrea Armada Ruiz
- Born: 12 January 2000 (age 26)

Sport
- Country: Venezuela
- Sport: Karate
- Event: Individual kata
Medal record
Women's karate
Representing Venezuela
Pan American Games
Bronze medal – third place	2019 Lima	Individual kata
Bronze medal – third place	2023 Santiago	Individual kata
Central American and Caribbean Games
Silver medal – second place	2018 Barranquilla	Individual kata
Bronze medal – third place	2023 San Salvador	Individual kata
South American Games
Silver medal – second place	2022 Asunción	Individual kata
Bolivarian Games
Bronze medal – third place	2022 Valledupar	Individual kata

Andrea Armada Ruiz (born 12 January 2000) is a Venezuelan karateka. She won one of the bronze medals in the women's individual kata event at the 2019 Pan American Games held in Lima, Peru. She also won this medal at the 2023 Pan American Games held in Santiago, Chile.

== Career ==
In 2018, Armada won the silver medal in the women's individual kata event at the Central American and Caribbean Games held in Barranquilla, Colombia.

In June 2021, Armada competed at the World Olympic Qualification Tournament held in Paris, France hoping to qualify for the 2020 Summer Olympics in Tokyo, Japan. In November 2021, she competed at the World Karate Championships held in Dubai, United Arab Emirates.

Armada won one of the bronze medals in the women's kata event at the 2022 Bolivarian Games held in Valledupar, Colombia. She won the silver medal in her event at the 2022 South American Games held in Asunción, Paraguay.

In 2023, she won one of the bronze medals in her event at the Pan American Games held in Santiago, Chile.

== Achievements ==
Year	Competition	Venue	Rank	Event
2018	Central American and Caribbean Games	Barranquilla, Colombia	2nd	Individual kata
2019	Pan American Games	Lima, Peru	3rd	Individual kata
2022	Bolivarian Games	Valledupar, Colombia	3rd	Individual kata
2022	South American Games	Asunción, Paraguay	2nd	Individual kata
2023	Central American and Caribbean Games	San Salvador, El Salvador	3rd	Individual kata
2023	Pan American Games	Santiago, Chile	3rd	Individual kata
