= Héctor Cención =

Panamanian karateka (born 1999)

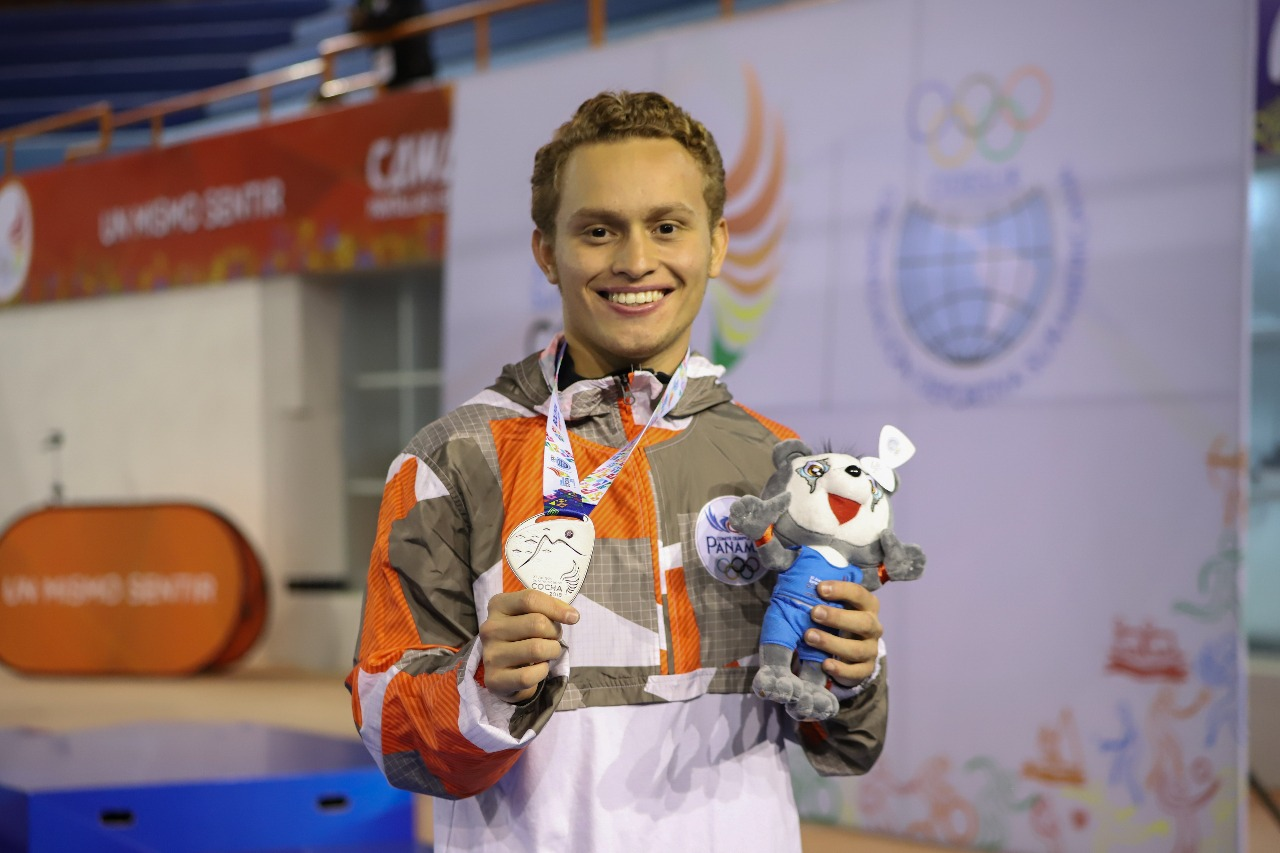

Personal information
- Full name: Héctor Jesus Cención Salazar
- National team: Panama, karate
- Citizenship: Panamanian
- Born: 2 April 1999 (age 27)
- Education: School Domingo Faustino Sarmiento and I.P.T Angel Rubio
- Occupation: Karateka
- Years active: 2016 – present

Sport
- Country: Panama
- Sport: Karate
- University team: University of Panama
- Coached by: Biagio Rodofile

Achievements and titles
- World finals: No. 1º in the U21 world ranking 2019
- Regional finals: 2 times Pan American Champion U21 / 6 time Central American champion / 2 time South American champion
- National finals: 3 times national champion
Medal record
Men's karate
Representing Panama
Pan American Games
Bronze medal – third place	2019 Lima	Individual kata
South American Games
Silver medal – second place	2018 Cochabamba	Individual kata
Bronze medal – third place	2022 Asunción	Individual kata
Bolivarian Games
Bronze medal – third place	2022 Valledupar	Individual kata

Héctor Cención (born 2 April 1999) is a Panamanian karateka. At the 2019 Pan American Games held in Lima, Peru, he won one of the bronze medals in the men's kata event.

In 2018, he won the silver medal in the men's kata event at the 2018 South American Games held in Cochabamba, Bolivia. In 2018, he also competed in the men's individual kata event at the 2018 World Karate Championships held in Madrid, Spain.

Héctor Cencion is three-time national champion and a six-time adult Central American champion. He is a five-time South American finalist, being 2 times South American champion and 3 times vice champion. He is a two-time U21 Pan American Champion and in 2019 he was No. 1 in the world ranking for under-21 karateka. he is currently among the top 50 adult athletes in the world, in the kata modality.

In 2019 he won the title of the best athlete of the year in PANAMA, the winner among all sports.

In June 2021, he competed at the World Olympic Qualification Tournament held in Paris, France hoping to qualify for the 2020 Summer Olympics in Tokyo, Japan. In November 2021, he competed at the 2021 World Karate Championships held in Dubai, United Arab Emirates.

He won one of the bronze medals in the men's kata event at the 2022 Bolivarian Games held in Valledupar, Colombia. He competed in the men's kata at the 2022 World Games held in Birmingham, United States. He won one of the bronze medals in his event at the 2022 South American Games held in Asunción, Paraguay.
