= Karate at the 2019 Pan American Games =

- Karate pictogram
- Venue: Polideportivo Villa El Salvador
- Dates: August 9–11, 2019
- Competitors: 132

Karate competitions at the 2019 Pan American Games in Lima, Peru were held between August 9 and 11, 2019 at the Polideportivo Villa El Salvador, which also hosted the gymnastics competitions.

14 medal events were contested. Ten of these events were in kumite (five per gender). A further four events (two per gender) in kata were contested, after the Panamsports added them to the sports program in March 2017. This marked the first time kata events were held at the Pan American Games since 2003 in Santo Domingo. A total of 132 athletes qualified to compete at the games.

The top three medallists (in order of gold, silver then bronze) not already qualified for the 2020 Summer Olympics according to the Olympic Standings as of April 6, 2020, qualified for the said games.

== Medal table ==
* Host nation (Peru)

Rank	Nation	Gold	Silver	Bronze	Total
1	United States	5	1	1	7
2	Dominican Republic	3	1	3	7
3	Venezuela	2	2	4	8
4	Peru*	2	0	4	6
5	Brazil	1	2	4	7
6	Chile	1	2	1	4
7	Mexico	0	4	2	6
8	Canada	0	2	0	2
9	Colombia	0	0	2	2
9	Guatemala	0	0	2	2
11	Argentina	0	0	1	1
11	Cuba	0	0	1	1
11	Panama	0	0	1	1
11	Uruguay	0	0	1	1
Totals (14 entries)		14	14	27	55

== Medallists ==
=== Men's events ===
Event	Gold	Silver	Bronze
Individual kata	Antonio Díaz; Venezuela	Ariel Torres Gutierrez; United States	Mariano Wong; Peru
Individual kata	Antonio Díaz; Venezuela	Ariel Torres Gutierrez; United States	Héctor Cención; Panama
Team kata	Peru; John Trebejo; Oliver del Castillo; Carlos Lam	Mexico; Waldo Ramírez; Diego Rosales; Jesús Leonardo Rodríguez	Brazil; Guilherme Silva; Lucas Santos; Victor Mota
Team kata	Peru; John Trebejo; Oliver del Castillo; Carlos Lam	Mexico; Waldo Ramírez; Diego Rosales; Jesús Leonardo Rodríguez	Argentina; Martín Juiz; Luca Impagnatiello; Sebastián González
60 kg	Joaquín González; Chile	Douglas Brose; Brazil	Maximiliano Larrosa; Uruguay
60 kg	Joaquín González; Chile	Douglas Brose; Brazil	Jovanni Martínez; Venezuela
67 kg	Andrés Madera; Venezuela	Camilo Velozo; Chile	Deivis Ferreras; Dominican Republic
67 kg	Andrés Madera; Venezuela	Camilo Velozo; Chile	Vinícius Figueira; Brazil
75 kg	Thomas Scott; United States	Hernani Veríssimo; Brazil	Allan Maldonado; Guatemala
75 kg	Thomas Scott; United States	Hernani Veríssimo; Brazil	Anderson Soriano; Dominican Republic
84 kg^{[a]}	Kamran Madani; United States	Alan Ever Cuevas; Mexico	Freddy Valera; Venezuela
+84 kg	Brian Irr; United States	Daniel Gaysinsky; Canada	Rodrigo Rojas; Chile
+84 kg	Brian Irr; United States	Daniel Gaysinsky; Canada	Diego Lenis; Colombia

- ^{Men's 84 kg} Carlos Sinisterra of Colombia originally won the gold medal, but he was disqualified for doping violations.

=== Women's events ===
Event	Gold	Silver	Bronze
Individual kata	Sakura Kokumai; United States	María Dimitrova; Dominican Republic	Andrea Armada; Venezuela
Individual kata	Sakura Kokumai; United States	María Dimitrova; Dominican Republic	Ingrid Aranda; Peru
Team kata	Dominican Republic; María Dimitrova; Franchel Velázquez; Sasha Rodríguez	Mexico; Cinthia de la Rúe; Pamela Contreras; Victoria Cruz	Brazil; Carolaini Pereira; Sabrina Pereira; Izabel Cardoso
Team kata	Dominican Republic; María Dimitrova; Franchel Velázquez; Sasha Rodríguez	Mexico; Cinthia de la Rúe; Pamela Contreras; Victoria Cruz	Peru; Saida Salcedo; Sol Romani; Rosa Almarza
50 kg	Shannon Nishi; United States	Alicia Hernández; Mexico	Cheili González; Guatemala
50 kg	Shannon Nishi; United States	Alicia Hernández; Mexico	Jéssica de Paula; Brazil
55 kg	Valéria Kumizaki; Brazil	Kathryn Campbell; Canada	Baurelys Torres; Cuba
55 kg	Valéria Kumizaki; Brazil	Kathryn Campbell; Canada	Paula Flores; Mexico
61 kg	Alexandra Grande; Peru	Claudymar Garcés; Venezuela	Karina Díaz; Dominican Republic
61 kg	Alexandra Grande; Peru	Claudymar Garcés; Venezuela	Xhunashi Caballero; Mexico
68 kg	Tanya Rodríguez; Dominican Republic	Susana Li; Chile	Wendy Mosquera; Colombia
68 kg	Tanya Rodríguez; Dominican Republic	Susana Li; Chile	Marianth Cuervo; Venezuela
+68 kg	Pamela Rodríguez; Dominican Republic	Omaira Molina; Venezuela	Cirrus Lingl; United States
+68 kg	Pamela Rodríguez; Dominican Republic	Omaira Molina; Venezuela	Isabel Aco; Peru

== Qualification ==
A total of 132 karatekas qualified to compete. Each nation entered a maximum of 18 athletes (nine per gender). There were eight athletes qualified in each individual event, along with six teams in the kata team events. This consisted of a maximum of one athlete in the individual events (12), and one group of three in each kata team event (six). The host nation, Peru, automatically qualified the maximum number of athletes (18). The rest of the spots were awarded across four qualification tournaments.

== See also ==
- Karate at the 2020 Summer Olympics
