= Tanya Rodríguez =

Dominican Republic karateka (born 2000)

Personal information
- Born: 7 June 2000 (age 26)

Sport
- Country: Dominican Republic
- Sport: Karate
- Weight class: 68 kg
- Events: Kumite; Team kumite
Medal record
Women's karate
Representing Dominican Republic
Pan American Games
Gold medal – first place	2019 Lima	Kumite -68 kg
Bolivarian Games
Bronze medal – third place	2022 Valledupar	Team kumite

Tanya Rodríguez (born 7 June 2000) is a Dominican Republic karateka. She won the gold medal in the women's kumite -68 kg event at the 2019 Pan American Games held in Lima, Peru.

She won one of the bronze medals in the women's team kumite event at the 2022 Bolivarian Games held in Valledupar, Colombia.

== Achievements ==
Year	Competition	Venue	Rank	Event
2019	Pan American Games	Lima, Peru	1st	Kumite 68 kg
2022	Bolivarian Games	Valledupar, Colombia	3rd	Team kumite
