= Shanee Torres =

Colombian karateka (born 1997)

Personal information
- Born: Shanee Torres Doncel; 5 December 1997 (age 28)

Sport
- Country: Colombia
- Sport: Karate
- Weight class: +68 kg
- Events: Kumite; Team kumite
Medal record
Representing Colombia
Women's karate
Event	1st	2nd	3rd
World Championships	0	0	1
Pan American Championships	0	2	2
CAC Games	0	0	2
South American Games	0	1	1
Bolivarian Games	0	1	2
Total	0	4	8
World Championships
Bronze medal – third place	2021 Dubai	Team kumite
Pan American Championships
Silver medal – second place	2018 Santiago	Kumite +68 kg
Silver medal – second place	2025 Monterrey	Kumite +68 kg
Bronze medal – third place	2019 Panama City	Kumite +68 kg
Bronze medal – third place	2023 San José	Kumite +68 kg
Central American and Caribbean Games
Bronze medal – third place	2018 Barranquilla	Kumite +68 kg
Bronze medal – third place	2023 San Salvador	Kumite +68 kg
South American Games
Silver medal – second place	2022 Asunción	Kumite +68 kg
Bronze medal – third place	2018 Cochabamba	Kumite +68 kg
Bolivarian Games
Silver medal – second place	2022 Valledupar	Kumite +68 kg
Bronze medal – third place	2017 Santa Marta	Kumite +68 kg
Bronze medal – third place	2017 Santa Marta	Team kumite

Shanee Torres Doncel (born 5 December 1997) is a Colombian karateka.

In 2021, Torres competed in the women's +68 kg event at the World Karate Championships held in Dubai, United Arab Emirates. She won one of the bronze medals in the women's team kumite event.

Torres won the silver medal in the women's +68 kg event at the 2022 Bolivarian Games held in Valledupar, Colombia. Several months later, she also won the silver medal in same event at the 2022 South American Games held in Asunción, Paraguay.

== Achievements ==
Year	Competition	Venue	Rank	Event
Representing Colombia
2017	Bolivarian Games	Santa Marta, Colombia	3rd	Kumite +68 kg
2017	Bolivarian Games	Santa Marta, Colombia	3rd	Team kumite
2018	South American Games	Cochabamba, Bolivia	3rd	Kumite +68 kg
2018	Pan American Championships	Santiago, Chile	2nd	Kumite +68 kg
2018	Central American and Caribbean Games	Barranquilla, Colombia	3rd	Kumite +68 kg
2019	Pan American Championships	Panama City, Panama	3rd	Kumite +68 kg
2021	World Championships	Dubai, United Arab Emirates	3rd	Team kumite
2022	Bolivarian Games	Valledupar, Colombia	2nd	Kumite +68 kg
2022	South American Games	Asunción, Paraguay	2nd	Kumite +68 kg
2023	Pan American Championships	San José, Costa Rica	3rd	Kumite +68 kg
2023	Central American and Caribbean Games	San Salvador, El Salvador	3rd	Kumite +68 kg
2025	Pan American Championships	Monterrey, Mexico	2nd	Kumite +68 kg
