= Lucas Miranda =

Brazilian footballer (1921–2006)

Personal information
- Date of birth: 10 August 1921
- Place of birth: Curitiba, Brazil
- Date of death: 4 December 2006 (aged 85)
- Place of death: Belo Horizonte, Brazil
- Position: Forward

Senior career*
Years	Team	Apps	(Gls)
1942	Botafogo		
1943	Corinthians		
1944–1954	Atlético Mineiro	258	(152)
- * Club domestic league appearances and goals

Lucas Miranda (10 August 1921 – 4 December 2006) was a Brazilian professional footballer who played as a forward.

== Career ==
Born in Curitiba and with brief spells at Botafogo and Corinthians, Lucas Miranda made history at Atlético Mineiro, where he played 258 matches and scored 152 goals, being state champion on six occasions and top scorer in 1951.

== Honours ==
Atlético Mineiro

- Campeonato Mineiro: 1946, 1947, 1949, 1950, 1952, 1953

Individual

- 1951 Campeonato Mineiro top scorer: 16 goals
