= Douglas Brose =

Brazilian karateka (born 1985)

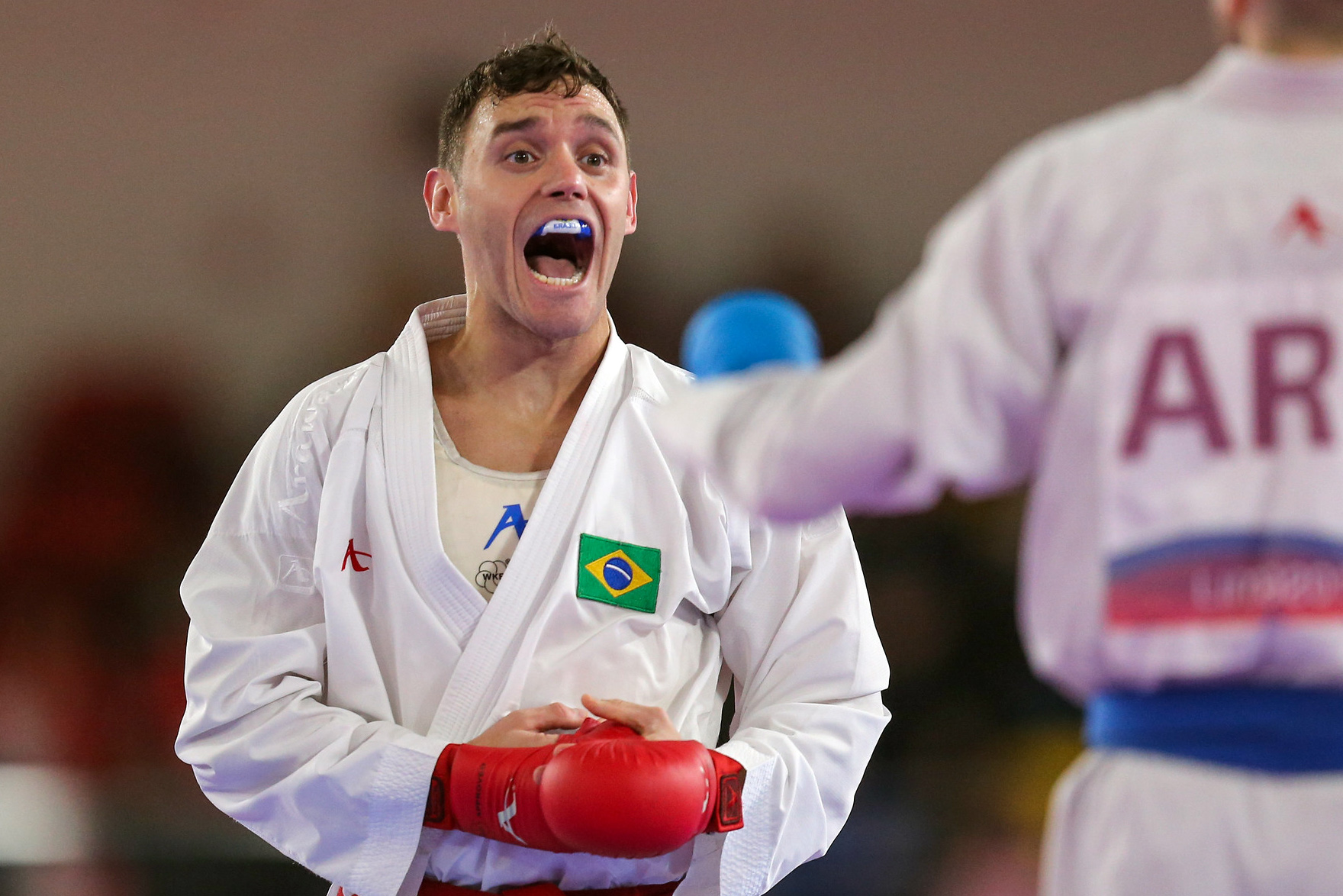
- Brose in 2019

Personal information
- Born: 11 December 1985 (age 40)

Sport
- Country: Brazil
- Sport: Karate
- Weight class: 60 kg
- Event: Kumite
Medal record
Men's karate
Representing Brazil
World Championships
Gold medal – first place	2010 Belgrade	Kumite 60 kg
Gold medal – first place	2014 Bremen	Kumite 60 kg
Gold medal – first place	2021 Dubai	Kumite 60 kg
Silver medal – second place	2012 Paris	Kumite 60 kg
Bronze medal – third place	2008 Tokyo	Kumite 60 kg
World Games
Gold medal – first place	2009 Kaohsiung	Kumite 60 kg
Silver medal – second place	2013 Cali	Kumite 60 kg
Silver medal – second place	2022 Birmingham	Kumite 60 kg
World Combat Games
Bronze medal – third place	2013 St. Petersburg	Kumite 60 kg
Pan American Games
Gold medal – first place	2015 Toronto	Kumite 60 kg
Silver medal – second place	2019 Lima	Kumite 60 kg
Bronze medal – third place	2007 Rio de Janeiro	Kumite 60 kg
Bronze medal – third place	2011 Guadalajara	Kumite 60 kg
Bronze medal – third place	2023 Santiago	Kumite 60 kg
Pan American Championship
Gold medal – first place	2011 Guadalajara	Kumite 60 kg
Gold medal – first place	2014 Lima	Kumite 60 kg
Gold medal – first place	2015 Toronto	Kumite 60 kg
Gold medal – first place	2016 Rio	Kumite 60 kg
Gold medal – first place	2017 Curaçao	Kumite 60 kg
Gold medal – first place	2019 Panamá	Kumite 60 kg
Gold medal – first place	2021 Punta del Este	Kumite 60 kg
Gold medal – first place	2022 Curaçao	Kumite 60 kg
Bronze medal – third place	2023 Costa Rica	Kumite 60 kg
South American Games
Gold medal – first place	2010 Medellín	Team kumite
Gold medal – first place	2014 Santiago	Kumite 60 kg
Gold medal – first place	2022 Asunción	Kumite 60 kg
Silver medal – second place	2006 B.Aires	Team kumite
Bronze medal – third place	2006 B.Aires	Kumite 60 kg

Douglas Santos Brose (born 11 December 1985) is a Brazilian karateka. He is a three-time gold medalist in the men's kumite 60 kg event at the World Karate Championships. He also won the gold medal in the 2009 World Games, the 2015 Pan American Games, as well as being an eight-time Pan American Karate Championships champion.

== Career ==
Bloodsport, Fist of Fury and The Way of the Dragon were some of the films that inspired Douglas Brose to learn about and train some martial art. At eight years old, he chose karate.

His first important medal was obtained at the 2007 Pan American Games, when he won a bronze medal. At this time, he was also two-time South American champion and three-time Brazilian champion.

At the 2008 World Karate Championships he won his first medal in World Championships, a bronze.

At the 2009 World Games held in Taiwan, Brose won the gold medal, his best performance in the history of the competition.

At the 2010 World Karate Championships held in Belgrade, Serbia, he won gold for the first time, becoming world champion.

At the 2011 Pan American Games, he won again a bronze medal.

In 2012 he won his third World Championship medal, now a silver, at the 2012 World Karate Championships.

At the 2013 World Games held in Cali, Colombia, he won the silver medal in the men's kumite 60 kg event.

At the 2013 World Combat Games held in Russia, Brose won a bronze medal.

Brose became two-time world champion at the 2014 World Karate Championships in Bremen.

At the 2015 Pan American Games, Brose won gold in karate, his best performance in Pan American Games history.

At the 2019 Pan American Games, Brose won a silver medal.

Brose won the gold medal in the men's kumite 60 kg event at the 2021 World Karate Championships held in Dubai, United Arab Emirates. With this, he became three-time world champion. It was Brose's fifth world championship medal. The Brazilian won gold in 2010 and 2014, silver in 2012 and bronze in 2008.

Brose obtained his seventh title at the Pan American Karate Championships in 2021, in Punta del Este. Before that, he had already been champion in Guadalajara 2011, Lima 2014, Toronto 2015, Rio 2016, Curaçao 2017 and Panama 2019.

Brose obtained his eighth title at the Pan American Karate Championships in 2022, in Curaçao.

Brose won the silver medal in the men's kumite 60 kg event at the 2022 World Games held in Birmingham, United States. It was his third medal in the history of the competition, ending his career with 1 gold and 2 silvers.

At 37 years old, he competed in the last fights of his career at the 2023 Pan American Games in Santiago and said goodbye after winning the bronze medal. It was his fifth Pans medal: he obtained gold in Toronto-2015, silver in Lima-2019 and bronze in Rio-2007 and Guadalajara-2011.
