= Wendy Mosquera =

Colombian karateka (born 1995)

Personal information
- Full name: Wendy Mary Ann Mosquera
- Born: 11 February 1995 (age 31)

Sport
- Country: Colombia
- Sport: Karate
- Weight class: +61 kg; 68 kg
- Events: Kumite; Team kumite
Medal record
Representing Colombia
Women's karate
Event	1st	2nd	3rd
World Championships	0	0	1
Pan American Games	0	1	1
Pan American Championships	0	1	2
CAC Games	0	2	0
South American Games	0	1	0
Bolivarian Games	2	1	0
Total	2	6	4
World Championships
Bronze medal – third place	2021 Dubai	Team kumite
Pan American Games
Silver medal – second place	2023 Santiago	Kumite 68 kg
Bronze medal – third place	2019 Lima	Kumite 68 kg
Pan American Championships
Silver medal – second place	2023 San José	Kumite 68 kg
Bronze medal – third place	2024 Punta del Este	Kumite 68 kg
Bronze medal – third place	2026 Rio de Janeiro	Kumite 68 kg
Central American and Caribbean Games
Silver medal – second place	2023 San Salvador	Kumite 68 kg
Silver medal – second place	2026 Santo Domingo	Kumite 68 kg
South American Games
Silver medal – second place	2022 Asunción	Kumite 68 kg
Bolivarian Games
Gold medal – first place	2022 Valledupar	Kumite 68 kg
Gold medal – first place	2025 Lima-Ayacucho	Kumite 68 kg
Silver medal – second place	2025 Lima-Ayacucho	Team kumite

Wendy Mary Ann Mosquera (born 11 February 1995) is a Colombian karateka. She won the silver medal in the women's kumite 68 kg event at the 2023 Pan American Games held in Santiago, Chile. She won one of the bronze medals in her event at the 2019 Pan American Games held in Lima, Peru.

== Career ==
In 2021, Mosquera competed in the women's 68 kg event at the World Karate Championships held in Dubai, United Arab Emirates. She was eliminated in her first match. She won one of the bronze medals in the women's team kumite event.

Mosquera won the gold medal in the women's 68 kg event at the 2022 Bolivarian Games held in Valledupar, Colombia. A few months later, she won the silver medal in her event at the 2022 South American Games held in Asunción, Paraguay.

She won the silver medal in her event at the 2023 Central American and Caribbean Games held in San Salvador, El Salvador. She also won the silver medal in her event at the 2023 Pan American Games held in Santiago, Chile.

== Achievements ==
Year	Competition	Venue	Rank	Event
Representing Colombia
2019	Pan American Games	Lima, Peru	3rd	Kumite 68 kg
2021	World Championships	Dubai, United Arab Emirates	3rd	Team kumite
2022	Bolivarian Games	Valledupar, Colombia	1st	Kumite 68 kg
2022	South American Games	Asunción, Paraguay	2nd	Kumite 68 kg
2023	Pan American Championships	San José, Costa Rica	2nd	Kumite 68 kg
2023	Central American and Caribbean Games	San Salvador, El Salvador	2nd	Kumite 68 kg
2023	Pan American Games	Santiago, Chile	2nd	Kumite 68 kg
2024	Pan American Championships	Punta del Este, Uruguay	3rd	Kumite 68 kg
2025	Bolivarian Games	Ayacucho, Peru	1st	Kumite 68 kg
2025	Bolivarian Games	Ayacucho, Peru	2nd	Team kumite
2026	Pan American Championships	Rio de Janeiro, Brazil	3rd	Kumite 68 kg
2026	Central American and Caribbean Games	Santo Domingo, Dominican Republic	2nd	Kumite 68 kg
