= Diana Ramírez =

Colombian karateka

Personal information
- Full name: Diana Patricia Ramírez Gutiérrez
- Born: 5 January 1990 (age 36)

Sport
- Country: Colombia
- Sport: Karate
- Weight class: 61 kg
- Events: Kumite; Team kumite
Medal record
Representing Colombia
Women's karate
Event	1st	2nd	3rd
World Championships	0	0	1
Bolivarian Games	0	0	1
Total	0	0	2
World Championships
Bronze medal – third place	2021 Dubai	Team kumite
Bolivarian Games
Bronze medal – third place	2022 Valledupar	Kumite 61 kg

Diana Patricia Ramírez Gutiérrez (born 5 January 1990) is a Colombian karateka.

In 2021, Ramírez competed in the World Karate Championships held in Dubai, United Arab Emirates. She won one of the bronze medals in the women's team kumite event.

Ramírez won the bronze medal in the women's -61 kg event at the 2022 Bolivarian Games held in Valledupar, Colombia.

== Achievements ==
Year	Competition	Venue	Rank	Event
Representing Colombia
2021	World Championships	Dubai, United Arab Emirates	3rd	Team kumite
2022	Bolivarian Games	Valledupar, Colombia	3rd	Kumite 61 kg
