= Freddy Valera =

Venezuelan karateka

Sport
- Country: Venezuela
- Sport: Karate
- Weight class: 84 kg
- Event: Kumite
Medal record
Men's karate
Representing Venezuela
Pan American Games
Bronze medal – third place	2019 Lima	Kumite 84 kg
Central American and Caribbean Games
Silver medal – second place	2018 Barranquilla	Kumite 84 kg
South American Games
Bronze medal – third place	2022 Asunción	Kumite 84 kg
Pan American Karate Championships
Bronze medal – third place	2018 Santiago	Kumite 84 kg

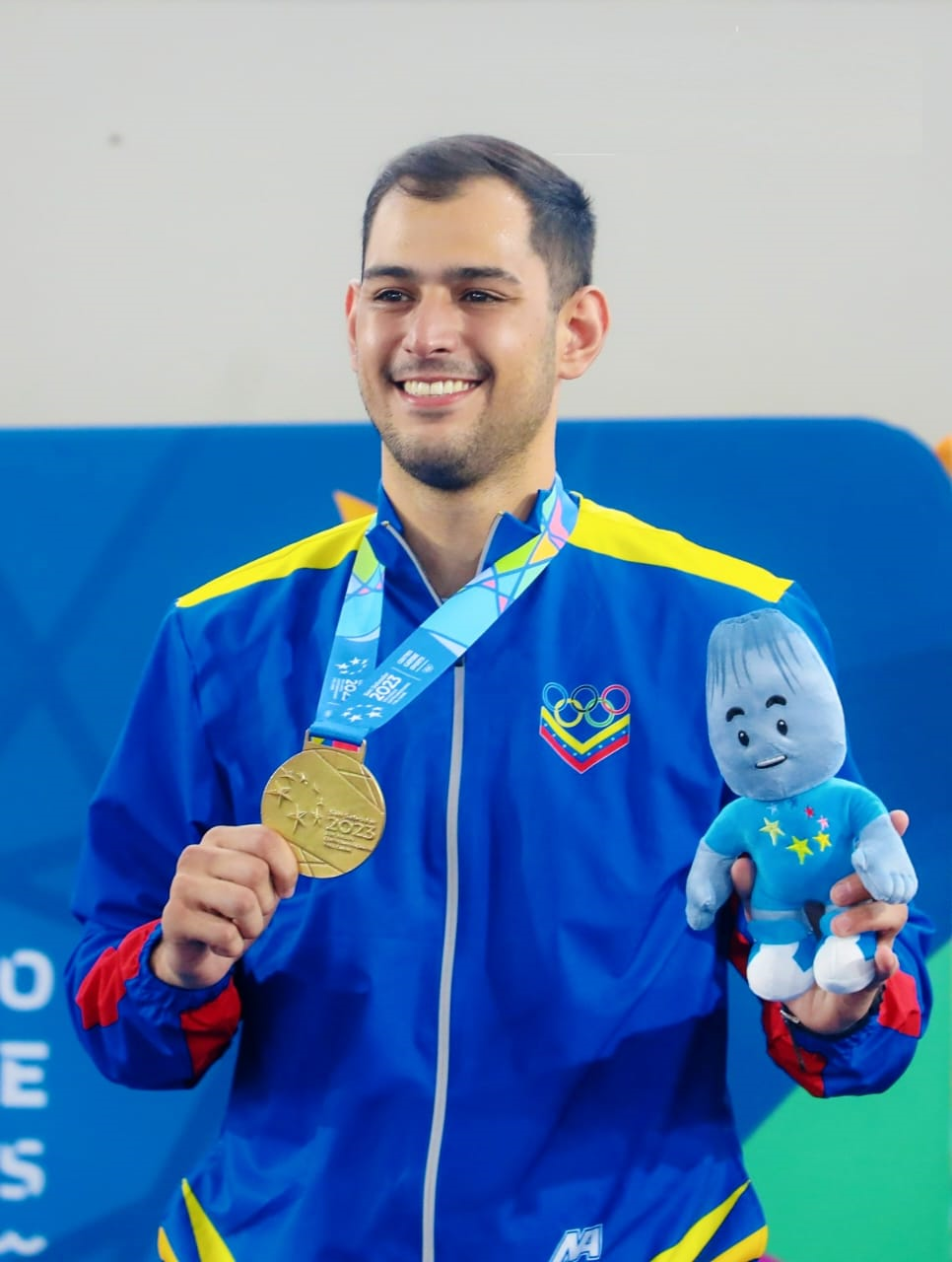

Freddy Valera is a Venezuelan karateka. He won Gold Medal in the Men's Individual -84 Kg Kumite XXIV Juegos Centroamericanos y del Caribe San Salvador 2023.

== Career ==
At the 2019 Pan American Games held in Lima, Peru, he won one of the bronze medals in the men's kumite 84 kg event.

At the 2018 Pan American Karate Championships, he won one of the bronze medals in the men's kumite 84 kg event.

In June 2021, Valera competed at the World Olympic Qualification Tournament held in Paris, France hoping to qualify for the 2020 Summer Olympics in Tokyo, Japan. In November 2021, he competed in the men's 84 kg event at the World Karate Championships held in Dubai, United Arab Emirates.

Valera won one of the bronze medals in his event at the 2022 South American Games held in Asunción, Paraguay.
