= Susana Li =

Chilean karateka (born 1996)

Personal information
- Full name: Susana Li Zhang
- Born: 20 May 1996 (age 30)

Sport
- Country: Chile
- Sport: Karate
- Weight class: 68 kg
- Event: Kumite
Medal record
Women's karate
Representing Chile
Pan American Games
Silver medal – second place	2019 Lima	Kumite -68 kg
South American Games
Silver medal – second place	2018 Cochabamba	Kumite -68 kg

Susana Li Zhang (born 20 May 1996) is a Chilean karateka. She won the silver medal in the women's kumite -68 kg event at the 2019 Pan American Games held in Lima, Peru.

== Achievements ==
Year	Competition	Venue	Rank	Event
2018	South American Games	Cochabamba, Bolivia	2nd	Kumite 68 kg
2019	Pan American Games	Lima, Peru	2nd	Kumite 68 kg
