= Claudymar Garcés =

Venezuelan karateka (born 1998)

Personal information
- Full name: Claudymar Antonia Garcés Sequera
- Born: 2 October 1998 (age 27)

Sport
- Country: Venezuela
- Sport: Karate
- Weight class: 61 kg
- Events: Kumite; Team kumite
Medal record
Women's karate
Representing Venezuela
Pan American Games
Silver medal – second place	2019 Lima	Kumite 61 kg
Bronze medal – third place	2023 Santiago	Kumite 61 kg
Central American and Caribbean Games
Gold medal – first place	2018 Barranquilla	Kumite 61 kg
Bronze medal – third place	2023 San Salvador	Kumite 61 kg
South American Games
Silver medal – second place	2022 Asunción	Kumite 61 kg
Bolivarian Games
Gold medal – first place	2025 Lima-Ayacucho	Kumite 61 kg
Gold medal – first place	2025 Lima-Ayacucho	Team kumite
Silver medal – second place	2022 Valledupar	Kumite 61 kg
Silver medal – second place	2022 Valledupar	Team kumite

Claudymar Antonia Garcés Sequera (Note: In this Spanish name, the first or paternal surname is Garcés and the second or maternal family name is Sequera.) (born 2 October 1998) is a Venezuelan karateka. She won the silver medal in the women's kumite 61 kg event at the 2019 Pan American Games held in Lima, Peru.

She represented Venezuela at the 2020 Summer Olympics in Tokyo, Japan. She competed in the women's 61 kg event.

== Career ==
In 2018, Garcés won the gold medal in the women's kumite 61 kg event at the Central American and Caribbean Games held in Barranquilla, Colombia.

In 2021, Garcés qualified at the World Olympic Qualification Tournament held in Paris, France to compete at the 2020 Summer Olympics in Tokyo, Japan. She finished in third place in her pool during the pool stage in the women's 61 kg event and she did not advance to compete in the semifinals.

She won the silver medal in the women's 61 kg event at the 2022 Bolivarian Games held in Valledupar, Colombia. She also won the silver medal in her event at the 2022 South American Games held in Asunción, Paraguay.

In 2023, Garcés won one of the bronze medals in her event at the 2023 Central American and Caribbean Games held in San Salvador, El Salvador. In the same year, she competed in the women's 61 kg event at the World Karate Championships held in Budapest, Hungary. She was eliminated in her first match. A week later, Garcés won one of the bronze medals in her event at the 2023 Pan American Games held in Santiago, Chile.

== Achievements ==
Year	Competition	Venue	Rank	Event
2018	Central American and Caribbean Games	Barranquilla, Colombia	1st	Kumite 61 kg
2019	Pan American Games	Lima, Peru	2nd	Kumite 61 kg
2022	Bolivarian Games	Valledupar, Colombia	2nd	Kumite 61 kg
2022	Bolivarian Games	Valledupar, Colombia	2nd	Team kumite
2022	South American Games	Asunción, Paraguay	2nd	Kumite 61 kg
2023	Central American and Caribbean Games	San Salvador, El Salvador	3rd	Kumite 61 kg
2023	Pan American Games	Santiago, Chile	3rd	Kumite 61 kg
