= Andrés Madera =

Venezuelan karateka (born 1988)

Personal information
- Full name: Andrés Eduardo Madera Delgado
- Born: 6 June 1988 (age 38)

Sport
- Country: Venezuela
- Sport: Karate
Medal record
Men's karate
Representing Venezuela
Pan American Games
Gold medal – first place	2023 Santiago	67 kg

Andrés Eduardo Madera Delgado (Note: In this Spanish name, the first or paternal surname is Madera and the second or maternal family name is Delgado.) (born 6 June 1988) is a Venezuelan karateka. He won Gold Medal in the Men's Individual -67 Kg Kumite at the 2019 XVIII Pan American Games Karate at Lima, Peru.

== Career ==
Previously, Madera won a bronze medal in the Men's Individual -67 Kg Kumite at the 2016 Senior World Karate Championships at Linz, Austria and he won several medals, including gold, silver and bronze medals in the Pan American Games, Pan American championship, South American championship, Central American and Caribbean Games and American Centre Championships. He also won several medals in the World Karate Federation Karate1 Premier League and Series A Championships, and he was the 2017 GRAND WINNER of the Male Kumite -67 kg category.

== Achievements ==
He qualified for the 2020 Summer Olympics in Tokyo, Japan through the Continental Representation qualifying spots, where karate will be featured for the first time and now he will represent Venezuela Team at the 2020 Summer Olympics at the Karate competition of the 2020 Summer Olympics in Tokyo, Japan

Competition Results
YEAR	COMPETITION	VENUE	RANK/POSITION	EVENT
2020	2020 KARATE1 SERIES A	Santiago Chile	5th	Individual -67 Kg Kumite
2019	2019 XVIII Pan American Games	Lima Peru	Gold	Individual -67 Kg Kumite
2019	Karate1 Premier League	Shanghai China	Gold	Individual -67 Kg Kumite
2017	XXXI Adults Pan American Karate Championship	Curacao Curaçao	Silver	Individual -67 Kg Kumite
2017	Karate1 Premier League	Rotterdam Netherlands	Silver	Individual -67 Kg Kumite
2017	Karate1 Premier League	Paris France	Gold	Individual -67 Kg Kumite
2017	Karate1 Premier League	Rotterdam Netherlands	Silver	Individual -67 Kg Kumite
2016	Senior World Karate Championship	Linz Austria	Bronze	Individual -67 Kg Kumite
2016	XXX ADULTS PAN AMERICAN KARATE CHAMPIONSHIP	Rio Brazil	Silver	Individual -67 Kg Kumite
2015	XXIX PAN AMERICAN ADULT KARATE CHAMPIONSHIP	Toronto Canada	Gold	Individual -67 Kg Kumite
2014	Central American and Caribbean Games	Veracruz Mexico	Silver	Individual -67 Kg Kumite
2014	Karate1 Premier League	Paris France	Silver	Individual -67 Kg Kumite
2013	Karate1 Premier League	Hanau Germany	Silver	Individual -67 Kg Kumite
2012	Karate1 Premier League	Hanau Germany	Silver	Individual -67 Kg Kumite
