= Karate at the 2023 Pan American Games =

- Karate pictogram
- Venue: Polideportivo Villa El Salvador
- Start date: November 3, 2023
- End date: November 5, 2023
- No. of events: 12 (6 men, 6 women)
- Competitors: 106 from TBD nations

Karate competitions at the 2023 Pan American Games in Santiago, Chile were held between November 3 and 5, 2023 at the Centro de Entrenamiento de los Deportes de Contacto.

12 medal events were contested. Ten of these events were in kumite (five per gender). A further two events (one per gender) in kata were contested. A total of 106 athletes qualified to compete at the games.

== Qualification ==
A total of 106 karatekas will qualify to compete (96 qualified across four qualification tournaments and 10 extra nominal spots to the winners of the 2021 Junior Pan American Games. There will be nine athletes qualified in each individual event, excepting individual kata, which will feature eight athletes. Each nation may enter a maximum of 12 athletes (six per gender). This consists of a maximum of one athlete in the individual events (12). This rule does not apply to the winners of the 2021 Junior Pan American Games. The host nation, Chile, automatically qualifies the maximum number of athletes (12).

Venezuela, Panama and Colombia's athletes will be eligible to qualify through the 2023 Central American and Caribbean Championship, while Mexico will qualify through the North American Cup.

== Participating nations ==
A total of 21 countries qualified athletes.

- Argentina (6)
- Aruba (1)
- Bolivia (1)
- Brazil (11)
- Canada (6)
- Chile (13)
- Colombia (10)
- Cuba (3)
- Dominican Republic (5)
- Ecuador (4)
- El Salvador (2)
- Independent Athletes Team (5)
- Mexico (8)
- Nicaragua (1)
- Panama (1)
- Paraguay (2)
- Peru (4)
- Puerto Rico (2)
- United States (13)
- Uruguay (2)
- Venezuela (6)

== Medal summary ==
=== Medal table ===
* Host nation (Chile)

Rank	Nation	Gold	Silver	Bronze	Total
1	Chile*	3	1	1	5
2	United States	3	0	2	5
3	Venezuela	2	1	2	5
4	Brazil	1	1	4	6
5	Ecuador	1	1	0	2
5	Mexico	1	1	0	2
7	Puerto Rico	1	0	0	1
8	Colombia	0	3	3	6
9	Cuba	0	2	0	2
10	Canada	0	1	2	3
11	Peru	0	1	0	1
12	Independent Athletes Team	0	0	3	3
13	Argentina	0	0	2	2
13	Dominican Republic	0	0	2	2
15	Aruba	0	0	1	1
15	El Salvador	0	0	1	1
15	Panama	0	0	1	1
Totals (17 entries)		12	12	24	48

=== Medallists ===
Men's events

Event	Gold	Silver	Bronze
Individual kata	Ariel Torres; United States	Cleiver Leocadio; Venezuela	Luca Impagnatiello; Argentina
Individual kata	Ariel Torres; United States	Cleiver Leocadio; Venezuela	Larry Aracena; Dominican Republic
60 kg	Enrique Villalón; Chile	Brayan Díaz; Cuba	Douglas Brose; Brazil
60 kg	Enrique Villalón; Chile	Brayan Díaz; Cuba	Juan Fernández; Colombia
67 kg	Andrés Madera; Venezuela	Tomás Freire; Chile	Camilo Velozo; Chile
67 kg	Andrés Madera; Venezuela	Tomás Freire; Chile	Alberto Gálvez; Panama
75 kg	Thomas Scott; United States	Carlos Villarreal; Mexico	Allan Maldonado; Independent Athletes Team
75 kg	Thomas Scott; United States	Carlos Villarreal; Mexico	Juan Landázuri; Colombia
84 kg	José Acevedo; Ecuador	Rubén Henao; Colombia	Saisheren Senpon; United States
84 kg	José Acevedo; Ecuador	Rubén Henao; Colombia	Jorge Merino; El Salvador
+84 kg	Rodrigo Rojas; Chile	Lucas Miranda; Brazil	Rob Timmermans; Aruba
+84 kg	Rodrigo Rojas; Chile	Lucas Miranda; Brazil	Giovani Salgado; Brazil

Women's events

Event	Gold	Silver	Bronze
Individual kata	Sakura Kokumai; United States	Valentina Zapata; Colombia	Claudia Laos-Loo; Canada
Individual kata	Sakura Kokumai; United States	Valentina Zapata; Colombia	Andrea Armada; Venezuela
50 kg	Yorgelis Salazar; Venezuela	Yamina Lahyanssa; Canada	Bárbara Morales; Independent Athletes Team
50 kg	Yorgelis Salazar; Venezuela	Yamina Lahyanssa; Canada	Yamila Benítez; Argentina
55 kg	Valentina Toro; Chile	Baurelys Torres; Cuba	Kelly Fernandes; Brazil
55 kg	Valentina Toro; Chile	Baurelys Torres; Cuba	Geraldine Peña; Colombia
61 kg	Janessa Fonseca; Puerto Rico	Alexandra Grande; Peru	Claudymar Garcés; Venezuela
61 kg	Janessa Fonseca; Puerto Rico	Alexandra Grande; Peru	María Renée Wong; Independent Athletes Team
68 kg	Bárbara Rodrigues; Brazil	Wendy Mosquera; Colombia	Melissa Bratic; Canada
68 kg	Bárbara Rodrigues; Brazil	Wendy Mosquera; Colombia	Skylar Lingl; United States
+68 kg	Guadalupe Quintal; Mexico	Valeria Echever; Ecuador	Pamela Rodríguez; Dominican Republic
+68 kg	Guadalupe Quintal; Mexico	Valeria Echever; Ecuador	Brenda Padilha; Brazil
