= Karate at the Pan American Games =

- No. of events: 14 (men: 7; women: 7)

Karate has been a part of the Pan American Games since the 1995 Pan American Games in Mar del Plata, Argentina. There were eleven events, for both men (seven) and women (four), in this inaugural Pan Am event.

== Medal table ==
Updated after the 2023 Pan American Games.

| Rank | Nation | Gold | Silver | Bronze | Total |
|---|---|---|---|---|---|
| 1 | United States | 17 | 6 | 14 | 37 |
| 2 | Venezuela | 13 | 11 | 16 | 40 |
| 3 | Brazil | 11 | 13 | 25 | 49 |
| 4 | Dominican Republic | 10 | 9 | 9 | 28 |
| 5 | Cuba | 7 | 6 | 11 | 24 |
| 6 | Chile | 5 | 5 | 10 | 20 |
| 7 | Argentina | 5 | 3 | 9 | 17 |
| 8 | Peru | 4 | 7 | 12 | 23 |
| 9 | Ecuador | 4 | 1 | 6 | 11 |
| 10 | Mexico | 2 | 11 | 12 | 25 |
| 11 | Canada | 2 | 7 | 12 | 21 |
| 12 | Netherlands Antilles | 2 | 0 | 6 | 8 |
| 13 | Guatemala | 2 | 0 | 4 | 6 |
| 14 | Colombia | 1 | 6 | 8 | 15 |
| 15 | Puerto Rico | 1 | 0 | 2 | 3 |
| 16 | El Salvador | 0 | 1 | 3 | 4 |
| 17 | Independent Athletes Team | 0 | 0 | 3 | 3 |
| 18 | Panama | 0 | 0 | 2 | 2 |
| 18 | Paraguay | 0 | 0 | 2 | 2 |
| 18 | Uruguay | 0 | 0 | 2 | 2 |
| 21 | Aruba | 0 | 0 | 1 | 1 |
| Totals (21 entries) | | 86 | 86 | 169 | 341 |
