= 2021 World Karate Championships =

Karate event in Dubai, United Arab Emirates

2021 World Championships
- Venue: Hamdan Sports Complex
- Location: Dubai, United Arab Emirates
- Dates: 16−21 November

The 2021 World Karate Championships were held from 16 to 21 November 2021 in Dubai, United Arab Emirates.

== Medal table ==
* Host nation (United Arab Emirates)

Rank	Nation	Gold	Silver	Bronze	Total
1	Japan	4	1	2	7
2	Egypt	3	2	3	8
3	Spain	2	3	0	5
4	Italy	1	3	5	9
5	France	1	1	2	4
6	Serbia	1	1	0	2
7	Azerbaijan	1	0	2	3
8	Brazil	1	0	0	1
8	Georgia	1	0	0	1
8	Uzbekistan	1	0	0	1
11	Ukraine	0	1	2	3
12	United States	0	1	1	2
13	Chile	0	1	0	1
13	Germany	0	1	0	1
13	North Macedonia	0	1	0	1
16	Kazakhstan	0	0	3	3
17	Croatia	0	0	2	2
17	RKF	0	0	2	2
17	Turkey	0	0	2	2
20	Bulgaria	0	0	1	1
20	Colombia	0	0	1	1
20	Hong Kong	0	0	1	1
20	Morocco	0	0	1	1
20	Netherlands	0	0	1	1
20	Peru	0	0	1	1
Totals (25 entries)		16	16	32	64

== Medalists ==
=== Men ===
Event	Gold	Silver	Bronze
Individual kata	Ryo Kiyuna; Japan	Damián Quintero; Spain	Mattia Busato; Italy
Individual kata	Ryo Kiyuna; Japan	Damián Quintero; Spain	Ali Sofuoğlu; Turkey
Team kata	Japan; Koji Arimoto; Kazumasa Moto; Ryuji Moto	Spain; Sergio Galán; Alejandro Manzana; Raúl Martín	Italy; Mattia Busato; Gianluca Gallo; Alessandro Iodice
Team kata	Japan; Koji Arimoto; Kazumasa Moto; Ryuji Moto	Spain; Sergio Galán; Alejandro Manzana; Raúl Martín	Turkey; Emre Vefa Göktaş; Enes Özdemir; Ali Sofuoğlu
Kumite −60 kg	Douglas Brose; Brazil	Angelo Crescenzo; Italy	Abdelali Jina; Morocco
Kumite −60 kg	Douglas Brose; Brazil	Angelo Crescenzo; Italy	Iurik Ogannisian; Russian Karate Federation
Kumite −67 kg	Steven Da Costa; France	Emil Pavlov; North Macedonia	Ali El-Sawy; Egypt
Kumite −67 kg	Steven Da Costa; France	Emil Pavlov; North Macedonia	Soichiro Nakano; Japan
Kumite −75 kg	Dastonbek Otabolaev; Uzbekistan	Abdalla Abdelaziz; Egypt	Nurkanat Azhikanov; Kazakhstan
Kumite −75 kg	Dastonbek Otabolaev; Uzbekistan	Abdalla Abdelaziz; Egypt	Thomas Scott; United States
Kumite −84 kg	Youssef Badawy; Egypt	Fabián Huaiquimán; Chile	Yuta Mori; Japan
Kumite −84 kg	Youssef Badawy; Egypt	Fabián Huaiquimán; Chile	Jessie Da Costa; France
Kumite +84 kg	Gogita Arkania; Georgia	Simone Marino; Italy	Anđelo Kvesić; Croatia
Kumite +84 kg	Gogita Arkania; Georgia	Simone Marino; Italy	Asiman Gurbanli; Azerbaijan
Team kumite	Italy; Daniele De Vivo; Gianluca De Vivo; Ahmed El Sharaby; Luca Maresca; Simone Marino; Michele Martina; Lolrenzo Pietromarchi	Serbia; Slobodan Bitević; Vladimir Brezančić; Stefan Joksić; Ljubiša Marić; Ðorđe Salapura; Ðorđe Tešanović; Bogdan Trikoš	Kazakhstan; Nurkanat Azhikanov; Igor Chikhmarev; Abylay Toltay; Nurniyaz Yeldashov; Spandiyar Yerkebek; Daniyar Yuldashev; Beibarys Zhangbyr
Team kumite	Italy; Daniele De Vivo; Gianluca De Vivo; Ahmed El Sharaby; Luca Maresca; Simone Marino; Michele Martina; Lolrenzo Pietromarchi	Serbia; Slobodan Bitević; Vladimir Brezančić; Stefan Joksić; Ljubiša Marić; Ðorđe Salapura; Ðorđe Tešanović; Bogdan Trikoš	Azerbaijan; Panah Abdullayev; Tural Aghalarzade; Rafael Aghayev; Tural Alakbarli; Asiman Gurbanli; Rafiz Hasanov; Turgut Hasanov

=== Women ===
Event	Gold	Silver	Bronze
Individual kata	Sandra Sánchez; Spain	Hikaru Ono; Japan	Grace Lau; Hong Kong
Individual kata	Sandra Sánchez; Spain	Hikaru Ono; Japan	Viviana Bottaro; Italy
Team kata	Japan; Saori Ishibashi; Sae Taira; Misaki Yabumoto	Spain; María López; Lidia Rodríguez; Raquel Roy	Egypt; Noha Amr Antar; Aya Hesham; Asmaa Mahmoud
Team kata	Japan; Saori Ishibashi; Sae Taira; Misaki Yabumoto	Spain; María López; Lidia Rodríguez; Raquel Roy	Italy; Carola Casale; Terryana D'Onofrio; Michela Pezzetti
Kumite −50 kg	Miho Miyahara; Japan	Shara Hubrich; Germany	Kateryna Kryva; Ukraine
Kumite −50 kg	Miho Miyahara; Japan	Shara Hubrich; Germany	Yasmin Nasr Elgewily; Egypt
Kumite −55 kg	Ahlam Youssef; Egypt	Trinity Allen; United States	Ivet Goranova; Bulgaria
Kumite −55 kg	Ahlam Youssef; Egypt	Trinity Allen; United States	Anna Chernysheva; Russian Karate Federation
Kumite −61 kg	Jovana Preković; Serbia	Anita Serogina; Ukraine	Lynn Snel; Netherlands
Kumite −61 kg	Jovana Preković; Serbia	Anita Serogina; Ukraine	Alexandra Grande; Peru
Kumite −68 kg	Irina Zaretska; Azerbaijan	Silvia Semeraro; Italy	Alizée Agier; France
Kumite −68 kg	Irina Zaretska; Azerbaijan	Silvia Semeraro; Italy	Halyna Melnyk; Ukraine
Kumite +68 kg	María Torres; Spain	Menna Shaaban Okila; Egypt	Sofya Berultseva; Kazakhstan
Kumite +68 kg	María Torres; Spain	Menna Shaaban Okila; Egypt	Lucija Lesjak; Croatia
Team kumite	Egypt; Feryal Abdelaziz; Sohila Abouismail; Yasmin Elhawary; Menna Shaaban Okila	France; Alizée Agier; Léa Avazeri; Laura Sivert; Jennifer Zameto	Colombia; Wendy Mosquera; Geraldine Peña; Diana Ramírez; Shanee Torres
Team kumite	Egypt; Feryal Abdelaziz; Sohila Abouismail; Yasmin Elhawary; Menna Shaaban Okila	France; Alizée Agier; Léa Avazeri; Laura Sivert; Jennifer Zameto	Italy; Lorena Busà; Clio Ferracuti; Alessandra Mangiacapra; Silvia Semeraro
