= Malaysia at the 2022 ASEAN University Games =

- IOC code: MAS
- National federation: Malaysian University Sports Council
- Website: www.masum.org.my

in Ubon Ratchathani, Thailand 26 July 2022 – 6 August 2022
- Competitors: 275 in 19 sports
- Flag bearer: Muhammad Aliff Najmi Shaaini
- Medals Ranked 2nd: Gold 49 Silver 83 Bronze 50 Total 182

ASEAN University Games appearances
- auto

Malaysia competed at the 2022 ASEAN University Games in Ubon Ratchathani, Thailand from 26 July to 6 August 2022. The Malaysian contingent consisted of 275 athletes, competing in 19 out 23 sports.

Overall, the Malaysian contingent won 49 golds and was in second position and managed to reach the target of 45 gold medals.

== Medal summary ==
=== Medal by sport ===
Medals by sport
Sport	1st place, gold medalist(s)	2nd place, silver medalist(s)	3rd place, bronze medalist(s)	Total
Archery	4	6	1	11
Athletics	11	22	5	38
Badminton	4	3	4	11
Basketball	0	2	0	2
Chess	4	2	0	6
Fencing	3	3	1	7
Football	0	1	0	1
Futsal	0	0	1	1
Karate	6	8	4	18
Muay Thai	0	2	3	5
Pencak silat	4	5	5	13
Petanque	0	2	3	5
Rowing	1	2	0	3
Swimming	6	11	10	27
Sepak takraw	0	1	2	3
Table tennis	0	0	3	3
Taekwondo	1	6	1	8
Wushu	5	7	7	19
Total	49	83	50	182

=== Medal by date ===
Medals by date
Date	1st place, gold medalist(s)	2nd place, silver medalist(s)	3rd place, bronze medalist(s)	Total
26 July	1	2	1	4
27 July	6	12	4	22
28 July	9	10	9	28
29 July	7	10	5	22
30 July	4	9	5	18
31 July	7	9	6	22
1 August	0	2	0	2
2 August	2	5	4	11
3 August	6	6	4	16
4 August	4	9	4	17
5 August	1	5	4	10
6 August	2	4	4	10
Total	49	83	50	182

=== Medalists ===
Medal	Name	Sport	Event	Date
Gold	Low Zheng Yong	Swimming	Men's 400 m freestyle	26 July
Gold	Kamal Farhan Abdul Rahman	Athletics	Men's shot put	27 July
Gold	Azreen Nabila Alias	Athletics	Women's 100 m	27 July
Gold	Kojiro Yong; Dennis Lim; Chan Zhen Song	Karate	Men's team Kata	27 July
Gold	Shahmalarani Chandran	Karate	Women's −50 kg Kumite	27 July
Gold	Madhuri Poovanesan	Karate	Women's −55 kg Kumite	27 July
Gold	Ong Yong Qi	Swimming	Women's 200 m butterfly	27 July
Gold	Sadat Marzuqi Ajisan	Athletics	Men's hammer throw	28 July
Gold	Mohammad Eizlan Dahalan	Athletics	Men's high jump	28 July
Gold	Luqman Hakim Ramlan	Athletics	Men's long jump	28 July
Gold	Ng Jun Yan; Faiz Rozain; Tai Chuan Zhe; Tan Kok Xian; Tan Yi Han; Faris Zaim; Ameer Amri Zainuddin	Badminton	Men's Team	28 July
Gold	Saranya Navaratnarajah; Lim Jing Ning; Yap Rui Chen; Ng Qi Xuan; Desiree Hao Shan Siow; Teoh Le Xuan; Gan Jing Err	Badminton	Women's Team	28 July
Gold	Sureeya Sankar Hari Sankar	Karate	Men's −67 kg Kumite	28 July
Gold	Arulveeran Denishroy	Karate	Men's +84 kg Kumite	28 July
Gold	Siti Nur Azwani Nor Azli	Karate	Women's −61 kg Kumite	28 July
Gold	Welson Sim	Swimming	Men's 100 m freestyle	28 July
Gold	Wan Muhammad Fazri Wan Zahari	Athletics	Men's 800 m	29 July
Gold	Daren James Nair Rodney James	Athletics	Men's 3000 m steeplechase	29 July
Gold	Savinder Kaur Joginder Singh	Athletics	Women's 800 m	29 July
Gold	Azreen Nabila Alias; Darshini K Murugan; Nor Sarah Adi; Nur Aishah Rofina Aling	Athletics	Women's 4×100 m relay	29 July
Gold	Tengku Amran Sharif	Fencing	Men's individual foil	29 July
Gold	Sebastian Soon	Swimming	Men's 400 m individual medley	29 July
Gold	Terence Ng Shin Jian; Low Zheng Yong; Sebastian Soon; Welson Sim	Swimming	Men's 4×200 m freestyle relay	29 July
Gold	Kirthana Ramasamy	Athletics	Women's high jump	30 July
Gold	Queenie Ting Kung Ni	Athletics	Women's discus throw	30 July
Gold	Philippa Jean Ong Ziyi	Fencing	Women's individual foil	30 July
Gold	Sebastian Soon	Swimming	Men's 1500 m freestyle	30 July
Gold	Muhamad Zarif Syahiir Zolkepeli	Archery	Men's individual recurve bow	31 July
Gold	Iman Aisyah Norazam; Kayalvhily; Nuraqilah Khairul	Archery	Women's team compound bow	31 July
Gold	Nur Afisa Abdul Halil; Nuramalia Haneesha Mazlan; Syaqiera Mashayikh	Archery	Women's team recurve bow	31 July
Gold	Ahmad Afiq Akhiroman; Syaqiera Mashayikh	Archery	Mixed team recurve bow	31 July
Gold	Faiz Rozain	Badminton	Men's singles	31 July
Gold	Teoh Le Xuan; Yap Rui Chen	Badminton	Women's doubles	31 July
Gold	Chong Hong Ling; Hydheer Natakusuma Akson; Lim Jit Ian; Tengku Amran Sharif	Fencing	Men's team foil	31 July
Gold	Atiqah Fakhira Shaiful Azli; Nur Husnina Abdul Hamid; Nurmunirah Zaharudin	Pencak silat	Female regu	2 August
Gold	Nurul Hidayah Abdul Karim	Taekwondo	Women's individual poomsae	2 August
Gold	Rohan Shan Tze Navaratnam	Chess	Men's international individual	3 August
Gold	Amir Ghaazi Mohd Saprin; Muhammad Faqih Aminuddin; Emir Rusyaidi Ahmad Nazari; Di Xu Wei; Rohan Shan Tze Navaratnam	Chess	Men's international team	3 August
Gold	Tan Li Ting	Chess	Women's international individual	3 August
Gold	Aida Suriana Abdul Razak; Rosamund Koo Wei Xin; Tan Li Ting; Sivanesan Nithyalakshmi; Chua Jia-Tien	Chess	Women's international team	3 August
Gold	Nur Adilah Mohamad Zamri	Pencak silat	Female class D (60–65kg)	3 August
Gold	Mohammad Amirul Norhadi	Rowing	Men's lightweight single sculls	3 August
Gold	Putra Syaid Hidayatullah Ramli	Pencak silat	Male class H (80–85kg)	4 August
Gold	Muhammad Haziq Bistaman	Pencak silat	Male class J (90–95kg)	4 August
Gold	Tan Cheong Wan	Wushu	Men's gunshu	4 August
Gold	Tammy Tan Hui Ling	Wushu	Women's jianshu	4 August
Gold	Tan Cheong Min	Wushu	Women's nanquan	5 August
Gold	Ang Qi Yue; Chuah Shangyang	Wushu	Men's dulian	6 August
Gold	Loh Ying Ting; Tan Cheong Min; Tammy Tan Hui Ling	Wushu	Women's dulian	6 August
Silver	Ng Tze Xiang	Swimming	Men's 50 m butterfly	26 July
Silver	Goh Chia Tong	Swimming	Women's 400 m freestyle	26 July
Silver	Muhammad Firdaus Mohamad Zemi	Athletics	Men's 400 m	27 July
Silver	Mohd Amirul Arif Azri	Athletics	Men's 1500 m	27 July
Silver	Nor Sarah Adi	Athletics	Women's 100 m	27 July
Silver	Teoh Kim Chyi	Athletics	Women's 400 m	27 July
Silver	Nurul Hidayah Lukman	Athletics	Women's hammer throw	27 July
Silver	Kirthana Ramasamy	Athletics	Women's triple jump	27 July
Silver	Chan Zhen Song	Karate	Men's individual Kata	27 July
Silver	Madeline Wong Mei Ge	Karate	Women's individual Kata	27 July
Silver	Dharshini Gnanasekaran	Karate	Women's −55 kg Kumite	27 July
Silver	Welson Sim	Swimming	Men's 200 m freestyle	27 July
Silver	Terence Ng Shin Jian; Hii Puong Wei; Ng Tze Xiang; Welson Sim	Swimming	Men's 4×100 m freestyle relay	27 July
Silver	Lim Shun Qi; Lim Xiao Wei; Christy Teh Xing Ti; Leong Wan Mei	Swimming	Women's 4×100 m freestyle relay	27 July
Silver	Ruslem Zikry Putra Roseli	Athletics	Men's 400 m hurdles	28 July
Silver	Maslan Mosrin	Athletics	Men's high jump	28 July
Silver	Nurul Ashikin Hussin	Athletics	Women's 10,000 m walk	28 July
Silver	Nur Aishah Rofina Aling	Athletics	Women's 200 m	28 July
Silver	Mandy Goh Li	Athletics	Women's 400 m hurdles	28 July
Silver	Nani Sahirah Maryata	Athletics	Women's shot put	28 July
Silver	Geerijaieswaran Pillai Sivanesan	Karate	Men's −60 kg Kumite	28 July
Silver	Kathish Gnanasekaran	Karate	Men's −84 kg Kumite	28 July
Silver	Aisyah Izzmiah Datu Ahmad	Karate	Women's −68 kg Kumite	28 July
Silver	Hii Puong Wei	Swimming	Men's 200 m individual medley	28 July
Silver	Yusridwan Danial Yusof; Jonathan Nyepa; Mohamad Raimi Mustaffa Kamal; Ryan Wong Zhen Nam	Athletics	Men's 4×100 m relay	29 July
Silver	Syed Abrar Syed Ahmad Zawawi	Athletics	Men's javelin throw	29 July
Silver	Kirthana Ramasamy	Athletics	Women's long jump	29 July
Silver	Nor Sarah Adi	Athletics	Women's pole vault	29 July
Silver	Hydeer Natakusuma Akson	Fencing	Men's individual foil	29 July
Silver	Yap Jing Xuan	Fencing	Women's individual epee	29 July
Silver	Geerijaieswaran Pillai Sivanesan; Kueggen Vijaya Kumar; Arif Afifuddin Ab Malik	Karate	Men's team Kumite	29 July
Silver	Dharshini Gnanasekaran; Madhuri Poovanesan; Shahmalarani Chandran; Siti Nur Azwani Nor Azli	Karate	Women's team Kumite	29 July
Silver	Low Zheng Yong	Swimming	Men's 400 m individual medley	29 July
Silver	Goh Chia Tong	Swimming	Women's 400 m individual medley	29 July
Silver	Mohd Rizzua Haizad Muhamad	Athletics	Men's 110 m hurdles	30 July
Silver	Ruslem Zikry Putra Roseli; Wan Muhammad Fazri Wan Zahari; Muhammad Firdaus Mohamad Zemi; Muhammad Ilham Suhaimi	Athletics	Men's 4×400 m relay	30 July
Silver	Juriani Mat Rodzi	Athletics	Women's 100 m hurdles	30 July
Silver	Darshini K Murugan; Mandy Goh Li; Nur Athirah Khairul Noormizan; Teoh Kim Chyi	Athletics	Women's 4×400 m relay	30 July
Silver	Ng Yu Jie	Athletics	Women's high jump	30 July
Silver	Nur Atiqah Sufiah Md Hanizam	Athletics	Women's discus throw	30 July
Silver	Welson Sim	Swimming	Men's 1500 m freestyle	30 July
Silver	Hii Puong Wei	Swimming	Men's 50 m breaststroke	30 July
Silver	Lim Shun Qi	Swimming	Women's 100 m butterfly	30 July
Silver	Mohamad Syafiq Md Ariffin	Archery	Men's individual compound bow	31 July
Silver	Amirul Amin Abd Rahim; Eugenius Lo Foh Soon; Mohamad Syafiq Md Ariffin	Archery	Men's team compound bow	31 July
Silver	Ahmad Afiq Akhiroman; Muhamad Zarif Syahiir Zolkepeli; Muhammad Farhan Hakim A Rhyme	Archery	Men's team recurve bow	31 July
Silver	Iman Aisyah Norazam	Archery	Women's individual compound bow	31 July
Silver	Syaqiera Mashayikh	Archery	Women's individual recurve bow	31 July
Silver	Iman Aisyah Norazam; Mohamad Syafiq Md Ariffin	Archery	Mixed team compound bow	31 July
Silver	Ameer Amri Zainuddin; Faris Zaim	Badminton	Men's doubles	31 July
Silver	Desiree Hao Shan Siow; Ng Qi Xuan	Badminton	Women's doubles	31 July
Silver	Desiree Hao Shan Siow; Tan Kok Xian	Badminton	Mixed doubles	31 July
Silver	Hydheer Natakusuma Akson; Isaac Kai Xuan Seet; Lim Jit Ian; Muhammad Aiman Najmi Mohd Zafril Rizal	Fencing	Men's team epee	1 August
Silver	Haris Jonaidey	Petanque	Men's singles	1 August
Silver	Mohamad Nur Syahmi Rohamidi	Pencak silat	Male tunggal	2 August
Silver	Luqman Nul Hakim Che Abdullah; Mohammad Ammar Sufi Mohammad Rosli	Pencak silat	Male ganda	2 August
Silver	Muhammad Amirul Haiqal Mohamad Yusuf; Muhammad Faiz Danial Mohd Dahalam; Muhammad Nur Hafiz Yusoff Khalid	Pencak silat	Male regu	2 August
Silver	Jason Loo Jun Wei	Taekwondo	Men's individual poomsae	2 August
Silver	Jason Loo Jun Wei; Nurul Hidayah Abdul Karim	Taekwondo	Mixed pair poomsae	2 August
Silver	Muhammad Faqih Aminuddin	Chess	Men's international individual	3 August
Silver	Chua Jia-Tien	Chess	Women's international individual	3 August
Silver	Syed Akmal Fikri Syed Ali; Sharifah Aqilah Farhana Syed Ali	Petanque	Mixed doubles	3 August
Silver	Muhammad Luqman Haqim Mohd Suhaimi	Taekwondo	Men's kyorugi -87 kg	3 August
Silver	Tan Cheong Wan	Wushu	Men's changquan	3 August
Silver	Chuah Shangyang	Wushu	Men's nanquan	3 August
Silver	Kabilan Jelevan Thiagarajan	Muay Thai	Men's lightweight 57 kg to 60 kg	4 August
Silver	Saifullah Ismail	Muay Thai	Men's light welterweight 60 kg to 63.5 kg	4 August
Silver	Nurizzaty Natasha Kamaruddin	Pencak silat	Female class B (50–55kg)	4 August
Silver	Nur Amira Izzati Khalid	Pencak silat	Female class C (55–60kg)	4 August
Silver	Malaysian university sepak takraw team	Sepak takraw	Men's team	4 August
Silver	Fu Ceen Put Thai	Taekwondo	Men's kyorugi -54 kg	4 August
Silver	Fu Cern Put Thai	Taekwondo	Men's kyorugi -58 kg	4 August
Silver	Chuah Shangyang	Wushu	Men's nangun	4 August
Silver	Sydney Chin Sy Xuan	Wushu	Women's taijiquan	4 August
Silver	Malaysian university football team	Football	Men's team	5 August
Silver	Sheikh Ahmad Safwan Shaikh Sabri; Mohamad Alimin Mohd Pauzi; Muhammad Nurhadie Muhammad Aizad; Hafiy Hibatullah Mohd Zaid	Rowing	Men's four (1000 m)	5 August
Silver	Ahmad Nor Iman Hakim Rakib	Taekwondo	Men's kyorugi -68 kg	5 August
Silver	Tan Cheong Wan	Wushu	Men's daoshu	5 August
Silver	Lee Jia Rong	Wushu	Women's qiangshu	5 August
Silver	Malaysian men's university basketball team	Basketball	Men's team	6 August
Silver	Malaysian women's university basketball team	Basketball	Women's team	6 August
Silver	Nurzarinah Zakaria; Nur Asyikin Mohd Azahari; Nur Ratna Suani; Nur Najiha Zainal	Rowing	Women's four (1000 m)	6 August
Silver	Tan Cheong Min	Wushu	Women's nandao	6 August
Bronze	Welson Sim	Swimming	Men's 400 m freestyle	26 July
Bronze	Savinder Kaur Joginder Singh	Athletics	Women's 1500 m	27 July
Bronze	Kojiro Yong	Karate	Men's individual Kata	27 July
Bronze	Low Zheng Yong	Swimming	Men's 200 m butterfly	27 July
Bronze	Terence Ng Shin Jian	Swimming	Men's 200 m freestyle	27 July
Bronze	Darshini K Murugan	Athletics	Women's 200 m	28 July
Bronze	Arif Afifuddin Ab Malik	Karate	Men's −75 kg Kumite	28 July
Bronze	Sukunaselan Rajev Naidu	Karate	Men's −85 kg Kumite	28 July
Bronze	Amirah Syahirah Azlan	Karate	Women's −68 kg Kumite	28 July
Bronze	Terence Ng Shin Jian	Swimming	Men's 100 m freestyle	28 July
Bronze	Hii Puong Wei; Ng Jing Fu; Ng Tze Xiang; Welson Sim	Swimming	Men's 4×100 m medley relay	28 July
Bronze	Goh Chia Tong; Lee Yen Yi; Lim Shun Qi; Leong Wan Mei	Swimming	Women's 4×100 m medley relay	28 July
Bronze	Danny Ng Wann Sing; Tan Yi Heng; Christopher Isaac Goh-Kho	Table tennis	Men's Team	28 July
Bronze	Aina Zayani Mohammad Amri; Crystal Tiong Hui Man; Tey Ka Ying	Table tennis	Women's Team	28 July
Bronze	Eugenius Lo Foh Soon	Archery	Men's individual compound bow	29 July
Bronze	Kamal Farhan Abdul Rahman	Athletics	Men's discus throw	29 July
Bronze	Ng Jing Fu	Swimming	Men's 100 m breaststroke	29 July
Bronze	Ong Yong Qi	Swimming	Women's 400 m individual medley	29 July
Bronze	Danny Ng Wann Sing; Tey Ka Ying	Table tennis	Mixed doubles	29 July
Bronze	Benedict Ian Gawok	Athletics	Men's 110 m hurdles	30 July
Bronze	Rammiyah Balasingam	Athletics	Women's 3000 m steeplechase	30 July
Bronze	Isaac Kai Xuan Seet	Fencing	Men's individual epee	30 July
Bronze	Ng Tze Xiang	Swimming	Men's 100 m butterfly	30 July
Bronze	Leong Wan Mei; Ong Yong Qi; Ho Keesha; Goh Chia Tong	Swimming	Women's 4×200 m freestyle relay	30 July
Bronze	Tai Chuan Zhe	Badminton	Men's singles	31 July
Bronze	Tan Kok Xian; Tan Yi Han	Badminton	Men's doubles	31 July
Bronze	Saranya Navaratnarajah	Badminton	Women's singles	31 July
Bronze	Faris Zaim; Gan Jing Err	Badminton	Mixed doubles	31 July
Bronze	Khuzairi Azim Mohd Kamal	Muay Thai	Men's light flyweight 45 kg to 48 kg	31 July
Bronze	Mohamad Ali Ismail	Muay Thai	Men's bantamweight 51 kg to 54 kg	31 July
Bronze	Malaysian university futsal team	Futsal	Men's team	2 August
Bronze	Hatem Rumijam	Muay Thai	Men's featherweight 54 kg to 57 kg	2 August
Bronze	Mirsha Nurathiqa Mirnawan	Pencak silat	Female tunggal	2 August
Bronze	Nur Fazlina Syafiqa Mohd Fairus	Pencak silat	Female match class A (45-50kg)	2 August
Bronze	Muhammad Ziyad Irham Mohd Rafi	Pencak silat	Male match opencalss (+85kg)	3 August
Bronze	Nurashimah Senin; Sharifah Aqilah Farhana Syed Ali	Petanque	Women's doubles	3 August
Bronze	Ang Qi Yue	Wushu	Men's changquan	3 August
Bronze	Calvin Lee Wai Leong	Wushu	Men's nanquan	3 August
Bronze	Muhammad Allif Hakimi Azhar	Pencak silat	Male class D (60–65kg)	4 August
Bronze	Puteri Farah Diba Natasha Zakaria	Taekwondo	Women's kyorugi -73 kg	4 August
Bronze	Calvin Lee Wai Leong	Wushu	Men's nangun	4 August
Bronze	Loh Ying Ting	Wushu	Women's jianshu	4 August
Bronze	Muhammad Fitri Naim Azmi	Pencak silat	Male class E (65–70kg)	5 August
Bronze	Ahmad Ghazirullah Mohd Fauzi; Ayzek Hakimi Safingan; Syed Afiq Fakhri Syed Ali; Syed Akmal Fikri Syed Ali	Petanque	Men's triples	5 August
Bronze	Nur Shazleen Ilyana Sharifuddin; Nurashimah Senin; Nurul Intan Syafiqah Osman; Wong Yun Hui	Petanque	Women's triples	5 August
Bronze	Tammy Tan Hui Ling	Wushu	Women's qiangshu	5 August
Bronze	Najmi Syahfiq Anuar; Wan Muhammad Syazwan Wan Mohd Asri; Mohammad Zafran Khairon Anwar	Sepak takraw	Men's doubles	6 August
Bronze	Amir Syahiran Mohd Fuzi; Mohammad Nazhan Noor Zamri; Muhammad Faisal Mohd Fuad	Sepak takraw	Men's regu	6 August
Bronze	Sydney Chin Sy Xuan	Wushu	Women's taijijian	6 August
Bronze	Sydney Chin Sy Xuan; Lee Jia Rong; Mandy Cebelle Chen	Wushu	Women's dulian	6 August

== Badminton ==
Singles

Athlete	Event	Qualifying round	Semifinal	Final / BM	
Athlete	Event	Opposition Score	Opposition Score	Opposition Score	Rank
Faiz Rozain	Men's singles	Punyapat Thipthaveecharn (THA); W 2–0	Muhammad Febriansyah (INA); W 2–0	Rafi Zafran Ferary (INA); W 2–0	1st place, gold medalist(s)
Tai Chuan Zhe	Men's singles	Vixunnalath Phichith (LAO); W 2–0	Rafi Zafran Ferary (INA); L 0–2	Muhammad Febriansyah (INA); W 2–0	3rd place, bronze medalist(s)
Saranya Navaratnarajah	Women's singles	Ladapa Singkaew (THA); W 2–0	Aurum Oktavia Winata (INA); L 0–2	Lim Jing Ning (MAS); W 2–0	3rd place, bronze medalist(s)
Lim Jing Ning	Women's singles	Ashley Lee Shi Hui (SGP); W 2–0	Sri Fatmawati (INA); L 0–2	Saranya Navaratnarajah (MAS); L 0–2	4

Doubles

Athlete	Event	Qualifying round	Semifinal	Final / BM	
Athlete	Event	Opposition Score	Opposition Score	Opposition Score	Rank
Ameer Amri Zainuddin; Faris Zaim	Men's doubles	Rakmesri Panu / Dechkongton Trijsanun (THA); W 2–0	Jing Hung Ezekiel Ang / Lee Chak Fai Brennan (SGP); W 2–0	Reza Dwicahya Purnama / Muhammad Nendi Novatino (INA); L 0–2	2nd place, silver medalist(s)
Tan Kok Xian; Tan Yi Han	Men's doubles	Li Zhengxi / Ming En Alistaire Chua (SGP); W 2–1	Reza Dwicahya Purnama / Muhammad Nendi Novatino (INA); L 0–2	Jing Hung Ezekiel Ang / Lee Chak Fai Brennan (SGP); W 2–0	3rd place, bronze medalist(s)
Teoh Le Xuan; Yap Rui Chen	Women's doubles	Yap Wen Shien / Kong Shih Yeng Tricia (SGP); W 2–0	Nahla Aufa Dhia Ulhaq / Elizabeth Jovita (INA); W 2–0	Desiree Hao Shan Siow / Ng Qi Xuan (MAS); W 2–1	1st place, gold medalist(s)
Desiree Hao Shan Siow; Ng Qi Xuan	Women's doubles	Bye	Pornnicha Suwatnodom / Sasikarn Piyawatcharavijit (THA); W 2–0	Teoh Le Xuan / Yap Rui Chen (MAS); L 1–2	2nd place, silver medalist(s)
Desiree Hao Shan Siow; Tan Kok Xian	Mixed doubles	Indonesia; W 2–1	Nareerat Hongsa / Rakmesri Panu (THA); W 2–0	Dwiki Rafian Restu / Elizabeth Jovita (INA); L 0–2	2nd place, silver medalist(s)
Faris Zaim; Gan Jing Err	Mixed doubles	Singapore; W 2–0	Dwiki Rafian Restu / Elizabeth Jovita (INA); L 0–2	Nareerat Hongsa / Rakmesri Panu (THA); W 2–0	3rd place, bronze medalist(s)

Team

Team	Event	First round			Final / BM	
Team	Event	Opposition Score	Opposition Score	Opposition Score	Opposition Score	Rank
Ng Jun Yan; Faiz Rozain; Tai Chuan Zhe; Tan Kok Xian; Tan Yi Han; Faris Zaim; Ameer Amri Zainuddin	Men's team	Thailand; W 4–1	Indonesia; L 2–3	Singapore; W 5–0	Indonesia; W 3–0	1st place, gold medalist(s)
Saranya Navaratnarajah; Lim Jing Ning; Yap Rui Chen; Ng Qi Xuan; Desiree Hao Shan Siow; Teoh Le Xuan; Gan Jing Err	Women's team	Indonesia; W 3–2	Thailand; W 5–0	Singapore; W 5–0	Indonesia; W 3–2	1st place, gold medalist(s)

== Basketball ==
Team	Event	Qualifying round			Semifinal	3rd place	Final	
Team	Event	Opposition Score	Opposition Score	Opposition Score	Opposition Score	Opposition Score	Opposition Score	Final Rank
Malaysia men's	Men's team	Thailand; L 58–63	Philippines; W 74–53	Singapore; W 64–47	—N/a	—N/a	Thailand; L 59–44	2nd place, silver medalist(s)
Malaysia women's	Women's team	Thailand; L 58–88	Singapore; W 63–35	—N/a	Singapore; W 48–39	—N/a	Thailand; L 57–80	2nd place, silver medalist(s)

Men's squad

- Chan Yew Thung
- Chang Zi Fueng
- Wee Yiang De
- Jing Hung Lee
- Chee Li Wei
- Zhong Shin Thea
- Wee Yong Gan
- Jun Yuan Diong
- Jason Lee Shu Wen
- Liew Wei Young
- Yip Hong Chan
- Anthony Liew Wen Qian

Women's squad

- Carmen Chan
- Weng Yen Chan
- Li Xuan Lee
- Chia Cheng Xuan
- Lee Pei Ling
- Nur Adila Shahira Juraimi
- Mei Ling Chow
- Chia Qian Tai
- Hee Heong Yee
- Sany Tan Suet Nie
- Wei Yun Tan
- Sze Qian Wong

== Football ==
Team	Event	Qualifying round			Final / BM	
Team	Event	Opposition Score	Opposition Score	Opposition Score	Opposition Score	Rank
Malaysia men's	Men's team	Myanmar; W 2–1	Thailand; D 2–2	Laos; L 1–2	Thailand; L 1–2	2nd place, silver medalist(s)

Squad

- Mohd Alief Najmi Mohd Radzi
- Ahmad Hijazi Mohd Muhyiddin
- Muhammad Darwisy Abdullah
- Muhammad Zulkarnain Mohd Nasir
- Mohamad Syahir Abdul Rahman
- Syed Muhammad Irfan Syed Mohd Kamil
- Zahrul Nizam Zamri
- Amirul Fazly Mohd Zamri
- Muhammad Aliff Mohamad Muhazni
- Muhammad Ibrahim Azfar Harun
- Amir Haziq Mohd Fadzli
- Muhammad Aliff Najmi Shaaini
- Abdul Hadi Muhammad
- Adam Iskandar Mohd Isyak
- Muhammad Iman Hakimi Aznan
- Nik Akmal Rezal Aminun Izham
- Saiful Iskandar Adha Saiful Azlan
- Wan Syamil Sulaiman Wan Salman

== Futsal ==
Team	Event	Qualifying round		Semifinal	3rd place	Final	
Team	Event	Opposition Score	Opposition Score	Opposition Score	Opposition Score	Opposition Score	Final Rank
Malaysia men's	Men's team	Thailand; L 1–7	Vietnam; L 1–2	—N/a	Thailand; L 1–4	—N/a	3rd place, bronze medalist(s)

Squad

- Adam Arieef Ab Rahim
- Hamdin Zarif Mahmun
- Iskandar Aliff
- Muhammad Alif Haiqal Asri
- Amirul Aiman Hairol Nizan
- Muhammad Hafizi Marzuki
- Muhammad Haiqal Hasnor
- Muhammad Rashidie Mahadi
- Muhammad Syarifuddin Md Akhir
- Zainulzahin Sinuan
- Muhammad Arif Roslan
- Ahmad Muazzim Ahmad Shakri
- Mohd Farhan Arman
