= Indonesia at the 2022 ASEAN University Games =

- IPC code: INA
- NPC: Indonesian Olympic Committee
- Website: www.npcindonesia.org (in Indonesian)

in Ubon Ratchathani
- Medals: Gold 0 Silver 0 Bronze 0 Total 0

ASEAN University Games appearances
- 1981; 1982; 1984; 1986; 1988; 1990; 1993; 1994; 1996; 1999; 2002; 2004; 2006; 2008; 2012; 2014; 2016; 2018; 2022

Indonesia competed at the 2022 ASEAN University Games in Ubon Rachathani, Thailand. 2022 ASEAN University Games will be the 20th edition of the ASEAN University Games. It will be held from 26 July to 6 August 2022 in Ubon Ratchathani, Thailand. Originally planned to take place from 13 to 22 December 2020, it was eventually rescheduled as a result of the COVID-19 pandemic.

== Medal summary ==
=== Medal by sport ===
Medals by sport
Sport	1st place, gold medalist(s)	2nd place, silver medalist(s)	3rd place, bronze medalist(s)	Total
Swimming	10	13	15	38
Karate	8	2	1	11
Sport Climbing	6	4	2	9
Archery	4	1	3	8
Badminton	3	4	1	8
Athletics	1	7	5	13
Pencak Silat	1	0	1	2
Taekwondo	0	0	2	2
Total	33	29	32	94

=== Medal by date ===
Medals by date
Date	1st place, gold medalist(s)	2nd place, silver medalist(s)	3rd place, bronze medalist(s)	Total
26 July	2	4	4	10
27 July	6	2	6	14
28 July	5	12	7	24
29 July	8	3	3	14
30 July	2	4	8	14
31 July	7	3	1	11
1 August	2	1	0	3
2 August	1	0	3	4
3 August				
4 August				
5 August				
6 August				
Total	33	29	32	94

=== Medalists ===
Medal	Name	Sport	Event	Date
Gold	Farrel Armandio Tangkas	Swimming	Men's 200m backstroke	26 July
Gold	Pande Made Iron Digjaya	Swimming	Men's 200m breaststroke	26 July
Gold	Ahmad Zigi Zaresta Yuda	Karate	Kata individual men	27 July
Gold	Krisda Putri Aprilia	Karate	Kata individual women	27 July
Gold	Anugerah Nurul Lucky; Emilia Sri Hanandyta; Dian Monika Nababan	Karate	Kata team women	27 July
Gold	Erick Ahmad; Nicholas Karel; Farrel Armandio; Joe Aditya	Swimming	Men's 4×100m freestyle relay	27 July
Gold	Joe Aditya Wijaya Kurniawan	Swimming	Men's 200m freestyle	27 July
Gold	Farrel Armandio Tangkas	Swimming	Men's 100m backstroke	27 July
Gold	Alivany Ver Khadijah	Sport Climbing	Women Speed	28 July
Gold	Ceyco Georgia Zefanya	Karate	Kumite -68kg women	28 July
Gold	Ari Saputra	Karate	Kumite -60kg men	28 July
Gold	Sandy Firmansyah	Karate	Kumite -84kg men	28 July
Gold	Prada Hanan Farmadini	Swimming	Women's 800m freestyle	28 July
Gold	Rahmad Adi Mulyono; Aditya Tri Syahria; Fatchur Roji	Sport Climbing	Speed relay team men	29 July
Gold	Alivany Ver Khadijah; Susan Nurhidayah; Puja Lestari	Sport Climbing	Speed relay team women	29 July
Gold	Nur Halim Arlendi; Ari Saputra; Ignatius Joshua Kandou	Karate	Kumite team men	29 July
Gold	Ceyco Georgia Zefanya; Dwi Fadhilah; Kartika Herliana	Karate	Kumite team women	29 July
Gold	Joe Aditya Wijaya Kurniawan	Swimming	Men's 50m freestyle	29 July
Gold	Azzahra Permatahani	Swimming	Women's 400m individual medley	29 July
Gold	Pande Made Iron Digjaya	Swimming	Men's 100m breaststroke	29 July
Gold	Diva Renatta Jayadi	Athletics	Women's pole vault	29 July
Gold	Kharisma Ragil Rakasiwi	Athletics	Women's lead	30 July
Gold	Azzahra Permatahani; Angel Gabriella; Prada Hanan Farmadini; Adinda Larasati	Swimming	Women's 4×200m freestyle relay	30 July
Gold	Reza Dwicahya Purnama; Nendi Novatino Muhammad	Badminton	Men's double	31 July
Gold	Dwiki Rafian Restu; Elizabeth Jovita	Badminton	Mixed double	31 July
Gold	Aurum Oktavia Winata	Badminton	Women's singles	31 July
Gold	Rezza Octavia	Archery	Women's individual recurve	31 July
Gold	Hendika Pratama Putra	Archery	Men's individual compound	31 July
Gold	Hendika Pratama Putra; Yogi Pratama	Archery	Men's team compound	31 July
Gold	Hendika Pratama Putra; Syahara Khoerunisa	Archery	Mixed team compound	31 July
Gold	Fatchur Roji	Sport Climbing	Men's boulder	1 August
Gold	Widia Fujiyanti	Sport Climbing	Women's boulder	1 August
Gold	Deslya Anggraini	Pencak Silat	Seni tunggal female	2 August

== Archery ==
Athlete	Event	Ranking round		Round of 32	Round of 16	Quarter-finals	Semi-finals	GM / BM	
Athlete	Event	Score	Seed	Opposition Score	Opposition Score	Opposition Score	Opposition Score	Opposition Score	Rank
Arif Dwi Pangestu	Men's individual								
Yogi Pratama	Men's individual								

== Athletics (track and field) ==
Key

- Note–Ranks given for track events are within the athlete's heat only
- Q = Qualified for the next round
- q = Qualified for the next round as a fastest loser or, in field events, by position without achieving the qualifying target
- NR = National record
- N/A = Round not applicable for the event
- Bye = Athlete not required to compete in round

Track & road events
Women

Athlete	Event	Heat		Quarterfinal		Semifinal		Final	
Athlete	Event	Time	Rank	Time	Rank	Time	Rank	Time	Rank
Rahma Anisa	400 m								

== Badminton ==
SINGLES
Athlete	Event	Qualifying round	Semifinal	Final / BM	
Athlete	Event	Opposition Score	Opposition Score	Opposition Score	Rank
MUHAMMAD RAFI ZAFRAN FERARY	Men's singles	Nimitpornchai Panukorn (THA); W 2–0	Tai Chuan Zhe (MAS); W 2–0	Faiz Rozain (MAS); L 0–2	2nd place, silver medalist(s)
MUHAMMAD FEBRIANSYAH	Men's singles	SYPASEUTH NATTHAVOUTH (LAO); W 2–0	Rozain Faiz (MAS); L 0–2	Tai Chuan Zhe (MAS); L 0–2	4
AURUM OKTAVIA WINATA	Women's singles	Ng Shu Lin Jane (SGP); W 2–0	Saranya Navaratnarajah (MAS); W 2–0	Sri Fatmawati (INA); W 2–1	1st place, gold medalist(s)
Sri Fatmawati	Women's singles	Sukwatthanakarnwit Piengpor (THA); W 2–0	Lim Jing Ning (MAS); W 2–0	Aurum Oktavia Winata (INA); L 1–2	2nd place, silver medalist(s)

DOUBLES
Athlete	Event	Qualifying round	Semifinal	Final / BM	
Athlete	Event	Opposition Score	Opposition Score	Opposition Score	Rank
REZA DWICAHYA PURNAMA / NENDI NOVATINO MUHAMMAD	Men's doubles	Rakmesri Panu / Dechkongton Trijsanun (THA); W 2–1	Tan Kok Xian / Tan Yi Han (MAS); W 2–0	Ameer Amri Zainuddin / Abdul Khalid Mohammad Faris Zaim (MAS); W 2–0	1st place, gold medalist(s)
ULHAQ NAHLA AUFA DHIA / ELIZABETH JOVITA	Women's doubles	Dechkongton Trijsanun / Siriwadhanakul Ornicha (THA); W 2–0	Teoh Le Xuan / Yap Rui Chen (MAS); L 0–2	Pornnicha Suwatnodom / Sasikarn Piyawatcharavijit (THA); W 2–1	3rd place, bronze medalist(s)
DWIKI RAFIAN RESTU / ELIZABETH JOVITA	Mixed doubles	Rakmesri Panu / Suwatnodom Pornnicha (THA); W 2–0	Abdul Khalid Mohammad Fariz Zaim / Gan Jing Err (MAS); W 2–0	Desiree Hao Shan Siow / Tan Kok Xian (MAS); W 2–0	1st place, gold medalist(s)

TEAM
Team	Event	First round			Final / BM	
Team	Event	Opposition Score	Opposition Score	Opposition Score	Opposition Score	Rank
MUHAMMAD RAFI ZAFRAN FERARY; MUHAMMAD FEBRIANSYAH; REZA DWICAHYA PURNAMA; NENDI NOVATINO MUHAMMAD; DWIKI RAFIAN RESTU	Men's team	Singapore; W 5–0	Malaysia; W 3–2	Thailand; W 3–2	Malaysia; L 0–3	2nd place, silver medalist(s)
Aurum Oktavia Winata; Sri Fatmawati; CAHYADEWI DEBORA PUNGKY; ULHAQ NAHLA AUFA DHIA; ELIZABETH JOVITA	Women's team	Malaysia; L 2–3	Singapore; W 5–0	Thailand; W 4–1	Malaysia; L 2–3	2nd place, silver medalist(s)

== Pencak silat ==
Tanding

Athlete	Event	Quarterfinals	Semifinals	Final	
Athlete	Event	Opposition Result	Opposition Result	Opposition Result	Rank
Kadek Andrey Nova Prayada	Men's 70–75 kg				

== Sport climbing ==
Men

- Aditya Sri Syahria
- Rahmat Adi Mulyono
- Panji Mohammad Paisal
- Fathrul Roji
- Kharisma Ragil

Women

- Alivanny Ver Khadijah
- Himalaya
- Puja Lestari
- Susan Nurhidayah
- Widia Fujiyanti

== Swimming ==
Athlete	Event	Heat		Final	
Athlete	Event	Time	Rank	Time	Rank
Pande Made Iron	Men's 50 m freestyle				
Pande Made Iron	Men's 100 m freestyle				
Pande Made Iron	Men's 200 m freestyle				

Preceded by Naypyidaw; 2018	ASEAN University Games; Ubon Ratchathani; XX ASEAN University Games (2022)	Succeeded by
