= 2023 World Karate Championships – Women's individual kata =

Women's individual kata at the 2023 World Karate Championships
- Venue: László Papp Budapest Sports Arena
- Location: Budapest, Hungary
- Dates: 24, 28 October
- Competitors: 57 from 57 nations

Medalists
gold medal	Hikaru Ono	Japan
silver medal	Grace Lau	Hong Kong
bronze medal	Paola García	Spain
bronze medal	Terryana D'Onofrio	Italy

The women's individual kata competition at the 2023 World Karate Championships was held on 24 and 28 October 2023.

== Results ==
=== Round 1 ===
Rank	Pool 1		Pool 2		Pool 3		Pool 4	
Rank	Athlete	Total	Athlete	Total	Athlete	Total	Athlete	Total
1	(Italy) Terryana D'Onofrio	39.9	(United States) Sakura Kokumai	40.5	(Portugal) Ana Cruz	40.1	(Hong Kong) Grace Lau	41.1
2	(France) Helvétia Taily	39.7	(Hungary) Laura Sterck	39.6	(Venezuela) Andrea Armada	39.5	(Greece) Georgia Xenou	39.5
3	(Indonesia) Krisda Putri Aprilia	39.2	(Croatia) Ivana Raguž	38.9	(Denmark) Frederikke Bjerring	37.0	(Vietnam) Nguyễn Thị Phương	39.4
4	(Algeria) Narimène Dahleb	38.6	(Brazil) Naomi Hypólito	35.9	(Peru) Saida Salcedo	36.6	(Bosnia and Herzegovina) Isidora Borovčanin	37.2
5	(Chinese Taipei) Chien Hui-hsuan	38.0	(Mexico) Yaneth Quiroz	35.8	(Switzerland) Melinda Mark	36.3	(Lithuania) Meda Kalibataitė	36.9
6	(Netherlands) Soraya Wahjudi	37.5	(Serbia) Bojana Mladežić	35.6	(Macau) Sou Soi Lam	36.1	(Romania) Isabella Costanzo	36.0
7	(Poland) Anna Kowalska	36.6	(Kazakhstan) Liya Koshkarbayeva	35.3	Veranika Baravik	35.7	(Saudi Arabia) Manal Al-Zaid	
8	(Iceland) Eydís Magnea Friðriksdóttir	35.2						
Rank	Pool 5		Pool 6		Pool 7		Pool 8	
Rank	Athlete	Total	Athlete	Total	Athlete	Total	Athlete	Total
1	(Finland) Bess Mänty	39.2	(Egypt) Aya Hesham	40.0	(Turkey) Dilara Bozan	40.8	(Japan) Hikaru Ono	42.3
2	(Czech Republic) Veronika Míšková	39.1	(Canada) Claudia Laos-Loo	37.7	(Germany) Jasmin Jüttner	39.7	(Spain) Paola García	41.0
3	(Morocco) Aya En-Nesyry	39.0	(Belgium) Chiara Manca	37.4	(Philippines) Sakura Alforte	39.7	(Singapore) Shannon Leong	38.5
4	(New Zealand) Holly Wigg	37.1	(Austria) Jutta Rath	37.0	(Iran) Mahsa Afsaneh	39.1	(Malaysia) Lovelly Anne Robberth	38.4
5	(Kosovo) Alma Loki	36.9	(Colombia) Natalia Pachón	36.9	(Ukraine) Halyna Zaporozhchenko	35.7 b	(Australia) Marijana Dimoska	38.2
6	(Republic of Ireland) Eimear Porter	32.1	Anna Shcherbina	36.7	(Norway) Maria Månum Moen	35.1	(England) Danni Williams	38.0
7	(Cayman Islands) Sarah Hydes	30.4	(Slovakia) Jana Vaňušaniková	36.6	(Moldova) Elena Berezovscaia	32.5	(Chile) Carol de la Paz	34.9

=== Round 2 ===
Rank	Pool 1		Pool 2		Pool 3		Pool 4	
Rank	Athlete	Total	Athlete	Total	Athlete	Total	Athlete	Total
1	(United States) Sakura Kokumai	41.5	(Hong Kong) Grace Lau	43.2	(Egypt) Aya Hesham	41.0	(Japan) Hikaru Ono	43.2
2	(Italy) Terryana D'Onofrio	40.9	(Portugal) Ana Cruz	40.8	(Morocco) Aya En-Nesyry	40.1	(Spain) Paola García	41.8
3	(Indonesia) Krisda Putri Aprilia	40.6	(Greece) Georgia Xenou	40.7	(Czech Republic) Veronika Míšková	39.8	(Turkey) Dilara Bozan	41.5
4	(Hungary) Laura Sterck	40.4	(Vietnam) Nguyễn Thị Phương	40.3	(Belgium) Chiara Manca	38.6	(Iran) Mahsa Afsaneh	40.4
5	(Croatia) Ivana Raguž	39.3	(Venezuela) Andrea Armada	39.6	(Finland) Bess Mänty	38.5	(Philippines) Sakura Alforte	40.2
6	(France) Helvétia Taily	38.9	(Denmark) Frederikke Bjerring	38.2	(New Zealand) Holly Wigg	38.3	(Germany) Jasmin Jüttner	39.8
7	(Brazil) Naomi Hypólito	38.2	(Peru) Saida Salcedo	37.7	(Canada) Claudia Laos-Loo	37.6	(Malaysia) Lovelly Anne Robberth	37.7
8	(Algeria) Narimène Dahleb	37.0	(Bosnia and Herzegovina) Isidora Borovčanin	37.2	(Austria) Jutta Rath	36.8	(Singapore) Shannon Leong	37.5

=== Round 3 ===
Rank	Pool 1		Pool 2	
Rank	Athlete	Total	Athlete	Total
1	(Hong Kong) Grace Lau	43.0	(Japan) Hikaru Ono	43.3
2	(United States) Sakura Kokumai	41.6	(Turkey) Dilara Bozan	42.0
3	(Italy) Terryana D'Onofrio	41.1	(Spain) Paola García	41.8
4	(Vietnam) Nguyễn Thị Phương	39.7	(Iran) Mahsa Afsaneh	41.0
5	(Portugal) Ana Cruz	39.2	(Egypt) Aya Hesham	40.8
6	(Greece) Georgia Xenou	38.3	(Morocco) Aya En-Nesyry	40.2
7	(Hungary) Laura Sterck	38.0	(Czech Republic) Veronika Míšková	39.9
8	(Indonesia) Krisda Putri Aprilia	37.8	(Belgium) Chiara Manca	38.9

=== Finals ===
Final
(Hong Kong) Grace Lau	43.8
(Japan) Hikaru Ono	44.8

Bronze medal
(United States) Sakura Kokumai	42.2
(Spain) Paola García	43.1
(Italy) Terryana D'Onofrio	42.6
(Turkey) Dilara Bozan	41.2
