= Krisda Putri Aprilia =

Indonesian karateka (born 1999)

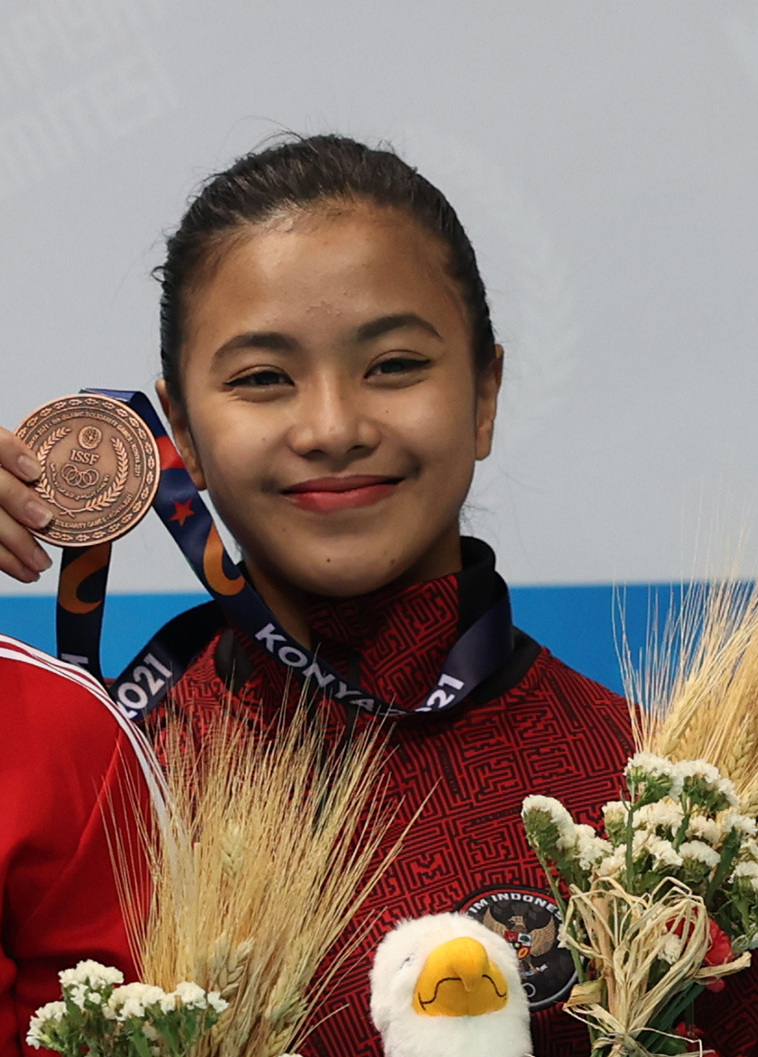

Personal information
- Born: 5 April 1999 (age 27) Makassar, South Sulawesi, Indonesia

Sport
- Country: Indonesia
- Sport: Karate
- Event: Kata
Medal record
Women's karate
Representing Indonesia
Asian Championships
Silver medal – second place	2021 Almaty	Individual kata
Karate1 Premier League
Silver medal – second place	2017 Dubai	Individual kata
Islamic Solidarity Games
Bronze medal – third place	2021 Konya	Individual kata
SEA Games
Gold medal – first place	2019 Philippines	Individual kata
Bronze medal – third place	2021 Vietnam	Individual kata
Bronze medal – third place	2023 Cambodia	Individual kata
Southeast Asian Championships
Gold medal – first place	2022 Phnom Penh	Individual kata
ASEAN University Games
Gold medal – first place	2022 Ubon Ratchathani	Individual kata

Krisda Putri Aprilia (5 April 1999) is an Indonesian karateka. She won the gold medal in the women's individual kata event at the 2019 SEA Games held in the Philippines. She also won the silver medal in her event at the 2021 Asian Karate Championships held in Almaty, Kazakhstan and a bronze medal at the 2021 Islamic Solidarity Games held in Konya, Turkey.

== Career ==
In June 2021, she competed at the World Olympic Qualification Tournament held in Paris, France hoping to qualify for the 2020 Summer Olympics in Tokyo, Japan. In November 2021, she competed in the women's individual kata event at the World Karate Championships held in Dubai, United Arab Emirates.

She won the silver medal in the women's individual kata event at the 2021 Asian Karate Championships held in Almaty, Kazakhstan. She won one of the bronze medals in the women's individual kata event at the 2021 Islamic Solidarity Games held in Konya, Turkey.

She lost her bronze medal match at the 2022 Asian Karate Championships held in Tashkent, Uzbekistan. In 2023, she competed in the women's kata event at the 2022 Asian Games held in Hangzhou, China. She also competed in the women's individual kata event at the World Karate Championships held in Budapest, Hungary.

== Achievements ==
Year	Competition	Venue	Rank	Event
2017	Karate1 Premier League	Dubai, United Arab Emirates	2nd	Individual kata
2019	SEA Games	Manila, Philippines	1st	Individual kata
2021	Asian Championships	Almaty, Kazakhstan	2nd	Individual kata
2022	Southeast Asian Championships	Phnom Penh, Cambodia	1st	Individual kata
2022	SEA Games	Hanoi, Vietnam	3rd	Individual kata
2022	ASEAN University Games	Ubon Ratchathani, Thailand	1st	Individual kata
2022	Islamic Solidarity Games	Konya, Turkey	3rd	Individual kata
2023	SEA Games	Phnom Penh, Cambodia	3rd	Individual kata
