= 2018 World Karate Championships – Women's individual kata =

Karate competition

Women's individual kata at the 2018 World Karate Championships
- Location: Madrid, Spain
- Dates: 6-10 November
- Competitors: 66

The preliminaries and repechages of the Women's individual kata competition at the 2018 World Karate Championships were held on November 6, 2018, and the finals on November 10, 2018.

== Results ==
=== Finals ===
Semi-finals
(Spain) Sandra Sánchez	5
(Hong Kong) Mo Sheung Grace Lau	0
(Italy) Viviana Bottaro	0
(Japan) Kiyou Shimizu	5

Final
(Spain) Sandra Sánchez	3
(Japan) Kiyou Shimizu	2

=== Repechage ===
Repechage round 1
(Costa Rica) Maria Jose Granados	0
(Dominican Republic) María Dimitrova	5
(India) Valena Valentina	0
(France) Alexandra Feracci	5

Repechage round 2
(Dominican Republic) María Dimitrova	4
(Slovakia) Ema Brazdova	1
(France) Alexandra Feracci	3
(Iran) Fatemeh Sadeghi	2

Repechage round 3
(Dominican Republic) María Dimitrova	5
(Canada) Rita Ngo	0
(France) Alexandra Feracci	5
(New Zealand) Alexandrea Anacan	0

Bronze medals
(Dominican Republic) María Dimitrova	1
(Hong Kong) Mo Sheung Grace Lau	4
(France) Alexandra Feracci	0
(Italy) Viviana Bottaro	5

=== Pool A ===
Preliminary round fights

	Score	
Patrícia Esparteiro (Portugal)	5–0	(Mexico) Cinthia de la Rue Villalpando

First round
(Portugal) Patrícia Esparteiro	1
(Hungary) Laura Sterck	4
(Romania) Alina Mihaela Guta	0
(Canada) Rita Ngo	5
(Finland) Bess Manty	2
(Macau) Sou Soi Lam	3
(Montenegro) Biserka Radulovic	5
(Wales) Kerrie Griffin	0
(Slovakia) Ema Brazdova	3
(North Macedonia) Puleksenija Jovanoska	2
(Malta) Kimberly Stanton	0
(El Salvador) Gabriella Izaguirre	5
(Namibia) Katelin Martin	0
(Dominican Republic) María Dimitrova	5
(Costa Rica) Maria Jose Granados Ramirez	0
(Spain) Sandra Sánchez	5

Second round
(Hungary) Laura Sterck	1
(Canada) Rita Ngo	4
(Macau) Sou Soi Lam	1
(Montenegro) Biserka Radulovic	4
(Slovakia) Ema Brazdova	5
(El Salvador) Gabriella Izaguirre	0
(Dominican Republic) María Dimitrova	0
(Spain) Sandra Sánchez	5

Third round
(Canada) Rita Ngo	3
(Montenegro) Biserka Radulovic	2
(Slovakia) Ema Brazdova	0
(Spain) Sandra Sánchez	5

Quarterfinals
(Canada) Rita Ngo	0
(Spain) Sandra Sánchez	5

=== Pool B ===
First round
(Mozambique) Irene Bechane	0
(Slovenia) Masa Simonic	5
(Chinese Taipei) Chien Hui-hsuan	3
(Guatemala) Nathalie Gabriela Barrera	2
(Republic of Ireland) Una Flynn	0
(Peru) Ingrid Aranda	5
(Hong Kong) Mo Sheung Grace Lau	5
(Moldova) Andrea Axenti	0
(Netherlands) Samantha van Lokven	0
(Turkey) Dilara Eltemur	5
(Austria) Kristin Wieninger	2
(Vietnam) Thi Phuong Nguyen	3
(Croatia) Vlatka Kiuk	5
(Liechtenstein) Aileen Sprenger	0
(Belarus) Maryia Fursava	0
(Egypt) Sarah Sayed	5

Second round
(Slovenia) Masa Simonic	0
(Chinese Taipei) Chien Hui-hsuan	5
(Peru) Ingrid Aranda	0
(Hong Kong) Mo Sheung Grace Lau	5
(Turkey) Dilara Eltemur	0
(Vietnam) Thi Phuong Nguyen	5
(Croatia) Vlatka Kiuk	0
(Egypt) Sarah Sayed	5

Third round
(Chinese Taipei) Chien Hui-hsuan	0
(Hong Kong) Mo Sheung Grace Lau	5
(Vietnam) Thi Phuong Nguyen	2
(Egypt) Sarah Sayed	3

Quarterfinals
(Hong Kong) Mo Sheung Grace Lau	5
(Egypt) Sarah Sayed	0

=== Pool C ===
Preliminary round fights

	Score	
Kenza Bellabes (Algeria)	0–5	(Denmark) Frederikke Bjerring

First round
(Denmark) Frederikke Bjerring	3
(Azerbaijan) Neda Rezaei	2
(Trinidad and Tobago) Chennise Charles	0
(Australia) Meezaan Dickinson	5
(Iceland) Svana Katla Thorsteinsdottir	0
(England) Natalie Payne	5
(Czech Republic) Veronika Miskova	4
(Indonesia) Nawar Kautsar Mastura	1
(Sweden) Mia Karlsson	5
(United Arab Emirates) Salama Alakrawi	0
(Thailand) Monsicha Tararattanakul	0
(United States) Sakura Kokumai	5
(Malaysia) Celine Xin Yi Lee	1
(Venezuela) Valerya Hernandez Moyeda	4
(South Korea) Wong Ada	0
(Italy) Viviana Bottaro	5

Second round
(Denmark) Frederikke Bjerring	3
(Australia) Meezaan Dickinson	2
(England) Natalie Payne	0
(Czech Republic) Veronika Miskova	5
(Sweden) Mia Karlsson	0
(United States) Sakura Kokumai	5
(Venezuela) Valerya Hernandez Moyeda	0
(Italy) Viviana Bottaro	5

Third round
(Denmark) Frederikke Bjerring	1
(Czech Republic) Veronika Miskova	4
(United States) Sakura Kokumai	0
(Italy) Viviana Bottaro	5

Quarterfinals
(Czech Republic) Veronika Miskova	1
(Italy) Viviana Bottaro	4

=== Pool D ===
First round
(Russia) Polina Kotlyarova	1
(New Zealand) Alexandrea Anacan	4
(Kazakhstan) Yevgeniya Akhmetova	2
(Serbia) Bojana Mladezic	3
(Switzerland) Melinda Mark	1
(Morocco) Sanae Agalmam	4
(Germany) Jasmin Jüttner	5
(Sri Lanka) Heshanee Hetti Arachchi	0
(Tunisia) Rim Mdaghi	0
(Iran) Fatemeh Sadeghi	5
(Kosovo) Vlerona Shala	2
(Scotland) Emma Ruthven	3
(Brazil) Nicole Mota	1
(France) Alexandra Feracci	4
(India) Valena Valentina	0
(Japan) Kiyou Shimizu	5

Second round
(New Zealand) Alexandrea Anacan	5
(Serbia) Bojana Mladezic	0
(Morocco) Sanae Agalmam	2
(Germany) Jasmin Jüttner	3
(Iran) Fatemeh Sadeghi	4
(Scotland) Emma Ruthven	1
(France) Alexandra Feracci	0
(Japan) Kiyou Shimizu	5

Third round
(New Zealand) Alexandrea Anacan	3
(Germany) Jasmin Jüttner	2
(Iran) Fatemeh Sadeghi	0
(Japan) Kiyou Shimizu	5

Quarterfinals
(New Zealand) Alexandrea Anacan	0
(Japan) Kiyou Shimizu	5
