= Karate at the 2022 World Games – Women's kata =

Women's kata at the 2022 World Games
- Venue: Bill Battle Coliseum
- Location: Birmingham, United States
- Dates: 8 July
- Competitors: 8 from 8 nations

Medalists
gold medal	Sandra Sánchez	Spain
silver medal	Hikaru Ono	Japan
bronze medal	Grace Lau	Hong Kong

The women's kata competition in karate at the 2022 World Games took place on 8 July 2022 at the Bill Battle Coliseum in Birmingham, United States.

== Results ==
=== Elimination round ===
==== Pool A ====
Pos	Athlete	B	W	L	PF	PA	(Japan)	(Hong Kong)	(United States)	(Egypt)
1	Hikaru Ono (JPN)	3	3	0	76.44	73.34	—	25.52	25.46	25.46
2	Grace Lau (HKG)	3	2	1	74.68	74.38	25.06	—	24.94	24.68
3	Sakura Kokumai (USA)	3	1	2	72.72	74.78	24.00	24.32	—	24.40
4	Aya Hesham (EGY)	3	0	3	73.20	74.54	24.28	24.54	24.38	—

Source: Birmingham 2022

==== Pool B ====
Pos	Athlete	B	W	L	PF	PA	(Spain)	(Italy)	(Germany)	(New Zealand)
1	Sandra Sánchez (ESP)	3	3	0	78.20	72.88	—	26.40	26.06	25.74
2	Carola Casale (ITA)	3	2	1	74.00	73.58	25.00	—	24.34	24.66
3	Jasmin Jüttner (GER)	3	1	2	72.40	74.12	24.34	23.60	—	24.46
4	Alexandrea Anacan (NZL)	3	0	3	70.84	74.86	23.54	23.58	23.72	—

Source: Birmingham 2022

=== Finals ===
Semi-finals
Carola Casale (ITA)	25.08
Hikaru Ono (JPN)	26.34
Grace Lau (HKG)	25.66
Sandra Sánchez (ESP)	26.92

Gold medal bout
Hikaru Ono (JPN)	27.00
Sandra Sánchez (ESP)	27.92
Bronze medal bout
Carola Casale (ITA)	25.54
Grace Lau (HKG)	26.28
