= Karate at the 2014 Asian Games – Women's kata =

Karate competition

Women's kata at the 2014 Asian Games
- Venue: Gyeyang Gymnasium
- Date: 2 October 2014
- Competitors: 9 from 9 nations

Medalists
gold medal	Kiyou Shimizu	Japan
silver medal	Nguyễn Hoàng Ngân	Vietnam
bronze medal	Bimala Tamang	Nepal
bronze medal	Cheung Pui Si	Macau

The women's individual kata competition at the 2014 Asian Games in Incheon, South Korea was held on 2 October 2014 at the Gyeyang Gymnasium.

A total of nine competitors from nine countries competed in this event.

== Schedule ==
All times are Korea Standard Time (UTC+09:00)

Date	Time	Event
Thursday, 2 October 2014	09:30	1/8 finals
Thursday, 2 October 2014	09:30	Quarterfinals
Thursday, 2 October 2014	09:30	Semifinals
Thursday, 2 October 2014	09:30	Final of repechage
Thursday, 2 October 2014	09:30	Finals

== Results ==
=== Main bracket ===
1/8 finals
Vanessa Taalaibek Kyzy (KGZ)	0
Nguyễn Hoàng Ngân (VIE)	5

Quarterfinals
Nguyễn Hoàng Ngân (VIE)	5
Kang Ji-ui (PRK)	0
Kulsoom Hazara (PAK)	1
Bimala Tamang (NEP)	4
Li Pui Ki (HKG)	0
Cheung Pui Si (MAC)	5
Kiyou Shimizu (JPN)	5
Sisilia Agustiani Ora (INA)	0

Semifinals
Nguyễn Hoàng Ngân (VIE)	5
Bimala Tamang (NEP)	0
Cheung Pui Si (MAC)	0
Kiyou Shimizu (JPN)	5

Final
Nguyễn Hoàng Ngân (VIE)	0
Kiyou Shimizu (JPN)	5

=== Repechage ===
Final of repechage
Vanessa Taalaibek Kyzy (KGZ)	2
Kang Ji-ui (PRK)	3

Bronze medal contest
Kang Ji-ui (PRK)	0
Bimala Tamang (NEP)	5
Sisilia Agustiani Ora (INA)	1
Cheung Pui Si (MAC)	4
