= Karate at the 2022 Asian Games – Women's kata =

Karate competition

Women's kata at the 2022 Asian Games
- Venue: Linping Sports Centre Gymnasium
- Date: 5 October 2023
- Competitors: 16 from 16 nations

Medalists
gold medal	Kiyou Shimizu	Japan
silver medal	Lovelly Anne Robberth	Malaysia
bronze medal	Sakura Alforte	Philippines
bronze medal	Grace Lau	Hong Kong

The women's individual kata event at the 2022 Asian Games took place on 5 October 2023 at Linping Sports Centre Gymnasium, Hangzhou, China.

== Schedule ==
All times are China Standard Time (UTC+08:00)

Date	Time	Event
Thursday, 5 October 2023	08:30	Round 1
Thursday, 5 October 2023	08:30	Round 2
Thursday, 5 October 2023	14:00	Finals

== Results ==
=== Round 1 ===
==== Pool 1 ====
Rank	Athlete	Score
1	Nguyễn Thị Phương (VIE)	38.9
2	Lovelly Anne Robberth (MAS)	38.6
3	Chien Hui-hsuan (TPE)	37.9
4	Sou Soi Lam (MAC)	36.1
5	Farhah Syahirah (BRU)	35.7
6	Manal Al-Zaid (KSA)	34.9
7	Milana Sagynbaeva (KGZ)	34.5
8	Heshani Hettiarachchi (SRI)	34.3

==== Pool 2 ====
Rank	Athlete	Score
1	Kiyou Shimizu (JPN)	42.6
2	Grace Lau (HKG)	41.7
3	Sakura Alforte (PHI)	40.0
4	Krisda Putri Aprilia (INA)	39.8
5	Monsicha Sakulrattanatara (THA)	39.2
6	Alisa Raskoti Magar (NEP)	37.3
7	That Chhenghorng (CAM)	36.8
8	Nu May Marma (BAN)	36.3

=== Round 2 ===
==== Pool 1 ====
Rank	Athlete	Score
1	Lovelly Anne Robberth (MAS)	40.4
2	Chien Hui-hsuan (TPE)	39.1
3	Nguyễn Thị Phương (VIE)	39.0
4	Sou Soi Lam (MAC)	37.1

==== Pool 2 ====
Rank	Athlete	Score
1	Kiyou Shimizu (JPN)	43.3
2	Grace Lau (HKG)	42.8
3	Sakura Alforte (PHI)	40.7
4	Krisda Putri Aprilia (INA)	39.3

=== Medal contests ===
==== Bronze medal match 1 ====
Rank	Athlete	Score
1	Sakura Alforte (PHI)	41.9
2	Chien Hui-hsuan (TPE)	41.3

==== Bronze medal match 2 ====
Rank	Athlete	Score
1	Grace Lau (HKG)	43.4
2	Nguyễn Thị Phương (VIE)	40.6

==== Gold medal contest ====
Rank	Athlete	Score
1	Kiyou Shimizu (JPN)	42.6
2	Lovelly Anne Robberth (MAS)	39.8
