= Karate at the 2023 Pan American Games – Women's individual kata =

Women's individual kata at the 2023 Pan American Games
- Venue: Contact Sports Center
- Dates: November 3
- Competitors: 8 from 8 nations

Medalists
| Gold medal | Sakura Kokumai | United States |
| Silver medal | Valentina Zapata | Colombia |
| Bronze medal | Claudia Laos-Loo | Canada |
| Bronze medal | Andrea Armada | Venezuela |

The women's individual kata competition of the karate events at the 2023 Pan American Games was held on November 3 at the Contact Sports Center (Centro de Entrenamiento de los Deportes de Contacto) in Santiago, Chile.

== Schedule ==
| Date | Time | Round |
|---|---|---|
| November 3, 2023 | 10:00 | Pool matches |
| November 3, 2023 | 16:00 | Final |

== Results ==
The athletes with the two best scores of each pool advance to the semifinals.

=== Pool A ===
| Rk | Athlete | Pld | W | L | Pts. |
|---|---|---|---|---|---|
| 1 | Valentina Zapata (COL) | 3 | 3 | 0 | 9 |
| 2 | Claudia Laos-Loo (CAN) | 3 | 1 | 2 | 3 |
| 3 | Andrea Armada (VEN) | 3 | 1 | 2 | 3 |
| 4 | Cristina Orbe (ECU) | 3 | 1 | 2 | 3 |

| | Score | |
|---|---|---|
| Andrea Armada (VEN) | 39.80–40.50 | Valentina Zapata (COL) |
| Cristina Orbe (ECU) | 38.30–39.60 | Claudia Laos-Loo (CAN) |
| Andrea Armada (VEN) | 38.00–38.90 | Cristina Orbe (ECU) |
| Valentina Zapata (COL) | 39.60–38.20 | Claudia Laos-Loo (CAN) |
| Valentina Zapata (COL) | 39.90–38.10 | Cristina Orbe (ECU) |
| Andrea Armada (VEN) | 39.20–38.10 | Claudia Laos-Loo (CAN) |

=== Pool B ===
| Rk | Athlete | Pld | W | L | Pts. |
|---|---|---|---|---|---|
| 1 | Sakura Kokumai (USA) | 3 | 3 | 0 | 9 |
| 2 | Nicole Yonamine (BRA) | 3 | 2 | 1 | 6 |
| 3 | Isidora Gallo (CHI) | 3 | 1 | 2 | 3 |
| 4 | María Dimitrova (DOM) | 3 | 0 | 3 | 0 |

| | Score | |
|---|---|---|
| Nicole Yonamine (BRA) | – | María Dimitrova (DOM) (WDR) |
| Isidora Gallo (CHI) | 37.80–40.30 | Sakura Kokumai (USA) |
| Nicole Yonamine (BRA) | 39.30–38.10 | Isidora Gallo (CHI) |
| María Dimitrova (DOM) (WDR) | – | Sakura Kokumai (USA) |
| María Dimitrova (DOM) (WDR) | – | Isidora Gallo (CHI) |
| Nicole Yonamine (BRA) | 39.70–41.30 | Sakura Kokumai (USA) |

=== Finals ===
The results were as follows:

| Gold medal match |
| Valentina Zapata (COL) | 39.40 |
| Sakura Kokumai (USA) | 41.10 |

Bronze medal match
Isidora Gallo (CHI) | 39.10
Claudia Laos-Loo (CAN) | 40.10
Bronze medal match
Andrea Armada (VEN) | 40.30
Nicole Yonamine (BRA) | 40.20
