= 2021 World Karate Championships – Women's individual kata =

World Karate Championship

Women's individual kata at the 2021 World Karate Championships
- Venue: Hamdan Sports Complex
- Location: Dubai, United Arab Emirates
- Dates: 18–20 November
- Competitors: 58 from 58 nations

Medalists
gold medal	Sandra Sánchez	Spain
silver medal	Hikaru Ono	Japan
bronze medal	Grace Lau	Hong Kong
bronze medal	Viviana Bottaro	Italy

The Women's individual kata competition at the 2021 World Karate Championships was held from 18 to 20 November 2021.

== Results ==
=== Round 1 ===
Rank	Pool 1		Pool 2		Pool 3		Pool 4	
Rank	Athlete	Total	Athlete	Total	Athlete	Total	Athlete	Total
1	(United States) Sakura Kokumai	25.42	(Hong Kong) Grace Lau	24.94	(Japan) Hikaru Ono	26.00	(Brazil) Nicole Mota	24.08
2	(France) Helvétia Taily	24.34	(Romania) Diana Turcu	23.48	(Germany) Jasmin Jüttner	24.68	(North Macedonia) Puleksenija Jovanovska	23.86
3	(Chinese Taipei) Chien Hui-hsuan	24.22	(India) Priyanka Rami	23.06	(Canada) Rita Ha Thi Ngo	23.62	(Ecuador) Cristina Orbe	23.80
4	(England) Natalie Payne	22.46	(Algeria) Manal Kamilia Hadj Saïd	23.00	(Greece) Georgia Xenou	22.94	(Morocco) Aya En-Nesyry	23.12
5	(Serbia) Bojana Mladežić	22.28	(Bosnia and Herzegovina) Isidora Borovčanin	21.16	(El Salvador) Gabriela Izaguirre	21.96	(Chile) Carol de la Paz	22.94
6	(Croatia) Sara Malčec	21.38	(Poland) Eliza Gaweł	20.94	(Singapore) Shannon Leong	21.00	(South Africa) Candice Leslie	19.66
7	(Kuwait) Yasmeen Al-Mutawa	20.80	(Saudi Arabia) Manal Al-Zaid	20.08	(Saint Lucia) Kara-Lee Emmanuel	16.66	(Oman) Hawra Al-Lawati	18.00
8	(Cameroon) Sylvie Ambani	19.62						
Rank	Pool 5		Pool 6		Pool 7		Pool 8	
Rank	Athlete	Total	Athlete	Total	Athlete	Total	Athlete	Total
1	(Philippines) Sarah Kamijo Pangilinan	24.94	(Italy) Viviana Bottaro	26.34	(Turkey) Damla Su Türemen	24.40	(Spain) Sandra Sánchez	27.20
2	(Czech Republic) Veronika Míšková	24.20	(Egypt) Aya Hesham	24.68	Krisda Putri Aprilia	23.74	(Peru) Ingrid Aranda	23.80
3	(Slovakia) Jana Vaňušaniková	23.40	(Portugal) Patrícia Esparteiro	24.00	(Kazakhstan) Liya Koshkarbayeva	23.74	(Austria) Kristin Wieninger	22.82
4	Anna Shcherbina	22.98	(Mexico) Cinthia de la Rue	22.66	(Venezuela) Andrea Armada	22.96	(Belarus) Maryia Fursava	22.12
5	(Belgium) Chiara Manca	22.20	(Uzbekistan) Rakhshona Panjieva	20.26	(Montenegro) Biserka Radulović	22.86	(Switzerland) Melinda Mark	21.94
6	(Hungary) Laura Sterck	22.16	(United Arab Emirates) Hamida Haji Jafari	20.20	(Dominican Republic) Sasha Rodríguez	21.92	(Denmark) Josephine Christiansen	20.78
7	(Ukraine) Kristina Vienik	21.38	(Kenya) Kanini Muli		(Bangladesh) Nu Marma	21.48	(Republic of Ireland) Eimear Porter	19.82
8	(Turkmenistan) Bagul Veliyeva	18.32						

=== Round 2 ===
Rank	Pool 1		Pool 2		Pool 3		Pool 4	
Rank	Athlete	Total	Athlete	Total	Athlete	Total	Athlete	Total
1	(Hong Kong) Grace Lau	25.30	(Japan) Hikaru Ono	25.86	(Italy) Viviana Bottaro	26.22	(Spain) Sandra Sánchez	27.14
2	(Chinese Taipei) Chien Hui-hsuan	24.54	(Canada) Rita Ha Thi Ngo	25.40	(Egypt) Aya Hesham	25.20	(Turkey) Damla Su Türemen	24.68
3	(United States) Sakura Kokumai	24.42	(Germany) Jasmin Jüttner	24.66	(Czech Republic) Veronika Míšková	24.62	(Peru) Ingrid Aranda	24.46
4	(France) Helvétia Taily	24.14	(Ecuador) Cristina Orbe	24.66	(Philippines) Sarah Kamijo Pangilinan	24.46	(Venezuela) Andrea Armada	23.88
5	(England) Natalie Payne	23.22	(Brazil) Nicole Mota	24.52	(Portugal) Patrícia Esparteiro	24.24	(Belarus) Maryia Fursava	23.40
6	(Romania) Diana Turcu	23.12	(North Macedonia) Puleksenija Jovanovska	24.18	Anna Shcherbina	23.58	(Kazakhstan) Liya Koshkarbayeva	23.26
7	(Algeria) Manal Kamilia Hadj Saïd	22.80	(Morocco) Aya En-Nesyry	23.22	(Mexico) Cinthia de la Rue	23.38	Krisda Putri Aprilia	23.14
8	(India) Priyanka Rami	22.32	(Greece) Georgia Xenou	22.60	(Slovakia) Jana Vaňušaniková	23.20	(Austria) Kristin Wieninger	22.52

=== Round 3 ===
Rank	Pool 1		Pool 2	
Rank	Athlete	Total	Athlete	Total
1	(Japan) Hikaru Ono	27.48	(Spain) Sandra Sánchez	27.92
2	(Hong Kong) Grace Lau	25.82	(Italy) Viviana Bottaro	26.46
3	(United States) Sakura Kokumai	25.60	(Egypt) Aya Hesham	24.80
4	(Germany) Jasmin Jüttner	24.86	(Peru) Ingrid Aranda	24.32
5	(Chinese Taipei) Chien Hui-hsuan	24.32	(Czech Republic) Veronika Míšková	23.94
6	(Canada) Rita Ha Thi Ngo	24.28	(Turkey) Damla Su Türemen	23.94
7	(France) Helvétia Taily	23.72	(Venezuela) Andrea Armada	23.66
8	(Ecuador) Cristina Orbe	23.54	(Philippines) Sarah Kamijo Pangilinan	22.86

=== Finals ===
Final
(Japan) Hikaru Ono	27.42
(Spain) Sandra Sánchez	28.46

Bronze medal
(Hong Kong) Grace Lau	25.96
(Egypt) Aya Hesham	25.00
(United States) Sakura Kokumai	26.20
(Italy) Viviana Bottaro	26.66
