= Patrícia Esparteiro =

Portuguese karateka (born 1994)

Personal information
- Born: 24 May 1994 (age 32)

Sport
- Country: Portugal
- Sport: Karate
- Events: Individual kata; Team kata
Medal record
Women's karate
Representing Portugal
European Championships
Bronze medal – third place	2011 Zürich	Individual kata
Bronze medal – third place	2019 Guadalajara	Team kata
Bronze medal – third place	2021 Poreč	Team kata
European Games
Bronze medal – third place	2019 Minsk	Individual kata

Patrícia Esparteiro (born 24 May 1994) is a Portuguese karateka. She is a two-time bronze medalist in the women's team kata event at the European Karate Championships. She also won bronze in the individual kata event at this competition in 2011.

Esparteiro also represented Portugal at the 2019 European Games in Minsk, Belarus and she won one of the bronze medals in the women's individual kata event.

== Career ==
Esparteiro competed in the women's individual kata event at the 2018 World Karate Championships held in Madrid, Spain.

In 2019, Esparteiro represented Portugal at the European Games in Minsk, Belarus and she won one of the bronze medals in the women's individual kata event. In 2019, she also competed in the women's individual kata event at the World Beach Games held in Doha, Qatar without winning a medal.

In May 2021, Esparteiro won one of the bronze medals in the women's team kata event at the European Karate Championships held in Poreč, Croatia. In June 2021, she competed at the World Olympic Qualification Tournament held in Paris, France hoping to qualify for the 2020 Summer Olympics in Tokyo, Japan. In November 2021, she competed in the women's individual kata event at the World Karate Championships held in Dubai, United Arab Emirates.

== Achievements ==
Year	Competition	Venue	Rank	Event
2011	European Championships	Zürich, Switzerland	3rd	Individual kata
2019	European Championships	Guadalajara, Spain	3rd	Team kata
2019	European Games	Minsk, Belarus	3rd	Individual kata
2021	European Championships	Poreč, Croatia	3rd	Team kata
