= Kiyou Shimizu =

Japanese karateka (born 1993)

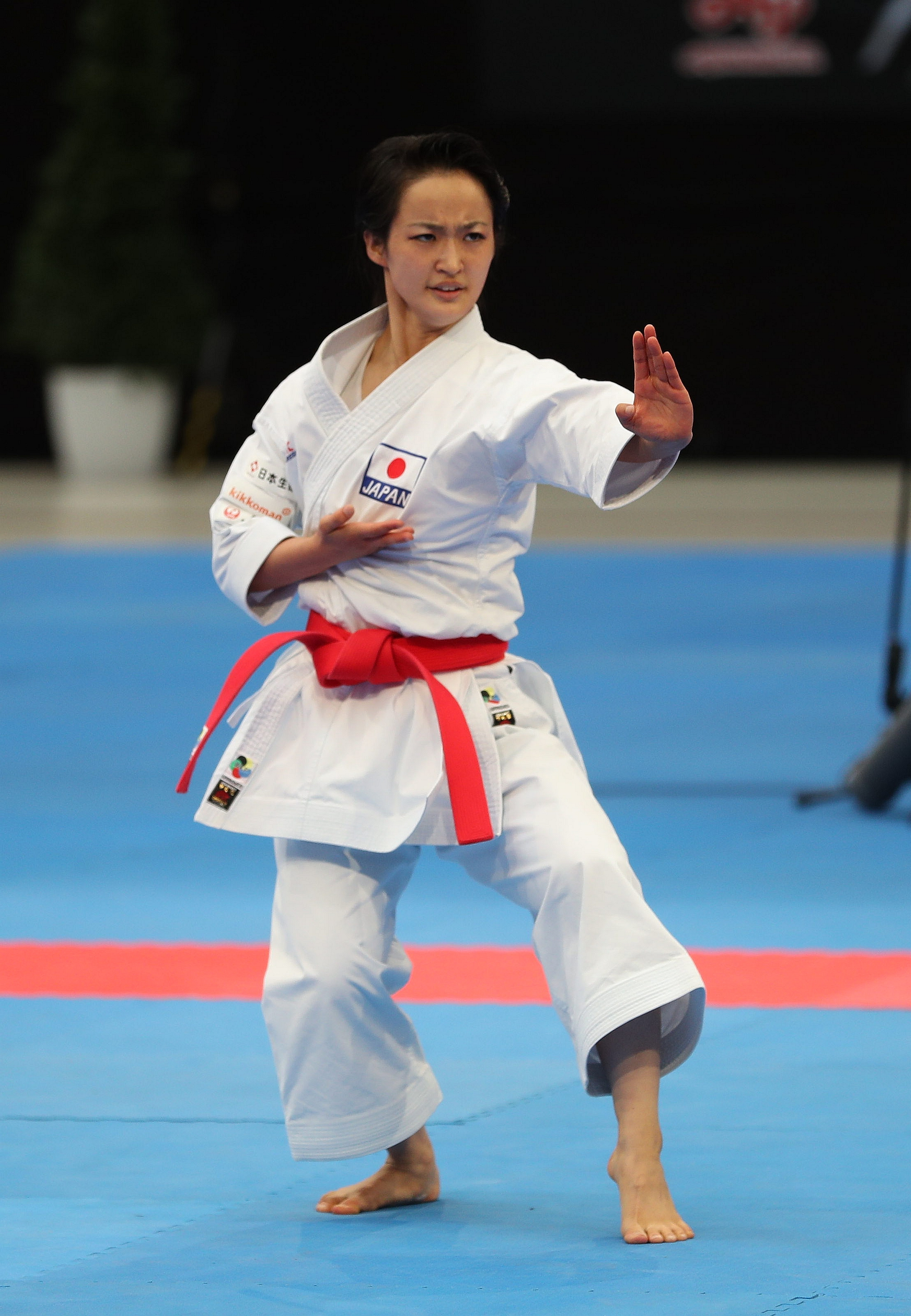
- Shimizu in 2018

Personal information
- Native name: 清水希容
- Born: 7 December 1993 (age 32) Osaka, Japan

Sport
- Country: Japan
- Sport: Karate
- Rank: 3rd
- Event: Individual kata
- University team: Kansai University
Medal record
Women's karate
Representing Japan
Olympic Games
Silver medal – second place	2020 Tokyo	Individual kata
World Championships
Gold medal – first place	2014 Bremen	Individual kata
Gold medal – first place	2016 Linz	Individual kata
Silver medal – second place	2018 Madrid	Individual kata
Asian Games
Gold medal – first place	2014 Incheon	Individual kata
Gold medal – first place	2018 Jakarta	Individual kata
Gold medal – first place	2022 Hangzhou	Individual kata
Asian Championships
Gold medal – first place	2015 Yokohama	Individual kata
Gold medal – first place	2018 Amman	Individual kata
Gold medal – first place	2019 Tashkent	Individual kata
Silver medal – second place	2023 Malacca	Individual kata
World Games
Gold medal – first place	2017 Wrocław	Individual kata

Kiyou Shimizu (清水希容, Shimizu Kiyō, born 7 December 1993) is a Japanese karateka competing in the women's kata event. She won the silver medal in the women's kata event at the 2020 Summer Olympics in Tokyo, Japan. Shimizu is also a two-time gold medalist at the World Karate Championships and a three-time gold medalist at the Asian Games.

== Career ==
In 2014, Shimizu represented Japan at the Asian Games in Incheon, South Korea, and she won the gold medal in the women's kata event. A month later, she became world champion in this event at the 2014 World Karate Championships held in Bremen, Germany. In 2015, she won the gold medal in this event at the Asian Karate Championships held in Yokohama, Japan.

At the 2016 World Karate Championships in Linz, Austria, Shimizu repeated her 2014 success by winning the gold medal in the women's kata event for the second time. In 2017, she won the gold medal in the women's kata event at the World Games held in Wrocław, Poland. In the final, she defeated Sandra Sánchez of Spain.

In 2018, Shimizu won a medal in three major tournaments. At the 2018 Asian Karate Championships held in Amman, Jordan, she won the gold medal in the women's kata event. She also won the gold medal in the women's kata event at the Asian Games held in Jakarta, Indonesia. Her success continued at the World Karate Championships held in Madrid, Spain where she won the silver medal in the women's individual kata event. In the final, she lost against Sandra Sánchez of Spain.

At the 2019 Asian Karate Championships held in Tashkent, Uzbekistan, Shimizu won the gold medal in the women's individual kata event.

Shimizu represented Japan at the 2020 Summer Olympics in karate. She reached the final in the women's kata event, but lost the gold medal bout to Spain's Sandra Sánchez Jamie.

In 2023, Shimizu won the silver medal in her event at the Asian Karate Championships held in Malacca, Malaysia. She won the gold medal in the women's kata event at the 2022 Asian Games held in Hangzhou, China.

== Personal life ==
She studied at Kansai University.

== Achievements ==
Year	Competition	Venue	Rank	Event
2014	Asian Games	Incheon, South Korea	1st	Individual kata
2014	World Championships	Bremen, Germany	1st	Individual kata
2015	Asian Championships	Yokohama, Japan	1st	Individual kata
2016	World Championships	Linz, Austria	1st	Individual kata
2017	World Games	Wrocław, Poland	1st	Individual kata
2018	Asian Championships	Amman, Jordan	1st	Individual kata
2018	Asian Games	Jakarta, Indonesia	1st	Individual kata
2018	World Championships	Madrid, Spain	2nd	Individual kata
2019	Asian Championships	Tashkent, Uzbekistan	1st	Individual kata
2021	Summer Olympics	Tokyo, Japan	2nd	Individual kata
2023	Asian Championships	Malacca, Malaysia	2nd	Individual kata
2023	Asian Games	Hangzhou, China	1st	Individual kata
