= Karate at the 2014 Pan American Sports Festival =

Karate competition

The karate competition at the 2014 Pan American Sports Festival was held in Tlaxcala, Mexico. The tournament was held from 21–27 July at the Pabellón Comercial Centro Expositor "Adolfo López Mateos".

== Medal summary ==
=== Men's events ===
Event	Gold	Silver	Bronze
Under 60kg	Giovanni Martínez (VEN)	Edemilson Guts (BRA)	Andrés Rendón (COL); Arturo Estrada (MEX)
Under 67kg	José Ramírez (COL)	Vinicius Rezende (BRA)	Arash Beytoei (CAN); Julian Pinzas (ARG)
Under 75kg	Dionicio Gustavo (DOM)	Franco Icasati (ARG)	Sebastián Rendón (COL); Aaron Pérez (ESA)
Under 84kg	Jorge Merino (ESA)	Cesar Herrera (VEN)	Emerick Rogerio (BRA); Philippe Soucy (CAN)
Over 84kg	Franco Recouso (ARG)	Alejandro Mellado (CHI)	Anel Castillo (DOM); Diego Rodríguez (MEX)
Kata	Antonio Díaz (VEN)	Gakuji Tozaki (USA)	Leonardo Cano (ARG); Andrés Tejada (ECU)

=== Women's events ===
Event	Gold	Silver	Bronze
Under 50kg	Tyler Wolfe (USA)	Cecilia Cuellar (MEX)	Paula de Souza (BRA); Cheili González (GUA)
Under 55kg	Valeria Kumizaki (BRA)	Vanessa Restrepo (CAN)	Génesis Navarrete (VEN); Ana Villanueva (DOM)
Under 61kg	Kamille Desjardins (CAN)	Franyerlin Brito (VEN)	Erica Castro (BRA); Daniela Lepin (CHI)
Under 68kg	Valeria Evecher (ECU)	Xhunashi Caballero (MEX)	Cheryl Murphy (USA); Omaira Molina (VEN)
Over 68kg	Sayaka Osorio (COL)	Isabela dos Santos (BRA)	Verónica Lugo (ARG); Ana Mendoza (MEX)
Kata	Sakura Kokumai (USA)	Xatzi Trujillo (MEX)	Elaine Martínez (VEN); Suanny Guadalupe (ECU)
