= Karate at the 2018 Asian Games – Women's kata =

Karate competition

Women's kata at the 2018 Asian Games
- Venue: Jakarta Convention Center
- Date: 25 August 2018
- Competitors: 11 from 11 nations

Medalists
gold medal	Kiyou Shimizu	Japan
silver medal	Sou Soi Lam	Macau
bronze medal	Monsicha Tararattanakul	Thailand
bronze medal	Grace Lau	Hong Kong

The women's individual kata event at the 2018 Asian Games took place on 25 August 2018 at Jakarta Convention Center Plenary Hall, Jakarta, Indonesia.

== Schedule ==
All times are Western Indonesia Time (UTC+07:00)

Date	Time	Event
Saturday, 25 August 2018	09:00	1/8 finals
Saturday, 25 August 2018	09:00	Quarterfinals
Saturday, 25 August 2018	09:00	Semifinals
Saturday, 25 August 2018	09:00	Final of repechage
Saturday, 25 August 2018	12:00	Finals

== Results ==
=== Main bracket ===
1/8 finals
Celine Lee (MAS)	5
Wahidah Kamarul Zaman (BRU)	0
Sou Soi Lam (MAC)	5
Chanchala Danuwar (NEP)	0
Nguyễn Thị Phương (VIE)	3
Nawar Kautsar Mastura (INA)	2

Quarterfinals
Celine Lee (MAS)	2
Monsicha Tararattanakul (THA)	3
Sou Soi Lam (MAC)	5
Kang Ji-ui (PRK)	0
Nguyễn Thị Phương (VIE)	1
Grace Lau (HKG)	4
Kiyou Shimizu (JPN)	5
Ada Wong (KOR)	0

Semifinals
Monsicha Tararattanakul (THA)	1
Sou Soi Lam (MAC)	4
Grace Lau (HKG)	2
Kiyou Shimizu (JPN)	3

Final
Sou Soi Lam (MAC)	0
Kiyou Shimizu (JPN)	5

=== Repechage ===
Final of repechage
Chanchala Danuwar (NEP)	3
Kang Ji-ui (PRK)	2

Bronze medals
Chanchala Danuwar (NEP)	0
Monsicha Tararattanakul (THA)	5
Ada Wong (KOR)	0
Grace Lau (HKG)	5
