= Grace Lau =

Hong Kong karateka (born 1991)

Grace Lau Mo-sheung
Personal information
- Native name: 劉慕裳
- Born: 19 October 1991 (age 35)

Sport
- Country: Hong Kong
- Sport: Karate
- Rank: 1st
- Event: Individual kata
Medal record
Women's karate
Representing Hong Kong
Olympic Games
Bronze medal – third place	2020 Tokyo	Individual kata
World Championships
Gold medal – first place	2025 Cairo	Individual kata
Silver medal – second place	2023 Budapest	Individual kata
Bronze medal – third place	2018 Madrid	Individual kata
Bronze medal – third place	2021 Dubai	Individual kata
World Games
Gold medal – first place	2025 Chengdu	Individual kata
Bronze medal – third place	2022 Birmingham	Individual kata
Asian Games
Silver medal – second place	2026 Aichi-Nagoya	Individual kata
Bronze medal – third place	2018 Jakarta	Individual kata
Bronze medal – third place	2022 Hangzhou	Individual kata
Asian Championships
Gold medal – first place	2023 Malacca	Individual kata
Gold medal – first place	2024 Hangzhou	Individual kata
Gold medal – first place	2025 Tashkent	Individual kata
Silver medal – second place	2015 Yokohama	Individual kata
Silver medal – second place	2019 Tashkent	Individual kata
Silver medal – second place	2022 Tashkent	Individual kata
Silver medal – second place	2026 Bali	Individual kata
Bronze medal – third place	2018 Amman	Individual kata
Bronze medal – third place	2021 Almaty	Individual kata
World Beach Games
Bronze medal – third place	2019 Doha	Individual kata

Grace Lau Mo-sheung (Chinese: 劉慕裳; born 19 October 1991) is a Hong Kong karateka. She won bronze in the women's kata event at the 2020 Summer Olympics in Tokyo, Japan, becoming the first Hong Kong athlete to win an Olympic medal in karate. She is a four-time medallist, including gold, in the women's individual kata event at the World Karate Championships. She is also a medallist in this event at the Asian Games and the World Beach Games. She is a nine-time medalist, including three gold medals, at the Asian Karate Championships.

== Career ==
Lau won the silver medal in the women's kata event at the 2015 Asian Karate Championships held in Yokohama, Japan. In 2018, she won one of the bronze medals in the women's kata event at the 2018 Asian Games held in Jakarta, Indonesia. Later that year, she also won one of the bronze medals in the women's kata event at the 2018 World Karate Championships held in Madrid, Spain.

Lau won a medal at the Asian Karate Championships in 2015, 2018 and 2019. At the 2019 Asian Karate Championships held in Tashkent, Uzbekistan, she won the silver medal in the women's individual kata event.

In 2020, Lau qualified to represent Hong Kong at the 2020 Summer Olympics in Tokyo, Japan. She defeated Dilara Bozan of Turkey with a score of 26.94 and won the bronze medal in the women's kata event. She was also the flag bearer for Hong Kong during the closing ceremony. A few months after the Olympics, she won one of the bronze medals in the women's individual kata event at the 2021 World Karate Championships held in Dubai, United Arab Emirates. A month later, she won one of the bronze medals in her event at the Asian Karate Championships held in Almaty, Kazakhstan.

Lau won the bronze medal in the women's kata event at the 2022 World Games held in Birmingham, United States.

In July 2023, Lau won the gold medal in her event at the Asian Karate Championships held in Malacca, Malaysia. In October 2023, she won one of the bronze medals in the women's kata event at the 2022 Asian Games held in Hangzhou, China. In the same month, she won the silver medal in the women's individual kata event at the 2023 World Karate Championships held in Budapest, Hungary.

Lau won the gold medal in the women's kata event at the 2025 World Games held in Chengdu, China.

In November 2025, Lau won the gold medal in the women's individual kata event at the 2025 World Karate Championships held in Cairo, Egypt.

== Achievements ==
Year	Competition	Venue	Rank	Event
2015	Asian Championships	Yokohama, Japan	2nd	Individual kata
2018	Asian Championships	Amman, Jordan	3rd	Individual kata
2018	Asian Games	Jakarta, Indonesia	3rd	Individual kata
2018	World Championships	Madrid, Spain	3rd	Individual kata
2019	Asian Championships	Tashkent, Uzbekistan	2nd	Individual kata
2019	World Beach Games	Doha, Qatar	3rd	Individual kata
2021	Summer Olympics	Tokyo, Japan	3rd	Individual kata
2021	World Championships	Dubai, United Arab Emirates	3rd	Individual kata
2021	Asian Championships	Almaty, Kazakhstan	3rd	Individual kata
2022	World Games	Birmingham, United States	3rd	Individual kata
2022	Asian Championships	Tashkent, Uzbekistan	2nd	Individual kata
2023	Asian Championships	Malacca, Malaysia	1st	Individual kata
2023	Asian Games	Hangzhou, China	3rd	Individual kata
2023	World Championships	Budapest, Hungary	2nd	Individual kata
2024	Asian Championships	Hangzhou, China	1st	Individual kata
2025	Asian Championships	Tashkent, Uzbekistan	1st	Individual kata
2025	World Games	Chengdu, China	1st	Individual kata
2025	World Championships	Cairo, Egypt	1st	Individual kata
2026	Asian Championships	Bali, Indonesia	2nd	Individual kata
2026	Asian Games	Aichi and Nagoya, Japan	2nd	Individual kata

== Filmography ==
=== Film ===
Year	Title	Notes/Ref.
2017	The Empty Hands	Cameo

=== Drama ===
Year	Title	Platform	Notes/Ref.
2024	Warriors Within 2	ViuTV	Ep.4
