= Swimming at the 2022 ASEAN University Games =

Swimming competition

- Venue: Ban Yang Noi Campus

The swimming competition at the 2022 ASEAN University Games will be held in Ubon Ratchathani, Thailand in Ban Yang Noi Campus.

2022 ASEAN University Games officially the 20th ASEAN University Games and also known as Ubon Ratchathani 2022 is a regional multi-sport event currently held from 26 July to 6 August 2022 in Ubon Ratchathani, Thailand. Originally planned to take place from 13 to 22 December 2020, it was eventually rescheduled as a result of the COVID-19 pandemic.

== Medal table ==
* Host nation (Thailand)

2022 ASEAN University Games medal table
| Rank | Nation | Gold | Silver | Bronze | Total |
|---|---|---|---|---|---|
| 1 | Thailand* | 13 | 10 | 9 | 32 |
| 2 | Indonesia | 10 | 13 | 15 | 38 |
| 3 | Malaysia | 6 | 11 | 10 | 27 |
| 4 | Singapore | 5 | 5 | 2 | 12 |
| 5 | Philippines | 4 | 0 | 1 | 5 |
| Totals (5 entries) | | 38 | 39 | 37 | 114 |

== Medalists ==
=== Men ===
| Event | Gold | | Silver | | Bronze | |
|---|---|---|---|---|---|---|
| 50 m freestyle | Joe Aditya Wijaya Kurniawan; Indonesia | 23.71 | Dulyawat Kaewsriyong; Thailand | 23.85 | Erick Ahmad Fathoni; Indonesia | 23.87 |
| 100 m freestyle | Welson Sim; Malaysia | 51.15 | Joe Aditya Wijaya Kurniawan; Indonesia | 51.63 | Terence Ng Shin Jian; Malaysia | 52.10 |
| 200 m freestyle | Joe Aditya Wijaya Kurniawan; Indonesia | 1:52.08 | Welson Sim; Malaysia | 1:52.44 | Terence Ng Shin Jian; Malaysia | 1:53.44 |
| 400 m freestyle | Low Zheng Yong; Malaysia | 3:59.57 | Nicholas Karel Subagyo; Indonesia | 4:01.85 | Welson Sim; Malaysia | 4:07.29 |
| 1500 m freestyle | Sebastian Soon; Malaysia | 15:55.92 | Welson Sim; Malaysia | 16:16.11 | Nicholas Karel Subagyo; Indonesia | 16:21.16 |
| 50 m backstroke | Pooncharat Punnaprasart; Thailand | 26.23 | Farrel Armandio Tangkas; Indonesia | 26.94 | Andi Muhammad Nurrizka Febrianto; Indonesia | 27.49 |
| 100 m backstroke | Farrel Armandio Tangkas; Indonesia | 57.48 | Pooncharat Punnaprasart; Thailand | 57.93 | Donovan Lee Chuen Jin; Singapore | 58.60 |
| 200 m backstroke | Farrel Armandio Tangkas; Indonesia | 2:05.55 | Donovan Lee Chuen Jin; Singapore | 2:06.57 | Pooncharat Punnaprasart; Thailand | 2:06.74 |
| 50 m breaststroke | Christopher Cheong Ee Hong; Singapore | 28.83 | Hii Puong Wei; Malaysia | 28.99 | Andi Muhammad Nurrizka Febrianto; Indonesia | 29.08 |
| 100 m breaststroke | Pande Made Iron Digjaya; Indonesia | 1:03.72 | Thanonchai Janruksa; Thailand | 1:03.80 | Ng Jing Fu; Malaysia | 1:04.84 |
| 200 m breaststroke | Pande Made Iron Digjaya; Indonesia | 2:20.55 | Andi Muhammad Nurrizka Febrianto; Indonesia | 2:21.48 | Peerapat Klongkarnpanich; Thailand | 2:21.78 |
| 50 m butterfly | Navaphat Wongcharoen; Thailand | 24.79 | Ng Tze Xiang; Malaysia | 24.82 | Joe Aditya Wijaya Kurniawan; Indonesia | 25.05 |
| 100 m butterfly | Navaphat Wongcharoen; Thailand | 54.06 | Joe Aditya Wijaya Kurniawan; Indonesia | 54.62 | Ng Tze Xiang; Malaysia | 55.25 |
| 200 m butterfly | Navaphat Wongcharoen; Thailand | 2:01.63 | Joe Aditya Wijaya Kurniawan; Indonesia | 2:02.34 | Low Zheng Yong; Malaysia | 2:02.60 |
| 200 m individual medley | Dulyawat Kaewsriyong; Thailand | 2:05.42 | Hii Puong Wei; Malaysia | 2:06.22 | Erick Ahmad Fathoni; Indonesia | 2:09.44 |
| 400 m individual medley | Sebastian Soon; Malaysia | 4:32.27 | Low Zheng Yong; Malaysia | 4:34.27 | Dulyawat Kaewsriyong; Thailand | 4:43.27 |
| 4 × 100 m freestyle relay | Indonesia; Erick Ahmad Fathoni; Joe Aditya Wijaya Kurniawan; Nicholas Karel Subagyo; Farrel Armandio Tangkas | 3:27.54 | Malaysia; Hii Puong Wei; Terence Ng Shin Jian; Ng Tze Xiang; Welson Sim | 3:28.16 | Thailand; Dulyawat Kaewsriyong; Natthapat Nantapang; Preuthinun Pittakulsiri; Navaphat Wongcharoen | 3:31.75 |
| 4 × 200 m freestyle relay | Malaysia; Low Zheng Yong; Terence Ng Shin Jian; Welson Sim; Sebastian Soon | 7:32.34 | Indonesia; Erick Ahmad Fathoni; Joe Aditya Wijaya Kurniawan; Nicholas Karel Subagyo; Farrel Armandio Tangkas | 7:32.73 | Thailand; Ratchapum Chailangka; Tanakrit Kittiya; Ratthawit Thammananthachote; Siradanai Yanu | 8:04.04 |
| 4 × 100 m medley relay | Thailand; Thanonchai Janruksa; Dulyawat Kaewsriyong; Pooncharat Punnaprasart; Navaphat Wongcharoen | 3:45.65 | Indonesia; Pande Made Iron Digjaya; Erick Ahmad Fathoni; Joe Aditya Wijaya Kurniawan; Farrel Armandio Tangkas | 3:46.18 | Malaysia; Hii Puong Wei; Ng Jing Fu; Ng Tze Xiang; Welson Sim | 3:54.88 |

=== Women ===
| Event | Gold | | Silver | | Bronze | |
|---|---|---|---|---|---|---|
| 50 m freestyle | Marina Chan; Singapore | 26.09 | Jenjira Srisaard; Thailand | 26.12 | Chloe Isleta; Philippines | 26.31 |
| 100 m freestyle | Marina Chan; Singapore | 57.17 | Chan Zi Yi; Singapore | 57.61 | Kornkarnjana Sapianchai; Thailand | 58.01 |
| 200 m freestyle | Kornkarnjana Sapianchai; Thailand | 2:04.98 | Chan Zi Yi; Singapore | 2:05.13 | Angel Gabriella Yus; Indonesia | 2:05.86 |
| 400 m freestyle | Chan Zi Yi; Singapore | 4:27.58 | Goh Chia Tong; Malaysia | 4:28.51 | Prada Hanan Farmadini; Indonesia | 4:28.68 |
| 800 m freestyle | Prada Hanan Farmadini; Indonesia | 9:15.41 | Chan Zi Yi; Singapore | 9:16.92 | Panthira Subha-amorn; Thailand | 9:19.63 |
| 50 m backstroke | Chloe Isleta; Philippines | 29.57 | Angel Gabriella Yus; Indonesia | 29.83 | Anak Agung Istri Kania Ratih Atmaja; Indonesia | 30.19 |
| 100 m backstroke | Chloe Isleta; Philippines | 1:02.70 | Fonpray Yamsuan; Thailand | 1:05.97 | Azzahra Permatahani; Indonesia | 1:06.31 |
| 200 m backstroke | Chloe Isleta; Philippines | 2:17.36 | Fonpray Yamsuan; Thailand | 2:19.27 | Azzahra Permatahani; Indonesia | 2:23.91 |
| 50 m breaststroke | Jenjira Srisaard; Thailand | 32.25 | Saovanee Boonamphai; Thailand | 33.18 | Nurita Monica Sari; Indonesia | 33.93 |
| 100 m breaststroke | Phiangkhwan Pawapotako; Thailand | 1:12.68 | Saovanee Boonamphai; Thailand | 1:13.88 | Azzahra Permatahani; Indonesia | 1:13.99 |
| 200 m breaststroke | Phiangkhwan Pawapotako; Thailand | 2:36.78 | Azzahra Permatahani; Indonesia | 2:38.29 | Nurita Monica Sari; Indonesia | 2:49.40 |
| 50 m butterfly | Jenjira Srisaard; Thailand | 27.59 | Marina Chan; Singapore | 27.88 | not awarded | |
| 50 m butterfly | Jenjira Srisaard; Thailand | 27.59 | Angel Gabriella Yus; Indonesia | 27.88 | not awarded | |
| 100 m butterfly | Marina Chan; Singapore | 1:02.10 | Lim Shun Qi; Malaysia | 1:02.72 | Kornkarnjana Sapianchai; Thailand | 1:03.04 |
| 200 m butterfly | Ong Yong Qi; Malaysia | 2:18.45 | Adinda Larasati Dewi Kirana; Indonesia | 2:18.63 | Panthira Subha-amorn; Thailand | 2:22.26 |
| 200 m individual medley | Chloe Isleta; Philippines | 2:18.95 | Phiangkhwan Pawapotako; Thailand | 2:20.78 | Azzahra Permatahani; Indonesia | 2:23.03 |
| 400 m individual medley | Azzahra Permatahani; Indonesia | 5:00.88 | Goh Chia Tong; Malaysia | 5:07.91 | Ong Yong Qi; Malaysia | 5:10.14 |
| 4 × 100 m freestyle relay | Thailand; Parada Promtaung; Kornkarnjana Sapianchai; Jenjira Srisaard; Fonpray Yamsuan | 3:53.76 | Malaysia; Leong Wan Mei; Lim Shun Qi; Lim Xiao Wei; Christy Teh Xing Ti | 4:03.37 | Singapore; Marina Chan; Chan Zi Yi; Chloe Cheong Tze Ing; Jade Lim Si Min | 4:07.31 |
| 4 × 200 m freestyle relay | Indonesia; Prada Hanan Farmadini; Adinda Larasati Dewi Kirana; Azzahra Permatahani; Angel Gabriella Yus | 8:30.85 | Thailand; Parada Promtaung; Kornkarnjana Sapianchai; Kanyaphak Sosakul; Fonpray Yamsuan | 8:39.50 | Malaysia; Goh Chia Tong; Keesha Ho; Leong Wan Mei; Ong Yong Qi | 8:51.19 |
| 4 × 100 m medley relay | Thailand; Phiangkhwan Pawapotako; Parada Promtaung; Kornkarnjana Sapianchai; Fonpray Yamsuan | 4:18.54 | Indonesia; Anak Agung Istri Kania Ratih Atmaja; Adinda Larasati Dewi Kirana; Azzahra Permatahani; Angel Gabriella Yus | 4:22.90 | Malaysia; Goh Chia Tong; Lee Yen Yi; Leong Wan Mei; Lim Shun Qi | 4:27.13 |
