= Karate at the 2017 World Games – Women's kata =

Women's Kata at the 2017 World Games
- Venue: GEM Sports Complex
- Date: 25 July 2017
- Competitors: 8 from 8 nations

Medalists
1st place, gold medalist(s)		(Japan) Kiyou Shimizu
2nd place, silver medalist(s)		(Spain) Sandra Sánchez
3rd place, bronze medalist(s)		(France) Sandy Scordo

The women's kata competition in karate at the 2017 World Games took place on 25 July 2017 at the GEM Sports Complex in Wrocław, Poland.

== Results ==
=== Elimination round ===
==== Group A ====
Rank	Athlete	B	W	D	L	Pts	Diff
1	Sandy Scordo (FRA)	3	3	0	0	13-2	+11
2	Sakura Kokumai (USA)	3	2	0	1	12-3	+9
3	Alexandrea Anacan (NZL)	3	1	0	2	4-11	-7
4	Olga Chmielewska (POL)	3	0	0	3	1-14	-13

	Score	
Sandy Scordo (FRA)	3–2	Sakura Kokumai (USA)
Alexandrea Anacan (NZL)	4–1	Olga Chmielewska (POL)
Sandy Scordo (FRA)	5–0	Alexandrea Anacan (NZL)
Sakura Kokumai (USA)	5–0	Olga Chmielewska (POL)
Sandy Scordo (FRA)	5–0	Olga Chmielewska (POL)
Sakura Kokumai (USA)	5–0	Alexandrea Anacan (NZL)

==== Group B ====
Rank	Athlete	B	W	D	L	Pts	Diff
1	Kiyou Shimizu (JPN)	3	3	0	0	13-2	+11
2	Sandra Sánchez (ESP)	3	2	0	1	12-3	+9
3	Sarah Sayed (EGY)	3	1	0	2	4-11	-7
4	Manel Kamilia Hadj Said (ALG)	3	0	0	3	1-14	-13

	Score	
Manel Kamilia Hadj Said (ALG)	0–5	Sandra Sánchez (ESP)
Sarah Sayed (EGY)	0–5	Kiyou Shimizu (JPN)
Manel Kamilia Hadj Said (ALG)	1–4	Sarah Sayed (EGY)
Sandra Sánchez (ESP)	2–3	Kiyou Shimizu (JPN)
Manel Kamilia Hadj Said (ALG)	0–5	Kiyou Shimizu (JPN)
Sandra Sánchez (ESP)	5–0	Sarah Sayed (EGY)

=== Finals ===
Semifinals
Sandy Scordo (FRA)	0
Sandra Sánchez (ESP)	5
Kiyou Shimizu (JPN)	5
Sakura Kokumai (USA)	0

Final
Sandra Sánchez (ESP)	1
Kiyou Shimizu (JPN)	4
Third place
Sandy Scordo (FRA)	5
Sakura Kokumai (USA)	0
