= Karate at the 2020 Summer Olympics – Women's kata =

Karate competition

Women's kata at the Games of the XXXII Olympiad
- Venue: Nippon Budokan
- Date: 5 August 2021
- Competitors: 10 from 10 nations

Medalists
1st place, gold medalist(s)		Sandra Sánchez	Spain
2nd place, silver medalist(s)		Kiyou Shimizu	Japan
3rd place, bronze medalist(s)		Grace Lau	Hong Kong
3rd place, bronze medalist(s)		Viviana Bottaro	Italy

The women's kata competition in Karate at the 2020 Summer Olympics was held on 5 August 2021 at the Nippon Budokan.

== Competition format ==
Competitors were divided into two pools of 5 or 6, and each took turns to perform two sets of kata in the elimination round. The top-three competitors by average score in each pool advanced to the ranking round, where they performed a third set of kata. The winner of pool A faced the winner of pool B in the gold medal bout. Two bronze medals were awarded in kata events. The runner-up of pool A faced the third-place finisher of pool B in a bronze medal bout, while the runner-up of pool B faced the third-place finisher of pool A in another bronze medal bout.

== Schedule ==
All times are in local time (UTC+9).

Date	Time	Round
Thursday, 5 August 2021	10:00; 11:25; 19:30; 19:50; 20:00	Elimination round Ranking round Bronze medal bouts Gold medal bout Victory ceremony

== Results ==
=== Elimination and ranking rounds ===
Pool A

Athlete	1st kata	2nd kata	Avg.	Rank	3rd kata	Rank	Qualification
Sandra Sánchez (ESP)	27.26	27.60	27.43	1 Q	27.86	1 Q	Gold medal bout
Grace Lau (HKG)	25.68	26.62	26.15	2 Q	26.40	2 q	Bronze medal bout
Sakura Kokumai (USA)	25.42	26.08	25.75	3 Q	25.54	3 q	Bronze medal bout
Jasmin Jüttner (GER)	24.42	24.16	24.29	4	Did not advance		
Puleksenija Jovanoska (MKD)	23.80	24.00	23.90	5	Did not advance		

Pool B

Athlete	1st kata	2nd kata	Avg.	Rank	3rd kata	Rank	Qualification
Kiyou Shimizu (JPN)	27.40	28.00	27.70	1 Q	27.86	1 Q	Gold medal bout
Viviana Bottaro (ITA)	25.54	25.60	25.57	2 Q	26.46	2 q	Bronze medal bout
Dilara Bozan (TUR)	24.46	25.06	24.76	3 Q	25.78	3 q	Bronze medal bout
Alexandra Feracci (FRA)	24.32	24.48	24.40	4	Did not advance		
Andrea Anacan (NZL)	23.46	23.78	23.62	5	Did not advance		

=== Bronze medal bouts ===
5 August; 19:30	Grace Lau (HKG)	26.94–26.52	Dilara Bozan (TUR)

5 August; 19:40	Sakura Kokumai (USA)	25.40–26.48	Viviana Bottaro (ITA)

=== Gold medal bout ===
5 August; 19:50	Sandra Sánchez (ESP)	28.06–27.88	Kiyou Shimizu (JPN)
