= Monsicha Tararattanakul =

Thai karateka (born 1998)

Personal information
- Born: 10 March 1998 (age 28)

Sport
- Country: Thailand
- Sport: Karate
- Event: Individual kata
Medal record
Women's karate
Representing Thailand
Asian Games
Bronze medal – third place	2018 Jakarta	Individual kata
Southeast Asian Games
Silver medal – second place	2021 Hanoi	Individual kata
Bronze medal – third place	2017 Kuala Lumpur	Individual kata
Bronze medal – third place	2019 Philippines	Individual kata
Asian Championships
Bronze medal – third place	2017 Astana	Individual kata

Monsicha Sakulrattanatara previously known as Monsicha Tararattanakul (born 10 March 1998) is a Thai karateka. She won one of the bronze medals in the women's kata event at the 2018 Asian Games held in Jakarta, Indonesia. She has also won medals at the Southeast Asian Games and the Asian Karate Championships.

== Career ==
At the 2017 Asian Karate Championships held in Astana, Kazakhstan, she won one of the bronze medals in the women's individual kata event. She also won one of the bronze medals in the women's individual kata event at the 2017 Southeast Asian Games in Kuala Lumpur, Malaysia. In 2018, she competed in the women's individual kata event at the World Karate Championships held in Madrid, Spain where she was eliminated in her first match by Sakura Kokumai of the United States.

In 2019, she won one of the bronze medals in the women's individual kata event at the Southeast Asian Games held in the Philippines. She also won one of the bronze medals in this event at the 2017 Southeast Asian Games in Kuala Lumpur, Malaysia.

She won the silver medal in the women's individual kata event at the 2021 Southeast Asian Games held in Hanoi, Vietnam.

== Achievements ==
Year	Competition	Venue	Rank	Event
2017	Asian Championships	Astana, Kazakhstan	3rd	Individual kata
2017	Southeast Asian Games	Kuala Lumpur, Malaysia	3rd	Individual kata
2018	Asian Games	Jakarta, Indonesia	3rd	Individual kata
2019	Southeast Asian Games	Manila, Philippines	3rd	Individual kata
2022	Southeast Asian Games	Hanoi, Vietnam	2nd	Individual kata
