= Lee Jia Rong =

Malaysian wushu practitioner (born 2004)

Personal information
- Born: 2004 (age 21–22) Kulai, Johor. Malaysia
- Occupations: Martial artist, athlete

Sport
- Sport: Wushu
- Team: Malaysia Wushu Team
Medal record
Women's Wushu Taolu
Representing Malaysia
World Championships
| Gold medal – first place | 2025 Brasília | Daoshu |
| Gold medal – first place | 2025 Brasília | Duilian |
| Bronze medal – third place | 2025 Brasília | Gunshu |
World Cup
| Gold medal – first place | 2026 Haikou | Daoshu |
| Gold medal – first place | 2026 Haikou | Duilian |
ASEAN University Games
| Silver medal – second place | 2022 Ubon Ratchathani | Qiangshu |
| Bronze medal – third place | 2022 Ubon Ratchathani | Duilian |

Lee Jia Rong (Chinese: 李佳蓉; pinyin: Lǐ Jiǎróng; born 2004) is a Malaysian wushu taolu athlete. She has won multiple medals for her country at the ASEAN University Games, Taolu World Cup the World Wushu Championships, the latter where she won three medals (including two gold).

== Career ==
Lee competed in the 2022 ASEAN University Games, winning the silver medal in qiangshu. She also won the bronze medal in the duilian events there. Lee competed in the 2024 Asian Wushu Championships, where her best finish was fourth place in the chanquan, daoshu and gunshu events.

Lee was called up to the Malaysian squad for the 2025 World Wushu Championships. She won the bronze medal in the gunshu event. She then won the gold medal in the daoshu and duilian events.

In 2026, Lee competed in the Taolu World Cup held in Haikou and won the gold medal in daoshu and duilian.
