= Badminton at the 2022 ASEAN University Games =

Events at 2022 ASEAN University Games

- Venue: Gymnasium, UBRU Main Campus
- Location: Ubon Ratchathani, Thailand
- Dates: 26–31 July

The badminton competition at the 2022 ASEAN University Games took place at UBRU Main Campus Gymnasium in Ubon Ratchathani, Thailand. 7 events were featured similarly to the past edition.

== Medal table ==
* Host nation (Thailand)

Rank	Nation	Gold	Silver	Bronze	Total
1	Malaysia	4	3	4	11
2	Indonesia	3	4	1	8
3	Thailand*	0	0	2	2
Totals (3 entries)		7	7	7	21

== Medalists ==
Event	Gold	Silver	Bronze
Men's singles	Faiz Rozain; Malaysia	Muhammad Rafi Zafran Ferary; Indonesia	Tai Chuan Zhe; Malaysia
Women's singles	Sri Fatmawati; Indonesia	Aurum Oktavia Winata; Indonesia	Saranya Navaratnarajah; Malaysia
Men's doubles	Indonesia; Reza Dwicahya Purnama; Muhammad Nendi Novatino	Malaysia; Ameer Amri Zainuddin; Faris Zaim	Malaysia; Tan Kok Xian; Tan Yi Han
Women's doubles	Malaysia; Teoh Le Xuan; Yap Rui Chen	Malaysia; Desiree Siow; Ng Qi Xuan	Indonesia; Nahla Aufa Dhia Ulhaq; Elizabeth Jovita
Mixed doubles	Indonesia; Dwiki Rafian Restu; Elizabeth Jovita	Malaysia; Desiree Siow; Tan Kok Xian	Malaysia; Faris Zaim; Gan Jing Err
Men's team	Malaysia; Ng Jun Yan; Faiz Rozain; Tai Chuan Zhe; Ameer Amri Zainuddin; Faris Zaim; Tan Kok Xian; Tan Yi Han	Indonesia; Muhammad Febriansyah; Reza Dwicahya Purnama; Muhammad Rafi Zafran Ferary; Muhammad Nendi Novatino; Dwiki Rafian Restu	Thailand; Panu Rakmesri; Panukorn Nimitpornchai; Punyapat Thipthaveecharn; Thananon Jitjaipuree; Tirawat Intajak; Titsanun Dechkongton; Warit Sarapat
Women's team	Malaysia; Saranya Navaratnarajah; Lim Jing Ning; Desiree Siow; Ng Qi Xuan; Gan Jing Err; Teoh Le Xuan; Yap Rui Chen	Indonesia; Sri Fatmawati; Aurum Oktavia Winata; Debora Pungky Cahyadewi; Nahla Aufa Dhia Ulhaq; Elizabeth Jovita	Thailand; Ladapa Singkaew; Nareerat Hongsa; Natchananpon Roongpiboonsopit; Ornicha Siriwadhanakul; Piengpor Sukwatthanakarnwit; Pornnicha Suwatnodom; Sasikarn Piyawatcharavijit
