= Hikaru Ono =

Japanese karateka (born 1992)

Personal information
- Born: 30 August 1992 (age 33)

Sport
- Country: Japan
- Sport: Karate
- Weight class: 50 kg
- Rank: 1st
- Events: Individual kata; Team kata; Kumite; Team kumite
Medal record
Women's karate
Representing Japan
World Championships
Gold medal – first place	2016 Linz	Team kata
Gold medal – first place	2023 Budapest	Individual kata
Silver medal – second place	2021 Dubai	Individual kata
Asian Championships
Gold medal – first place	2021 Almaty	Individual kata
Gold medal – first place	2022 Tashkent	Individual kata
Silver medal – second place	2011 Quanzhou	Kumite 50 kg
Silver medal – second place	2011 Quanzhou	Team kumite
Silver medal – second place	2012 Tashkent	Kumite 50 kg
World Games
Silver medal – second place	2022 Birmingham	Individual kata

Hikaru Ono (大野 ひかる, Ōno Hikaru) (born 30 August 1992) is a Japanese karateka. She won the gold medal in the women's individual kata event at the 2023 World Karate Championships held in Budapest, Hungary. She is also a two-time gold medalist in this event at the Asian Karate Championships.

== Career ==
She won the silver medal in the women's individual kata event at the World Karate Federation's 2021 World Karate Championships held in Dubai, United Arab Emirates. A month later, she won the gold medal in this event at the 2021 Asian Karate Championships held in Almaty, Kazakhstan.

She won the silver medal in the women's kata event at the 2022 World Games held in Birmingham, United States, losing out to Sandra Sánchez.

After winning gold in the 2023 Karate 1-Premier League Dublin, she was awarded the league's title of "Grand Winner" in women's kata for 2023. In October 2023, she won the gold medal in the women's individual kata event at the World Karate Championships held in Budapest, Hungary.

== Achievements ==
Year	Competition	Venue	Rank	Event
2011	Asian Championships	Quanzhou, China	2nd	Kumite 50 kg
2011	Asian Championships	Quanzhou, China	2nd	Team kumite
2012	Asian Championships	Tashkent, Uzbekistan	2nd	Kumite 50 kg
2016	World Championships	Linz, Austria	1st	Team kata
2021	World Championships	Dubai, United Arab Emirates	2nd	Individual kata
2021	Asian Championships	Almaty, Kazakhstan	1st	Individual kata
2022	World Games	Birmingham, United States	2nd	Individual kata
2022	Asian Championships	Tashkent, Uzbekistan	1st	Individual kata
2023	World Championships	Budapest, Hungary	1st	Individual kata
