= Sakura Kokumai =

American karateka (born 1992)

Personal information
- Born: October 2, 1992 (age 33) Honolulu, Hawaii, US
- Education: Doshisha University; Waseda University
- Height: 5 ft 0 in (1.52 m)

Sport
- Country: United States
- Sport: Shitō-ryū Karate
- Rank: 4th Degree Black Belt
- Event: Individual kata

Achievements and titles
- Highest world ranking: 5th
Medal record
Women's karate
Representing United States
Pan American Games
Gold medal – first place	2019 Lima	Individual kata
Gold medal – first place	2023 Santiago	Individual kata
World Karate Championships
Bronze medal – third place	2012 Paris	Individual kata
World Combat Games
Bronze medal – third place	2013 Saint Petersburg	Individual kata

Sakura Kokumai (born October 2, 1992) is an American karateka. She won the gold medal in the women's individual kata event at the 2019 Pan American Games in Lima, Peru and the 2023 Pan American Games in Santiago, Chile. She represented the United States in the women's kata event at the 2020 Summer Olympics in Tokyo, Japan.

== Career ==
In 2012, Kokumai won a bronze medal in the individual kata event at the World Karate Championships held in Paris, France. The following year, she won the bronze medal in the women's kata event at the 2013 World Combat Games held in Saint Petersburg, Russia. In 2014, Kokumai won the gold medal in the women's kata event at the Pan American Sports Festival held in Tlaxcala, Mexico. She won the silver medal in her event at the 2016 World University Karate Championships held in Braga, Portugal.

At the 2017 World Games held in Wrocław, Poland, Kokumai lost her bronze medal match against Sandy Scordo of France in the women's kata event. In 2018, she competed in the women's individual kata event at the World Karate Championships held in Madrid, Spain where she was eliminated in her third match by Viviana Bottaro of Italy.

Kokumai won the gold medal in the women's individual kata event at the 2019 Pan American Games held in Lima, Peru. She competed in the women's individual kata event at the 2019 World Beach Games held in Doha, Qatar without winning a medal. She finished in 5th place.

In April 2021, during a training session, Kokumai was subjected to anti-Asian harassment, of which she captured the incident via Instagram.

At the 2020 Summer Olympics in Tokyo, Japan, Kokumai competed in the women's kata where she lost her bronze medal match against Viviana Bottaro of Italy. A few months after the Olympics, she also lost her bronze medal match against Bottaro in the women's individual kata event at the 2021 World Karate Championships held in Dubai, United Arab Emirates.

Kokumai competed in the women's kata event at the 2022 World Games held in Birmingham, United States. In 2023, she lost her bronze medal match in the women's individual kata event at the World Karate Championships held in Budapest, Hungary. A week later, Kokumai won the gold medal in her event at the 2023 Pan American Games held in Santiago, Chile.

== Achievements ==
Year	Competition	Venue	Rank	Event
2012	World Championships	Paris, France	3rd	Individual kata
2013	World Combat Games	Saint Petersburg, Russia	3rd	Individual kata
2019	Pan American Games	Lima, Peru	1st	Individual kata
2023	Pan American Games	Santiago, Chile	1st	Individual kata
