= Andrea Anacan =

New Zealand karateka

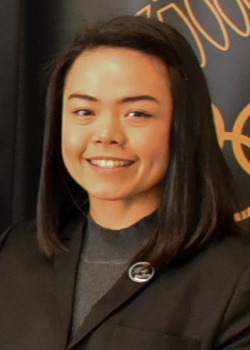

Personal information
- Born: 24 November 1990 (age 35)

Sport
- Country: New Zealand
- Sport: Karate

Alexandrea Anacan is a Philippine-born New Zealand karate athlete. A resident of Auckland, Anacan represents New Zealand internationally. She is a four-time consecutive gold medalist in the World Karate Federation (Continental Championship) Oceanian Karate Federation (OKF), entering competition in 2016. Her achievements include finishing 2nd at the Commonwealth Karate Championships, 5th at the Karate World Games (winning the Oceania qualifying competition outright) and 3rd place at the World University Games, the largest international multi-sport event other than the Olympics.

== Early life ==
Anacan began practising Karate at the age of four. She won several medals, including gold, silver and bronze medals in the Auckland Open, New Zealand Open, Australian Open, New Zealand Nationals, and Hamilton Open. She participated in World Beach Games and Pre-Olympic Qualification.

When her family moved to Auckland, Anacan began training with the SSKANZ school.

== Career ==
She became an instructor for SSKANZ and a national judge and referee.

She competes as a member of the New Zealand national karate team.

=== 2020 Summer Olympics ===
She qualified for the 2020 Summer Olympics in Tokyo, Japan Continental Representation qualifying spots, where karate featured for the first time. She represented New Zealand at the karate competition. In the women's kata event, she finished in 5th place in the elimination round and she did not advance to compete in a medal match.

== Record ==
Competition Results
Year	Competition	Venue	Rank	Event
2020	Karate 1 Premier League	Salzburg Austria	7th	Female Kata
2020	Karate 1 Premier League	Dubai United Arab Emirates	7th	Female Kata
2020	Karate 1 Premier League	Paris France	19th	Female Kata
2019	Karate 1 Premier League	Madrid Spain	23rd	Female Kata
2019	2019 Karate1 Series A	Santiago Chile	13th	Female Kata
2019	Karate 1 Premier League	Tokyo Japan	–	Female Kata
2019	2019 Karate1 Series A	Montreal Canada	15th	Female Kata
2019	Karate 1 Premier League	Shanghai China	21st	Female Kata
2019	OKF Senior Karate Championship	Sydney Australia	1st place, gold medalist(s)	Female Kata
2018	Senior World Karate Championship	Madrid Madagascar	7th	Female Kata
2018	Karate 1 Premier League	Tokyo Japan	–	Female Kata
2018	19th Senior & 18th Cadet Junior U21 Oceania Karate Championship	Auckland New Zealand	1st place, gold medalist(s)	Female Kata
2017	18th Senior Oceania Karate Championship	aus Australia	1st place, gold medalist(s)	Female Kata
2016	Senior World Karate Championship	Linz Austria	–	Female Kata
2016	17th Senior Oceania Karate Championship	Nouméa New Caledonia	1st place, gold medalist(s)	Female Kata
2014	Senior World Karate Championship	Bremen Germany	–	Female Kata
2014	Karate 1 Premier League	Okinawa Japan	–	Female Kata
2012	Karate 1 Jakarta	Jakarta Indonesia	–	Female Kata
2014	20th Senior World Karate Championship	Belgrade Serbia	–	Female Kata
2014	19th Senior World Karate Championship	Tokyo Japan	–	Female Kata
