= Sou Soi Lam =

Macau karateka (born 1989)

Personal information
- Born: 14 September 1989 (age 36)

Sport
- Country: Macau
- Sport: Karate
- Event: Individual kata
Medal record
Women's karate
Representing Macau
Asian Games
Silver medal – second place	2018 Jakarta	Individual kata

Sou Soi Lam (蘇瑞林,born 14 September 1989) is a Macau karateka. She won the silver medal in the women's kata event at the 2018 Asian Games held in Jakarta, Indonesia. In the same year, she also competed in the women's individual kata event at the 2018 World Karate Championships held in Madrid, Spain.

She lost her bronze medal match at the 2022 Asian Karate Championships held in Tashkent, Uzbekistan. In 2023, she competed in the women's kata event at the 2022 Asian Games held in Hangzhou, China.

== Achievements ==
Year	Competition	Venue	Rank	Event
2018	Asian Games	Jakarta, Indonesia	2nd	Individual kata
