= Bimala Tamang =

Nepalese karateka (born 1995)

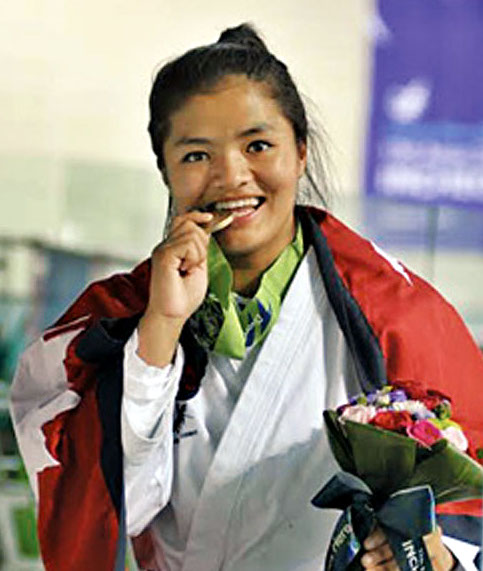
- Bimala Tamang after winning bronze in 2014 Asian Games

Personal information
- Born: 9 June 1995 (age 31) Dhading, Nepal
- Height: 158 cm (5 ft 2 in)
- Weight: 55 kg (121 lb)

Sport
- Sport: Karate
- Club: Balaju Karate Do Academy
- Coached by: Aakbar Shah; Deepak Shrestha
Medal record
Women's karate
Representing Nepal
Asian Games
Bronze medal – third place	2014 Incheon	Individual kata

Bimala Tamang (Nepali: विमला तामाङ; born 9 June 1995) is a (Nepalese) Nepali female karateka who recently won bronze for the Women's Individual Kata (in Karate) at the 2014 Asian Games in Incheon, South Korea. This was Nepal's first and only medal tallied at the 2014 Games.

== Al-Ahli International Karate Open ==
During the 2012 Al-Ahli International karate Open in Dubai, UAE, Tamang landed herself several medals in the individual kata; joint bronze in female seniors A, gold in female U18 A, silver in Kata team female U18 A and Kumite team female U17 A.
