= Karate at the 2022 ASEAN University Games =

Karate competition

- Venue: Ban Yang Noi Campus
- Location: Ubon Rachathani, Thailand

The karate competition at the 2022 ASEAN University Games was held in Ubon Rachathani, Thailand in the Ban Yang Noi Campus.

2022 ASEAN University Games officially the 20th ASEAN University Games and also known as Ubon Ratchathani 2022 is a regional multi-sport event currently held from 26 July to 6 August 2022 in Ubon Ratchathani, Thailand. Originally planned to take place from 13 to 22 December 2020, it was eventually rescheduled as a result of the COVID-19 pandemic.

== Medalists ==
=== Kata ===
Event	Gold	Silver	Bronze
Men's individual	Ahmad Zigi Zaresta Yuda; Indonesia	Song Chan Zen; Malaysia	Kojiro Yong; Malaysia
Women's individual	Krisda Putri Aprilia; Indonesia	Madeline Wong Mei Ge; Malaysia	Irinlada Sriargardkraisang; Thailand
Men's team	Malaysia; Dennis Lim Kai Xiang; Kojiro Yong; Song Chan Zhen	Thailand; Phatchara Yantapanich; Audomsap Saraphong; Nattaphumin Sakultham	not awarded
Women's team	Indonesia; Anugerah Nurul Lucky; Emilia Sri Hanandyta; Dian Monika Nababan	Thailand; Chayada Markmee; Panuchanart Suepson; Keeratikan Srisakun	not awarded

=== Kumite ===
==== Men ====
Event	Gold	Silver	Bronze
−55 kg	Audomsap Saraphong; Thailand	Phetsavanh Lasasimma; Laos	Roi Vincent Vergara; Philippines
−60 kg	Ari Saputra; Indonesia	Geerijaieswaran Pillai Sivanesan; Malaysia	Thananant Soonthoporn; Thailand
−67 kg	Sureeya Sankar Hari Sankar; Malaysia	Nur Halim Arlendi; Indonesia	Chaiwat Phiandee; Thailand
−75 kg	Teerapat Kanabkaew; Thailand	Ignatius Joshua Kandou; Indonesia	M Arif Afifuddin Ab Malik; Malaysia
−84 kg	Sandi Firmansah; Indonesia	Kathish Gnanasekaran; Malaysia	Rajev Naaidu Sukunaselan; Malaysia
+84 kg	Denishroy Arulveeran; Malaysia	Pirunporn Chumpootong; Thailand	Bin Mengly; Cambodia
Team	Indonesia; Ignatius Joshua Kandou; Nur Halim Arlendi; Ari Saputra	Malaysia; Geerijaieswaran Pillai Sivanesan; Kumar Kueggen Vijaya; M Arif Afifuddin Ab Malik	Thailand; Teerapat Kanabkaew; Chaiwat Phiandee; Nattapon Buran

==== Women ====
Event	Gold	Silver	Bronze
−50 kg	Shahmalarani Chandran; Malaysia	Toukta Moukdavong; Laos	Dwi Fadhilah; Indonesia
−55 kg	Madhuri Poovanesan; Malaysia	Dharshini Gnanasekaran; Malaysia	Maneewan Butsuwan; Thailand
−61 kg	Siti Nur Azwani Nor Azli; Malaysia	Chananchida Thamol; Thailand	Pa Torvanhxai; Laos
−68 kg	Ceyco Georgia Zefanya; Indonesia	Phuong Sophal; Cambodia	Amirah Syahirah Azlan; Malaysia
+68 kg	Kewalin Songklin; Thailand	Aisyah Izzmiah Datu Ahmad; Malaysia	not awarded
Team	Indonesia; Ceyco Georgia Zefanya; Dwi Fadhilah; Kartika Herliana	Malaysia; Dharshini Gnanasekaran; Madhuri Poovanesan; Shahmalarani Chandran; Siti Nur Azwani Nor Azli	Thailand; Kewalin Songklin; Chananchida Thamol; Maneewan Butsuwan
