= 2022 ASEAN University Games =

Sports event in Ubon Ratchathani, Thailand

XX ASEAN University Games
- Host city: Ubon Ratchathani, Thailand
- Motto: Games for Sustainability
- Nations: 11
- Events: 236 in 23 sports
- Opening: 26 July
- Closing: 6 August
- Opened by: Pongrat Phiromrat; Governor of Ubon Ratchathani
- Closed by: Thammarak La-ongnuan; President of the Ubon Ratchathani Rajabhat University
- Ceremony venue: Ubon Ratchathani Rajabhat University
- Website: 2022 ASEAN University Games

2022 ASEAN University Games officially the 20th ASEAN University Games and also known as Ubon Ratchathani 2022 was a regional multi-sport event held from 26 July to 6 August 2022 in Ubon Ratchathani, Thailand. Originally planned to take place from 13 to 22 December 2020, it was rescheduled as a result of the COVID-19 pandemic.

== Preparation and development ==
=== Venues ===
The 20th ASEAN University Games has 13 venues for the games.

Competition Venue	Sports
Ubon Rachathani Rajabhat University	Opening and closing ceremony
Ban Yang Noi Campus	Swimming, Karate, Athletics, Volleyball, Sports climbing, Taekwondo
Badminton Stadium, UBRU Main Campus	Badminton
Faculty of Nursing, UBRU Main Campus	Table tennis
UBRU Main Campus; UMT Stadium	Football
Main Stadium, Provincial Administrative Organization (PAO)	Archery
Sisaket City	Tennis, Rowing
Sunee Tower	Fencing, Pencak silat, Wushu
Faculty of Public Health, UBRU Main Campus	Chess
Boxing Gym, UBRU Main Campus	Muaythai
Indoor Stadium, UBRU Main Campus	Futsal
Petanque Suannok, UBRU Main Campus	Petanque
Gymnasium, UBRU Main Campus	Basketball
Faculty of Computer Science, UBRU Main Campus	Esports
Stadium, UBRU Main Campus	Beach volleyball
Benjamamaharaj School	Sepak takraw

== The Games ==
=== Sports ===
There were 23 sports for these games.

2022 ASEAN University Games Sporting Programmes

- Archery (10)
- Athletics (41)
- Badminton (7)
- Basketball (2)
- Chess (4)
- Esports (3)
- Fencing (11)
- Football
  - Football (1)
  - Futsal (1)
- Karate (17)
- Muaythai (6)
- Pencak silat (20)
- Pétanque (9)
- Rowing (9)
- Sepak takraw (3)
- Sport climbing (8)
- Swimming (38)
- Table tennis (7)
- Taekwondo (18)
- Tennis (3)
- Volleyball (2)
  - Beach volleyball (1)
  - Indoor volleyball (1)
- Wushu (16)

=== Participating nations ===
All 11 members of Southeast Asian Games Federation took part in the 2022 Asean University Games. Below is a list of all the participating NOCs.

While Thailand and Indonesia were initially barred from using their national flags due to sanctions by the World Anti-Doping Agency, the sanction was lifted on 3 February 2022.

- Brunei (BRU)
- Cambodia (CAM)
- Indonesia (INA)
- Laos (LAO)
- Malaysia (MAS)
- Myanmar (MYA)
- Philippines (PHI)
- Singapore (SGP)
- Thailand (THA) (Host)
- Timor-Leste (TLS)
- Vietnam (VIE)

=== Calendar ===
OC	Opening ceremony	●	Event competition	1	Gold medal events	CC	Closing ceremony

July/August 2022		26th Tue	27th Wed	28th Thu	29th Fri	30th Sat	31st Sun	1st Mon	2nd Tue	3rd Wed	4th Thu	5th Fri	6th Sat	Events
Ceremonies				OC									CC	—N/a
Archery				●	●	●	10							10
Athletics			11	10	10	10								41
Badminton		●	●	2	●	●	5							7
Basketball								●	●		●	●	2	2
Chess					●	●		●	●	4				4
Esports									●	●	●	3		3
Fencing					3	3	3	2						11
Football	Football		●	●	●	●	●	●	●		●	1		2
Football	Futsal						●	●	●	1				2
Karate			7	8	2									17
Muaythai							●	●	●		6			6
Pencak silat									5	3	10	2		20
Petanque								2	●	3	2	2		9
Rowing										3	2	2	2	9
Sepak takraw										●	1	●	2	3
Sport climbing				2	2	2	●	2						8
Swimming		8	8	8	7	7								38
Table tennis			●	2	1	2	2							7
Taekwondo									5	5	4	4		18
Tennis								1	2					3
Volleyball	Beach volleyball								●	●	●	●	1	2
Volleyball	Volleyball			●	●	●	1							2
Wushu										4	4	4	4	16
Daily medal events		8	26	32	25	24	21	7	12	23	29	18	11	236
Cumulative total		8	34	66	91	115	136	143	155	178	207	225	236	236
July/August 2022		26th Tue	27th Wed	28th Thu	29th Fri	30th Sat	31st Sun	1st Mon	2nd Tue	3rd Wed	4th Thu	5th Fri	6th Sat	Total events

== Medal table ==
* Host nation (Thailand)

2022 ASEAN University Games medal table
Rank	Nation	Gold	Silver	Bronze	Total
1	Thailand*	109	61	42	212
2	Malaysia	49	83	50	182
3	Indonesia	43	39	37	119
4	Vietnam	13	6	9	28
5	Singapore	8	19	26	53
6	Laos	5	8	20	33
7	Philippines	5	4	4	13
8	Cambodia	2	7	8	17
9	Myanmar	2	2	2	6
10	Timor-Leste	0	1	3	4
11	Brunei	0	0	0	0
Totals (11 entries)		236	230	201	667

Preceded by Naypyidaw; 2018	ASEAN University Games; Ubon Ratchathani; XX ASEAN University Games (2022)	Succeeded by
