= Sri Fatmawati =

Indonesian badminton player (born 1999)

Personal information
- Born: 7 June 1999 (age 27) Probolinggo, East Java, Indonesia

Sport
- Country: Indonesia
- Sport: Badminton

Women's singles
- Highest ranking: 120 (22 June 2017)
- BWF profile

Sri Fatmawati (born 7 June 1999) is an Indonesian badminton player from Jaya Raya Jakarta badminton club. She started her career as a badminton player when she was in the grade eight junior high school, and joined Pelatcab Abadi Probolinggo. Fatmawati who came from Tamansari village in Dringu, Probolinggo, represented East Java competed at the 2014 National Youth Games and won the gold medal in the singles event. She won her first senior international title at the 2016 Bahrain International tournament.

In 2022, she participated in the ASEAN University Games and won a gold medal in the women's singles and a silver medal in the women's team.

== Achievements ==
=== ASEAN University Games ===
Women's singles
| Year | Venue | Opponent | Score | Result | Ref. |
|---|---|---|---|---|---|
| 2022 | Gymnasium UBRU Main Campus, Ubon Ratchathani, Thailand | (Indonesia) Aurum Oktavia Winata | 17–21, 21–15, 21–19 | Gold | |

=== BWF International Challenge/Series (6 titles) ===
Women's singles
| Year | Tournament | Opponent | Score | Result | Ref. |
|---|---|---|---|---|---|
| 2016 | Bahrain International Challenge | (Indonesia) Asty Dwi Widyaningrum | 21–14, 21–16 | (gold) Winner | |
| 2018 | Bahrain International Series | (India) Neha Pandit | 21–8, 21–14 | (gold) Winner | |
| 2019 | Malaysia International | (Malaysia) Eoon Qi Xuan | 21–19, 21–8 | (gold) Winner | |
| 2019 | Myanmar International | (Indonesia) Maharani Sekar Batari | 21–16, 21–13 | (gold) Winner | |
| 2019 | Bahrain International Series | (India) Ira Sharma | 21–14, 24–22 | (gold) Winner | |
| 2022 | Mongolia International | (Indonesia) Ester Nurumi Tri Wardoyo | 21–14, 23–21 | (gold) Winner | |

BWF International Challenge tournament
BWF International Series tournament

== Performance timeline ==
Key

| W | Won | F | Finalist | SF | Semi-finalist |
| QF | Quarter-finalist | #R | Rounds 4, 3, 2, 1 | RR | Round-robin stage |
| Q# | Qualification round | A | Absent | | |
| G | Gold | S | Silver | B | Bronze |
| NH | Not held | N/A | Not applicable | DNQ | Did not qualify |

To avoid confusion and double counting, these charts are updated at the conclusion of a tournament or when the player's participation has ended.

=== Individual competitions ===
- Senior level

| Tournament | BWF Grand Prix and Grand Prix Gold | | | BWF World Tour | | | | | Best |
| Tournament | 2015 | 2016 | 2017 | 2018 | 2019 | 2020 | 2021 | 2022 | Best |
|---|---|---|---|---|---|---|---|---|---|
| Thailand Open | A | | 2R | A | | | NH | A | 2R ('17) |
| Indonesia Masters | 1R | A | NH | A | | | | | 1R ('15) |
| Indonesia Open | A | | Q1 | A | | NH | A | | Q1 ('17) |
| Malaysia Masters | A | | 1R | A | | | NH | A | 1R ('17) |
| Vietnam Open | A | 1R | A | | | NH | | A | 1R ('16) |
| Indonesia Masters Super 100 | NA | | | 2R | 2R | NH | | 2R | 2R ('18, '19, '22) |
| Year-end ranking | 280 | 173 | 156 | 169 | 130 | 134 | 175 | | 120 |
