= María Dimitrova =

Dominican martial artist

- Born: October 11, 1985 (age 41); Sofia, Bulgaria
- Nationality: Bulgarian / Dominican
- Height: 160 cm (5 ft 3 in)
- Weight: 51 kg (112 lb; 8 st 0 lb)
- Style: Shito Ryu – Shito Kai
- Team: Dominican National Karate Team
- Trainer: Shihan Masayasu Kametani
- Rank: Black Belt 5th Dan
- Years active: Training since 1989

Other information
- Occupation: Athlete
- University: Grantham University, USA
- Notable relatives: (Mother) Maya Ivanova (Father) Valeri Dimitrov
- Notable school: Dimitrova Dojo
- Website: DimitrovaDojo.com
- Last updated on: June 7, 2015

María Dimitrova (born October 11, 1985) is a Bulgarian born, Dominican martial artist who practices karate.

== Early life ==
She was born in Bulgaria to father Valeri Dimitrov and mother Maya Ivanova, both citizens of that same country. At the age of 6, her family made the trip to the Dominican Republic and settled for good in Sosua, Puerto Plata. A friend of the family had recommended the country to them.

María started to practice Karate when she was four years old, as her father was a Karateka as well. The "Karate Princess" (as she's called much due to her looks and ability in Martial Art) has been ranked among the best in the world in Female Kata since 2005, when she won the gold medal at the XVI Pan-American Junior Karate Championship in Montevideo, Uruguay. That same year, she also won her first world medal at the WKF World Junior Karate Championship, Cyprus.

== Career ==
In 2006, Dimitrova began to travel to Japan for special training with 7 times World Champions – brothers Hasegawa senseis. That year, as a result of the training in Japan, she was able to win the gold medal at the 2006 Central American and Caribbean Games in Cartagena de Indias, Colombia, and became one of the Top Athletes for the Dominican Olympics Committee.

In 2008, she ranked 5th place at the World Senior Karate Championship in Japan. That same year, she became Senior Panamerican Champion, and repeated that gold medal in 2009, 2010, and 2014 in Female Kata.

In 2009, Dimitrova qualified for the World Games in representation of the American continent, finished in 2nd place, and made history for Karate in the Dominican Republic and Female Kata in America.

In 2009, Dimitrova decided to form a Team Kata with two of her students (Franchell Velazquez and Heydi Reynoso), and three years later, the team became Panamerican Champion in 2013, 2014 and 2015.

== Awards and honors ==
Dimitrova has been given the award of Karate Athlete of The Year, in recognition from the Dominican Federation of Karate (FEDOKARATE), the Sports Writers Association (ACD) and the Dominican Olympic Committee (COD) six times already, in 2006, 2008, 2009, 2010, 2012 and 2013. Thanks to her international achievements in Karate, she has been set as an example for the youth of the Dominican Republic. She has been nominated and finalist for the National Youth Award in 2008, 2009, 2010, 2013, given by the Ministry of the National Youth of the Dominican Republic.

In addition to her work as an athlete, Dimitrova has also achieved recognition as an Instructor. In January 2015, she was named National Junior Kata Coach by the Dominican Karate Federation. She is also Chief Instructor of the Dominican Karate Air Force Team since 2010. She has conducted International Seminars in USA, Mexico, Peru, Bulgaria, Guatemala, Venezuela and Nicaragua.

== Personal life ==
Dimitrova earned her bachelor Business Administration degree at Grantham University in Kansas City, United States. She's also an entrepreneur, as she started her own company under Martial Arts & Sportquip, and currently owns two Karate Dojos under the name ´´Dimitrova Dojo´´. www.dimitrovadojo.com

At the age of 15, Dimitrova started working in a TV show in Dominican Republic as the main host, and later on became the show's producer. During her TV production time, she was able to sign a contract with a European TV Satellite carrier to carry tourism programming to 24 countries in three languages. She describes a passion for TV production, but emphasizes that it's a time-consuming task with a heavy toll of dedication for success, just like Karate, which made it very difficult for her to carry on with both projects.

She is married to two-time Olympic gold medalist Felix Sanchez.
