= Karate at the 2011 Pan American Games – Qualification =

== Qualification summary ==
The following nations qualified:

| NOC | Men | | | | | Women | | | | | Total |
| NOC | 60kg | 67kg | 75kg | 84kg | 84+kg | 50kg | 55kg | 61kg | 68kg | 68+kg | Total |
|---|---|---|---|---|---|---|---|---|---|---|---|
| Argentina | | | | | X | | | X | | X | 3 |
| Brazil | X | | | | X | X | X | | X | X | 6 |
| Canada | | | | X | X | | | X | | X | 4 |
| Chile | X | | X | | | X | X | | X | X | 6 |
| Colombia | X | | | X | | X | | | | | 3 |
| Costa Rica | | | | | | | | | X | | 1 |
| Cuba | | X | X | | | | X | | X | | 4 |
| Dominican Republic | X | X | X | X | | X | X | X | X | | 8 |
| Ecuador | | X | X | | | | X | | | | 3 |
| El Salvador | X | X | X | X | X | | | | | | 5 |
| Guatemala | | | | | | X | X | | | X | 3 |
| Mexico | X | X | X | X | X | X | X | X | X | X | 10 |
| Netherlands Antilles | | | | | | | | X | | | 1 |
| Panama | | | | | | | | X | | | 1 |
| Peru | X | X | X | X | | | | X | | | 5 |
| Puerto Rico | | | | | X | | | | | X | 2 |
| Trinidad and Tobago | | | | | X | | | | | | 1 |
| United States | X | X | X | | | X | X | | X | | 6 |
| Uruguay | | | | X | | | | | | | 1 |
| Venezuela | | X | | X | X | X | | X | X | X | 7 |
| Total: 20 NOCs | 8 | 8 | 8 | 8 | 8 | 8 | 8 | 8 | 8 | 8 | 80 |

== Qualification by category ==
=== -60kg Men ===
| Competition | Location | Vacancies | Qualified |
|---|---|---|---|
| Host | – | 1 | (Mexico) Manuel Araujo |
| 2010 South American Games | (Colombia) Medellín | 2 | (Colombia) Andrés Rendón (Chile) Miguel Oviedo |
| 2010 Central American and Caribbean Games | (Puerto Rico) Mayagüez | 2 | (El Salvador) David Pérez (Dominican Republic) Norberto Sosa |
| 2011 Pan American Championships ^{1} | (Mexico) Guadalajara | 2 | (Peru) Dennis Lazo (Brazil) Douglas Brose |
| 2011 North American Karate Championship ^{2} | (Canada) Montreal | 1 | (United States) Adam Brozer |
| TOTAL | | 8 | |

=== -67kg Men ===
| Competition | Location | Vacancies | Qualified |
|---|---|---|---|
| Host | – | 1 | (Mexico) Daniel Carrillo |
| 2010 South American Games | (Colombia) Medellín | 2 | (Venezuela) Jean Pena (Ecuador) Daniel Alejandro Acosta |
| 2010 Central American and Caribbean Games | (Puerto Rico) Mayagüez | 2 | (Dominican Republic) Deivis Ferreras (Puerto Rico) ~~Jesús Rodríguez~~^{6} (El Salvador) Carlos Galán |
| 2011 Pan American Championships ^{1} | (Mexico) Guadalajara | 2 | (Cuba) Dennis Novo (Peru) Jesus Paucarcaja |
| 2011 North American Karate Championship ^{2} | (Canada) Montreal | 1 | (United States) Brian Mertel |
| TOTAL | | 8 | |

=== -75kg Men ===
| Competition | Location | Vacancies | Qualified |
|---|---|---|---|
| Host | – | 1 | (Mexico) Antonia Gutierrez |
| 2010 South American Games | (Colombia) Medellín | 2 | (Chile) David Israel Firmani (Ecuador) Esteban Espinoza |
| 2010 Central American and Caribbean Games | (Puerto Rico) Mayagüez | 2 | (Dominican Republic) Dionicio Gustavo (El Salvador) Aarón Pérez |
| 2011 Pan American Championships ^{1} | (Mexico) Guadalajara | 2 | (Cuba) Javier Zamora (Peru) Israel Aco |
| 2011 North American Karate Championship ^{2} | (Canada) Montreal | 1 | (United States) Tom Scott |
| TOTAL | | 8 | |

=== -84kg Men ===
| Competition | Location | Vacancies | Qualified |
|---|---|---|---|
| Host | – | 1 | (Mexico) Homero Morales |
| 2010 South American Games | (Colombia) Medellín | 2 | (Peru) Edwin Luis Asserto (Venezuela) Cesar Herrera |
| 2010 Central American and Caribbean Games | (Puerto Rico) Mayagüez | 2 | (El Salvador) José Paz (Dominican Republic) Jorge Peréz |
| 2011 Pan American Championships ^{1} | (Mexico) Guadalajara | 2 | (Colombia) Yilber Ocoro (Uruguay) Pablo Layerla |
| 2011 North American Karate Championship ^{2} | (Canada) Montreal | 1 | (Canada) Sorin Alexandru |
| TOTAL | | 8 | |

=== 84+kg Men ===
| Competition | Location | Vacancies | Qualified |
|---|---|---|---|
| Host | – | 1 | (Mexico) Alberto Ramirez |
| 2010 South American Games | (Colombia) Medellín | 2 | (Venezuela) Ángel Aponte (Argentina) Franco Recouso |
| 2010 Central American and Caribbean Games | (Puerto Rico) Mayagüez | 2 | (Trinidad and Tobago) Kwame Kinsale (Puerto Rico) Nelson González |
| 2011 Pan American Championships ^{1} | (Mexico) Guadalajara | 2 | (El Salvador) Jorge Alexander Merino (Brazil) Wellington Barbosa |
| 2011 North American Karate Championship ^{2} | (Canada) Montreal | 1 | (Canada) Shaun Dhillon |
| TOTAL | | 8 | |

=== -50kg Women ===
| Competition | Location | Vacancies | Qualified |
|---|---|---|---|
| Host | – | 1 | (Mexico) Laura Contreras |
| 2010 South American Games | (Colombia) Medellín | 2 | (Chile) Gabriela Piutrin (Brazil) Jessica Cândido |
| 2010 Central American and Caribbean Games | (Puerto Rico) Mayagüez | 2 | (Guatemala) Cheili Gonzalez (Dominican Republic) Ana Villanueva |
| 2011 Pan American Championships ^{1} | (Mexico) Guadalajara | 2 | (Venezuela) Dougmay Camacaro (United States) Tyler Wolfe |
| Automatic ^{3} | (Mexico) Guadalajara | 1 | (Colombia) Paula Ruiz^{5} |
| TOTAL | | 8 | |

=== -55kg Women ===
| Competition | Location | Vacancies | Qualified |
|---|---|---|---|
| Host | – | 1 | (Mexico) Lorena Mendoza |
| 2010 South American Games | (Colombia) Medellín | 2 | (Chile) Jessy Makarena Contreras (Brazil) Valéria Kumizaki |
| 2010 Central American and Caribbean Games | (Puerto Rico) Mayagüez | 2 | (Guatemala) Esther Micheo (Dominican Republic) Karina Diaz |
| 2011 Pan American Championships ^{1} | (Mexico) Guadalajara | 2 | (Ecuador) Jacqueline Factos (United States) Shannon Nishi |
| Automatic ^{3} | (Mexico) Guadalajara | 1 | (Cuba) Yanelsis Gongora ^{5} |
| TOTAL | | 8 | |

=== -61kg Women ===
| Competition | Location | Vacancies | Qualified |
|---|---|---|---|
| Host | – | 1 | (Mexico) Bertha Gutierrez |
| 2010 South American Games | (Colombia) Medellín | 2 | (Peru) Alexandra Grande (Argentina) Virginia Acevedo |
| 2010 Central American and Caribbean Games | (Puerto Rico) Mayagüez | 2 | (Dominican Republic) Ana Montilla; Marisca Verspaget |
| 2011 Pan American Championships ^{1} | (Mexico) Guadalajara | 2 | (Venezuela) Daniela Suarez (Panama) Yaremi Borzelli |
| 2011 North American Karate Championship ^{2} | (Canada) Montreal | 1 | (Canada) Golrokh Khalili |
| TOTAL | | 8 | |

=== -68kg Women ===
| Competition | Location | Vacancies | Qualified |
|---|---|---|---|
| Host | – | 1 | (Mexico) Yadira Lira |
| 2010 South American Games | (Colombia) Medellín | 2 | (Venezuela) Yoly Guillén (Brazil) Lucélia Ribeiro |
| 2010 Central American and Caribbean Games | (Puerto Rico) Mayagüez | 2 | (Costa Rica) Ashley Binns (Dominican Republic) Johanni Sierra |
| 2011 Pan American Championships ^{1} | (Mexico) Guadalajara | 2 | (Chile) Elizabeth Retamal (Cuba) Yoandra Moreno |
| 2011 North American Karate Championship ^{2} | (Canada) Montreal | 1 | (United States) Cheryl Murphy |
| TOTAL | | 8 | |

=== -68+kg Women ===
| Competition | Location | Vacancies | Qualified |
|---|---|---|---|
| Host | – | 1 | (Mexico) Xhunashi Caballero |
| 2010 South American Games | (Colombia) Medellín | 2 | (Venezuela) Yeisy Pina (Argentina) Perla Salazar |
| 2010 Central American and Caribbean Games | (Puerto Rico) Mayagüez | 2 | (Guatemala) Maria Castellanos (Puerto Rico) Rosa Zavala |
| 2011 Pan American Championships ^{1} | (Mexico) Guadalajara | 2 | (Canada) Olivia Grant (Chile) Claudia Vera |
| Automatic ^{3} | (Mexico) Guadalajara | 1 | (Brazil) Jeanis Colzani ^{5} |
| TOTAL | | 8 | |

- ^1 Countries may only enter athletes in which they have not qualified in.
- ^2 Open to athletes from Canada and the United States only.
- ^3 If an athlete from either Canada or the United States qualify through the Pan American Championship, the other nation automatically gets the North American spot. If both nations qualify, then the top three from the Pan American Championships will earn the spots.
- ^4 If an athlete is injured they may be replaced by another athlete from the same country.
- ^5 There has been a late change in the qualification system which the Canadian federation has appealed.
- ^6 Jesús Rodríguez of Puerto Rico had originally won the spot, but withdrew due to an injury. El Salvador's Carlos Galán will replace him.
