= Sabu (wrestler) =

American professional wrestler (1963–2025)

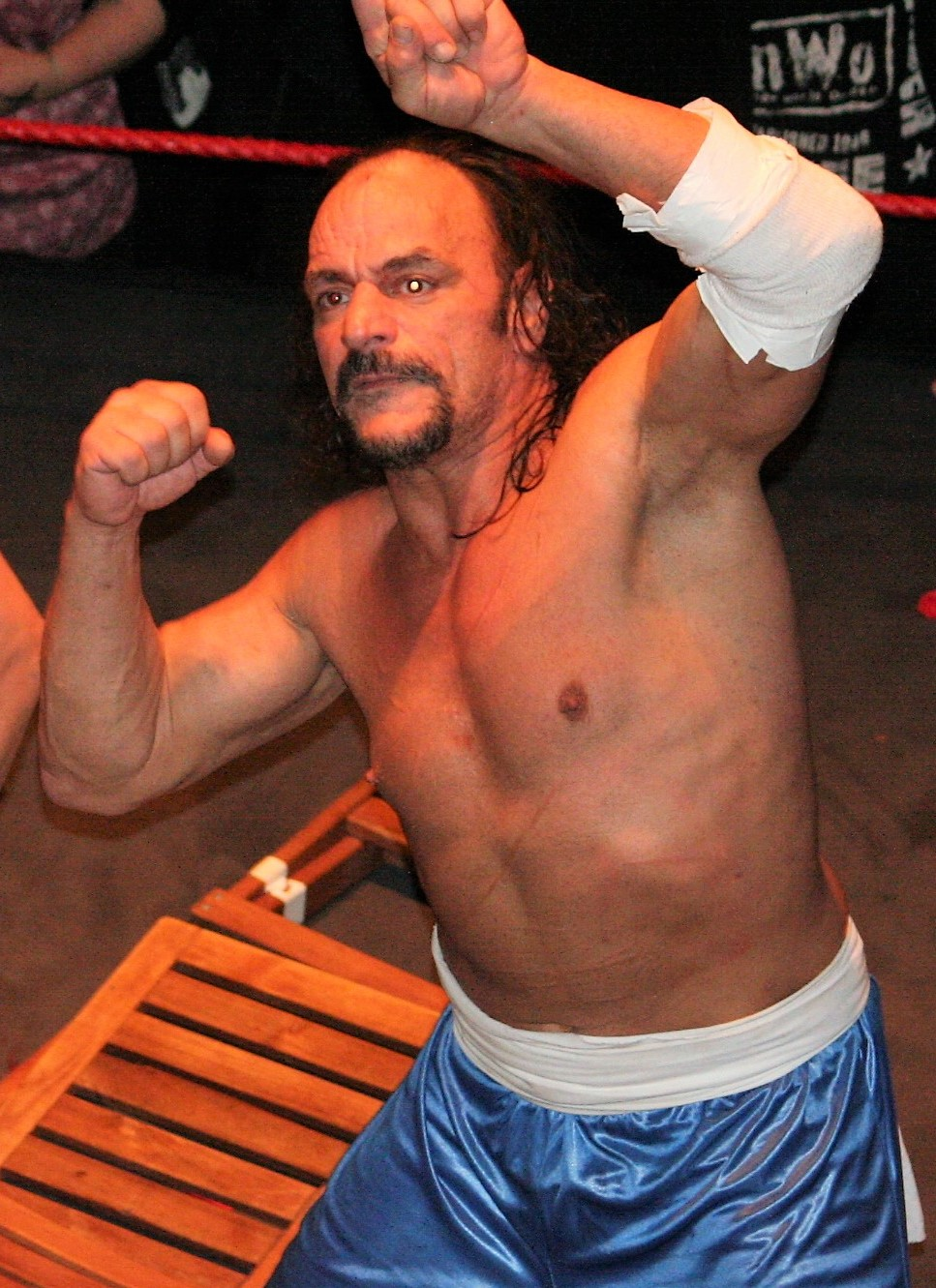
- Sabu in 2017

Personal information
- Born: Terrance Michael Brunk; December 12, 1963 Lansing, Michigan, U.S.
- Died: May 11, 2025 (aged 61) Las Vegas, Nevada, U.S.
- Spouse: Hitomi Brunk (m. 1997)

Professional wrestling career
- Ring name(s): The Great Sabu; Sabu; Sabu the Elephant Boy; Samu; Terry S.R. Terry Snuka; Terry Brunk; Sabu of the Jungle
- Billed height: 6 ft 0 in (183 cm)
- Billed weight: 235 lb (107 kg)
- Billed from: "Bombay, Michigan"; Bombay, India; Saudi Arabia
- Trained by: The Sheik
- Debut: 1985
- Retired: April 18, 2025

Terrance Michael Brunk (December 12, 1963 – May 11, 2025) was an American professional wrestler, better known by his ring name Sabu. He was widely regarded as a pioneer of hardcore wrestling, a reputation built chiefly during his time with Extreme Championship Wrestling (ECW), where his high-risk, weapon-based style helped define the promotion's identity. He was a three-time world champion, having held the ECW World Heavyweight Championship twice and the NWA World Heavyweight Championship once.

Under the tutelage of his uncle Ed "The Sheik" Farhat, Brunk began his career wrestling on the North American independent scene in 1985 under the name of Sabu, before traveling to Japan, competing in Frontier Martial-Arts Wrestling (FMW) and New Japan Pro-Wrestling (NJPW), winning several championships, including the IWGP Junior Heavyweight Championship. He returned to the United States in 1995, briefly working for World Championship Wrestling (WCW), before beginning his most well-known stint in ECW, where he quickly became a fixture of the promotion. During his time in ECW, he became a two-time ECW World Heavyweight Champion and a one-time ECW World Television Champion. He would have both a feud and an alliance with Taz, defeating him for the ECW FTW Championship and winning the ECW World Tag Team Championship with him. In 1997, Sabu began a tag team with Rob Van Dam, winning the ECW Tag Team Championship twice.

After leaving ECW, Sabu wrestled in several national promotions, winning the NWA World Heavyweight Championship for the National Wrestling Alliance in 2000. He also had multiple stints in Total Nonstop Action Wrestling, debuting shortly after its creation in 2002 and making his final appearance in 2020. From 2006 to 2007, he was briefly signed to World Wrestling Entertainment as part of their rebooted version of ECW. He remained a mainstay on the independent circuit for decades, and wrestled his retirement match for Game Changer Wrestling three weeks before his death.

Commentators frequently credited Sabu with popularizing the use of tables as weapons in North American wrestling and with laying the groundwork for the tables, ladders, and chairs match concept. Assessments of his in-ring ability varied considerably during his career, with some regarding him as one of the best American wrestlers of his era and others considering him overrated, though writers generally agreed his influence on the industry's visual style was outsized relative to his championship record. In 2019, Brunk published a memoir, Scars, Silence, & Superglue, co-written with Kenny Casanova, offering his own, often self-critical and occasionally disputed, account of his career.

== Early life ==
Brunk's father was of Irish and German descent, while his mother was of Lebanese descent. His parents divorced when he was three years old, and he was raised primarily by his mother alongside six older siblings; in his memoir, Brunk wrote that his uncle, Ed Farhat, effectively served as his father figure, and that he worked from a young age at a Lebanese-American restaurant in Lansing owned by a cousin. He attended Sexton High School in Lansing, Michigan, where he played football as a 153-pound offensive guard, graduating in 1982.

At the age of 19, Brunk was shot in the face at a house party; some retrospective accounts have described the incident as a mass shooting. In his memoir, Brunk gave a more detailed account of the same incident, dating it to July 18, 1983, at a friend's graduation party in Lansing; he wrote that two other guests were shot by an assailant before he was struck in the mouth while attempting to intervene, and that he later spent four days hospitalized. After being released from the hospital, he began training for a wrestling career under Farhat, reportedly spending months setting up and dismantling the practice ring before he was permitted to wrestle in it.

== Professional wrestling career ==
=== Early career (1985–1991) ===
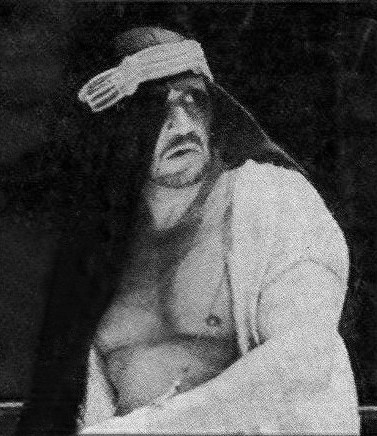
Ed "The Sheik" Farhat, who had been hugely successful during his own career in professional wrestling, was Brunk's father figure and mentor

Brunk had his first professional match in 1985 for Jim Lancaster's Midwest Championship Wrestling, based in Ontario, wrestling under the name "Terry S.R."; contrary to some accounts, his in-ring debut is not believed to have come under his uncle's promotion. He subsequently wrestled for his uncle Ed "The Sheik" Farhat's promotion, Big Time Wrestling, and various other independent promotions through the remainder of the 1980s. According to Brunk, Farhat required him to master a conservative, holds-based style before allowing him to attempt the riskier maneuvers he and training partner Rob Szatkowski (later known as Rob Van Dam) practiced when unsupervised. Farhat later gave his nephew the ring name Sabu, adapted from a character in the 1937 film Elephant Boy, reportedly debuting the persona, complete with a turban, as "Sabu, the Elephant Boy" at a stock-car racetrack in Toledo, Ohio. Brunk gave a somewhat different account of the name's origin in his memoir, writing that it was introduced during a 1991 tour of the United States Wrestling Association based in Memphis, and that Farhat had long wanted to name one of his own sons Sabu after the film but was refused by his wife, subsequently giving the name first to a pet dog and later to Brunk. Over the next few years, Brunk made a few appearances for the USWA in 1991 as Samu, feuding with Jeff Jarrett and Robert Fuller.

=== World Wrestling Federation (1993) ===
Sabu made three appearances for the World Wrestling Federation (WWF) in 1993. He defeated Scott Taylor in a dark match before Monday Night Raw on October 18, lost to Owen Hart the next night for a dark match at a Wrestling Challenge taping, and defeated Taylor again in a dark match at a WWF Superstars of Wrestling taping on October 20. Sabu did not receive a contract offer from the WWF at this time despite the tryout; a WWF deal would not materialize for another thirteen years.

=== Frontier Martial–Arts Wrestling (1991–1994) ===
In 1991, the promotion FMW, led by Atsushi Onita, lured the aging Farhat out of semi-retirement for a tour of Japan on the condition that Sabu accompany him. Recognizing that Japanese audiences favored spectacle over restraint, Farhat reportedly urged his nephew to abandon the conservative style he had been taught and wrestle without limitation, a shift that allowed Sabu's more daredevil tendencies to emerge. While wrestling for FMW, Sabu received many of the scars on his arms and torso for which he became famous. On May 6, 1992, Sabu teamed with his uncle, the Sheik, in a Fire Death Match against Atsushi Onita and Tarzan Goto, where the ring ropes were replaced with flaming barbed wire and covered in towels soaked in kerosene. They were in the ring for about a minute before evacuating due to the intense heat. With his uncle hospitalized, Sabu returned to the ring the following day for a barbed-wire deathmatch in Tokyo, winning an FMW tag team championship in Farhat's absence. His final match in FMW was a loss to the debuting Hayabusa at Summer Spectacular on August 28, 1994.

=== Eastern/Extreme Championship Wrestling (1993–1995) ===
On October 1, 1993, Sabu debuted in Eastern Championship Wrestling (ECW) as a villain at NWA Bloodfest, defeating The Tazmaniac. Sabu's character was an uncontrollable madman who was strapped to a gurney, wore a Hannibal Lecter-style face mask and was accompanied by his handler 911. He rose to main event status in his second match and defeated Shane Douglas to win the ECW Heavyweight Championship. Sabu headlined the inaugural November to Remember event on November 13, teaming with Road Warrior Hawk in a title versus title dream partner tag team match against Terry Funk and King Kong Bundy with Sabu's ECW Heavyweight Championship and Funk's ECW Television Championship on the line, which he won after Bundy turned on Funk, becoming a double champion. Sabu lost the Heavyweight Championship to Funk at Holiday Hell on December 26. He received a rematch for the title in a Three Way Dance at The Night the Line Was Crossed on February 5, 1994, also involving Douglas, which ended in a sixty-minute time limit draw, thus Funk retained the title. Sabu lost the Television Championship to The Tazmaniac, which aired on the March 15 episode of Hardcore TV. At When Worlds Collide on May 14, Sabu and Bobby Eaton defeated Funk and Arn Anderson, ending their feud.

At Heat Wave on July 16, Sabu turned into a fan favorite by forming a tag team with Tazmaniac to defeat The Pitbulls. Later that night, Sabu faced Douglas for the Heavyweight Championship, but lost via count-out. Sabu and Tazmaniac would begin feuding with The Triple Threat (Douglas, Chris Benoit and Dean Malenko), which led to Sabu facing Benoit in the main event of November to Remember on November 5, headlining ECW's premier event for the second consecutive year. The match ended early when Benoit gave Sabu a back body drop, and Sabu over-rotated in midair as he tried to land on his back. This injured Sabu's spinal cord, resulting in nerve damage. In his memoir, Brunk wrote that he bore Benoit no lasting ill will over the injury, describing it as an in-ring accident rather than a deliberate act, and recalled that Benoit visited him in the hospital and later gave him his first painkillers outside of a prescription.

On February 4, 1995, Sabu and Tazmaniac defeated The Public Enemy (Johnny Grunge and Rocco Rock) to win the ECW World Tag Team Championship in a double tables match at Double Tables. They lost the titles to Benoit and Malenko three weeks later at Return of the Funker. Sabu wrestled his last match of his first tenure in ECW on the March 28 episode of Hardcore TV by defeating Mikey Whipwreck. In April, after being scheduled to compete in the main event of Three Way Dance for the World Tag Team Championship, Sabu no–showed the event to accept a booking in Japan for New Japan Pro-Wrestling (NJPW), which led Paul Heyman to publicly and legitimately fire Sabu at the event. Accounts of the episode differ. According to Heyman, Sabu repeatedly assured him in the days beforehand that he would honor the ECW date, only for Heyman to learn otherwise from Sabu's answering machine message stating he had already left for Japan; Sabu maintained he had told Heyman of his plans in advance. With Sabu absent, Heyman addressed the sold-out ECW Arena alongside Taz to explain the situation, and the crowd responded to Sabu's name with chants of disapproval. In his memoir, Brunk framed the decision primarily in financial terms, writing that the New Japan contract paid roughly five times what he was earning from ECW at the time, and did not directly address Heyman's account of the phone calls.

=== New Japan Pro-Wrestling (1995) ===
Sabu wrestled for New Japan Pro-Wrestling (NJPW) throughout 1995, making his debut on January 4 in the Tokyo Dome, teaming with Masahiro Chono to defeat Junji Hirata and Tatsumi Fujinami. Brunk wrote in his memoir that he first sought the New Japan opportunity himself by contacting NJPW referee and matchmaker Tiger Hattori, and that Farhat and Onita both gave their blessing for him to leave FMW once the offer was confirmed, viewing it as a step up for his career. On May 3, Sabu defeated Koji Kanemoto at Wrestling Dontaku in the Fukuoka Dome to win the IWGP Junior Heavyweight Championship. He lost the title to Kanemoto on June 14 in Tokyo's Nippon Budokan in a bout where Kanemoto's UWA World Welterweight Championship was also on the line. Sabu was vocal in rejecting the "junior heavyweight" label despite holding the title, a stance that, according to Pollock, may have factored into New Japan's decision to move the championship off him within a month. Two days after winning the IWGP Junior Heavyweight title, Farhat wrestled what proved to be his final full match, against Terry Funk at Kawasaki Stadium; Brunk wrote that his uncle suffered a heart attack shortly afterward while waiting for a taxi and was hospitalized in Japan, effectively ending his in-ring career, and that he rushed to the hospital and remained at his bedside through the ordeal. He also defeated Gran Hamada to win the UWA World Junior Light Heavyweight Championship on November 23 in the Todoroki Arena in Kawasaki, which he lost to El Samurai on December 1 in Niigata City. Sabu made his final appearance with NJPW in Osaka on December 11, teaming with Hiro Saito to defeat Dean Malenko and Wild Pegasus.

=== World Championship Wrestling (1995) ===
As World Championship Wrestling prepared to launch Monday Nitro in September 1995, booker Kevin Sullivan sought to bring in workhorse talent, including Sabu and Chris Benoit; the same period saw Dean Malenko and Eddie Guerrero leave ECW for WCW as well, thinning ECW's roster. Sabu made his WCW debut on the September 11, 1995 episode of WCW Monday Nitro against Alex Wright. Sabu won the match, but the decision was reversed when, after the match, he put Wright through a table. Sabu defeated Mr. J.L. on the October 9 episode of Nitro and at Halloween Havoc on October 29; following the latter match, Sabu's uncle Sheik shot J.L. in the face with his trademark fireball. His last match in WCW was a victory against Disco Inferno on the October 30 episode of Nitro. Pollock characterized Sabu's brief WCW tenure as a mismatch between performer and promotion, noting that the group's established stars had little interest in his style.

=== Big Japan and All Japan Pro Wrestling (1996–1997) ===
Sabu returned to Japan to work for Big Japan Pro Wrestling in March 1996, where he embarked on an 18-match winning streak, first defeating Jason Knight on March 13 until June 4, when he lost to Kazuo Sakurada's Kendo Nagasaki. He made his debut for All Japan Pro Wrestling in November 1996, initially teaming with Gary Albright before teaming with Rob Van Dam the following year.

=== Return to ECW (1995–2000) ===
==== Various feuds (1995–1997) ====
On November 18, 1995, Sabu returned to ECW at November to Remember, defeating Hack Meyers in his first match in the promotion in eight months, to a positive reception from the same fans who had chanted against him following his abrupt departure earlier that year. He would embark on a winning streak against the likes of Cactus Jack at Holiday Hell on December 29, Stevie Richards at House Party on January 5, and Mr. Hughes at Big Apple Blizzard Blast on February 3. He faced 2 Cold Scorpio for the World Television Championship at CyberSlam on February 17, Just Another Night on February 23, and Big Ass Extreme Bash on March 8, but the matches ended in twenty-minute time limit draws.

Sabu defeated Rob Van Dam on April 20 at Hostile City Showdown. Van Dam refused to shake hands with him after the match, leading to a respect match at A Matter of Respect on May 11, which Sabu lost. He was forced to shake hands with Van Dam, who refused by saying "not only do I not respect you, you're a piece of shit". Sabu defeated Van Dam at Hardcore Heaven on June 22, in a stretcher match at The Doctor Is In on August 3, and at Unlucky Lottery on September 13, after which Sabu finally earned Van Dam's respect. Van Dam was about to shake Sabu's hand until they were both attacked by The Can-Am Express. Their match against the Can-Am Express on September 14 at When Worlds Collide ended in a thirty-minute time limit draw, but they defeated them in a rematch at High Incident on October 26. Sabu and Van Dam failed to win the ECW Tag Team Championship from The Eliminators in a Tables and Ladders match on February 21, 1997 at CyberSlam; this bout was later cited by WWE as a direct precursor to the modern tables, ladders, and chairs match concept. At this time, Sabu's former tag team partner Tazmaniac (who had shortened his name to "Taz") began to publicly challenge Sabu at every given opportunity, but got no response. After a year of call-outs and insults from Taz, Paul Heyman revealed that he had asked Sabu, as a friend, to ignore Taz's challenge. This culminated in a match on April 13 at ECW's first pay-per-view, Barely Legal, which Taz won. Following the match, Taz's manager Bill Alfonso turned on him and sided with Sabu and Van Dam. This resulted in a double turn as Taz became a fan favorite while Sabu turned heel; he defeated Taz in a rematch on June 6 at Wrestlepalooza.

At Born to be Wired on August 9, Sabu competed in a no-rope barbed wire match against Terry Funk for the ECW World Heavyweight Championship, which was promoted as being "too extreme even for ECW". In one of the most memorable moments in ECW history, Sabu attempted the "Air Sabu" corner splash on Funk, but he moved and Sabu collided violently into the wire, tearing open his bicep. He then asked his manager Bill Alfonso for some tape, which he used to tape up the roughly 10-inch gash, a wound that reportedly later required about 100 stitches. Sabu ultimately defeated Funk to win the title for a second time; the match ended with both men so badly tangled up together in the barbed wire that it took several ring technicians armed with wire cutters to free them. In his own autobiography, Terry Funk recalled that the encounter left him convinced he was facing an unusually tough opponent, and Heyman later said in a WWE DVD release that the match was so gruesome he never booked another barbed-wire match. At Hardcore Heaven on August 17, Sabu lost the title to Shane Douglas in a three-way elimination match also involving Funk.

==== Teaming with Rob Van Dam (1997–2000) ====
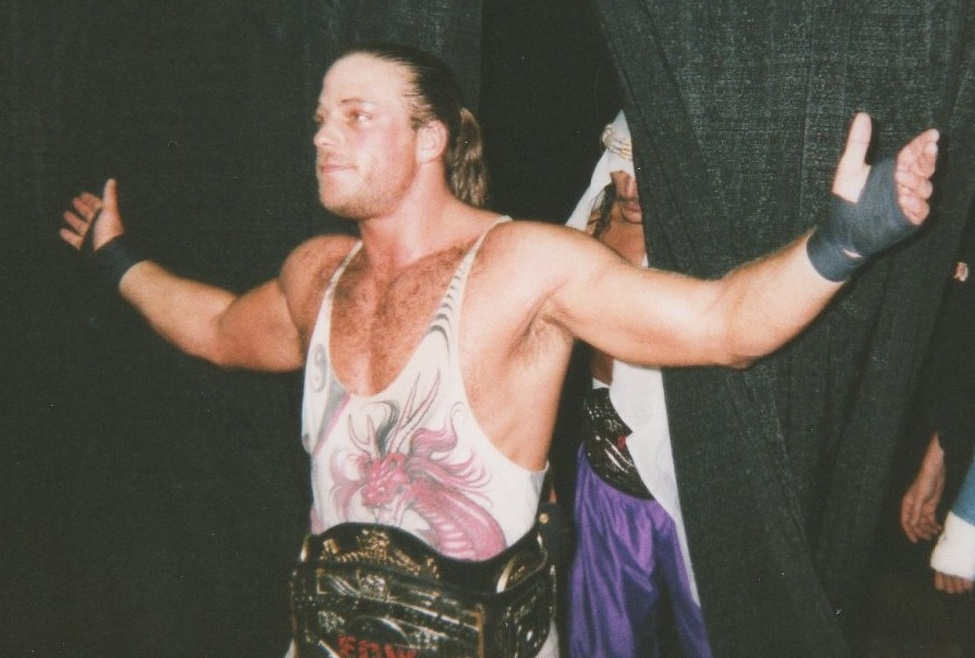
Sabu and Rob Van Dam, seen here as ECW World Tag Team champions in 1998. Throughout his life and career, Van Dam was Sabu's closest friend.

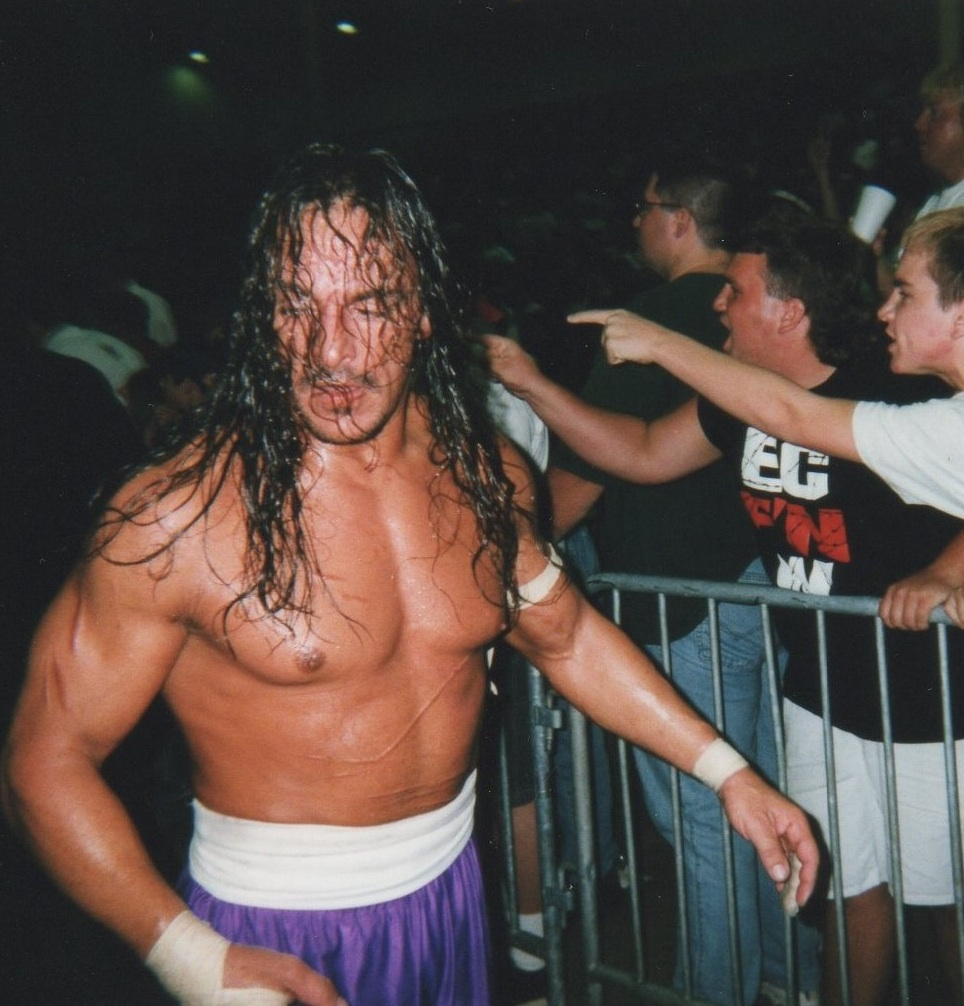
Sabu at an ECW event in 1998

In mid-1997, Sabu was included in the WWF invasion angle, in which ECW wrestlers invaded WWF's Monday Night Raw program and held ECW-style matches and angles on the show. One memorable moment occurred when Sabu appeared during a match and performed an aerial move off the "R" in the "RAW" lettered entryway onto Team Taz members. He and Van Dam defeated ECW loyalists Tommy Dreamer and The Sandman at Orgy of Violence on June 28. On July 24, Sabu and Van Dam teamed with Jerry Lawler to face Dreamer, Sandman and Rick Rude in a steel cage match at Heat Wave. The match ended in a no contest after Rude turned on his teammates and attacked them. Sabu defeated Sandman in a Tables and Ladders match at November to Remember on November 30, lost to him in a Stairway to Hell match at House Party on January 10, and defeated him again in a Dueling Canes match at Living Dangerously on March 1, 1998 to conclude the rivalry. Shortly after the event, Sabu and Van Dam turned into fan favorites. At Wrestlepalooza on May 3, Sabu challenged Van Dam for the World Television Championship, but the match ended in a thirty-minute time limit draw.

On the July 1 episode of Hardcore TV, Sabu and Van Dam defeated Chris Candido and Lance Storm to win the World Tag Team Championship, beginning Sabu's second individual reign with the title. Sabu and Van Dam held the title for nearly four months, retaining the titles against various ECW teams such as Hardcore Chair Swingin' Freaks (Axl Rotten and Balls Mahoney), Full Blooded Italians, and The Dudley Boyz throughout the summer. They also defeated the Japanese team of Hayabusa and Jinsei Shinzaki at Heat Wave. Sabu and Van Dam lost the titles to the Dudley Boyz on the October 28 episode of Hardcore TV. Around the same time, they joined forces with former rival Taz to feud with The Triple Threat and formed a short-lived alliance to counter the faction called New Triple Threat. On November 1, at November to Remember, New Triple Threat defeated The Triple Threat in a six-man tag team match.

At the ECW/FMW Supershow II in Japan on December 13, Sabu and Van Dam defeated the Dudley Boyz to win their second World Tag Team Championship, marking Sabu's third individual title reign. The Japan tour also served as the occasion for Farhat's formal retirement ceremony, held on December 11 at Korakuen Hall, at which Onita presented him with a commemorative championship belt; Brunk wrote that a separate Japanese-style wedding ceremony he held with his first wife, Hitomi, took place the following day at Sensō-ji temple in Tokyo, a detail that conflicts with earlier reporting placing a Japanese ceremony in 1997. On the December 23 episode of Hardcore TV, Sabu defeated Taz and Justin Credible in a three-way elimination match to win the FTW Heavyweight Championship after Taz put Sabu on top of him. Van Dam and Sabu retained the titles against Hardcore Chair Swingin' Freaks at House Party on January 16, 1999. Sabu and Taz competed in a falls count anywhere title unification match for Sabu's FTW Championship and Taz's ECW World Heavyweight Championship at Living Dangerously on March 21, which Taz won to unify both titles. Sabu would begin wearing a neck brace and take some time off, resulting in his partner Van Dam defending the World Tag Team Championship against D-Von Dudley in a singles match on the April 23 episode of Hardcore TV, which D-Von won. As a result, the Dudley Boyz won the titles. Sabu then defeated Justin Credible at Anarchy Rulz on September 19.

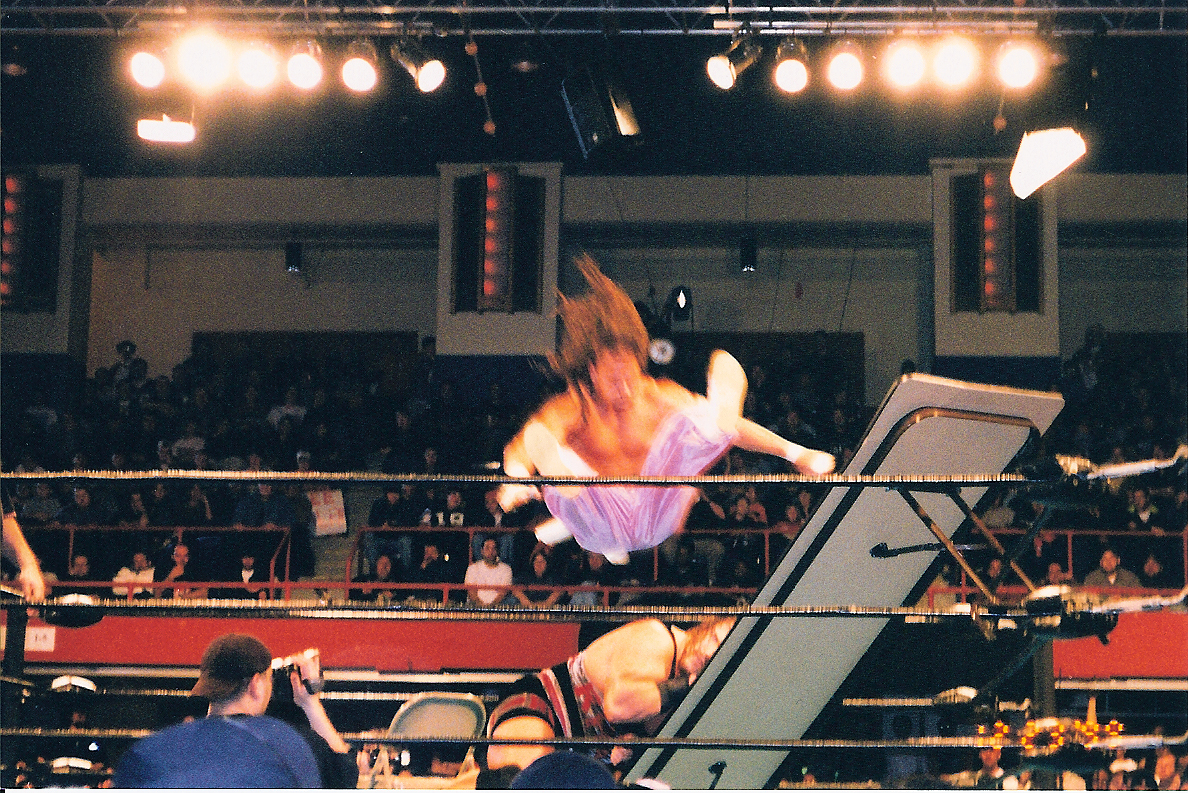
Sabu delivering the Arabian Skullcrusher to Rhyno in December 1999

Sabu failed to win the World Television Championship from Van Dam on the November 19 episode of Hardcore TV and the November 26 episode of ECW on TNN. After defeating Chris Candido on November 7 at November to Remember, Sabu again failed to win the title at Guilty as Charged on January 9, 2000, in his final ECW pay-per-view appearance. On the January 29 episode of Hardcore TV, Sabu wrestled his last televised match in ECW, in which he defeated C.W. Anderson. Sabu left ECW following a victory over Scott D'Amore on February 26. Around this time, Sabu was reportedly in negotiations for a multi-year contract with WCW worth approximately $400,000 annually under newly installed head booker Kevin Sullivan, which would have represented the largest deal of his career; however, Heyman, upon learning of the talks, threatened legal action against WCW on the grounds that Sabu remained under contract to ECW, and the deal was withdrawn. Sabu gave a different account of the deal's collapse in a 2020 interview with Mike Johnson of PWInsider, saying that his mother died shortly after WCW extended the offer, and that by the time he had dealt with her funeral arrangements the contract was no longer on the table; Johnson noted that this version of events could not be independently verified.

=== Independent circuit (2000–2005) ===
After leaving ECW, Sabu went to compete on the independent circuit for promotions such as Xtreme Pro Wrestling, IWA Mid-South, Stampede Wrestling and Border City Wrestling. On April 29, 2000, he won a tournament for the vacated XPW World Heavyweight Championship. He was the only champion to defend the title outside of the United States. Sabu was stripped off the title in May 2001 after he was not present for an event. He also returned to All Japan Pro Wrestling in 2000 and 2001 as a singles competitor. In his memoir, Brunk wrote that it was during his time with Xtreme Pro Wrestling around this period that he first met Melissa Coates, then involved in bodybuilding and fitness rather than wrestling, who would later become his manager and, separately, his longtime partner. In 2002, he worked for Pro-Pain Pro Wrestling, winning the 3PW World Heavyweight Championship by defeating Gary Wolfe on October 19. He lost the title to Wolfe on December 28.

After Sabu suffered a legitimate back injury, Brunk contracted a virus and was hospitalized, reportedly leaving him temporarily paralyzed and sidelining him for ten months. On December 12, a benefit show, A Night of Appreciation for Sabu, was held by the AWWL to raise funds for him. The show was considered a success, raising enough money for Brunk to cover the costs of his medical care and make a full recovery. Sabu appeared at Hardcore Homecoming on June 10, where he defeated Terry Funk and Shane Douglas in a three-way no-ropes barbed wire match,

=== Return to Frontier Martial–Arts Wrestling (1997–2002) ===
Sabu returned to Frontier Martial-Arts Wrestling on December 22, 1997, when he defeated ECW rival The Sandman at Super Extreme Wrestling War 1997 at Tokyo's Korakuen Hall. Then on December 13, 1998, he and Rob Van Dam defeated the Dudley Boyz to retain the ECW World Tag Team Titles at ECW/FMW Supershow. He would team up with Super Leather in a few tag team matches during 1999.

On February 3, 2002, Sabu defeated former ECW wrestlers The Sandman and Vic Grimes in a three-way dance. The next day was his last match with FMW was when he teamed with Tetsuhiro Kuroda and lost to The Sandman and Kodo Fuyuki for the vacated WEW Tag Team titles. This would be the promotion last event as it went bankrupt on the 15th.

=== World Wrestling All-Stars (2002, 2003) ===
Sabu competed for the World Wrestling All-Stars (WWA) in a number of events during 2002 and 2003. This included four appearances on PPV and a number of memorable matches. His first appearance was at Revolution PPV in Las Vegas in February 2002. He faced Devon Storm in a hardcore match. He was defeated in this match after his manager Bill Alfonso accidentally hit him with a chair after Storm moved out the way. After the match Sabu and Storm continued to fight onto the ring entrance way. Sabu placed Storm on a table and leaped from the entrance way through Storm and the table. This feud continued on the next PPV, the Eruption, in Australia in April. Sabu fought Storm in a steel cage match. The action spilled out of the ring and the cage with Sabu gaining the victory after leaping from the top of the cage through Storm, who was placed on top of two tables on top of each other.

Next up Sabu took part in WWA European tour of November–December 2002. This included the Retribution PPV in Glasgow, which was broadcast two months later in February 2003. On this tour and PPV he fought former fellow ECW stars Perry Saturn and Simon Diamond in a three-way hardcore match. Sabu took the victory in each of these matches, usually gaining the pinfall over Diamond after Saturn left the match to defend his companion. His final appearance for the WWA came in their last PPV, The Reckoning, in New Zealand. During this tour he first fought Shane Douglas but due to injury he did not face him at the PPV. Instead, Douglas came to the ring and eventually allowed Joe E Legend to face Sabu instead. Sabu won this match, his second and last WWA match ever. When the All World Wrestling League began in April 2003 (a spin-off of Big Time Wrestling), which was run by Eddie & Tom Farhat, Sabu joined them for a while, before he left for another territory.

=== Total Nonstop Action Wrestling (2002–2006) ===
Sabu debuted in Total Nonstop Action Wrestling (TNA) on July 17, 2002, defeating Malice in a ladder match. The following week, he faced Ken Shamrock in a ladder match which ended in a no contest after interference from Malice.

On February 25, 2004, Sabu teamed with Raven to defeat Raven's former "Gathering" protégés CM Punk and Julio Dinero. The following month, he began feuding with Monty Brown and Abyss, who outnumbered him on several occasions after Raven failed to "watch his back". Sabu was eventually challenged to a match by Raven, but he refused to wrestle Raven as part of a promise he made to his uncle Ed "The Sheik" Farhat. Raven tormented Sabu by assaulting his friend Sonjay Dutt and waging a campaign against Sabu by disrespecting his uncle's memory, causing him to finally attack Raven on July 23. On August 4, Sabu lost to Raven, and a scheduled return match on August 18 was canceled after Sabu suffered a legitimate back injury.

Sabu returned to TNA on July 29, 2005. Pollock later characterized this stretch as arguably the best in-ring run of Sabu's career, crediting his adaptation to TNA's mix of high-flying X Division wrestling and big-man brawling. At Sacrifice on August 14, Sabu teamed with old rival and then-NWA World Heavyweight Champion Raven to face Jeff Jarrett and Rhino. During the match, which Rhino and Jarrett won, Abyss interfered and attacked Sabu, starting a feud between the two. At Unbreakable on September 11, Abyss defeated Sabu after performing his Black Hole Slam finisher onto a pile of tacks in the ring. On October 23, at Bound for Glory, Sabu lost to Rhino in a Monster's Ball match also involving Abyss and Jeff Hardy, as well as in a ten-man gauntlet match later that night. Sabu again lost to Abyss on November 13 at Genesis, before defeating him in the promotion's first ever Barbed Wire Massacre at Turning Point on December 11, ending their feud. The bout was later named TNA's Match of the Year and took place one day before Brunk's 41st birthday. After a hiatus, Sabu, having a broken forearm, returned at Lockdown on April 23, 2006, facing Samoa Joe for the TNA X Division Championship in a losing effort; he was released from TNA following this match.

=== World Wrestling Entertainment (2005, 2006–2007) ===
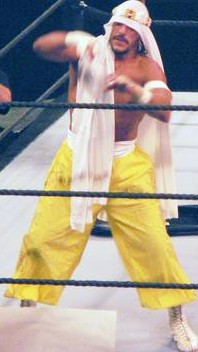
Sabu in the ring at a WWE house show in 2006

At ECW One Night Stand, Sabu defeated Rhyno. On April 23, 2006, Sabu signed a one-year contract with World Wrestling Entertainment (WWE). At ECW One Night Stand on June 11, Sabu faced Rey Mysterio for the World Heavyweight Championship, but the match ended in a no contest after Sabu caught Mysterio in a front facelock and hit him with a DDT which caused both men to crash through a table. WWE medical staff rushed to the injured men and declared neither of them could continue, thus Mysterio retained his title.

On the June 13 premiere of ECW on Sci Fi, Sabu won a 10-man Extreme Battle Royal to earn a match against John Cena at Vengeance. Sabu lost to Cena in their "Extreme Lumberjack match" at Vengeance on June 25. On July 2, while traveling with fellow ECW wrestler Rob Van Dam, he was arrested and charged with possession of drug paraphernalia and nine Vicodin tablets on U.S. Route 52 in Hanging Rock, Ohio. Sources differ on the specific medication involved: contemporaneous local reporting described the pills as Vicodin, while a later retrospective account described them as an anti-estrogen medication not on WWE's banned-substance list, which the outlet cited as the reason Brunk was fined rather than suspended. In his memoir, Brunk identified his own pills specifically as nine tablets of testolactone, an anti-estrogen drug, and wrote that Van Dam was separately found with roughly eighteen grams of marijuana and five Vicodin tablets in the same vehicle. Brunk wrote that he offered to publicly take sole responsibility for the arrest to protect Van Dam's push at the top of the WWE card, an offer he said Van Dam declined. Brunk was fined $1,000 based on the guidelines of WWE's Wellness Policy. He pleaded guilty to possession of a controlled substance and the charge of possession of drug paraphernalia was dropped. He was given a suspended sentence of 10 days in jail and a $500 fine.

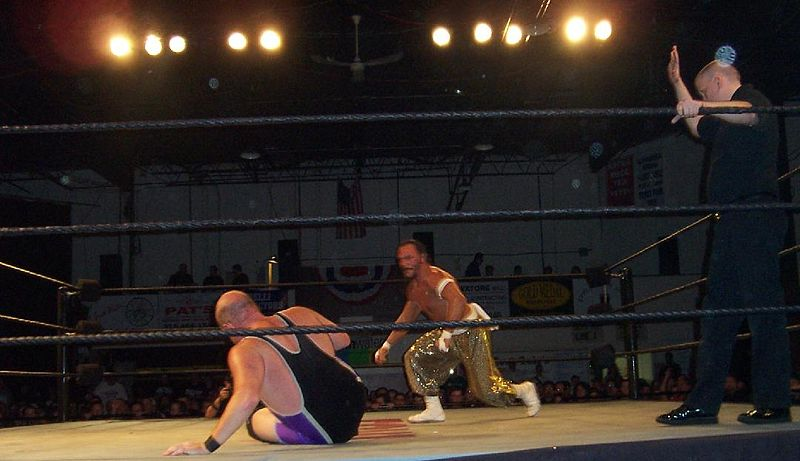
Sabu wrestling C. W. Anderson at the ECW Arena in June 2006

Towards the end of July, Sabu began to talk on camera for himself – instead of using a go between – and demanded a shot at Big Show's ECW World Championship which Paul Heyman refused to grant him in order to "protect" his champion. Instead, he forced him into a match against the returning Kurt Angle to determine a number one contender, which ended in a no contest after interference from the returning Van Dam. On the August 15 episode of ECW, Sabu defeated Van Dam in a ladder match to earn the title match against Big Show at SummerSlam on August 20, which he lost. At Survivor Series on November 26, Sabu was a part of Team Cena (John Cena, Bobby Lashley, Kane and Van Dam), defeating Team Big Show (Big Show, Montel Vontavious Porter, Finlay, Test and Umaga); he eliminated Test but was eliminated by Big Show. At December to Dismember on December 3, Sabu was originally set to appear in the main event, an Extreme Elimination Chamber match for the ECW World Championship, but was "taken out" and replaced by Hardcore Holly. The following episode on ECW, after Punk and Van Dam defeated Test and Holly in a match they dedicated to Sabu, Heyman and his security team came out and beat them down until Sabu, with a heavily wrapped arm, returned to save them.

On January 28, 2007 at Royal Rumble, Sabu made his Royal Rumble match debut at number 7, but was eliminated by Kane after receiving a chokeslam over the top rope and through a table. Sabu then joined the ECW Originals along with Van Dam, Tommy Dreamer and The Sandman and feuded with the New Breed (Elijah Burke, Kevin Thorn, Marcus Cor Von and Matt Striker), defeating them at WrestleMania 23 on April 1 in front of more than 75,000 fans at Ford Field in Detroit, Farhat's old home territory, but lost a rematch two nights later on ECW. Sabu's final WWE match was on the May 1 episode of ECW, where he competed in a fatal four-way match against Dreamer, Van Dam and Sandman to determine the number one contender for the ECW World Championship, which Van Dam won. On May 16, Sabu was released from his WWE contract.

=== Independent circuit (2007–2010) ===
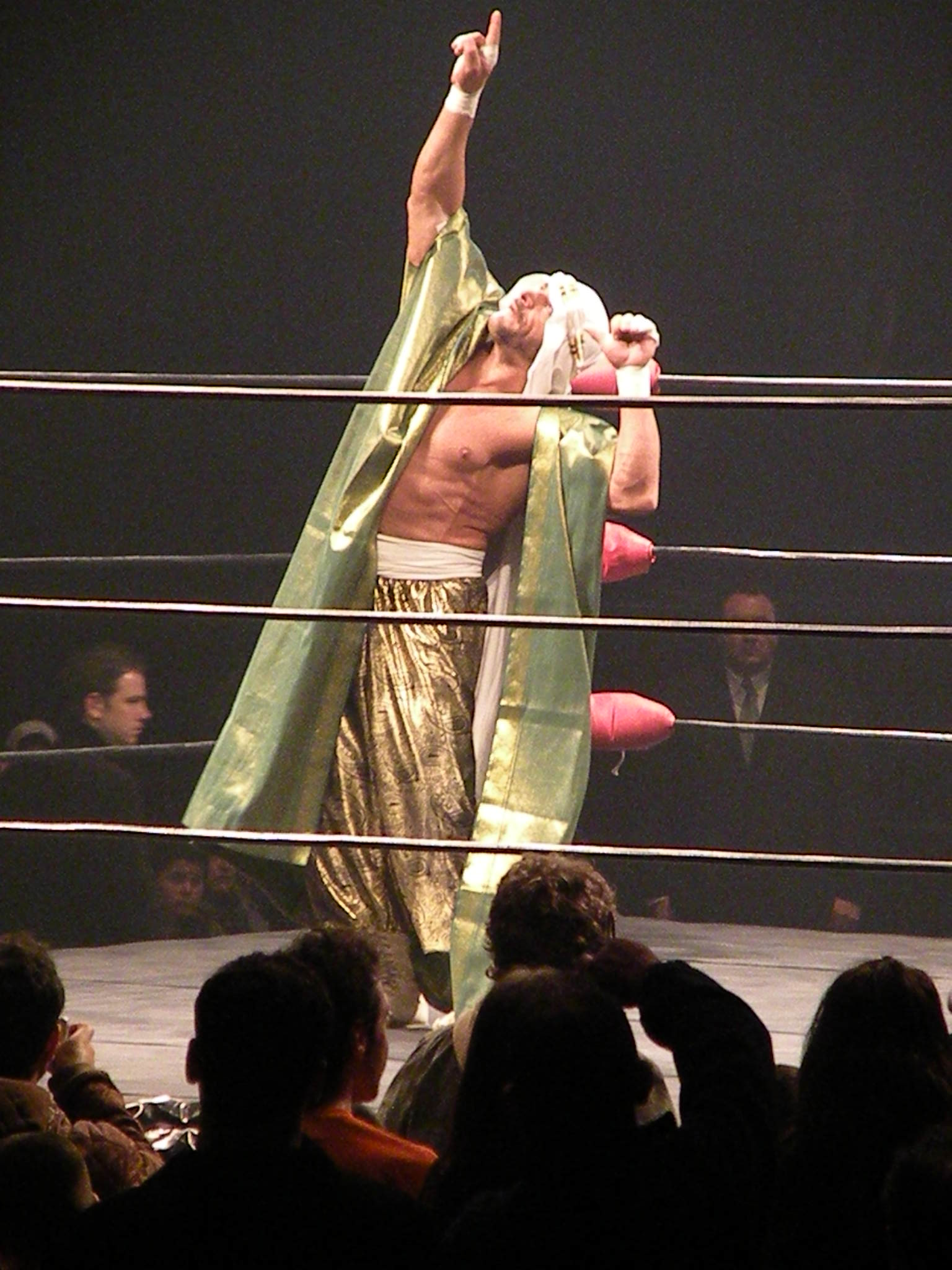
Sabu performing his signature taunt in 2009

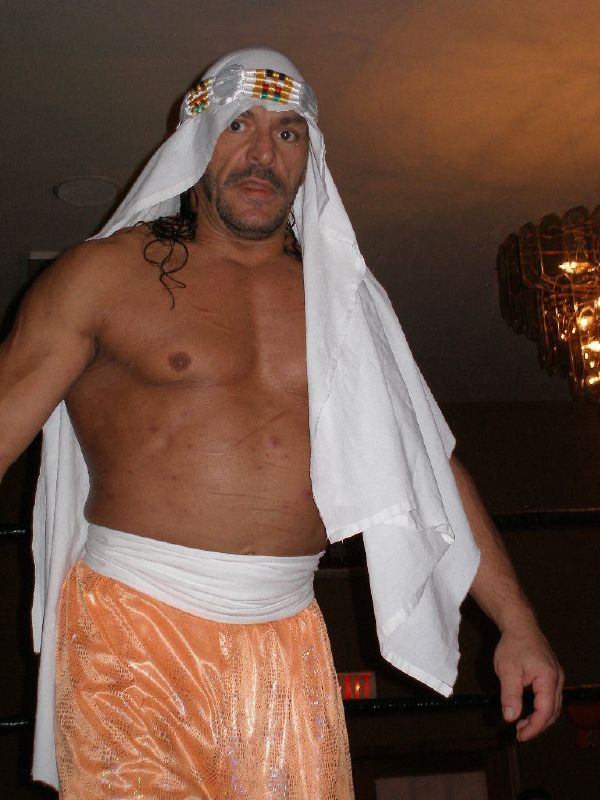
Sabu in 2008

On July 13, 2007, it was announced that Sabu would be working in Mexico's AAA promotion in Mexico for their Triplemanía XV event. Sabu came out during the main event and put La Parka through a table, joining forces with the heels X-Pack, Ron "The Truth" Killings, and Konnan. Thereafter, he made appearances on their major televised programs on Galavision as a minor part of Konnan's heel stable, La Legión Extranjera. On October 30, 2010, Sabu defeated Damián 666 to win Xtreme Latin American Wrestling's International Championship.

=== Juggalo Championship Wrestling (2007–2011) ===
In 2007, Sabu teamed with Insane Clown Posse to defeat Trent Acid and the Young Alter Boys at Juggalo Championship Wrestling's Bloodymania. During the second season of the company's internet wrestling show SlamTV!, Raven was involved in a feud with JCW Heavyweight Champion Corporal Robinson. In the third episode, Sabu appeared from out of the crowd and saved Robinson from an attack by Raven and his lackey Sexy Slim Goody. Raven and Goody teamed up against Robinson and Sabu in the following episode, but Raven fled from the match. At Bloodymania III, Sabu defeated Raven in a Raven's Rules match. He returned as a full-time member of the roster at Oddball Wrestling 2010, where he defeated Officer Colt Cabana in an "I Quit" match. Following two victories, Sabu teamed with The Weedman to defeat Bull Pain and Isabella Smothers at Hardcore Hell. After the match, per narrative thread, he aligned himself with villainous manager Charlie Brown. Sabu defeated heroic face 2 Tuff Tony at the next event, and continued to attack him after the match ended. He and Tony wrestled again at Up in Smoke in a match where Rob Conway was hired by Brown to attack Tony. After Rhino scared off Sabu and Conway, a tag team match was scheduled between the two and Rhino and Tony at St. Andrew's Brawl.

=== Return to TNA (2010) ===
On August 2, 2010, it was confirmed that Sabu would be taking part in TNA's ECW reunion show against TNA World Heavyweight Champion Rob Van Dam in the main event of Hardcore Justice on August 8, which he lost. On the following edition of Impact!, the ECW alumni, known collectively as Extreme, Version 2.0 (EV 2.0), were assaulted by A.J. Styles, Kazarian, Robert Roode, James Storm, Douglas Williams and Matt Morgan of Ric Flair's Fourtune stable, who thought they did not deserve to be in TNA. The following week, TNA president Dixie Carter gave each member of EV 2.0 TNA contracts in order for them to settle their score with Fourtune. At No Surrender on September 5, Sabu unsuccessfully challenged Williams for the TNA X Division Championship. At Bound for Glory on October 10, Sabu, Tommy Dreamer, Raven, Rhino and Stevie Richards defeated Fortune members Styles, Kazarian, Morgan, Roode and Storm in a Lethal Lockdown match. On the October 21 edition of Impact!, Sabu and Van Dam lost to Storm and Roode after Sabu accidentally hit Van Dam with a chair. After the match, Van Dam and Sabu began shoving each other, before being broken up by the rest of EV 2.0. At Turning Point on November 7, EV 2.0 faced Fortune in a ten-man tag team match, where each member of EV 2.0 put their TNA careers on the line. Styles won the match for his team by pinning Sabu, who as a result was fired from TNA. It had been reported earlier that Brunk's release from TNA was legitimate.

=== Return to independent circuit (2012–2021) ===
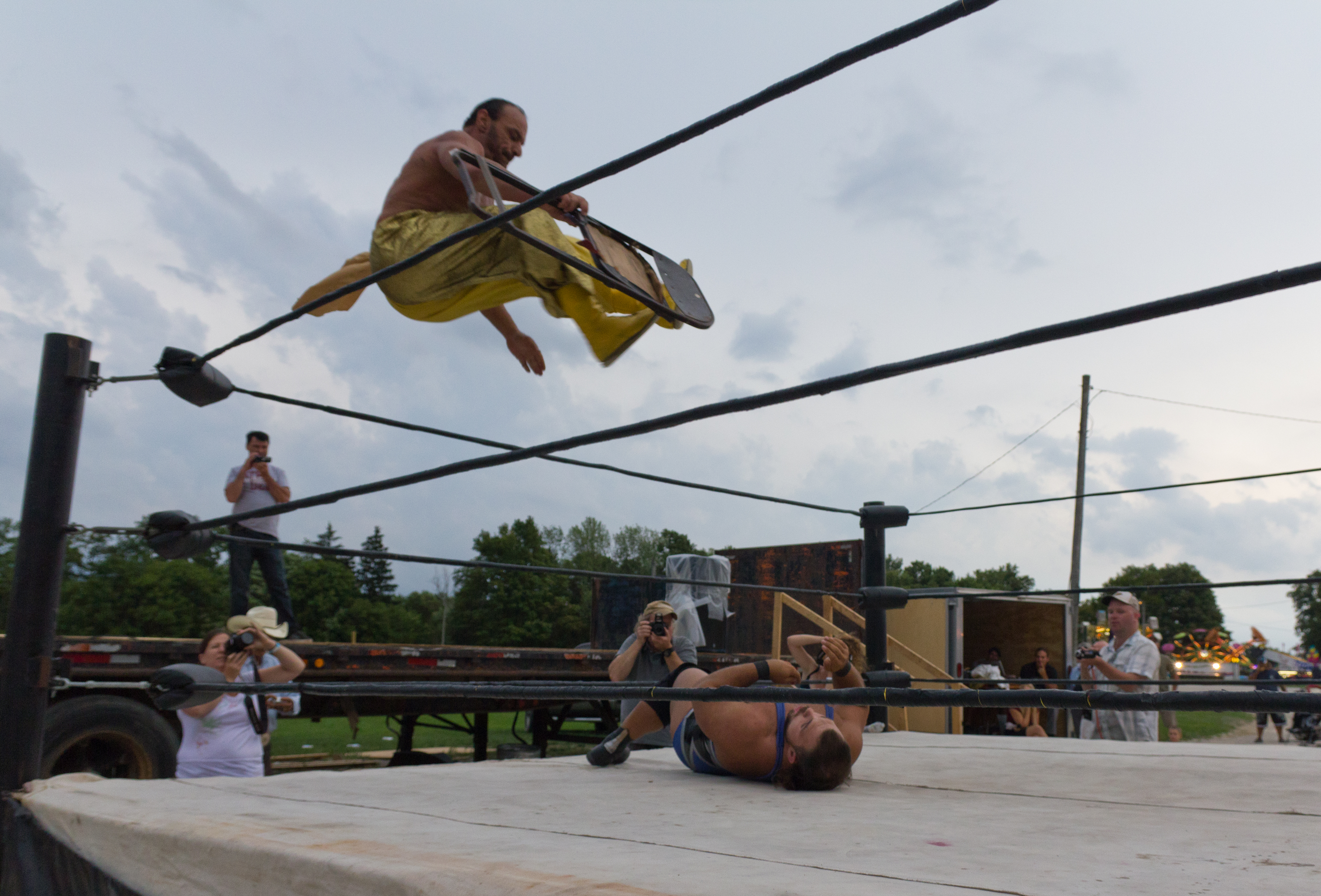
Sabu performing his Arabian Facebuster on Michael Elgin in August 2011

On January 14, 2012, Sabu returned to the former ECW Arena, when he defeated Justin Credible at an Evolve event in the venue's final professional wrestling event. In 2013, Sabu completed a UK tour, wrestling for a number of the UK's top promotions. Sabu entered the Extreme Rising World Championship tournament but was eliminated in the first round by Devon Storm.

On March 30, 2013, Sabu made his Newfoundland wrestling debut when he wrestled in the Newfoundland and Labrador based company's CEW "King Of The Rock" tournament. This was a two-show event which saw Sabu defeat multiple CEW mainstays such as CEW headliners Psycho Mitch and Krys Krysmon. Sabu ultimately lost the tournament after a brutal match with Scott Gotch in which Sabu lost intentionally at the request of CEW owner Dennis Guthrie. As a reward, CEW owner enshrined Sabu as the new CEW Newfoundland Heritage Champion. He defended his title in a Fatal Four-Way elimination match on April 1, 2013, for CEW in St. Lawrence, NL against Justin Lock, Tony King and Brandon Flip. In Scotland, Sabu challenged Jack Jester for the ICW Heavyweight Championship but was defeated. Sabu returned to ICW in 2015 to continue his feud with Jester and challenge the ICW World Heavyweight Champion Drew Galloway but was again defeated.

Sabu also worked for Pro Wrestling Holland, where he held the PWH Championship. On October 18, 2014, at Insurrection, Sabu defeated Balls Mahoney to win the WWL Extreme Championship. He lost the title against Monster Pain. He also wrestled for the Big Time Wrestling independent circuit.

On June 5, 2015, Sabu lost a match to his long-time partner Rob Van Dam in Scranton, Pennsylvania. At the end of the match, after pinning Sabu, RVD helped him up off the mat and both raised hands together.

On August 17, 2018, Sabu lost to Nick Gage at a GCW event.

On November 5, 2021, Sabu officially announced his retirement from professional wrestling.

=== Second return to Impact Wrestling (2019, 2020) ===
On February 8, 2019, it was revealed that Sabu would return to TNA, now named Impact Wrestling, at United We Stand on April 4, where Sabu and Rob Van Dam were defeated by the Lucha Bros (Pentagón Jr. and Fénix). On the May 31 episode of Impact, Sabu, Rob Van Dam and Tommy Dreamer defeated The North and Moose. On the June 6 episode of Impact, Sabu and Rob Van Dam lost to The North (Ethan Page and Josh Alexander). on the July 20 episode of Xplosion, Sabu defeated Raj Singh. On September 4, it was reported that Impact would bring him back for more dates in the future. Two days later, Sabu fought Rohit Raju to a double countout at the Impact television tapings in Las Vegas. At Bound for Glory on October 20, Sabu competed in the Call Your Shot Gauntlet match, which was won by Eddie Edwards.

On the March 24, 2020 episode of Impact, Sabu and Rhino defeated Ohio Versus Everything (Dave Crist and Madman Fulton) in Sabu's final match in TNA.

=== Final appearances (2023–2025) ===
On May 24, 2023, Sabu made his debut for All Elite Wrestling (AEW) on Dynamite, where he was revealed to be the special guest enforcer for the unsanctioned match between Adam Cole and Chris Jericho at Double or Nothing.

In 2024, Brunk drew criticism from promoters after failing to appear for his own induction into the Independent Wrestling Hall of Fame in Philadelphia during WrestleMania 40 weekend. Johnson wrote that Brunk simply "didn't want to go upstairs" to the induction venue, calling the no-show "insane" given that the independent wrestling scene of the 1990s would not exist in its later form without him. GCW subsequently built the incident into the storyline for Brunk's retirement match against Joey Janela at Spring Break 9, with Janela referencing the no-show in promotional segments ahead of the bout.

On April 18, 2025, Sabu won his retirement match, a No Rope Barbed Wire match against Joey Janela at Game Changer Wrestling (GCW)'s Joey Janela's Spring Break 9, held during WrestleMania 41 weekend in Las Vegas, three weeks before his death. Pollock reported that Brunk had reportedly been unable to walk earlier on the day of the show and suffered a heavy fall to the floor during the bout, but completed the match as planned; Janela subsequently set aside his in-ring character to praise the retiring wrestler, a moment later described by commentators as a rare feel-good send-off in professional wrestling. The match and GCW would later come under scrutiny after an interview with Janela was published in which he intimated that Sabu was unfit to wrestle the match until he was provided a dose of the opiate substitute kratom in response to pain to ensure his attendance, and that he still appeared intoxicated backstage when he arrived at the show.

== Professional wrestling style and persona ==
Sabu was nicknamed "The Homicidal, Suicidal, Genocidal, Death-Defying Maniac" because of his high-flying and hardcore wrestling style.

For most of his career, Sabu did not speak on camera, letting his in-ring actions convey his character rather than promos or interviews; WWE's official biography summarized this directly, stating "Sabu never spoke." Oliver Lee Bateman of The Ringer and John Pollock both linked this silence to the influence of Farhat, who likewise cultivated a mute, mysterious ring persona throughout his own career. In his memoir, Brunk wrote that Farhat never referred to professional wrestling as "a work" in front of him, a discretion Brunk credited with shaping his own reluctance, for much of his career, to discuss the business openly. Mike Johnson offered a more personal explanation for the same reticence, writing that Brunk co-wrote his memoir with Casanova specifically so that he would not have to talk about himself directly, and that Brunk told him he was "painfully shy"; Johnson suggested that hiding within his in-ring persona, rather than granting interviews or public appearances, suited that shyness as much as it served the character.

Some of his signature moves used a steel chair, such as the Air Sabu (a heel kick to a cornered opponent, with the assistance of a steel chair), the Arabian Facebuster (jumping, diving or a somersault leg drop, driving a steel chair into the face of the opponent) and the Arabian Skullcrusher (jumping, diving or a somersault leg drop, driving a steel chair into the back of the opponent's head, usually through a table).

Sabu was also credited with popularizing the use of tables as offensive weapons in North American wrestling, and a February 1997 tag team match pitting Sabu and Rob Van Dam against The Eliminators was cited by WWE as a direct precursor to the modern Tables, Ladders and Chairs match concept. In a later interview with David Bixenspan for Fighting Spirit Magazine, Brunk explained that he deliberately wrestled a slower, more conventional style early in his matches so that his more spectacular "Sabu style" offense would draw a bigger reaction later on, dismissing critics who felt his matches lacked psychology by arguing that fans understood his approach even if commentators did not.

Brunk's memoir detailed the physical toll of his style and the painkiller use that accompanied it. He wrote that his reliance on prescription opioids began after Chris Benoit, who had accidentally broken his neck in their November 1994 match, gave him pills to manage the resulting pain, and escalated further after he broke his jaw during a 1996 tag match against Tommy Dreamer and The Sandman in Boston, when a broken table leg struck him under the chin during a moonsault. Brunk wrote that Rob Van Dam helped tape his jaw shut at ringside using a strip of toilet paper to keep his hair free of the tape, and that he continued wrestling with the injury for some time before having it surgically reset, at which point an X-ray reportedly revealed bullet fragments from the 1983 shooting still lodged near his jaw. Following a locker-room recommendation from fellow wrestler Axl Rotten to increase his Vicodin dosage after the injury, Brunk wrote that his painkiller use became habitual, summarizing his approach in the book with the phrase, "self-medicate at all costs." He estimated in the memoir that he had broken thirty to forty bones over the course of his career. Mike Johnson wrote more broadly that Brunk's work ethic never allowed for injury time off, recalling matches in which Brunk wrestled through a torn bicep, broken finger bones, a broken neck, and shattered teeth, and that this refusal to slow down eventually became as much a liability as it had once been an asset.

Despite his association with high-risk maneuvers, Brunk later expressed skepticism toward what he viewed as excessive spectacle in modern professional wrestling. In a 2024 interview with Covalent TV, he contrasted his own use of props, which he said was built around a narrative setup and tease, with contemporary stunt-driven wrestling, saying of wrestlers who broke tables purely for shock value, "When they break a table, they're just doing it for the crash." He also rejected being characterized as a stuntman or actor, telling the same outlet that his high-risk maneuvers were not comparable to scripted stunt work.

== In media ==
He appeared in the video game ECW Hardcore Revolution, Legends of Wrestling, Legends of Wrestling II, Backyard Wrestling: Don't Try This At Home, Showdown: Legends of Wrestling, and WWE SmackDown vs. Raw 2008. Sabu's likeness also appears, albeit unofficially, in several games within the Fire Pro Wrestling franchise including Fire Pro Wrestling, Fire Pro Wrestling 2, and Fire Pro Wrestling Returns.

On September 8, 2016, Brunk guest starred on an episode of the Viceland television program, Traveling the Stars: Action Bronson and Friends Watch 'Ancient Aliens': Alien Devastation with his former tag team partner Rob Van Dam and manager The Super Genie (Melissa Coates).

In January 2019, it was announced that Brunk would release a memoir, Scars, Silence, & Superglue, co-written with Kenny Casanova, detailing his career and injuries. The book, published later that year, included forewords from Rob Van Dam and Taz and was framed by Brunk as a frank account of his career, including his history of prescription and recreational drug use.

== Personal life and death ==
Brunk married a Japanese woman named Hitomi on June 22, 1997, in Michigan, and had a separate Japanese ceremony in Tokyo later that year. Sources disagree on the date of the Japanese ceremony: Brunk's memoir instead placed it in December 1998, coinciding with an FMW tour of Japan during which Farhat held his in-ring retirement ceremony. The couple separated more than a decade before Brunk's death; however, according to the Wrestling Observer Newsletter, they never formally divorced, and Hitomi Brunk, who continued to live in Japan, had not authorized the release of information related to his death as of late May 2025. Brunk's own memoir, published in 2019, nonetheless referred to Hitomi as his "ex-wife" and described the marriage itself as a mistake, without elaborating further.

Brunk began dating Melissa Coates. From late 2014 until her death on June 23, 2021, she also worked as his wrestling valet. Pollock, writing shortly after Brunk's death, suggested that Coates's death must have weighed heavily on Brunk, who was known to keep much of his personal life private. In his own memoir, published two years before her death, Brunk credited Coates, who by then managed his bookings and merchandise, with "keeping me sane like nobody else can."

In 2016, Brunk drew public criticism after using a racial slur in a social media post and making further disparaging comments about race when questioned about it by the wrestling outlet Pro Wrestling Sheet. In his memoir, Brunk described his provocative social media persona in broader terms as a deliberate heel tactic intended to generate attention and bookings, writing that "controversy creates cash" and acknowledging that not everything he posted online reflected his genuine views. He did not directly revisit the 2016 controversy in the book.

In July 2016, Brunk was named part of a class action lawsuit filed against WWE which alleged that wrestlers incurred "long term neurological injuries" and that the company "routinely failed to care" for them and "fraudulently misrepresented and concealed" the nature and extent of those injuries. The suit was litigated by attorney Konstantine Kyros, who has been involved in a number of other lawsuits against WWE. The lawsuit was dismissed by US District Judge Vanessa Lynne Bryant in September 2018.

=== Death ===
Brunk's cause of death was not publicly disclosed. According to the Wrestling Observer Newsletter, because he and his estranged wife had never formally divorced and she had not authorized release of his medical information from Japan, no official cause of death was made available. Meltzer reported that Brunk was believed to have died suddenly at around 6:30 a.m. in his apartment in Las Vegas. Brunk died on May 11, 2025, three weeks after competing in what was billed as his retirement match against Joey Janela; Meltzer noted that the April 18 show drew the largest crowd of any non-WWE event held in Las Vegas that WrestleMania week. Despite being listed as aged 60 at the time of his death by most outlets, including WWE, court documents indicate he was actually 61.

Both WWE and All Elite Wrestling confirmed Brunk's death in statements released on May 11, 2025. AEW's statement praised Sabu's contributions to the sport, citing his barbed-wire matches and high-risk maneuvers. GCW owner Brett Lauderdale, who had promoted Sabu's retirement match weeks earlier, told ESPN, "It was an honor and a pleasure to work with Sabu one last time." The New York Times reported that Brunk's family could not be immediately reached for comment following his death, and that no cause had been announced by the company. GCW, which hosted Sabu's final match three weeks prior to his death, denied any involvement in his death.

== Legacy ==
Sabu was credited as a revolutionary due to his work in ECW.

In his obituary for the Wrestling Observer Newsletter, Dave Meltzer wrote that opinions of Sabu's in-ring ability varied sharply throughout his career: some considered him the best American wrestler of his era for his willingness to absorb punishment and his acrobatic style, while others viewed him as overrated, arguing his technical smoothness and match psychology were lacking even as his highlight-reel moments stood out from anything else being done at the time. Meltzer noted that Sabu nearly won the Wrestling Observer's Wrestler of the Year award in 1994, finishing a close second to Toshiaki Kawada in a vote many expected him to win. According to Meltzer, Terry Funk argued that Sabu deserved consideration for the WWE Hall of Fame given how much he sacrificed for the business relative to what he received in return. Meltzer further credited Sabu as being largely responsible, in-ring, for the "ECW" chants that persisted at independent shows for decades after the promotion's 2001 closure, as well as the "We Want Tables" chants that remain common across North American promotions.

John Pollock of Post Wrestling wrote that ECW's own legacy was, in turn, substantially contingent on Sabu, particularly in 1994, when the promotion needed a performer capable of embodying its identity as a hardcore alternative to the WWF and WCW. Pollock also noted that Sabu had been a close training and business partner of Rob Van Dam since the two met in 1989, and that Van Dam ultimately surpassed Sabu as ECW's biggest star.

Mike Johnson of PWInsider made a similar argument in more direct terms, writing that "Sabu WAS ECW," and that an October 1993 television taping in which Sabu wrestled Tazmaniac amounted to "a proof of concept" for everything the promotion aspired to be. Johnson also described Sabu as an underground star in the years before the internet, writing that fans traded bootleg tapes of his matches in a manner he compared to how mixed martial arts fans later discovered Kimbo Slice, and that this word-of-mouth reputation, rather than television exposure, first established Sabu's reputation nationally. He further credited Sabu with quietly supporting younger and less established wrestlers financially over the course of his career, recalling instances in which Sabu paid for undercard performers' meals out of his own ECW wages and drove fellow wrestlers between shows in his Winnebago rather than have them fly. Johnson suggested that the same rigid, uncompromising principles about how the wrestling business "should" work, instilled in Sabu by Farhat, accounted for both this generosity and his history of clashes with promoters and no-shows.

Following his death, WWE wrestler Sami Zayn described Sabu as "one of a kind, absolute legend, and a true game changer for professional wrestling." Oliver Lee Bateman of The Ringer wrote that later daredevil and hardcore performers, including Jeff Hardy, Darby Allin and Mance Warner, owed a debt to Sabu's innovations of the 1990s.

In his own memoir, published six years before his death, Brunk wrote that he had few regrets about his career, acknowledging that he might have advanced further by being more diplomatic with promoters and bookers, but suggesting that doing so would have compromised the authenticity of his character. Mike Johnson offered a similar assessment from an outside perspective, writing that Sabu "lived his life the way he wanted to do, good and bad, regrets and results alike," and that this same uncompromising quality was simultaneously his greatest attribute and his greatest detriment.

== Championships and accomplishments ==
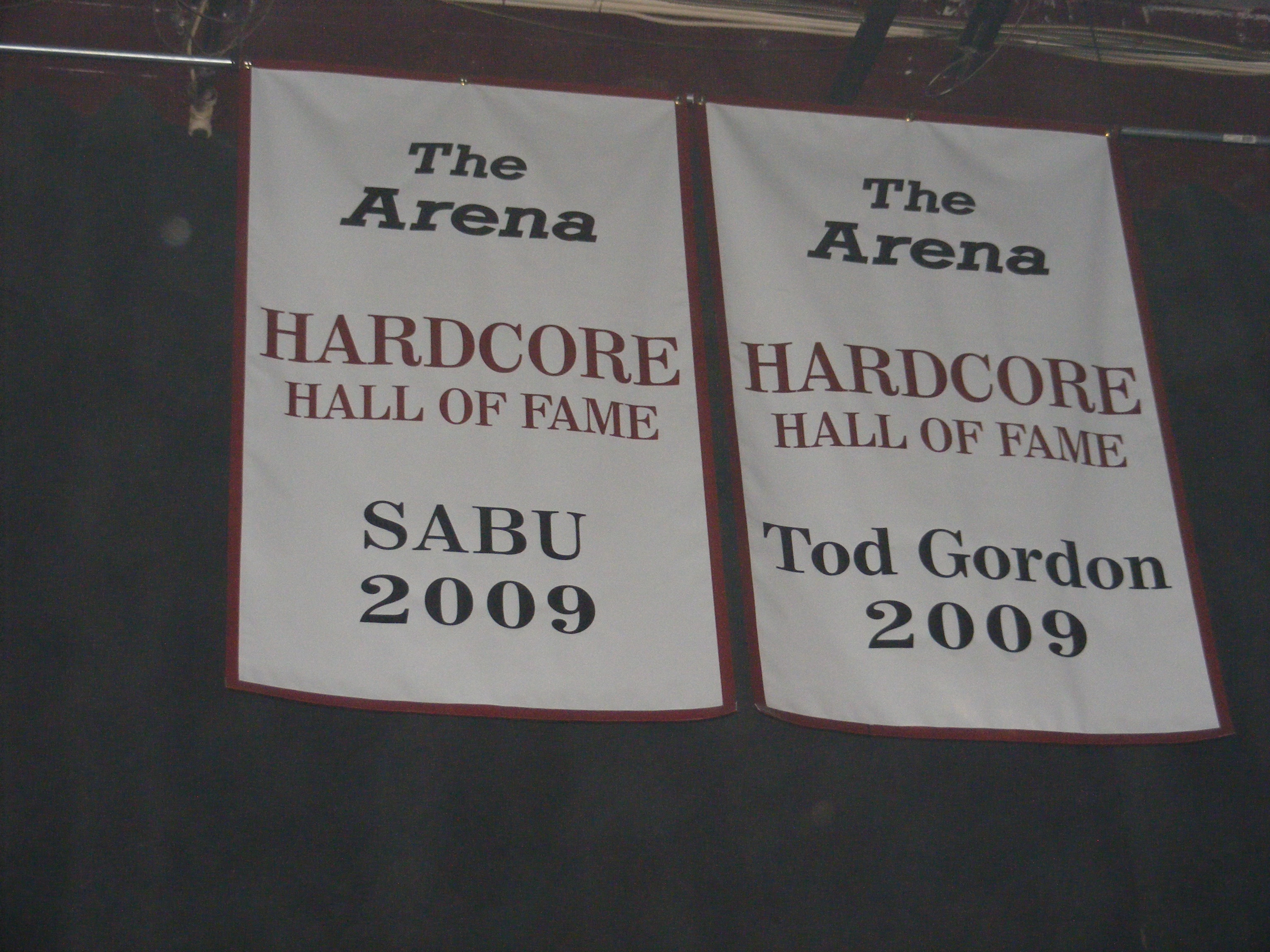
Sabu's Hardcore Hall of Fame banner in the former ECW Arena

- Billtown Championship Wrestling
  - BCW Heavyweight Championship (1 time, inaugural)
  - BCW Heavyweight Title Tournament (2016)
- Border City Wrestling
  - BCW Can-Am Heavyweight Championship (1 time)
- Eastern Championship Wrestling/Extreme Championship Wrestling
  - ECW World Heavyweight Championship (2 times) (Note: Sabu's first reign occurred while the promotion was an NWA affiliate named Eastern Championship Wrestling, and was prior to the promotion becoming Extreme Championship Wrestling and the title being declared a world title by ECW. Sabu held the title again after these events.)
  - FTW Heavyweight Championship (1 time) (Note: Title was not officially sanctioned by ECW.)
  - ECW World Television Championship (1 time)
  - ECW World Tag Team Championship (3 times) – with Taz (1) and Rob Van Dam (2)
  - King of the Hill (1996)
  - Second ECW Triple Crown Champion
- European Wrestling Association
  - EWA European Junior Heavyweight Championship (2 times)
- Frontier Martial-Arts Wrestling
  - WWA Martial-Arts Tag Team Championship (1 time) – with Horace Boulder
- Hardcore Hall of Fame
  - Class of 2009
- Indie Wrestling Hall of Fame
  - Class of 2024
- International Wrestling Cartel
  - IWC Tag Team Championship (1 time) – with Eric Xtasy and JT Rodgers
- Insane Wrestling Federation
  - IWF Heavyweight Championship (2 times)
- Juggalo Championship Wrestling
  - JCW Heavyweight Championship (1 time)
- Main Event Championship Wrestling
  - MECW APW Hardcore Championship (1 time)
- NWA Florida
  - NWA World Heavyweight Championship (1 time)
  - NWA Independent World Championship (1 time)
- National Wrestling Conference
  - NWC Heavyweight Championship (2 time, final)
- New Japan Pro-Wrestling
  - IWGP Junior Heavyweight Championship (1 time)
  - UWA World Junior Light Heavyweight Championship (1 time)
- Pro Wrestling All-Stars Of Detroit
  - PWASD Cruiser Core Championship (1 time)
- Pro Wrestling Holland
  - Pro Wrestling Holland Championship (1 time)
- Pro Wrestling Illustrated
  - Ranked No. 5 of the top 500 singles wrestlers in the PWI 500 in 1995
  - Ranked No. 86 of the top 500 singles wrestlers of the PWI Years in 2003
- Professional Championship Wrestling
  - PCW Television Championship (1 time)
- New Evolution Wrestling
  - Newfoundland Heritage Championship (1 time)
- Pro-Pain Pro Wrestling
  - 3PW World Heavyweight Championship (1 time)
- Stampede Wrestling
  - Stampede Pacific Heavyweight Championship (1 time)
- Total Nonstop Action Wrestling
  - TNA Year End Award (1 time)
    - Match of the Year (2005) vs. Abyss, Barbed Wire Massacre on December 11
- UPW Pro Wrestling
  - UPW American Championship (2 times)
- USA Pro Wrestling
  - USA Pro Heavyweight Championship (2 times)
- Wawan Wrestling Championship
  - WWC Hardcore Championship (1 time)
- Wrestling Alliance Revolution
  - WAR World Extreme Championship (2 times)
- World Wrestling Council
  - WWC Hardcore Championship (2 times)
  - WWC Universal Heavyweight Championship (1 time)
  - Bruiser Brody Memorial Cup (2005)
- World Wrestling League
  - WWL Extreme Championship (1 time)
- Wrestling Observer Newsletter
  - Readers' Favorite Wrestler (1994)
  - Wrestling Observer Newsletter Hall of Fame (2025)
- Xtreme Intense Championship Wrestling
  - XICW Xtreme Championship (1 time)
- Xtreme Latin American Wrestling
  - X-LAW International Championship (1 time)
- Xtreme Pro Wrestling
  - XPW World Heavyweight Championship (1 time)
