= Bruiser Brody Memorial Cup =

Annual World Wrestling Council event

- Promotion: World Wrestling Council
- Date: 2005-2006
- City: Guayanilla, Bayamón, and Hormigueros, Puerto Rico (July 15–17, 2005); Ponce and Bayamón, Puerto Rico (July 23–24, 2006)
- Venue: Lenin Lopez Coliseum, the Juan Ramón Loubriel Stadium and the Wilfredo Toro Coliseum (July 15–17, 2005); Frankie Colon Sports Complex Arena and the Pepín Cestero Arena (July 23–24, 2006)

The Bruiser Brody Memorial Cup was an annual professional wrestling memorial event produced by the World Wrestling Council (WWC) promotion, which was held from 2005 to 2006. The show was held in honor of Bruiser Brody who had been stabbed to death by Invader I backstage at a WWC show in Bayamón on July 16, 1988. It was the second memorial event held for Brody in Puerto Rico since the IWA Puerto Rico's Bruiser Brody Memorial Show in 2000, and the first time a Brody memorial show was held by the WWC.

The first Bruiser Brody Memorial Cup consisted of a three-day tour from July 15 to July 17, 2005, with shows at the Lenin Lopez Coliseum in Guayanilla, the Juan Ramón Loubriel Stadium in Bayamón, and the Wilfredo Toro Coliseum in Hormigueros, Puerto Rico. Nine professional wrestling matches were featured on the event's card for first two nights and seven on the final night. The main attraction was a two-ring, thirty-man "Bunkhouse Stampede" battle royal dedicated to Brody which was won by Sabu. Other featured matches included The Sandman defeating Sabu in a "hardcore" match and Full Impact Pro's The Market Crashers (Dow Jones and NASDAQ) beating Black Thunder and Chris Joel. Chris Joel defended the WWC Puerto Rican Championship against Eric Alexander, WWC World Tag Team Champions Joe Bravo and Vengador Boricua defeated The Market Crashers (Dow Jones and NASDAQ), and Eddie Colón won the WWC Universal Championship from Diamante in a Tables, Ladders, and Chairs match.

The Bruiser Brody Memorial Cup tour returned for a second year being held from June 23 to June 24, 2006, at the Frankie Colon Sports Complex Arena in Ponce and at the Pepín Cestero Arena in Bayamón, Puerto Rico. Eight professional wrestling matches were featured on both nights of the event's card, with five including championships. The main event for the first show was a tag team match which saw Eddie Colón and Shane defeating Black Pain and Orlando Jordan via disqualification. The second night's main event was the "Bruiser Brody Cup" battle royal which was won by Abbad after eliminating Abdullah the Butcher; Abbad had lost to Abdullah the Butcher in a Bloodfest match on the undercard. Other featured matches included WWC Junior Heavyweight Champion Brent Dail defeating Superstar Romeo, Black Rose defeated Lady Demonique for the WWC Women's Championship (with Stacey Colón as the special guest referee), Huracán Castillo and Chicky Starr defeating WWC World Tag Team Champions Tim Arson and Rico Suave by disqualification, and Alex Montalvo beating WWC Puerto Rico Heavyweight Champion El Bronco to win the title. A match for the then vacant WWC Universal Heavyweight Championship between Eddie Colón defeated Orlando Jordan, and refereed by Carlos Colón, ended in a no-contest when Colón was awarded the match by disqualification.

Although this marked the last Brody memorial tour, the promotion held one last "Bruiser Brody Cup" battle royal at the WWC 34th Anniversary Show in 2007 in which Fidel Sierra and Ricky Santana were declared the co-winners.

While these shows were not widely promoted outside Puerto Rico, the promotion received some criticism from the internet wrestling community. Brody biographer Emerson Murray, who interviewed WWC owner Carlos Colón while doing research for "Bruiser Brody" (2007), claimed that Colón "was tight-lipped but friendly" and, although having "nothing but good things to say about Brody", avoided talking about Brody's murder while promoting the then upcoming memorial show. The New Zealand Pro Wrestling Informer (NZPWI) website referred to the WWC as "the bastion of no-taste promoting" for holding one of the shows in the same stadium where Brody was killed as well as featuring Invader I on the card. In his review of the event, however, Armando Rodriguez of 411mania.com wrote that "the weeks surrounding the Bruiser Brody Memorial Cup where really exciting and full of good matches" and that the July 16th show of the 2005 Bruiser Brody Memorial Tour was "one of the best shows of the year". A few U.S. wrestlers, such as The Sheik and The Market Crashers (Dow Jones and NASDAQ), have considered their participation in the shows one of the highlights in their career.

== Show results ==
=== First Annual Bruiser Brody Memorial Cup Tour (2005) ===
==== Bruiser Brody Memorial Cup Tour (Day 1) ====
July 15, 2005 in Guayanilla, Puerto Rico (Lenin Lopez Coliseum)

No.	Results	Stipulations	Times
1	Brent Dail defeated El Bakano	Singles match	08:42
2	Tim Arson defeated Demolition X	Singles match	07:18
3	The Market Crashers (Dow Jones and NASDAQ) defeated Mike Dagger and Tahitian Warrior	Tag Team match	—
4	Angel Rodriguez defeated Eli Rodriguez	Singles match	—
5	Carlos Colón and Eddie Colón defeated Rico Suave and Super Medico I via disqualification	Tag Team match	—
6	Eric Alexander defeated Joe Bravo	Singles match	11:05
7	Bryan defeated Jungle Jim Steele	Singles match	12:10
8	El Bronco defeated Abdullah The Butcher via disqualification.	Lumberjack match	10:20
9	The Sandman defeated Sabu	Hardcore match	11:28

==== Bruiser Brody Memorial Cup Tour (Day 2) ====
July 16, 2005 in Bayamon, Puerto Rico (Juan Ramón Loubriel Stadium)

No.	Results	Stipulations
1	Chris Joel (c) defeated Eric Alexander	Singles match for the WWC Puerto Rican Championship
2	La Bella Carmen defeated Black Rose	Ladies Hardcore match
3	Chicky Starr defeated Tim Arson via disqualification	Singles match
4	Joe Bravo and Vengador Boricua (c) defeated The Market Crashers (Dow Jones and NASDAQ)	Tag Team match for the WWC World Tag Team Championship
5	Super Medico I defeated Carlos Colón	Legends match
6	Eddie Colón defeated Diamante (c)	Tables, Ladders, and Chairs match for the WWC Universal Championship
7	Bryan defeated Jungle Jim Steele and The Sandman	Three-Way Dance
8	El Bronco and Sabu defeated Abdullah The Butcher and Rico Suave via disqualification	Tag Team match
9	Sabu defeated 30 other participants to win the "Bruiser Brody Memorial Cup".	Thirty-man "Bunkhouse Stampede" battle royal
(c) / – the champion(s) heading into the match

==== Bruiser Brody Memorial Cup Tour (Day 3) ====
July 17, 2005 in Hormigueros, Puerto Rico (Wilfredo Toro Coliseum)

No.	Results	Stipulations
1	Brent Dail defeated Demolition X	Singles match
2	Rikochett defeated Doble Ninja Ninja and La Pulga	Three-Way Dance
3	Tim Arson defeated an unknown wrestler	Singles match
4	Jungle Jim Steele vs. Tahitian Warrior ended in a double-countout	Singles match
5	Carlos Colón and Eddie Colón defeated Rico Suave and Super Medico I by disqualification	Tag Team match
6	El Bronco defeated The Sandman	Hardcore match
7	The Market Crashers (Dow Jones and NASDAQ) defeated Black Thunder and Chris Joel	Tag Team match

=== Second Annual Bruiser Brody Memorial Cup Tour (2006) ===
==== Bruiser Brody Memorial Cup Tour (Day 1) ====
June 23, 2006 in Ponce, Puerto Rico (Frankie Colon Sports Complex Arena)

No.	Results	Stipulations	Times
1	D'Jour (Dave and David D'Jour) defeated Hunter and Rage	Tag Team match	10:19
2	Demoniqe and Doble Ninja Ninja defeated Black Rose and Rikochet	Mixed Tag Team match	08:33
3	Superstar Romeo vs. Crazy Rudy ended in a no-contest	Singles match	10:20
4	Huracán Castillo defeated Rico Suave	Singles match	12:23
5	Bronco I defeated Tim Arson	Singles match	14:42
6	Fire Blaze defeated Brent Dail	Singles match	09:18
7	Abbad defeated Jason X	Singles match	12:34
8	Eddie Colón and Shane defeated Black Pain and Orlando Jordan via disqualification	Tag Team match	14:21

==== Bruiser Brody Memorial Cup Tour (Day 2) ====
June 24, 2006 in Bayamón, Puerto Rico (Pepín Cestero Arena)

No.	Results	Stipulations
1	Brent Dail (c) defeated Superstar Romeo	Singles match for the WWC Junior Heavyweight Championship
2	Black Rose defeated Lady Demonique (c)	Singles match for the WWC Women's Championship with special guest referee Stacey Colón
3	Huracán Castillo and Chicky Starr defeated Tim Arson and Rico Suave (c) by disqualification.	Tag Team match for the WWC World Tag Team Championship
4	Alex Montalvo defeated El Bronco (c)	Singles match for the WWC Puerto Rico Heavyweight Championship
5	Eddie Colón defeated Orlando Jordan	Singles match
6	Shane defeated Black Pain by disqualification.	Singles match for the vacant WWC Universal Heavyweight Championship with special guest referee Carlos Colón.
7	Abdullah the Butcher defeated Abbad	Bloodfest match
8	Abbad defeated 29 other participants by last eliminating Abdullah the Butcher. (Note: A partial list of other participants includes: Chicky Starr, Huracán Castillo, Rico Suave, Tim Arson, Eddie Colón, Brent Dail, Orlando Jordan, Superstar Romeo, Black Pain, Shane, Bronco #1, Joe Bravo, Alex Montalvo, Chris Joel, Crazy Rudy.)	Bruiser Brody Cup thirty-man battle royal
(c) / – the champion(s) heading into the match

== See also ==
- Professional wrestling in Puerto Rico
