= Karate at the 2002 Central American and Caribbean Games =

Karate competition

- Location: (El Salvador) San Salvador

The Karate competition at the 2002 Central American and Caribbean Games was held in San Salvador, El Salvador.

== Medal summary ==
=== Men's events ===
Event	Gold	Silver	Bronze
Under 60 kg	Alberto Zabala (DOM)	Miguel Yepez (VEN)	Nelson Sunun (GUA); Miguel Granado (ESA)
Under 65 kg	Javier Jáuregui Larios (MEX)	Alberto Barillas (ESA)	Miguel Artiles (DOM); Jean Carlos Peña (VEN)
Under 70 kg	Emilio Oviedo (MEX)	Dionicio Gustavo (DOM)	Jaime Avalos (ESA); Ulvic Jamanika (AHO)
Under 75 kg	Rubel Salomón (DOM)	Israel Piñate (VEN)	Luis Navarro (COL); Alonso Murayama (MEX)
Over 80 kg	Sterling Félix (DOM)	Omar Correa (PUR)	Timothy Coulson (CAY); William Serrano (ESA)
Open	José Ignacio Pérez (VEN)	Omar Correa (PUR)	Israel Medina (MEX); Jean Carlos Peña (VEN)
Kata	Antonio Díaz (VEN)	Juan Salmerón (ESA)	Juan Carlos Andrade (MEX); Ariel Pérez (DOM)
Team Kata	Mexico (Alonso Murayama, Eduardo Gómez, Emilio Oviedo)	El Salvador (Williams Serrano, Ricardo Ayala, Jaime Avalos)	Nicaragua (Hernan Manzanares, Marlon Leyton, Wilfredo Rodríguez) Guatemala (Nelson Sunun, Manuel Gudiel, Juan Carlos Valdes)
Team Kumite	Mexico (Eduardo Gómez, Alonso Murayama, Antonio Puente, Armando Medina, Emilio Oviedo)	Venezuela (Nguyen Rodriguez, Miguel Yepez, José Ignacio Pérez, Jean Carlos Peña, Israel Peñate)	El Salvador Rene Aguilar, Jaime Avalos, Ricardo Ayala, Williams Serrano, Juan Salmerón) Dominican Republic (José Confidente, Alberto Zabala, Dionicio Gustavo, Miguel Artiles, Rubel Salomón, Sterling Félix, Ariel Pérez)

=== Women's events ===
Event	Gold	Silver	Bronze
Under 53 kg	Lisbeth Cruz (VEN)	Julissa Toribio (DOM)	Cheili González (GUA); Marta Embriz (MEX)
Under 60 kg	Ana Montilla (DOM)	Claudia Duran (ESA)	Yadira Lira (MEX); Luisa Bojorquez (AHO)
Over 60 kg	Dilcimes Brito (VEN)	Katty Acevedo (DOM)	Leticia Montoya (MEX); Patricia Ferguson (BAH)
Open	Heidy Rodríguez (DOM)	Yadira Lira (MEX)	Dilcimes Brito (VEN); Ana Montilla (DOM)
Kata	Ana Martínez (VEN)	Claudia Fuentes (ESA)	Erica Lozano (MEX); Rosa María Canek (GUA)
Team Kata	El Salvador (Lidia Leiva, Flor Molina, Claudia Fuentes)	Mexico (Yadira Lira, Marta Embriz, Leticia Montoya)	Honduras (Ana López, Alicia Chirinos, Luisa Kattan) Nicaragua (Karla Guadamuz, Claudia López, Jacqueline Sánchez)
Team Kumite	Mexico (Marta Embriz, Yadira Lira, Leticia Montoya)	Venezuela (Dilcimes Brito, Lisbeth Castro, Cristina Reyes)	El Salvador (Claudia Fuentes, Lidia Leiva, Flor Molina) Dominican Republic (Katty Acevedo, Ana Montilla, Julissa Toribio)
