= WWL Extreme Championship =

2014 professional wrestling championship

Details
- Promotion: World Wrestling League
- Date established: October 18, 2014
Statistics
- First champion: Sabu
- Most reigns: All Champions (1 reign)
- Longest reign: Monster Pain (295 days)
- Shortest reign: Sabu (80 days)
- Oldest champion: Sabu (49 years)
- Youngest champion: Monster Pain (32-33 years)
- Heaviest champion: Monster Pain (389 lb (176 kg))
- Lightest champion: Sabu (220 lb (100 kg))

The WWL Extreme Championship (Campeonato Extremo de la WWL in Spanish) is a professional wrestling championship promoted by the World Wrestling League (WWL) promotion in Puerto Rico.

The championship was generally contested in professional wrestling matches, in which participants execute scripted finishes rather than contend in direct competition under extreme rules, it is meaning that everything is permitted.

== Title history ==
#	Wrestlers	Reign	Date	Days held	Location	Event	Notes	Ref
1	Sabu	1	October 18, 2014	80	Bayamón, Puerto Rico	Insurrection	Defeated Balls Mahoney to become first champion.	
2	Monster Pain	1	January 6, 2015	295	San Juan, Puerto Rico	Guerra de Reyes		
–	Vacant	–	October 28, 2015	–			When Pain left the promotion.	
