= Deysy Montes de Oca =

Dominican Republic taekwondo practitioner

Personal information
- Born: 13 March 1990 (age 36) Santiago de los Caballeros, Dominican Republic

Sport
- Sport: Taekwondo
Medal record
Representing the Dominican Republic
Central American and Caribbean Games
Gold medal – first place	2010 Mayaguez	Over 73kg

Deysy María Montes de Oca Silverio (born March 13, 1990) is a Dominican taekwondo practitioner.

== Career ==
At the 2008 Pan-American Championship held in Caguas, Puerto Rico, Montes de Oca defeated the Colombian Lorena Díaz to win the continental championship golden medal.

Montes de Oca won the golden medal in the 2010 Central American and Caribbean Games at the Over 73 kg category.

Montes de Oca was awarded "2010 Dominican Republic Taekwondo Female Athlete of Year" after her hard work during that year. She was also awarded in her native province as "Female Athlete of the year" in the same year.
