= Taekwondo at the 2010 Central American and Caribbean Games =

Taekwondo competition

- Venue: Wilfredo Toro Field
- Location: Mayagüez
- Dates: 27–29 July

The taekwondo competition at the 2010 Central American and Caribbean Games was held in Mayagüez, Puerto Rico.

The tournament was scheduled to be held from 27 to 29 July at the Wilfredo Toro Field at Porta del Sol.

== Medal summary ==
=== Men's events ===
Event	Gold	Silver	Bronze
Under 54 kg	Harold Avella (COL)	Edgar Sanchez (MEX)	Jhonnatan Mejia (GUA); Heiner Oviedo (CRC)
Under 58 kg	Yulis Gabriel Mercedes (DOM)	Damian Villa (MEX)	Mario Leal (VEN); Gerardo Torres (PUR)
Under 63 kg	Jairo Rijo (DOM)	Federico Rosal (GUA)	Jocelin Joseph (HAI); Hernan Villafañe (VEN)
Under 68 kg	Idulio Islas (MEX)	Jhohanny Jean (DOM)	Dorian Alexander (TRI); Danny Miranda (VEN)
Under 74 kg	Juan Sanchez (PUR)	Uriel Adriano (MEX)	Javier Medina (VEN); Yacomo García (DOM)
Under 80 kg	Carlos Vasquez (VEN)	Stuart Cilbert (ARU)	Jose Ramirez (MEX); Jose Silverio (DOM)
Under 87 kg	Javier Richard (DOM)	Adrian Spellen (GUY)	Kenneth Edwards (JAM); Carlos Rivas (VEN)
Over 87 kg	Salvador Perez (MEX)	Kristopher Moitland (CRC)	Jimmy Chery (HAI); Adrian Puello (PUR)

=== Women's events ===
Event	Gold	Silver	Bronze
Under 46 kg	Itzel Manjarrez (MEX)	Jenifer Ordoñez (GUA)	Virginia Dellan (VEN); Santiago Zoraida (PUR)
Under 49 kg	Elizabeth Zamora (GUA)	Mónica Carolina (COL)	Aischal van der Linde (ARU); Myrllam Vargas (PUR)
Under 53 kg	Miladys Mariño (VEN)	Disnansi Polanco (DOM)	Euda Carias (GUA); Sara Ramos (PUR)
Under 57 kg	Doris Patiño (COL)	Rosa Reyna (MEX)	Aurora Millan (VEN); Laura Vasquez (ESA)
Under 62 kg	Adanys Cordero (VEN)	Carolina Acosta (MEX)	Carla Cotto (PUR); Dinanyiris Furcal (DOM)
Under 67 kg	Asunción Ocasio (PUR)	Katherine Rodríguez (DOM)	Lida Hernández (COL); Hortencia Perez (MEX)
Under 73 kg	María Espinoza (MEX)	Sandra Venegas (COL)	Teresa Guevara (VEN); Candy Lorenzo (DOM)
Over 73 kg	Deysy Montes de Oca (DOM)	Guadalupe Ruiz (MEX)	Katherine Alvarado (CRC); Amelia Corbie (TRI)
