= Karate at the 2010 Central American and Caribbean Games =

Karate competition

- Venue: Wilfredo Toro Coliseum
- Location: (Puerto Rico) Mayagüez
- Dates: 23-25 July

The Karate competition at the 2010 Central American and Caribbean Games was held in Mayagüez, Puerto Rico.

The tournament was scheduled to be held from 23–25 July at the Wilfredo Toro Field in Porta del Sol.

== Medal summary ==
=== Men's events ===
| Event | Gold | Silver | Bronze |
|---|---|---|---|
| Under 60kg | David Pérez (ESA) | Andrés Rendón (COL) | Robin Blanco (VEN); Norberto Sosa (DOM) |
| Under 67kg | Jean Carlos Peña (VEN) | Deivis Ferreras (DOM) | José Ramírez (COL); Jesús Rodríguez (PUR) |
| Under 75kg | Dionicio Gustavo (DOM) | Aarón Pérez (ESA) | Andrés Pirela (VEN); Harsamrat Virde (MEX) |
| Under 84kg | Homero Morales (MEX) | José Paz (ESA) | Jorge Pérez (DOM); José Rodríguez (PAN) |
| Over 84kg | Ángel Aponte (VEN) | Kwame Kinsale (TRI) | Cesar Duarte (CRC); Nelson González (PUR) |
| Kata | Antonio Díaz (VEN) | Juan Andrade (MEX) | Carlos Santos (PAN); Carlos Segura (DOM) |
| Team Kata | Mexico (Juan Carlos Andrade, Guillermo Domínguez, Abraham Briseño) | Guatemala (Alejandro Abdala, Guido Abdala, Pedro Marroquín) | Puerto Rico (Ricardo Cervoni, Víctor Colón, Marcos Ramírez) Dominican Republic (Carlos Segura, Francisco Cuevas, Ariel Pérez) |
| Team Kumite | Venezuela (Robin Blanco, Andrés Pirela, César Herrera, Ángel Aponte, Jean Carlos Peña) | Mexico (Ricardo Campillo, Jeffrey De Antuaño, Homero Morales, Harsamrat Virde, Carlos Ibarra) | Guatemala (Nery Coy, Elias Torres, Bayron Vasquez, Pedro Marroquín) Dominican Republic (Rubel Salomon, Deivis Ferreras, Dionicio Gustavo, Jorge Pérez, Norberto Sosa, Juan Valdez) |

=== Women's events ===
| Event | Gold | Silver | Bronze |
|---|---|---|---|
| Under 50kg | Cheili Gonzalez (GUA) | Dougmay Camacaro (VEN) | Deborah Rodríguez (PUR); Ana Villanueva (DOM) |
| Under 55kg | Lorena Mendoza (MEX) | Stella Urango (COL) | Karina Diaz (DOM); Esther Micheo (GUA) |
| Under 61kg | Ana Montilla (DOM) | Marisca Verspaget (AHO) | Merillela Arreola (MEX); Magalis Medina (PUR) |
| Under 68kg | Yoly Guillén (VEN) | Yadira Lira (MEX) | Ashley Binns (CRC); Johanni Sierra (DOM) |
| Over 68kg | María Castellanos (GUA) | Yeisy Piña (VEN) | Diana Salinas (MEX); Rosa Zavala (PUR) |
| Kata | María Dimitrova (DOM) | Silvia Cardenas (MEX) | Amanda Mendoza (PAN); Yohanna Sanchez (VEN) |
| Team Kata | Mexico (Silvia Cardenas, Gabriela Dominguez, Mariana Rodriguez) | Dominican Republic (Maria Dimitrova, Heydi Reynoso, Franchel Velasquez) | Nicaragua (Katherine Arauz, Aixchel Garcia, Eiling Wilson) Venezuela (Elaine Martinez, Yenire Rivero, Yohanna Sanchez) |
| Team Kumite | Venezuela (Yoly Guillén, Thais Moncada, Yeisi Piña, Daniela Suárez) | Guatemala (María Castellanos, Cheili Gonzalez, Esther Micheo) | El Salvador (Ana Marcela García, Ruth Pérez, Elena Rivera, Jennifer Flores); Dominican Republic (Karina Diaz, Luz Redman, Johanni Sierra, Ana Villanueva) |
