= Devon Nicholson =

Canadian professional wrestler

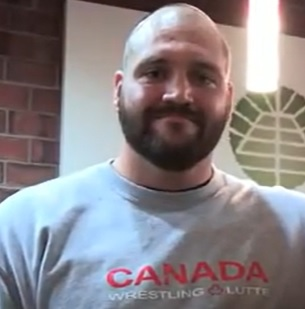
- Nicholson in 2012

Professional wrestling career
- Ring name(s): Hannibal; Blood Hunter; Matt Lust; Adam Lust; Kid Nichols
- Billed height: 6 ft 4 in (193 cm)
- Billed weight: 290 lb (132 kg)
- Debut: 2001
- Retired: 2024
- Sports career
- Sport: Wrestling
- Event: Freestyle
- Club: National Capital Wrestling (Ottawa)
Medal record
Representing Canada
Men's freestyle wrestling
Gold medal – first place	2001 OFSAA	Unlimited
Gold medal – first place	2001 Junior National Championships	97 kg
Silver medal – second place	2011 Canadian Olympic Trials, Greco-Roman	97 kg

YouTube information
- Channel: THE HANNIBAL TV
- Years active: 2013–present
- Genre: Professional wrestling
- Subscribers: 583 thousand
- Views: 312.7 million
- Last updated: October 10, 2026

Devon Nicholson is a Canadian professional wrestler who has wrestled under the names of Kid Nichols, Hannibal and Blood Hunter. He is also a professional wrestling promoter, running the Great North Wrestling company, and has a YouTube channel, The Hannibal TV.

A graduate of the Hart Dungeon, Nicholson has wrestled internationally with several promotions. Stampede Wrestling, IWA Puerto Rico, WWC Puerto Rico, Deep South Wrestling, WWE tryouts and the Ontario-based Great North Wrestling.

The Ontario Superior Court of Justice ruled in 2014 that Nicholson contracted hepatitis C from Abdullah the Butcher in a May 2007 professional wrestling match during which both wrestlers were cut and bled, and further determined Abdullah was responsible for WWE rescinding a contract offer made to Nicholson in 2009 after he was diagnosed with the disease. $2.3 million was awarded to Nicholson as a result of the court's ruling. Nicholson announced in 2013 that he was cured of hepatitis C.

In December 2021, Nicholson repeatedly stabbed a World Class Pro Wrestling (WCPW) referee with a spike, resulting in a severed artery in the referee's head that needed emergency surgery. According to the referee and Nicholson, the referee was scripted to bleed via blading. Various WCPW personnel said that Nicholson had gone off-script with the attack, and Nicholson was banned from WCPW, although Nicholson said that he quit before he was banned, and also said that the referee never indicated that he was legitimately injured.

== Early life ==
Devon Nicholson, from Orleans, attended Cairine Wilson Secondary School and achieved success in scholastic wrestling. He won a gold medal at the 2001 Junior National Championships in London, Ontario. A month later, he gained a spot on the Canadian Junior National Team after winning the National Team trials in Vancouver, British Columbia. Nicholson won the OFSAA wrestling high school championships in 2000 and 2001 without a single point scored against him. Despite amateur wrestling success, Nicholson turned down scholarships to pursue his dream of being a professional wrestler.

== Career ==
Nicholson started his professional wrestling career in 2001 with Stampede Wrestling, after training in the Hart wrestling family dungeon from the age of 19. In Stampede Wrestling, he played the Kid Nichols character, while in the promotion Matrats, he had the ring name Matt Lust. He has also wrestled under the ring name Adam Lust.

In 2007, Nicholson started a professional wrestling company, which by 2015 was called Great North Wrestling.

By 2007, Nicholson had established his professional wrestling character as the madman Hannibal, which Nicholson said was named by Bushwhacker Luke. Nicholson commented: "I really can be a mean person ... And I don't like people very much." At a 2015 Great North Wrestling event, Nicholson wrestled as Hannibal “The Death Dealer", against Soa Amin, with suspended Canadian senator Patrick Brazeau as the special guest referee for the match. After Nicholson won the match, he slammed Brazeau through a table.

By 2026, Nicholson's YouTube channel, The Hannibal TV, had amassed over 500,000 subscribers.

In his career, Nicholson has wrestled in Canada, Puerto Rico, the Dominican Republic, the United Kingdom and the United States. He has wrestled against AJ Styles, Jinder Mahal, James Storm, Abyss, Kevin Nash, Sycho Sid and Tommy Dreamer.

=== Hepatitis C and related incidents ===
After Nicholson participated in 15 tryouts with WWE, the promotion in 2009 offered Nicholson a three-year contract to join them, but rescinded the offer within a month when Nicholson was diagnosed with hepatitis C. In 2011, Nicholson sued WWE for discriminating against him due to hepatitis C; the lawsuit was settled in 2012.

According to Nicholson, from 2009 to 2012 he had taken interferon and ribavirin to treat the disease, but ended the treatment due to the side effects. This is Hannibal, a 2013 documentary about Nicholson, detailed that he first retired from professional wrestling in September 2011 to focus on his health.

Nicholson had wrestled Abdullah the Butcher (real name Lawrence Robert Shreve) nine times from 2006 to 2009; most of these matches involved bloodshed. In August 2007, Nicholson wrestled Shreve in a match that saw Shreve using a fork and coffee pot to bloody Nicholson, who later said that he was hospitalized due to the continued bleeding, requiring 25 stitches. In March 2009, Slam! Wrestling published an article where Nicholson and Shreve were complimentary of each other; Nicholson said he was "very impressed" by Shreve, who was "just so realistic", while Shreve said Nicholson was "really good" and "he has given me a run for my money". In 2011, Nicholson sued Abdullah for $6.5 million in the Ontario Superior Court for negligence, assault, and battery, accusing Shreve of spreading hepatitis C to Nicholson in a May 2007 professional wrestling match. Nicholson accused Shreve of taping a razor blade to Shreve's finger which cut both Shreve and Nicholson, passing the disease through their blood. Nicholson also stated that he did not consent to being cut, and that Shreve had "prematurely ended" his professional wrestling career; he instead became a personal trainer in Ottawa at the Ray Friel Centre.

In August 2013, the City of Ottawa fired Nicholson from his gym attendant job at the Ray Friel Centre, due to an incident where Nicholson met his former wrestling videographer at the complex, whom he had fallen out with; Nicholson "slammed his fist down on the front desk" and later directed a remark at the videographer, while throwing a pool chair in another room between those actions. Later in 2014, Nicholson worked in a group home.

In December 2013, Nicholson announced that he was cured of hepatitis C. According to Nicholson, he received a recommendation in 2012 from fellow wrestler and hepatitis C sufferer Billy Graham to speak to his doctor, Hector Rodriguez-Luna, who recommended that Nicholson undergo experimental treatment with telaprevir, a drug commonly used to treat hepatitis C genotype 1, although Nicholson had hepatitis C genotype 2. Nicholson said that 36 weeks of treatment cured him. Due to being cured, Nicholson restarted his professional wrestling career in mid-2014.

In June 2014, Nicholson won his lawsuit against Abdullah the Butcher, who was found guilty of negligence, assault and battery in the Ontario Superior Court of Justice, as the judge ruled that Shreve had indeed spread hepatitis C to Nicholson in the May 2007 wrestling match. As a result, Nicholson was awarded $2.3 million in damages and costs.

The city government's largest employee union, CUPE Local 503, appealed Nicholson's 2013 firing as a gym attendant. An arbitration panel ruled in December 2016 that Nicholson should not have been fired, instead ruling for a two-month suspension and a job transfer to another city facility. The panel stated that they had "absolutely no doubt" that Nicholson's ongoing hepatitis C treatment (which he was on sick leave for) at the time of the incident "could not help but contribute to [his] irritability, ill temper and mood swings". In August 2017, the arbitration panel directed the city of Ottawa to compensate Nicholson $25,000, and for Nicholson to resume work at the François Dupuis Recreation Centre. In December 2018, the Human Rights Tribunal of Ontario dismissed Nicholson's allegation that the city had discriminated against him by banning him from municipal recreation facilities when he was undergoing treatment for hepatitis C. The tribunal ruled against Nicholson, stating that he had failed to provide sufficient medical evidence about his behaviour and his treatment.

=== Referee stabbing incident ===
On December 11, 2021, at a World Class Pro Wrestling (WCPW) show in Irving, Texas, Nicholson, who was wrestling as the masked Blood Hunter character, competed against Carlito. After the match, Nicholson repeatedly stabbed referee Lando Deltoro, whose real name is Pablo Fraga, with a spike, causing Deltoro to bleed profusely with a severed artery in his skull. According to Deltoro, he suffered hypovolemic shock and a panic attack from the blood loss. Deltoro required seven staples and emergency surgery for the injuries.

According to Deltoro, the script for the post-match event was that Nicholson would hit him with the spike, after which Deltoro would "go down, blade" himself with a razor to induce bleeding, "and then roll out and just wobble off". Deltoro suggested that the incident occurred because he "didn't blade hard enough to [Nicholson's] liking", and also indicated that Nicholson "was not around" backstage before the incident for Deltoro to ascertain "how we're going to do this". Nicholson said that (1) the "sole purpose of why [Deltoro] was hired was to bleed", pointing out that Deltoro did not referee any other matches at the event; (2) that the object he stabbed Deltoro with was given to Nicholson by WCPW, and that Nicholson did not know it was sharp; (3) that he thought he had used his hand to protect Deltoro from the spike; (4) that he thought Deltoro's blood came from Deltoro blading himself, and that Nicholson's mask prevented him from seeing properly; (5) that other WCPW referees were scripted to stop the attack but did not do so; (6) and that Deltoro gave "zero indication" that he was "legitimately hurt," and never asked to stop. In response, Deltoro said that he could not talk because he was "starting to pass out" as Nicholson was kneeling on his back, choking him and stabbing him with the spike.

WCPW referee Colby Cowperthwaite, who pulled Deltoro away from the attack, accused Nicholson of going "totally off the hinges", not listening to instructions, and hiding the spike; Cowperthwaite also claimed that "something was off" with Nicholson that night, as he was not walking properly. Cowperthwaite also accused Nicholson of hiding the spike from the police, so that Nicholson could claim that Deltoro had injured himself, instead of Nicholson injuring Deltoro. WCPW commentator Brittani Nikole Houghtlen stated that Nicholson went off-script by actually using the spike, was pulled off by his valet Blaze in another off-script event, but then "fought with the other refs, got back in the ring and started to stab Lando [Deltoro] more". Fightful reported an anonymous source involved with the show stating that they saw Nicholson holding beer two hours before the incident, then Nicholson stayed "in his RV until it was time for his match, which he took five minutes to arrive to and smelled like booze". WCPW wrestler Clayton Bloodstone accused Nicholson of giving "zero fucks" regarding the incident, while the WCPW wrestlers "all thought [Deltoro] was going to die." Other unnamed WCPW personnel accused WCPW management Kevin Sullivan and Eric Embry of covering up the incident to protect Nicholson; while Cowperthwaite said that Sullivan told him to "kayfabe the cops".

On December 12, WCPW CEO Jerry Bostic banned Nicholson from working with them again as a result of the incident, indicating that Nicholson "took something too far and someone could have lost their life because of it"; on December 13, Nicholson claimed that he had actually "quit" before he was banned, "to focus on running my own company in Canada for now". Deltoro stated that Nicholson called him to request "forgiveness", which Deltoro gave, indicating that he wanted Nicholson to "get help" if he has "demons". Deltoro made a police report but the police closed the case without any charges. Months later, Nicholson retired from wrestling to focus on an acting career.

Deltoro, who continues suffering from depression, headaches, memory loss and physical scarring, launched a lawsuit in August 2023 against Nicholson and WCPW CEO Jerry Bostic seeking "$250,000 for physical pain, mental anguish and lost wages."

== Legal issues ==
Nicholson was arrested for assaulting a woman in August 2022. After reviewing the evidence, prosecutors determined that Nicholson had not committed any offence, and all charges against him were withdrawn. The woman was found guilty of assault, threats and mischief and Nicholson was cleared of all charges.

== Championships and accomplishments ==
- Combat Revolution Wrestling
  - CRW Quebec Championship (1 time)
- Great North Wrestling
  - GNW Canadian Heavyweight Championship (3 times)
  - GNW World Television Championship (1 time)
- International Wrestling Association
  - IWA Intercontinental Championship (1 time)
- Pro Wrestling Illustrated
  - PWI ranked him #387 of the 500 best singles wrestlers of the year in the PWI 500 in 2015
- Southwest Wrestling Entertainment
  - SWE Texas Heavyweight Championship (1 time)
- World Class Revolution
  - WCR Texas Championship (1 time)
- World Wrestling Council
  - WWC World Tag Team Championship (2 times) - with Black Pain
