= Dionicio Gustavo =

Dominican Republic karateka (born 1983)

Personal information
- Full name: Dionicio Gustavo
- Nicknames: Violin, El capitan
- Nationality: Dominican
- Born: 18 January 1983 (age 43) Santo Domingo, Dominican Republic
- Weight: 75 kg (165 lb)

Sport
- Country: Dominican Republic
- Sport: Karate
Medal record
Men's Karate
Representing the Dominican Republic
Pan American Games
| Gold medal – first place | 2007 Rio de Janeiro | Under 75 kg |
| Gold medal – first place | 2011 Guadalajara | Under 75 kg |
| Bronze medal – third place | 2003 Santo Domingo | Under 68 kg |
Central American and Caribbean Games
| Gold medal – first place | 2010 Mayagüez | Under 75 kg |
| Silver medal – second place | 2002 San Salvador | Under 70 kg |
| Bronze medal – third place | 2002 San Salvador | Team Kumite |
| Bronze medal – third place | 2010 Mayagüez | Team Kumite |

Dionicio Gustavo (born January 18, 1983, in Santo Domingo) is a karateka from the Dominican Republic who twice won the gold medal at the Pan American Games.

== Early age and personal life ==
Gustavo started practicing karate at the age of six and joined the National team in 1999. He was influenced by Jackie Chan and Bruce Lee films.

He suffered a minor gunshot wound in his right thigh in 2001 during a robbery.

== Career ==
Gustavo won the gold medal in the 2000 and 2006 Pan American Karate Championships, the silver medal at the 2002 Central American and Caribbean Games after losing to Emilio Oviedo in the gold medal round, and the bronze medal at the 2003 Pan American Games.

He also won the 2007 Pan American Games gold medal in the 75 kg category. This win was accompanied by a promise of a house for his mother who lost her home in 1998 because of Hurricane Georges. For his successful year in 2007, the Dominican Republic Olympic Committee awarded him Karate Athlete of the Year in 2008.

While fighting Chilean David Dubó, Gustavo suffered an injury in his left eye during the 2009 Pan American Karate Championship in Willemstad, Curaçao. He would later receive full support from the Dominican Republic Minister of Sports for full recovery.

Alongside María Dimitrova, Gustavo was awarded Karate Athlete of the Year in 2010 by the National Olympic Committee. That same year he won the gold medal in under 75 kg and the bronze in kumite at the 2010 Central American and Caribbean Games. For this medal he was recognized by the Chief of Staff of the Dominican Navy, where he had the Ensign rank.

On January 31, 2011, Gustavo was awarded by the Dominican Republic Youth Ministry as the National Youth Award for Sport Merits. The Dominican Republic Sports Minister gave him a house in Monte Plata, just before he departed to Guadalajara, Mexico, to compete at the Pan American Games. He was selected to replace Gabriel Mercedes as the Dominican Republic flag bearer, because Mercedes had to compete the next day following the inaugural parade. He not only carried the national flag, but won the gold medal, defeating the American Thomas Scott in the final match. The medal was dedicated to the Sport Minister, Mr. Jay Payano, for his support to the athletes and the national sport.

Gustavo has also been competing in full contact karate with the Karate Combat organization and has a record of 2–1–0 as of 2020.
