= Wilfredo Toro Coliseum =

Arena in Hormigueros, Puerto Rico

- Location: Hormigueros, Puerto Rico
- Capacity: 3,000

Construction
- Opened: 1990

Wilfredo Toro Coliseum (Spanish: Coliseo Wilfredo Toro) is a multi-sport indoor arena in Hormigueros, Puerto Rico. It hosted some of the Taekwondo and Karate events for the 2010 Central American and Caribbean Games.

The arena was opened in 1990 and named after local native Wilfredo Toro Vázquez, who was a former basketball player for the Atléticos de San Germán of the Baloncesto Superior Nacional (BSN) during the 70's and 80's.
