= Karate at the 2010 South American Games =

Karate competition

- Dates: March 26–28

There were 18 karate events at the 2010 South American Games: 9 men's events and 9 women's events. The events were held over March 26–28.

== Medal summary ==
=== Medal table ===
Rank	Nation	Gold	Silver	Bronze	Total
1	Venezuela (VEN)	6	3	5	14
2	Peru (PER)	4	0	6	10
3	Colombia (COL)	3	1	6	10
4	Chile (CHI)	3	1	2	6
5	Brazil (BRA)	2	5	5	12
6	Ecuador (ECU)	0	4	7	11
7	Argentina (ARG)	0	4	3	7
Totals (7 entries)		18	18	34	70

=== Medalists ===
Event	Gold	Silver	Bronze
Men's events
Men's individual kata	Antonio Díaz; Venezuela	Marco Sá; Brazil	Martin Juiz; Argentina
Men's individual kata	Antonio Díaz; Venezuela	Marco Sá; Brazil	Alfredo Moreno; Peru
Men's team kata	Raul Ceballos; Jimmy Moreno; Alfredo Tamashiro; Peru	Alexandre Cavalcante; Klemerson Chagas; Marco Sá; Brazil	Jamir Avila; Daniel Guerrero; William Rodríguez; Colombia
Men's team kata	Raul Ceballos; Jimmy Moreno; Alfredo Tamashiro; Peru	Alexandre Cavalcante; Klemerson Chagas; Marco Sá; Brazil	Luis Contreras; Luis dos Santos; Jean Vásquez; Venezuela
Men's 60kg	Andrés Rendón; Colombia	Miguel Oviedo; Chile	Francisco Javier Vega; Ecuador
Men's 60kg	Andrés Rendón; Colombia	Miguel Oviedo; Chile	Robin Blanco; Venezuela
Men's 67kg	Jean Carlos Peña; Venezuela	Daniel Viveros; Ecuador	José Ramírez; Colombia
Men's 67kg	Jean Carlos Peña; Venezuela	Daniel Viveros; Ecuador	Jesús Paucarcaja; Peru
Men's 75kg	David Dubó; Chile	Esteban Espinoza; Ecuador	Franco Icasati; Argentina
Men's 75kg	David Dubó; Chile	Esteban Espinoza; Ecuador	Willians Quirino; Brazil
Men's 84kg	Caio Duprat; Brazil	Cesar Herrera; Venezuela	Edwin Assereto; Peru
Men's 84kg	Caio Duprat; Brazil	Cesar Herrera; Venezuela	Andres Loor; Ecuador
Men's +84kg	Ángel Aponte; Venezuela	Franco Recouso; Argentina	Franklin Guerrón; Ecuador
Men's +84kg	Ángel Aponte; Venezuela	Franco Recouso; Argentina	Luis Alvarado; Peru
Men's open	José Ramírez; Colombia	Franco Icasati; Argentina	Caio Duprat; Brazil
Men's open	José Ramírez; Colombia	Franco Icasati; Argentina	Franklin Mina; Ecuador
Men's team kumite	Wellington Barbosa; Douglas Brose; Rafael Martins; Willians Quirino; Luiz Santana Junior; Thiago Silva; Brazil	Camilo Cárdenas; Francisco Cifuentes; Leonardo Felizzola; Yilber Oroco; José Ramírez; Andrés Rendón; Colombia	Diego Bórquez; David Dubó; Cristian Figueredo; Nicolás Moscoso; Roberto Salgado; Miguel Soffia; Chile
Men's team kumite	Wellington Barbosa; Douglas Brose; Rafael Martins; Willians Quirino; Luiz Santana Junior; Thiago Silva; Brazil	Camilo Cárdenas; Francisco Cifuentes; Leonardo Felizzola; Yilber Oroco; José Ramírez; Andrés Rendón; Colombia	Ángel Aponte; Robin Blanco; César Herrera; Jean Carlos Peña; Andrés Pirela; Yeremi Rodriguez; Venezuela
Women's events
Women's individual kata	Sandra Salazar; Peru	Yohana Sánchez; Venezuela	Yessenia Reyes; Ecuador
Women's individual kata	Sandra Salazar; Peru	Yohana Sánchez; Venezuela	Patricia Chiron; Brazil
Women's team kata	Wendy Chac; Saida Salcedo; Akemi Takase; Peru	Elaine Martínez; Yenire Rivero; Yohana Sánchez; Venezuela	Marta Castaño; Edith Quintero; Diana Ríos; Colombia
Women's team kata	Wendy Chac; Saida Salcedo; Akemi Takase; Peru	Elaine Martínez; Yenire Rivero; Yohana Sánchez; Venezuela	Priscila Cáceres; Suanny Guadalupe; Yessenia Reyes; Ecuador
Women's 50kg	Gabriela Bruna; Chile	Jessica Cândido; Brazil	Merly Huamaní; Peru
Women's 50kg	Gabriela Bruna; Chile	Jessica Cândido; Brazil	Dougmay Camacaro; Venezuela
Women's 55kg	Jessy Reyes; Chile	Valéria Kumizaki; Brazil	Stella Urango; Colombia
Women's 55kg	Jessy Reyes; Chile	Valéria Kumizaki; Brazil	Jacqueline Factos; Ecuador
Women's 61kg	Alexandra Grande; Peru	Virginia Acevedo; Argentina	Lina Gómez; Colombia
Women's 61kg	Alexandra Grande; Peru	Virginia Acevedo; Argentina	Daniela Suárez; Venezuela
Women's 68kg	Yoly Guillén; Venezuela	Lucélia Ribeiro; Brazil	Verónica Lugo; Argentina
Women's 68kg	Yoly Guillén; Venezuela	Lucélia Ribeiro; Brazil	Ana Escandón; Colombia
Women's +68kg	Yeisy Piña; Venezuela	Perla Salazar; Argentina	no medal awarded
Women's open	Stella Urango; Colombia	Carmen Arias; Ecuador	Alexandra Grande; Peru
Women's open	Stella Urango; Colombia	Carmen Arias; Ecuador	Natalia Brozulatto; Brazil
Women's team kumite	Yoly Guillén; Thays Moncada; Yeisy Piña; Daniela Suárez; Venezuela	Carmen Arias; Priscila Cáceres; Jacqueline Factos; María Reyes; Ecuador	Natália Brozulatto; Lucélia de Carvalho; Jeanis Colzani; Beatriz Janini; Valéria Kumizaki; Lucélia Ribeiro; Brazil
Women's team kumite	Yoly Guillén; Thays Moncada; Yeisy Piña; Daniela Suárez; Venezuela	Carmen Arias; Priscila Cáceres; Jacqueline Factos; María Reyes; Ecuador	Gabriela Bruna; Elizabeth Retamal; Jessy Reyes; Lorena Salamanca; Chile
