= Juan Carlos Segura Just =

Spanish politician

Juan Carlos Segura Just MP

Member of the Congress of Deputies
- Incumbent
- Assumed office 13 January 2020
- Constituency: Barcelona

Personal details
- Born: Juan Carlos Segura Just; 25 April 1960 (age 66) Barcelona
- Party: Vox
- Education: University of Barcelona
- Military career
- Allegiance: Spain
- Branch: Spanish Army
- Rank: Reservist Lieutenant

Juan Carlos Segura Just (Barcelona, April 25, 1960) is a Spanish politician, lawyer, public commentator and author.

He has been a member of the Congress of Deputies since 2020 as a member of the Vox party.

== Biography ==
Segura was born to a Catalan family in Barcelona in 1960. After high school, he obtained a bachelor's degree and PhD in law from the University of Barcelona and worked as a lawyer specializing in commercial law. He applied to the Barcelona Bar Association in 2013. Segura also lectured in law at the ISDE Higher Institute of Law & Economics in Barcelona. Segura also served as a reservist in the land component of the Spanish army and was a member of the Barcelona Defense Delegation.

In addition to his political and legal work, Segura has also authored military and history books including Black Book of Independence, Hispanics and Spaniards in the American Civil War and Soldiers of Four Legs. The war dogs of Spain. He has also been a political commentator on radio and television.

In 2019 media reports surfaced reporting that Segura had held connections to the Youth Front organization and was detained by police after taking part in a violent demonstration with the group in 1980 and also for illegal possession of a firearm. Segura acknowledged taking part in the demonstration and being condemned to 1 year of prison, but denied being a member of the organization. He furthermore claimed the pistol he had been questioned over was a replica.

== Political career ==
Segura first became affiliated to Vox through his friend and colleague Jorge Buxadé. He unsuccessfully stood for the party for the Senate in April 2019.

In March 2020, he was appointed to the Congress of Deputies to replace Ignacio Garriga who had resigned to take up his seat in the Catalan Parliament. Accordingly, Segura represents the Barcelona constituency seat which Garriga vacated.
