= Monster Pain =

Puerto Rican professional wrestler

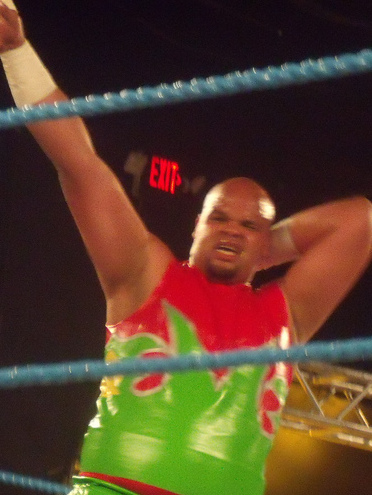
- Torres as Sweet Papi Sanchez in 2009

Personal information
- Born: José Torres; 1982 (age 43–44) Puerto Rico

Professional wrestling career
- Ring name(s): Big Papi Sanchez; Black Pain; Monster Pain; Sweet Papi Sanchez
- Billed height: 6 ft 9 in (2.06 m)
- Billed weight: 389 lb (176 kg)
- Trained by: Cruzz; Florida Championship Wrestling
- Debut: 2004

José Torres (born 1982) is a Puerto Rican professional wrestler, who worked in World Wrestling League (WWL) under the ring name Monster Pain. He was the reigning WWL Extreme Champion. Under his previous ring name Black Pain, Torres is a one-time World Wrestling Council (WWC) Universal Heavyweight and two-time World Tag Team Champion with his partner Hannibal. Their team was known as Terror Incorporated and they were managed by Rico Suave.

== Career ==
=== World Wrestling Council (2004-2008) ===
==== Singles Run (2004-2006) ====
In 2004, Torres under the name Black Pain made his debut for World Wrestling Council (WWC). After La Amenaza Bryan was stripped of the WWC Universal Heavyweight Championship, Black Pain won the vacant title by defeating Lance Hoyt in the finals of a tournament. He lost the title to La Amenaza Bryan on August 12, 2006 in Bayamón, Puerto Rico

==== Terror Inc. And Departure (2006-2008) ====
On November 23, 2006, Pain and Hannibal, collectively known as Terror Inc. defeated The New Starr Corporation (Huracán Castillo and Chris Joel) to win the WWC World Tag Team Championship. They lost the titles to Noriega and Chris Joel on January 20, 2007. On March 17, 2007, Terror Inc. won back the titles from Chris Joel and Noriega. They lost the titles again to Juventud Rebelde (Chris Joel and Noriega).

=== World Wrestling Entertainment (2008-2010) ===
==== Florida Championship Wrestling (2008-2010) ====
In 2008, Torres signed a developmental contract with World Wrestling Entertainment (WWE) and was later assigned to Florida Championship Wrestling (FCW).

On June 3, 2008, after Byron Saxton cut a promo for Torres, he later became Torres' manager. Black Pain was managed by Saxton regularly, accompanying him for matches, and also teaming occasionally with him. He became part of The Saxton Conglomerate, a faction composed of Tarver, Black Pain, Stu Sanders and led by Byron Saxton. Black Pain had his first match with the Conglomerate on October 30, where he teamed with Michael Tarver and Stu Sanders in a losing effort against Johnny Prime, Kafu and Sinn Bowdee. In January 2009, Black Pain broke away from the Conglomerate, and changed his ring name to Sweet Papi Sanchez, prompting a feud with the remaining Conglomerate members.

On January 9, 2010, Torres was released from his developmental contract.

=== Return to WWC (2010-2012) ===
On January 16, 2010, Black Pain returned to the WWC defeating El Bronco in a singles match at WWC Euphoria. On February 13, 2010, he competed in a match against Orlando Colón for the WWC Puerto Rico Heavyweight Championship in a losing effort. In November 2011, Torres joined New Pro Wrestling and was immediately pushed to the main event. The following month, he defeated Michael Rivera to win the NPW World Heavyweight Championship at Cierre de Temporada. Shane Sewell was scheduled as the first contender for the title, with a match being scheduled for January 28, 2012. However, Torres left the promotion under unknown circumstances, being stripped of the championship in the process.

=== World Wrestling League (2013–2015) ===
On April 21, 2013, at the inaugural event of World Wrestling League (WWL), Torres, working as Monster Pain, defeated Bobby Lashley to win a battle royal and become the inaugural WWL World Heavyweight Champion. On September 6, 2013, Torres defended the WWL World Heavyweight Championship, retaining after losing a countout to John Morrison. Two days later, he retained by disqualification in a rematch, winning when Morrison removed his mask. On March 7, 2014, he retained the title by wrestling Mil Máscaras to a no contest. Two days later, Torres defeated Carly Colón and Chavo Guerrero in a triple-threat match to remain champion. On October 18, 2014, at Insurrection, Pain lost the title against Shane Sewell. At Guerra de Reyes, on January 6, 2015, Pain defeated Sabu for the WWL Extreme Championship. On 2015, Pain left WWL and vacated the Extreme title

== Championships and accomplishments ==
- International Wrestling Association
  - IWA Intercontinental Championship (1 time)
- New Professional Wrestling
  - NPW World Heavyweight Championship (1 time)
- World Wrestling Council
  - WWC Universal Heavyweight Championship (1 time)
  - WWC Puerto Rico Championship (1 time)
  - WWC World Tag Team Championship (4 times) – with Hannibal (2), Mad Man Manson (1) and Nihan (1)
- World Wrestling League
  - WWL World Heavyweight Championship (1 time)
  - WWL Extreme Championship (1 time)
