= Lucélia Ribeiro =

Brazilian karateka (born 1978)

Personal information
- Full name: Lucélia de Carvalho Ribeiro Brose
- Born: 12 April 1978 (age 48) Brasília, Distrito Federal
- Height: 1.63 m (5 ft 4 in)

Sport
- Country: Brazil
- Sport: Karate
- Event: Kumite
Medal record
Karate kumite
Representing Brazil
Pan American Games
Gold medal – first place	1999 Winnipeg	+ 60 kg
Gold medal – first place	2003 Santo Domingo	+ 58 kg
Gold medal – first place	2007 Rio de Janeiro	+ 60 kg
Gold medal – first place	2011 Guadalajara	68 kg
South American Games
Silver medal – second place	2010 Medellín	68 kg
Bronze medal – third place	2010 Medellín	Women's team

Lucélia Ribeiro (born 12 April 1978) is a Brazilian karateka.

== Career ==
Passionate about the sport, Ribeiro started practicing karate hidden from her parents. At the age of 21, she won her first gold medal at the 1999 Pan American Games, a feat she repeated three more times, becoming the first Brazilian woman four times gold medalist.

== Personal life ==
Lucélia married fellow Brazilian karateka Douglas Brose in 2012. Currently resides in the city of Florianópolis.
