= Omar Correa =

Uruguayan footballer (born 1953)

Personal information
- Date of birth: 6 January 1953 (age 73)
- Position: Goalkeeper

International career
Years	Team	Apps	(Gls)
1977	Uruguay	1	(0)

Omar Correa (born 6 January 1953) is a Uruguayan former footballer. He played in one match for the Uruguay national football team in 1977. He was also part of Uruguay's squad for the 1975 Copa América tournament.
