= Karate at the 2015 Pan American Games – Qualification =

== Qualification system ==
A total of 80 karatekas will qualify to compete at the games (eight per weight category). There will be four qualification events for athletes to qualify, and the host nation is automatically qualified in each event. A nation may enter a maximum of one athlete per weight category.

== Qualification timeline ==
Event	Date	Venue
2014 South American Games	March 7–9, 2014	(Chile) Santiago
USA- Mexico Regional qualification tournament	March 21, 2014	(Canada) Richmond
2014 Central American and Caribbean Games	November 27–29, 2014	(Mexico) Veracruz
2015 Pan American Games Qualifier	March 18, 2015	(Canada) Toronto

== Qualification summary ==
NOC	Men					Women					Total
NOC	60 kg	67 kg	75 kg	84 kg	84+ kg	50 kg	55 kg	61 kg	68 kg	68+ kg	Total
Argentina		X	X	X	X					X	5
Brazil	X			X	X	X	X	X		X	7
Canada	X	X	X	X	X	X	X	X	X	X	10
Chile	X	X	X	X		X	X	X	X		8
Colombia	X	X	X				X				4
Cuba		X			X					X	3
Dominican Republic	X	X	X		X	X	X	X	X	X	9
Ecuador			X	X	X			X	X	X	6
El Salvador				X							1
Mexico		X		X		X		X	X	X	6
Peru						X	X	X			3
United States	X		X		X	X	X	X	X		7
Uruguay	X										1
Venezuela	X	X	X	X	X	X	X	X	X	X	10
Total: 14 NOCs	8	8	8	8	8	8	8	8	8	8	80

== Men ==
=== -60 kg ===
Competition	Vacancies	Qualified
Host	1	TBD (CAN)
2014 South American Games	2	Douglas Brose (BRA); Miguel Soffia (CHI)
USA - Mexico Regional qualifier	1	Brandis Miyazaki (USA)
2014 Central American and Caribbean Games	2	Jovanni Martinez (VEN); Norbeto Sosa (DOM)
2015 Pan American Games qualifier	2	Andrés Rendón (COL); Maximiliano Larrosa (URU)
TOTAL	8	

=== -67 kg ===
Competition	Vacancies	Qualified
Host	1	TBD (CAN)
2014 South American Games	2	Julian Pinzas (ARG); Israel Santana (CHI)
USA - Mexico Regional qualifier	1	Daniel Vargas (MEX)
2014 Central American and Caribbean Games	2	Deivis Ferreras (DOM); Andres Madera (VEN)
2015 Pan American Games qualifier	2	José Ramírez (COL); Maikel Silverio (CUB)
TOTAL	8	

=== -75 kg ===
Competition	Vacancies	Qualified
Host	1	TBD (CAN)
2014 South American Games	2	Franco Icasati (ARG); Esteban Espinoza (ECU)
USA - Mexico Regional qualifier	1	Tom Scott (USA)
2014 Central American and Caribbean Games	2	Dionicio Gustavo (DOM); Alexander Nicastro (VEN)
2015 Pan American Games qualifier	2	David Dubo (CHI); Juan Landázuri (COL)
TOTAL	8	

=== -84 kg ===
Competition	Vacancies	Qualified
Host	1	TBD (CAN)
2014 South American Games	2	Miguel Amargos (ARG); Jorge Acevedo (CHI)
USA - Mexico Regional qualifier	1	Antonio Gutierrez (MEX)
2014 Central American and Caribbean Games	2	Cesar Herrera (VEN); Jorge Merino (ESA)
2015 Pan American Games qualifier	2	Paulo Andrade (BRA); Andreas Loor (ECU)
TOTAL	8	

=== +84 kg ===
Competition	Vacancies	Qualified
Host	1	TBD (CAN)
2014 South American Games	2	Wellington Rodrigues (BRA); Franco Recouso (ARG)
USA - Mexico Regional qualifier	1	Brian Irr (USA)
2014 Central American and Caribbean Games	2	Anel Castillo (DOM); Jander Tiril (CUB)
2015 Pan American Games qualifier	2	Franklin Mina (ECU); Angel Aponte (VEN)
TOTAL	8	

== Women ==
=== -50 kg ===
Competition	Vacancies	Qualified
Host	1	TBD (CAN)
2014 South American Games	2	Gabriela Bruna (CHI); Merly Huamani (PER)
USA - Mexico Regional qualifier	1	Tyler Wolfe (USA)
2014 Central American and Caribbean Games	2	Eurimer Campos (VEN); Ana Villanueva (DOM)
2015 Pan American Games qualifier	2	Aline De Paula (BRA); Cecilia Yaretzi (MEX)
TOTAL	8	

=== -55 kg ===
Competition	Vacancies	Qualified
Host	1	TBD (CAN)
2014 South American Games	2	Jessy Reyes (CHI); Valéria Kumizaki (BRA)
USA - Mexico Regional qualifier	1	Brandi Robinson (USA)
2014 Central American and Caribbean Games	2	Stella Urango (COL); Leidi Leon (DOM)
2015 Pan American Games qualifier	2	Alessandra Vindrola (PER); Genesis Navarrete (VEN)
TOTAL	8	

=== -61 kg ===
Competition	Vacancies	Qualified
Host	1	TBD (CAN)
2014 South American Games	2	Jacquelin Factos (ECU); Daniela Lepin (CHI)
USA - Mexico Regional qualifier	1	Merillela Arreola (MEX)
2014 Central American and Caribbean Games	2	Karina Diaz (DOM); Franyerlin Brito (VEN)
2015 Pan American Games qualifier	2	Alexandra Grande (PER); Joane Orbon (USA)
TOTAL	8	

=== -68 kg ===
Competition	Vacancies	Qualified
Host	1	TBD (CAN)
2014 South American Games	2	Lorena Salamanca (CHI); Priscila Lazo (ECU)
USA - Mexico Regional qualifier	1	Xhunashi Caballero (MEX)
2014 Central American and Caribbean Games	2	Carmen Harrigan (DOM); Omaira Molina (VEN)
2015 Pan American Games qualifier	2	Natalia Brozulatto (BRA); Eimi Kurita (USA)
TOTAL	8	

=== +68 kg ===
Competition	Vacancies	Qualified
Host	1	TBD (CAN)
2014 South American Games	2	Veronica Lugo (ARG); Isabela Dos Santos (BRA)
USA - Mexico Regional qualifier	1	Guadalupe Catzin (MEX)
2014 Central American and Caribbean Games	2	Yoandra Moreno (CUB); Yeisy Piña (VEN)
2015 Pan American Games qualifier	2	Valeria Echeverria (ECU); Karina Perez Alvarez (DOM)
TOTAL	8	
