= Karate at the 2015 Pan American Games =

- Karate pictogram for the games
- Venue: Mississauga Sports Centre
- Dates: July 23–25
- No. of events: 10 (5 men, 5 women)
- Competitors: 80 from 14 nations

Karate competitions at the 2015 Pan American Games in Toronto, Canada were held from July 23 to 25 at the Hershey Centre (Mississauga Sports Centre) in Mississauga. Due to naming rights the arena was known as the latter for the duration of the games. The competition was held under the kumite discipline, with men and women each competing in five events each. A total of 80 athletes from 14 nations took part.

== Competition schedule ==
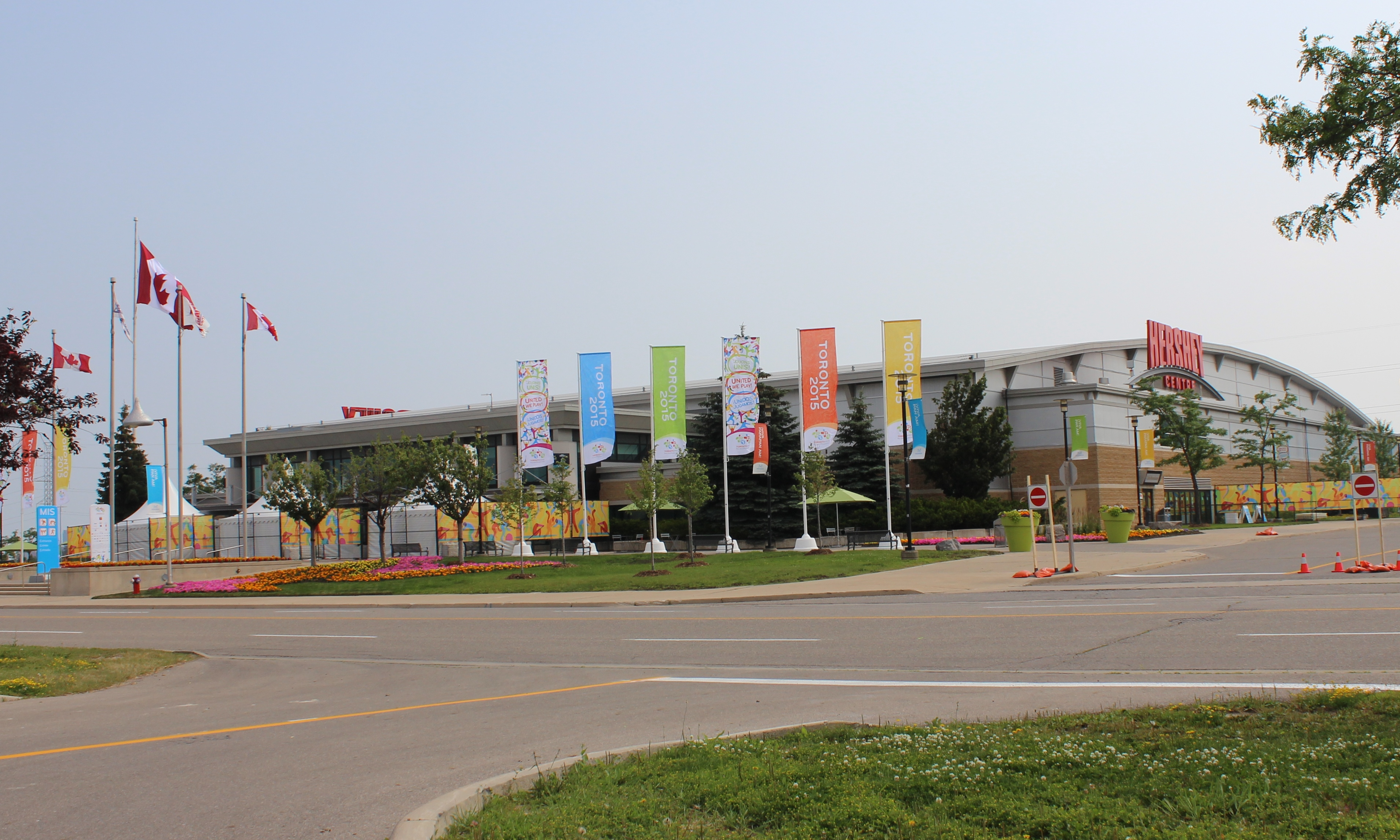
The Hershey Centre (Mississauga Sports Centre), in Mississauga, was the venue for the karate competitions (pictured here during the games)

The following was the competition schedule for the karate competitions:

RR	Round robin	½	Semifinals	F	Final

Event↓/Date →	Thu 23			Fri 24			Sat 25		
Men's 60 kg	RR	½	F						
Men's 67 kg				RR	½	F			
Men's 75 kg				RR	½	F			
Men's 84 kg							RR	½	F
Men's +84 kg							RR	½	F
Women's 50 kg	RR	½	F						
Women's 55 kg	RR	½	F						
Women's 61 kg				RR	½	F			
Women's 68 kg							RR	½	F
Women's +68 kg							RR	½	F

== Medal table ==
* Host nation (Canada)

Rank	Nation	Gold	Silver	Bronze	Total
1	Brazil	3	0	2	5
2	Ecuador	2	0	2	4
3	Argentina	2	0	1	3
4	Dominican Republic	1	3	0	4
5	United States	1	0	2	3
6	Peru	1	0	1	2
7	Venezuela	0	2	3	5
8	Canada*	0	2	2	4
9	Chile	0	1	2	3
9	Mexico	0	1	2	3
11	El Salvador	0	1	0	1
12	Cuba	0	0	2	2
13	Colombia	0	0	1	1
Totals (13 entries)		10	10	20	40

== Medalists ==
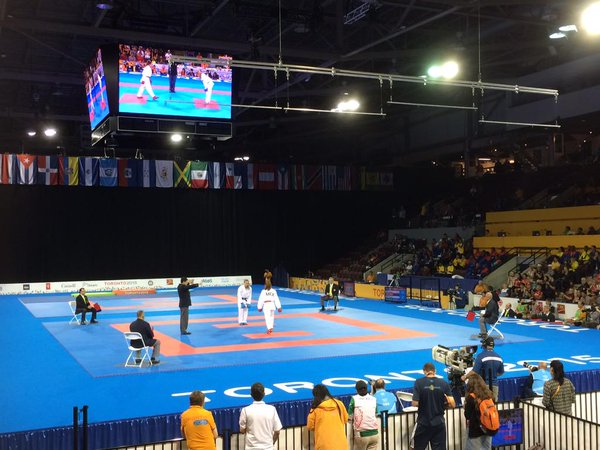
During the competition

=== Men's events ===
Event	Gold	Silver	Bronze
60 kg	Douglas Brose; Brazil	Jovanni Martínez; Venezuela	Andrés Rendón; Colombia
60 kg	Douglas Brose; Brazil	Jovanni Martínez; Venezuela	Brandis Miyazaki; United States
67 kg	Julián Pinzás; Argentina	Deivis Ferreras; Dominican Republic	Maikel Noriega; Cuba
67 kg	Julián Pinzás; Argentina	Deivis Ferreras; Dominican Republic	Daniel Vargas; Mexico
75 kg	Thomas Scott; United States	Alexander Nicastro; Venezuela	Patrice Boily-Martineau; Canada
75 kg	Thomas Scott; United States	Alexander Nicastro; Venezuela	Franco Icasati; Argentina
84 kg	Miguel Amargós; Argentina	Jorge Merino; El Salvador	Andres Loor; Ecuador
84 kg	Miguel Amargós; Argentina	Jorge Merino; El Salvador	César Herrera; Venezuela
+84 kg	Franklin Mina; Ecuador	Anel Castillo; Dominican Republic	Jander Tiril; Cuba
+84 kg	Franklin Mina; Ecuador	Anel Castillo; Dominican Republic	Brian Irr; United States

=== Women's events ===
Event	Gold	Silver	Bronze
50 kg	Ana Villanueva; Dominican Republic	Gabriela Bruna; Chile	Jusleen Virk; Canada
50 kg	Ana Villanueva; Dominican Republic	Gabriela Bruna; Chile	Aline Souza; Brazil
55 kg	Valéria Kumizaki; Brazil	Kathryn Campbell; Canada	Jessy Reyes; Chile
55 kg	Valéria Kumizaki; Brazil	Kathryn Campbell; Canada	Alessandra Vindrola; Peru
61 kg	Alexandra Grande; Peru	Karina Díaz; Dominican Republic	Daniela Lepín; Chile
61 kg	Alexandra Grande; Peru	Karina Díaz; Dominican Republic	Merillela Arreola; Mexico
68 kg	Natália Brozulatto; Brazil	Xhunashi Caballero; Mexico	Priscilla Lazo Nieto; Ecuador
68 kg	Natália Brozulatto; Brazil	Xhunashi Caballero; Mexico	Omaira Molina; Venezuela
+68 kg	Valeria Echever; Ecuador	Camélie Boisvenue; Canada	Yeisy Piña Ordaz; Venezuela
+68 kg	Valeria Echever; Ecuador	Camélie Boisvenue; Canada	Isabela dos Santos; Brazil

== Participating nations ==
A total of 14 countries qualified athletes. The number of athletes a nation entered is in parentheses beside the name of the country.

- Argentina (5)
- Brazil (7)
- Canada (10)
- Chile (8)
- Colombia (4)
- Cuba (3)
- Dominican Republic (9)
- Ecuador (6)
- El Salvador (1)
- Mexico (6)
- Peru (3)
- United States (7)
- Uruguay (1)
- Venezuela (10)

== Qualification ==
A total of 80 karatekas qualified to compete at the games (eight per weight category). There will be four qualification events for athletes to qualify, and the host nation, Canada, automatically qualified in each of the ten weight categories. A nation may enter a maximum of one athlete per weight category.
