= Alicia Hernández =

Mexican karateka (born 1990)

Personal information
- Born: 14 August 1990 (age 35)

Sport
- Country: Mexico
- Sport: Karate
- Weight class: 50 kg
- Event: Kumite
Medal record
Women's karate
Representing Mexico
Pan American Games
Silver medal – second place	2019 Lima	Kumite -50 kg
Central American and Caribbean Games
Silver medal – second place	2018 Barranquilla	Kumite -50 kg

Alicia Hernández (born 14 August 1990) is a Mexican karateka. She won the silver medal in the women's kumite 50 kg event at the 2019 Pan American Games held in Lima, Peru. In the final, she lost against Shannon Nishi of the United States.

In 2018, Hernández won the silver medal in the women's kumite 50 kg event at the Central American and Caribbean Games held in Barranquilla, Colombia.

In 2021, Hernández competed at the World Olympic Qualification Tournament held in Paris, France hoping to qualify for the 2020 Summer Olympics in Tokyo, Japan. She was eliminated in her third match by Alexandra Recchia of France.

== Achievements ==
Year	Competition	Venue	Rank	Event
2018	Central American and Caribbean Games	Barranquilla, Colombia	2nd	Kumite 50 kg
2019	Pan American Games	Lima, Peru	2nd	Kumite 50 kg
