= Bárbara Pérez (karateka) =

Venezuelan karateka (born 1996)

Personal information
- Born: Bárbara Alexandra Pérez Silva; 10 December 1996 (age 29)

Sport
- Country: Venezuela
- Sport: Karate
- Weight class: 55 kg
- Events: Kumite; Team kumite
Medal record
Women's karate
Representing Venezuela
World Championships
Bronze medal – third place	2023 Budapest	Kumite 55 kg
South American Games
Silver medal – second place	2018 Cochabamba	Kumite 55 kg
Silver medal – second place	2026 Santa Fe	Kumite 55 kg
Central American and Caribbean Games
Bronze medal – third place	2023 San Salvador	Kumite 55 kg
Bronze medal – third place	2026 Santo Domingo	Kumite 55 kg
Bolivarian Games
Gold medal – first place	2024 Ayacucho	Kumite 55 kg
Gold medal – first place	2025 Lima-Ayacucho	Kumite 55 kg
Gold medal – first place	2025 Lima-Ayacucho	Team kumite
Silver medal – second place	2017 Santa Marta	Kumite 55 kg
Silver medal – second place	2017 Santa Marta	Team kumite
Silver medal – second place	2022 Valledupar	Team kumite

Bárbara Alexandra Pérez Silva (Note: In this name that follows Hispanic American naming customs, the first or paternal surname is Pérez and the second or maternal family name is Silva.) (born 10 December 1996) is a Venezuelan karateka who specializes in kumite in the 55 kg category. She is a bronze medalist at the World Championships, has won two medals at the South American and Central American and Caribbean Games, and six medals at the Bolivarian Games.

== Career ==
Pérez competed in the women's 55 kg event and women's team kumite event at the 2017 Bolivarian Games held in Santa Marta, Colombia, winning a silver medal in both events. She competed in the 2018 South American Games held in Cochabamba, Bolivia, where she won a silver medal in her event.

Pérez competed in the women's 55 kg event and women's team kumite event at the 2022 Bolivarian Games held in Valledupar, Colombia, winning a silver medal in the latter. At the 2023 Central American and Caribbean Games held in San Salvador, El Salvador, Pérez competed in the 55 kg event and won a bronze medal. In October 2023, she won one of the bronze medals in the women's 55 kg event at the World Karate Championships held in Budapest, Hungary. She defeated Sevinch Rakhimova of Uzbekistan in her bronze medal match.

Pérez competed in the women's 55 kg event at the 2024 Bolivarian Games held in Ayacucho, Peru and won a gold medal. She competed in the 2025 Bolivarian Games in her event and won a gold medal in both the 55 kg and women's team kumite events.

In August 2026, Pérez won a silver at the Central American and Caribbean Games held in Santo Domingo, Dominican Republic. The following month, she competed in the South American Games, where she lost to Valentina Toro in the final, winning a silver medal.
