= Kelly Fernandes =

Brazilian karateka and physiotherapist

Personal information
- Full name: Kelly Brandão Fernandes
- Nationality: Brazilian
- Born: August 25, 2000 (age 26) Niterói, Rio de Janeiro, Brazil
- Years active: 2010–present

Sport
- Country: Brazil
- Sport: Karate
- Weight class: 55 kg
- Event: Kumite
Achievements and titles
Pan American Games
| Bronze medal – third place | 2023 Santiago | Kumite 55 kg |

Kelly Fernandes (August 25, 2000) is a Brazilian karateka and physical therapist. She represented Brazil at the 2023 Pan American Games, held in Santiago, the capital of Chile.

== Biography ==
Kelly Fernandes was born in Niterói, a city in the Greater Rio de Janeiro. She began practicing karate through a social program at her school.

She was a member of the Brazilian delegation at the 2023 Pan American Games, held in Santiago, Chile. In the first round, in the 55-kilogram weight class, Kelly defeated her fellow competitors in the semifinals, Cuban Baurelys Torres and Mexican Ericka Luquea, and tied with American Trinity Allen, achieving the best result in the group and advancing in first place to the final round. Upon advancing to the final round, she was defeated by Chilean athlete Valentina Toro. At the end of the competition, Kelly shared the bronze medal with Colombian athlete Geraldine Peña. In 2024, she graduated with a degree in physical therapy from Salgado de Oliveira University (UNIVERSO), located in São Gonçalo, in the Greater Rio de Janeiro.

== Achievements ==
| Year | Competition | Venue | Rank | Event | Ref. |
|---|---|---|---|---|---|
| 2023 | Pan American Games | Santiago, Chile | 3rd | Kumite 55 kg | |
