= Karate at the 2026 South American Games =

Karate competitions at the 2026 South American Games

- Venue: Invencible Rosario
- Dates: September 23–25
- Competitors: 102 from 11 nations

Karate competitions at the 2026 South American Games in Rosario, Santa Fe, and Rafaela, Argentina, were held between September 23 and 25 at Invencible Rosario, located within Parque de la Independencia in Rosario.

A total of 12 events were contested (six men and six women). The games gave qualifying quotas to the gold and silver medalists from each event for the 2027 Pan American Games karate competitions.

== Medal summary ==
=== Medal table ===
* Host nation (Argentina)

Rank	Nation	Gold	Silver	Bronze	Total
1	Venezuela	6	1	2	9
2	Chile	4	2	1	7
3	Brazil	1	1	5	7
4	Argentina*	1	1	3	5
5	Colombia	0	4	1	5
6	Ecuador	0	2	3	5
7	Panama	0	1	0	1
8	Peru	0	0	6	6
9	Bolivia	0	0	2	2
10	Uruguay	0	0	1	1
Totals (10 entries)		12	12	24	48

=== Medalists ===
==== Men ====
Event	Gold	Silver	Bronze
Individual kata	Ricardo Pérez; Venezuela	Hernán Amaya; Colombia	José Morales; Peru
Individual kata	Ricardo Pérez; Venezuela	Hernán Amaya; Colombia	Luca Impagnatiello; Argentina
60 kg	Kevin Molina; Argentina	Matías Quijada; Chile	Luis Vera; Bolivia
60 kg	Kevin Molina; Argentina	Matías Quijada; Chile	Hermes Moreno; Peru
67 kg	Tomás Freire; Chile	Alberto Gálvez; Panama	Kurt García; Peru
67 kg	Tomás Freire; Chile	Alberto Gálvez; Panama	Juan Pita; Uruguay
75 kg	Jesús Castro; Venezuela	Gabriel Ferreira; Brazil	Julio Ichiki; Argentina
75 kg	Jesús Castro; Venezuela	Gabriel Ferreira; Brazil	Fernando Villegas; Peru
84 kg	Fabián Huaiquimán; Chile	José Acevedo; Ecuador	Filipe Medeiros; Brazil
84 kg	Fabián Huaiquimán; Chile	José Acevedo; Ecuador	Diomid Petrenko; Argentina
+84 kg	Joaquín Sánchez; Venezuela	Rodrigo Rojas; Chile	César Vallejo; Ecuador
+84 kg	Joaquín Sánchez; Venezuela	Rodrigo Rojas; Chile	Giovani Salgado; Brazil

==== Women ====
Event	Gold	Silver	Bronze
Individual kata	Gabrielle Andrade; Brazil	Valentina Zapata; Colombia	Victoria Hernández; Venezuela
Individual kata	Gabrielle Andrade; Brazil	Valentina Zapata; Colombia	Ingrid Aranda; Peru
50 kg	Yorgelis Salazar; Venezuela	Lili Alvarado; Ecuador	Leticia de Almeida; Brazil
50 kg	Yorgelis Salazar; Venezuela	Lili Alvarado; Ecuador	Sofía Cárdenas; Colombia
55 kg	Valentina Toro; Chile	Bárbara Pérez; Venezuela	Sofía Gómez; Peru
55 kg	Valentina Toro; Chile	Bárbara Pérez; Venezuela	Sol Sandoval; Bolivia
61 kg	Claudymar Garcés; Venezuela	María Ichiki; Argentina	Bárbara Huaiquimán; Chile
61 kg	Claudymar Garcés; Venezuela	María Ichiki; Argentina	Nathalia Moraes; Brazil
68 kg	Anastasiia Velozo; Chile	Wendy Mosquera; Colombia	Marianth Cuervo; Venezuela
68 kg	Anastasiia Velozo; Chile	Wendy Mosquera; Colombia	Amy López; Ecuador
+68 kg	Oriana Rodríguez; Venezuela	Roxane Hernández; Colombia	Brenda Padilha; Brazil
+68 kg	Oriana Rodríguez; Venezuela	Roxane Hernández; Colombia	Valeria Echever; Ecuador

== Participation ==
Eleven nations participated in the karate events of the 2026 South American Games.

- Argentina (12)
- Bolivia (12)
- Brazil (12)
- Chile (12)
- Colombia (12)
- Ecuador (7)
- Panama (1)
- Paraguay (5)
- Peru (12)
- Uruguay (5)
- Venezuela (12)

== Results ==
=== Men's individual kata ===
Pool A

Rank	Athlete	Nation	Pld	W	L	Pts	Qualification
1	Ricardo Pérez	Venezuela	2	2	0	6	Gold medal match
2	José Morales	Peru	2	1	1	3	Bronze medal match
3	Christian Pontes	Brazil	2	0	2	0	Bronze medal match

Pool B

Rank	Athlete	Nation	Pld	W	L	Pts	Qualification
1	Hernán Amaya	Colombia	3	3	0	9	Gold medal match
2	Luca Impagnatiello	Argentina	3	2	1	6	Bronze medal match
3	Cristóbal Barra	Chile	3	1	2	3	Bronze medal match
4	Andrés Terrazas	Bolivia	3	0	3	0	

Final stage

Bronze medal match
September 23
(Peru) José Morales	4
(Chile) Cristóbal Barra	1

Bronze medal match
September 23
(Argentina) Luca Impagnatiello	3
(Brazil) Christian Pontes	2

Gold medal match
September 23
(Venezuela) Ricardo Pérez	4
(Colombia) Hernán Amaya	1

=== Men's 60 kg ===
Pool A

Rank	Athlete	Nation	Pld	W	L	Pts	Qualification
1	Matías Quijada	Chile	4	3	1	9	Gold medal match
2	Hermes Moreno	Peru	4	2	1	6	Bronze medal match
3	Bernardo da Silva	Brazil	4	2	2	6	Bronze medal match
4	Wilmer Pérez	Venezuela	4	2	2	6	
5	Iván Florentín	Paraguay	4	0	3	0	

Pool B

Rank	Athlete	Nation	Pld	W	L	Pts	Qualification
1	Kevin Molina	Argentina	3	3	0	9	Gold medal match
2	Luis Vera	Bolivia	3	2	1	6	Bronze medal match
3	Daiver Larrosa	Uruguay	3	1	2	3	Bronze medal match
4	Juan Forero	Colombia	3	0	3	0	

Final stage

Bronze medal match
September 25
(Peru) Hermes Moreno	9
(Uruguay) Daiver Larrosa	1

Bronze medal match
September 25
(Brazil) Bernardo da Silva	0
(Bolivia) Luis Vera	4

Gold medal match
September 25
(Chile) Matías Quijada	2
(Argentina) Kevin Molina	5

=== Men's 67 kg ===
Pool A

Rank	Athlete	Nation	Pld	W	L	Pts	Qualification
1	Tomás Freire	Chile	4	4	0	12	Gold medal match
2	Gonzalo Navarro	Argentina	4	2	2	6	Bronze medal match
3	Jhoiber Chataing	Venezuela	4	2	2	6	Bronze medal match
4	Sebastián Toledo	Colombia	4	2	2	6	
5	Axel Armejo	Bolivia	4	0	4	0	

Pool B

Rank	Athlete	Nation	Pld	W	L	Pts	Qualification
1	Alberto Gálvez	Panama	3	3	0	9	Gold medal match
2	Juan Pita	Peru	3	1	2	3	Bronze medal match
3	Kurt García	Uruguay	3	1	2	3	Bronze medal match
4	Vinicius Rezende	Brazil	3	1	2	3	

Final stage

Bronze medal match
September 24
(Argentina) Gonzalo Navarro	6
(Peru) Kurt García	6

Bronze medal match
September 24
(Venezuela) Jhoisber Chataing	5
(Uruguay) Juan Pita	8

Gold medal match
September 24
(Chile) Tomás Freire	4
(Panama) Alberto Gálvez	4

=== Men's 75 kg ===
Pool A

Rank	Athlete	Nation	Pld	W	L	Pts	Qualification
1	Jesús Castro	Venezuela	4	3	1	9	Gold medal match
2	Joaquín González	Chile	4	2	2	6	Bronze medal match
3	Fernando Villegas	Peru	4	2	2	6	Bronze medal match
4	Juan Landazury	Colombia	4	2	2	6	
5	Amir Rodríguez	Bolivia	4	1	3	3	

Pool B

Rank	Athlete	Nation	Pld	W	L	Pts	Qualification
1	Gabriel Ferreira	Brazil	4	4	0	12	Gold medal match
2	Ethan Barreto	Ecuador	4	3	1	9	Bronze medal match
3	Julio Ichiki	Argentina	4	2	2	6	Bronze medal match
4	Dardo Sánchez	Paraguay	4	1	3	3	
5	Francisco Barrios	Uruguay	4	0	4	0	

Final stage

Bronze medal match
September 24
(Chile) Joaquín González	0
(Argentina) Julio Ichiki	1

Bronze medal match
September 24
(Peru) Fernando Villegas	5
(Ecuador) Ethan Barreto	3

Gold medal match
September 24
(Venezuela) Jesús Castro	2
(Brazil) Gabriel Ferreira	0

=== Men's 84 kg ===
Pool A

Rank	Athlete	Nation	Pld	W	L	Pts	Qualification
1	José Acevedo	Ecuador	4	4	0	12	Gold medal match
2	Edgar Martínez	Venezuela	4	2	1	6	Bronze medal match
3	Juan Macedo	Uruguay	4	2	2	6	Bronze medal match
4	Mohamed Dames	Bolivia	4	1	2	3	
5	Rubén Henao	Colombia	4	0	4	0	

Pool B

Rank	Athlete	Nation	Pld	W	L	Pts	Qualification
1	Fabián Huaiquimán	Chile	4	3	0	9	Gold medal match
2	Diomid Petrenko	Argentina	4	3	1	9	Bronze medal match
3	Filipe Medeiros	Brazil	4	2	1	6	Bronze medal match
4	José Valdivia	Peru	4	1	3	3	
5	Jesús Servín	Paraguay	4	0	4	0	

Final stage

Bronze medal match
September 25
(Venezuela) Edgar Martínez	1
(Brazil) Filipe Medeiros	1

Bronze medal match
September 25
(Uruguay) Juan Macedo	0
(Argentina) Diomid Petrenko	4

Gold medal match
September 25
(Ecuador) José Acevedo	3
(Chile) Fabián Huaiquimán	7

=== Men's +84 kg ===
Pool A

Rank	Athlete	Nation	Pld	W	L	Pts	Qualification
1	Rodrigo Rojas	Chile	4	4	0	12	Gold medal match
2	César Vallejo	Ecuador	4	3	1	9	Bronze medal match
3	Brando Ledesma	Argentina	4	1	3	3	Bronze medal match
4	Sergio Rodríguez	Colombia	4	1	3	3	
5	César Rojas	Peru	4	1	3	3	

Pool B

Rank	Athlete	Nation	Pld	W	L	Pts	Qualification
1	Joaquín Sánchez	Venezuela	4	4	0	12	Gold medal match
2	Giovani Felipin	Brazil	4	3	1	9	Bronze medal match
3	Iván Britos	Paraguay	4	2	2	6	Bronze medal match
4	Gael Muñoz	Bolivia	4	1	3	3	
5	Tomás Dotta	Uruguay	4	0	4	0	

Final stage

Bronze medal match
September 23
(Ecuador) César Vallejo	10
(Paraguay) Iván Britos	5

Bronze medal match
September 23
(Argentina) Brando Ledesma	1
(Brazil) Giovani Felipin	4

Gold medal match
September 23
(Chile) Rodrigo Rojas	5
(Venezuela) Joaquín Sánchez	5

=== Women's individual kata ===
Pool A

Rank	Athlete	Nation	Pld	W	L	Pts	Qualification
1	Gabrielle Andrade	Brazil	2	2	0	6	Gold medal match
2	Victoria Hernández	Venezuela	2	1	1	3	Bronze medal match
3	Ingrid Aranda	Peru	2	0	2	0	Bronze medal match

Pool B

Rank	Athlete	Nation	Pld	W	L	Pts	Qualification
1	Valentina Zapata	Colombia	3	3	0	9	Gold medal match
2	Isidora Gallo	Chile	3	2	1	6	Bronze medal match
3	Jasmín Áviles	Bolivia	3	1	2	3	Bronze medal match
4	Mariana Saldaño	Argentina	3	0	3	0	

Final stage

Bronze medal match
September 23
(Venezuela) Victoria Hernández	5
(Bolivia) Jasmín Áviles	0

Bronze medal match
September 23
(Peru) Ingrid Aranda	5
(Chile) Isidora Gallo	0

Gold medal match
September 23
(Brazil) Gabrielle Andrade	5
(Colombia) Valentina Zapata	0

=== Women's 50 kg ===
Pool A

Rank	Athlete	Nation	Pld	W	L	Pts	Qualification
1	Yorgelis Salazar	Venezuela	3	3	0	9	Gold medal match
2	Magdalena Godoy	Chile	3	2	1	6	Bronze medal match
3	Dahanna Ramos	Peru	3	1	2	3	Bronze medal match
4	Yamila Benítez	Argentina	3	0	3	0	

Pool B

Rank	Athlete	Nation	Pld	W	L	Pts	Qualification
1	Lili Alvarado	Ecuador	3	3	0	9	Gold medal match
2	Sofía Cárdenas	Colombia	3	2	1	6	Bronze medal match
3	Leticia de Almeida	Brazil	3	1	2	3	Bronze medal match
4	Melani Unzueta	Bolivia	3	0	3	0	

Final stage

Bronze medal match
September 25
(Chile) Magdalena Godoy	4
(Brazil) Leticia de Almeida	8

Bronze medal match
September 25
(Peru) Dahanna Ramos	1
(Colombia) Sofía Cárdenas	5

Gold medal match
September 25
(Venezuela) Yorgelis Salazar	8
(Ecuador) Lili Alvarado	0

=== Women's 55 kg ===
Pool A

Rank	Athlete	Nation	Pld	W	L	Pts	Qualification
1	Valentina Toro	Chile	2	2	0	6	Gold medal match
2	Mariana Noreña	Colombia	2	1	1	3	Bronze medal match
3	Sol Sandoval	Bolivia	2	0	2	0	Bronze medal match

Pool B

Rank	Athlete	Nation	Pld	W	L	Pts	Qualification
1	Bárbara Pérez	Venezuela	3	3	0	9	Gold medal match
2	Kelly Fernandes	Brazil	3	2	1	6	Bronze medal match
3	Sofía Gómez	Peru	3	1	2	3	Bronze medal match
4	Giuliana Novak	Argentina	3	0	3	0	

Final stage

Bronze medal match
September 24
(Colombia) Mariana Noreña	1
(Peru) Sofía Gómez	4

Bronze medal match
September 24
(Bolivia) Sol Sandoval	6
(Brazil) Kelly Fernandes	4

Gold medal match
September 24
(Chile) Valentina Toro	1
(Venezuela) Bárbara Pérez	0

=== Women's 61 kg ===
Pool A

Rank	Athlete	Nation	Pld	W	L	Pts	Qualification
1	María Ichiki	Argentina	4	3	1	9	Gold medal match
2	Bárbara Huaiquimán	Chile	4	2	1	6	Bronze medal match
3	Natalia Moraes	Brazil	4	2	2	6	Bronze medal match
4	Alexandra Grande	Peru	4	2	2	6	
5	Nayelis Maya	Colombia	4	1	3	3	

Pool B

Rank	Athlete	Nation	Pld	W	L	Pts	Qualification
1	Claudymar Garcés	Venezuela	3	3	0	9	Gold medal match
2	Jacqueline Factos	Ecuador	3	2	1	6	Bronze medal match
3	Carla Dorados	Bolivia	3	1	2	3	Bronze medal match
4	Yamili Morales	Paraguay	3	0	3	0	

Final stage

Bronze medal match
September 24
(Chile) Bárbara Huaiquimán	9
(Bolivia) Carla Dorado	1

Bronze medal match
September 24
(Brazil) Nathalia Moraes	3
(Ecuador) Jacqueline Factos	1

Gold medal match
September 24
(Argentina) María Ichiki	2
(Venezuela) Claudymar Garcés	8

=== Women's 68 kg ===
Pool A

Rank	Athlete	Nation	Pld	W	L	Pts	Qualification
1	Anastasiia Velozo	Chile	3	2	1	6	Gold medal match
2	Selena Luján	Argentina	3	2	1	6	Bronze medal match
3	Renata Nieto	Bolivia	3	1	2	3	Bronze medal match
4	Cailane Ramos	Brazil	3	1	2	3	

Pool B

Rank	Athlete	Nation	Pld	W	L	Pts	Qualification
1	Wendy Mosquera	Colombia	3	3	0	9	Gold medal match
2	Amy López	Ecuador	3	2	1	6	Bronze medal match
3	Marianth Cuervo	Venezuela	3	1	2	3	Bronze medal match
4	Angieli Tupaño	Peru	3	0	3	0	

Final stage

Bronze medal match
September 25
(Argentina) Selena Luján	0
(Venezuela) Marianth Cuervo	10

Bronze medal match
September 25
(Bolivia) Renata Nieto	1
(Ecuador) Amy López	2

Gold medal match
September 25
(Chile) Anastasiia Velozo	5
(Colombia) Wendy Mosquera	3

=== Women's +68 kg ===
Pool A

Rank	Athlete	Nation	Pld	W	L	Pts	Qualification
1	Roxana Hernández	Colombia	3	2	1	6	Gold medal match
2	Brenda Padilha	Brazil	3	2	1	6	Bronze medal match
3	Valeria Echever	Ecuador	3	2	1	6	Bronze medal match
4	Riana Muñoz	Bolivia	3	0	2	0	

Pool B

Rank	Athlete	Nation	Pld	W	L	Pts	Qualification
1	Oriana Rodríguez	Venezuela	3	3	0	9	Gold medal match
2	Gianella Lozano	Peru	3	2	1	6	Bronze medal match
3	Pilar Calisto	Argentina	3	1	2	3	Bronze medal match
4	Antonella Navarro	Chile	3	0	3	0	

Final stage

Bronze medal match
September 23
(Brazil) Brenda Padilha	6
(Argentina) Pilar Calisto	0

Bronze medal match
September 23
(Ecuador) Valeria Echever	6
(Peru) Gianella Lozano	6

Gold medal match
September 23
(Colombia) Roxane Hernández	2
(Venezuela) Oriana Rodríguez	5
