= Karate at the 2023 Pan American Games – Women's 68 kg =

Women's 68 kg at the 2023 Pan American Games
- Venue: Contact Sports Center
- Dates: November 5
- Competitors: 9 from 9 nations

Medalists
Gold medal	Bárbara Rodrigues	Brazil
Silver medal	Wendy Mosquera	Colombia
Bronze medal	Melissa Bratic	Canada
Bronze medal	Skylar Lingl	United States

The women's 68 kg competition of the karate events at the 2023 Pan American Games was held on November 5 at the Contact Sports Center (Centro de Entrenamiento de los Deportes de Contacto) in Santiago, Chile.

== Schedule ==
Date	Time	Round
November 5, 2023	09:00	Pool matches
November 5, 2023	12:52	Semifinals
November 5, 2023	13:13	Final

== Results ==
The athletes with the two best scores of each pool advance to the semifinals.

=== Pool A ===
Rk	Athlete	Pld	W	L	Pts.
1	Wendy Mosquera (COL)	3	3	0	9
2	Skylar Lingl (USA)	3	2	1	6
3	Anastasiia Velozo (CHI)	3	1	2	3
4	Sol Cabrera (PER)	3	0	3	0

	Score	
Skylar Lingl (USA)	2–5	Wendy Mosquera (COL)
Sol Cabrera (PER)	0–9	Anastasiia Velozo (CHI)
Skylar Lingl (USA)	1–1	Sol Cabrera (PER)
Wendy Mosquera (COL)	7–7	Anastasiia Velozo (CHI)
Skylar Lingl (USA)	8–0	Anastasiia Velozo (CHI)
Wendy Mosquera (COL)	5–0	Sol Cabrera (PER)

=== Pool B ===
Rk	Athlete	Pld	W	L	Pts.
1	Bárbara Rodrigues (BRA)	4	4	0	12
2	Melissa Bratic (CAN)	4	3	1	9
3	Pamela Campos (MEX)	4	2	2	6
4	Marianth Cuervo (VEN)	4	1	3	3
5	Nazira Aponte (BOL)	1	0	1	0

	Score	
Marianth Cuervo (VEN)	0–3	Melissa Bratic (CAN)
Bárbara Rodrigues (BRA)	0–0	Nazira Aponte (BOL)
Melissa Bratic (CAN)	0–0	Nazira Aponte (BOL)
Melissa Bratic (CAN)	1–3	Bárbara Rodrigues (BRA)
Pamela Campos (MEX)	0–0	Nazira Aponte (BOL)
Marianth Cuervo (VEN)	1–5	Pamela Campos (MEX)
Marianth Cuervo (VEN)	0–1	Bárbara Rodrigues (BRA)
Melissa Bratic (CAN)	9–1	Pamela Campos (MEX)
Marianth Cuervo (VEN)	0–0	Nazira Aponte (BOL)
Pamela Campos (MEX)	0–10	Bárbara Rodrigues (BRA)

=== Finals ===
The results were as follows:

Semifinals
Wendy Mosquera (COL)	4
Melissa Bratic (CAN)	0
Bárbara Rodrigues (BRA)	3
Skylar Lingl (USA)	1

Gold medal match
Wendy Mosquera (COL)	2
Bárbara Rodrigues (BRA)	4
