= Kathryn Campbell (karateka) =

Canadian karateka (born 1990)

Personal information
- Nickname: "Kate"
- Born: August 8, 1990 (age 35)

Sport
- Country: Canada
- Sport: Karate
- Weight class: 55 kg
- Event: Kumite
Medal record
Women's karate
Representing Canada
Pan American Games
Silver medal – second place	2015 Toronto	Kumite -55 kg
Silver medal – second place	2019 Lima	Kumite -55 kg

Kathryn Campbell (born August 8, 1990) is a Canadian karateka. She won the silver medal in the women's kumite -55 kg event at the 2019 Pan American Games held in Lima, Peru. She also won the silver medal in this event at the 2015 Pan American Games held in Toronto, Canada. In both events Valéria Kumizaki of Brazil won the gold medal.

In June 2021, Campbell competed at the World Olympic Qualification Tournament held in Paris, France hoping to qualify for the 2020 Summer Olympics in Tokyo, Japan. She did not qualify as she was eliminated in her first match by Trinity Allen of the United States. In November 2021, she competed in the women's 55 kg event at the World Karate Championships held in Dubai, United Arab Emirates.

Campbell competed in the women's kumite 55 kg at the 2022 World Games held in Birmingham, United States.

== Achievements ==
Year	Competition	Venue	Rank	Event
2015	Pan American Games	Toronto, Canada	2nd	Kumite 55 kg
2019	Pan American Games	Lima, Peru	2nd	Kumite 55 kg
