= Karate at the 2017 World Games – Women's kumite 55 kg =

Women's Kumite 55kg at the 2017 World Games
- Venue: GEM Sports Complex
- Date: 25 July 2017
- Competitors: 7 from 7 nations

Medalists
1st place, gold medalist(s)		(Brazil) Valéria Kumizaki
2nd place, silver medalist(s)		(Chinese Taipei) Wen Tzu-yun
3rd place, bronze medalist(s)		(Italy) Sara Cardin

The women's kumite 55 kg competition in karate at the 2017 World Games took place on 25 July 2017 at the GEM Sports Complex in Wrocław, Poland.

== Results ==
=== Elimination round ===
==== Group A ====
Rank	Athlete	B	W	D	L	Pts	Score
1	Sara Cardin (ITA)	2	2	0	0	4	7–1
2	Valéria Kumizaki (BRA)	2	1	0	1	2	2–3
3	Giuliana Novak (ARG)	2	0	0	2	0	0–5

	Score	
Valéria Kumizaki (BRA)	1–0	Giuliana Novak (ARG)
Sara Cardin (ITA)	3–1	Valéria Kumizaki (BRA)
Sara Cardin (ITA)	4–0	Giuliana Novak (ARG)

==== Group B ====
Rank	Athlete	B	W	D	L	Pts	Score
1	Emily Thouy (FRA)	3	3	0	0	6	5–0
2	Wen Tzu-yun (TPE)	3	2	0	1	4	12–1
3	Dorota Banaszczyk (POL)	3	1	0	2	2	5–5
4	Tmeika Knapp (AUS)	3	0	0	3	0	0–16

	Score	
Dorota Banaszczyk (POL)	5–0	Tmeika Knapp (AUS)
Emily Thouy (FRA)	1–0	Wen Tzu-yun (TPE)
Dorota Banaszczyk (POL)	0–1	Emily Thouy (FRA)
Tmeika Knapp (AUS)	0–8	Wen Tzu-yun (TPE)
Dorota Banaszczyk (POL)	0–4	Wen Tzu-yun (TPE)
Tmeika Knapp (AUS)	0–3	Emily Thouy (FRA)

=== Finals ===
Semifinals
Sara Cardin (ITA)	0
Wen Tzu-yun (TPE)	0 HU
Emily Thouy (FRA)	1
Valéria Kumizaki (BRA)	1

Final
Wen Tzu-yun (TPE)	0
Valéria Kumizaki (BRA)	1
Third place
Sara Cardin (ITA)	3
Emily Thouy (FRA)	2
