= Karate at the 2005 World Games – Women's kumite 53 kg =

Women's kumite 53 kg at the 2005 World Games
- Venue: Kfraftzentrale
- Date: 23 July 2005
- Competitors: 8 from 8 nations

Medalists
1st place, gold medalist(s)		(Egypt) Heba El-Sayed
2nd place, silver medalist(s)		(Japan) Tomoko Araga
3rd place, bronze medalist(s)		(Germany) Kora Knühmann

The women's kumite 53 kg competition in karate at the 2005 World Games took place on 23 July 2005 at the Kfraftzentrale in Duisburg, Germany.

== Competition format ==
A total of 8 athletes entered the competition. In elimination round they fought in two groups. From this stage the best two athletes qualifies to the semifinals.

== Results ==
=== Elimination round ===
==== Group A ====
Rank	Athlete	B	W	D	L	Pts	Score
1	Kora Knühmann (GER)	3	3	0	0	6	7–1
2	Lisbeth Castro (VEN)	3	2	0	1	4	10–8
3	Jenny Zeannet (INA)	3	1	0	2	2	6–9
4	Maria Alexiadis (AUS)	3	0	0	3	0	3–8

	Score	
Lisbeth Castro (VEN)	6–4	Jenny Zeannet (INA)
Maria Alexiadis (AUS)	1–2	Kora Knühmann (GER)
Lisbeth Castro (VEN)	4–1	Maria Alexiadis (AUS)
Jenny Zeannet (INA)	0–2	Kora Knühmann (GER)
Lisbeth Castro (VEN)	0–3	Kora Knühmann (GER)
Jenny Zeannet (INA)	2–1	Maria Alexiadis (AUS)

==== Group B ====
Rank	Athlete	B	W	D	L	Pts	Score
1	Heba El-Sayed (EGY)	3	3	0	0	6	8–2
2	Tomoko Araga (JPN)	3	2	0	1	4	9–5
3	Shannon Nishi (USA)	3	1	0	2	2	8–6
4	Cheily González (GUA)	3	0	0	3	0	1–13

	Score	
Heba El-Sayed (EGY)	2–1	Tomoko Araga (JPN)
Cheily González (GUA)	0–5	Shannon Nishi (USA)
Heba El-Sayed (EGY)	5–1	Cheily González (GUA)
Tomoko Araga (JPN)	5–3	Shannon Nishi (USA)
Heba El-Sayed (EGY)	1–0	Shannon Nishi (USA)
Tomoko Araga (JPN)	3–0	Cheily González (GUA)

=== Finals ===
Semifinals
Kora Knühmann (GER)	1
Tomoko Araga (JPN)	5
Heba El-Sayed (EGY)	4
Lisbeth Castro (VEN)	0

Final
Tomoko Araga (JPN)	0
Heba El-Sayed (EGY)	2
Third place
Kora Knühmann (GER)	4
Lisbeth Castro (VEN)	1
