= Karate at the 2018 Central American and Caribbean Games =

Kareta competition

- Venue: Coliseo Colegio Marymount
- Location: (Colombia) Barranquilla
- Dates: 25–27 July

The karate competition at the 2018 Central American and Caribbean Games was held in Barranquilla, Colombia from 25 to 27 July at the Coliseo Colegio Marymount.

== Medal summary ==
=== Men's events ===
Event	Gold	Silver	Bronze
-60 kg	Andrés Rendón (COL)	Jovanni Martínez (VEN)	José Román (CRC); José Rivas (NCA)
-67 kg	Deivis Ferreras (DOM)	Maikel Noriega (CUB)	José Ramírez (COL); Alberto Gálvez (PAN)
-75 kg	Allan Maldonado (GUA)	Jhosed Ortuño (VEN)	Gabriel Vargas (CRC); Darian Díaz (CUB)
-84 kg	Carlos Sinisterra (COL)	Freddy Valera (VEN)	Brandon Ramírez (GUA); Jorge Merino (ESA)
+84 kg	Anel Castillo (DOM)	Diego Lenis (COL)	Herick Granado (VEN); Lazaro Chapman (CUB)
Individual Kata	Antonio Díaz (VEN)	Waldo Ramírez (MEX)	Roy Lee Gatjens (CRC); Nykolai Arango (DOM)

=== Women's events ===
Event	Gold	Silver	Bronze
-50 kg	Ana Villanueva (DOM)	Alicia Hernández (MEX)	Paula Ruiz (COL); Cheili González (GUA)
-55 kg	Genesis Navarrete (VEN)	Baurelys Torres (CUB)	Alanis Carrera (PAN); Ilce Díaz (GUA)
-61 kg	Claudymar Garcés (VEN)	Karina Díaz (DOM)	Stefanny Medina (COL); Elisabet Vasallo (CUB)
-68 kg	Cirelys Martínez (CUB)	Marianth Cuervo (VEN)	Sachiko Ramos (MEX); Joisy Mancía (ESA)
+68 kg	Omaira Molina (VEN)	Guadalupe Quintal (MEX)	Pamela Rodríguez (DOM); Shanee Torres (COL)
Individual Kata	María Dimitrova (DOM)	Andrea Armada (VEN)	Claudia Burgos (CUB); Cinthia de la Rue (MEX)

== Medal table ==
* Host nation (Colombia)

Rank	Nation	Gold	Silver	Bronze	Total
1	Venezuela (VEN)	4	5	1	10
2	Dominican Republic (DOM)	4	1	2	7
3	Colombia (COL)*	2	1	4	7
4	Cuba (CUB)	1	2	4	7
5	Guatemala (GUA)	1	0	3	4
6	Mexico (MEX)	0	3	2	5
7	Costa Rica (CRC)	0	0	3	3
8	El Salvador (ESA)	0	0	2	2
8	Panama (PAN)	0	0	2	2
10	Nicaragua (NCA)	0	0	1	1
Totals (10 entries)		12	12	24	48

== See also ==
- Karate at the 2019 Pan American Games – Qualification
