= Karate at the 2019 Pan American Games – Women's 55 kg =

Women's 55 kg at the 2019 Pan American Games
- Venue: Polideportivo de Villa El Salvador
- Dates: August 10
- Competitors: 8 from 8 nations

Medalists
Gold medal	Valéria Kumizaki	Brazil
Silver medal	Kathryn Campbell	Canada
Bronze medal	Baurelys Torres	Cuba
Bronze medal	Paula Flores	Mexico

The women's 55 kg competition of the karate events at the 2019 Pan American Games in Lima, Peru was held on August 10 at the Polideportivo de Villa El Salvador.

== Results ==
=== Pool 1 ===
Athlete	Nation	Pld	W	D	L	Points		
Athlete	Nation	Pld	W	D	L	GF	GA	Diff
Baurelys Torres	Cuba	3	3	0	0			
Kathryn Campbell	Canada	3	1	0	2			
Genesis Navarrete	Venezuela	3	1	0	2			
Alessandra Vindrola	Peru	3	1	0	2			

=== Pool 2 ===
Athlete	Nation	Pld	W	D	L	Points		
Athlete	Nation	Pld	W	D	L	GF	GA	Diff
Paula Flores	Mexico	3	3	0	0			
Valéria Kumizaki	Brazil	3	2	0	1			
Yaremi Raquel Borzelli	Panama	3	1	0	2			
Tihare Astudillo Aros	Chile	3	0	0	3			

=== Finals ===
Semifinals
Baurelys Torres (CUB)	0
Valéria Kumizaki (BRA)	3
Kathryn Campbell (CAN)	4
Paula Flores (MEX)	1

Gold medal match
Valéria Kumizaki (BRA)	4
Kathryn Campbell (CAN)	1
