= Karate at the 2023 Pan American Games – Women's 55 kg =

Women's 55 kg at the 2023 Pan American Games
- Venue: Contact Sports Center
- Dates: November 4
- Competitors: 9 from 9 nations

Medalists
Gold medal	Valentina Toro	Chile
Silver medal	Baurelys Torres	Cuba
Bronze medal	Kelly Fernandes	Brazil
Bronze medal	Geraldine Peña	Colombia

The women's 55 kg competition of the karate events at the 2023 Pan American Games was held on November 4 at the Contact Sports Center (Centro de Entrenamiento de los Deportes de Contacto) in Santiago, Chile.

== Schedule ==
Date	Time	Round
November 4, 2023	10:00	Pool matches
November 4, 2023	16:18	Semifinals
November 4, 2023	17:28	Final

== Results ==
The athletes with the two best scores of each pool advance to the semifinals.

=== Pool A ===
Rk	Athlete	Pld	W	L	Pts.
1	Kelly Fernandes (BRA)	3	1	1	4
2	Baurelys Torres (CUB)	3	1	1	4
3	Trinity Allen (USA)	3	1	0	4
4	Ericka Luque (MEX)	3	1	2	3

	Score	
Trinity Allen (USA)	0–0	Baurelys Torres (CUB)
Ericka Luque (MEX)	4–6	Kelly Fernandes (BRA)
Trinity Allen (USA)	7–0	Ericka Luque (MEX)
Baurelys Torres (CUB)	10–2	Kelly Fernandes (BRA)
Baurelys Torres (CUB)	1–1	Ericka Luque (MEX)
Trinity Allen (USA)	4–4	Kelly Fernandes (BRA)

=== Pool B ===
Rk	Athlete	Pld	W	L	Pts.
1	Geraldine Peña (COL)	4	3	1	9
2	Valentina Toro (CHI)	4	3	1	9
3	Yennifer Servin (PAR)	4	2	2	6
4	Mickaela Novak (ARG)	4	2	2	6
5	Hana Furumoto (CAN)	4	0	4	0

	Score	
Valentina Toro (CHI)	5–6	Geraldine Peña (COL)
Yennifer Servin (PAR)	10–3	Mickaela Novak (ARG)
Valentina Toro (CHI)	0–0	Hana Furumoto (CAN)
Geraldine Peña (COL)	9–1	Yennifer Servin (PAR)
Valentina Toro (CHI)	6–4	Mickaela Novak (ARG)
Geraldine Peña (COL)	0–0	Hana Furumoto (CAN)
Valentina Toro (CHI)	8–0	Yennifer Servin (PAR)
Hana Furumoto (CAN)	0–0	Mickaela Novak (ARG)
Geraldine Peña (COL)	2–4	Mickaela Novak (ARG)
Yennifer Servin (PAR)	0–0	Hana Furumoto (CAN)

=== Finals ===
The results were as follows:

Semifinals
Kelly Fernandes (BRA)	0
Valentina Toro (CHI)	4
Geraldine Peña (COL)	3
Baurelys Torres (CUB)	8

Gold medal match
Valentina Toro (CHI)	8
Baurelys Torres (CUB)	0
