= Karate at the 2006 Central American and Caribbean Games =

Karate competition

- Location: (Colombia) Cartagena
- Dates: 21-25 July

The Karate competition at the 2006 Central American and Caribbean Games was held in Cartagena, Colombia. The tournament was scheduled to be held from 21–25 July.

== Medal summary ==
=== Men's events ===
Event	Gold	Silver	Bronze
Kata	Antonio Díaz (VEN)	José Martínez (MEX)	David Contreras (COL); Ariel Pérez (DOM)
Team Kata	El Salvador (Williams Serrano, Aaron Pérez, Ricado Ayala)	Guatemala (Juan Valdés, Pedro Marroquín, Marcos Romero)	Nicaragua (Emmet Lang, Marlon Leyton, Norlan Vallecillo); Mexico (Armando Medina, Emilio Oviedo, Alfonso Uzcanda)
Under 60kg	Andrés Rendón (COL)	Eynar Tamames (CUB)	Jesús Rodríguez (PUR); Alberto Zabala (DOM)
Under 65kg	Luis Plumacher (VEN)	Alberto Mancebo (DOM)	Leonardo Felizola (COL); Gerardo Martínez (CUB)
Under 70kg	Jean Carlos Peña (VEN)	Emilio Oviedo (MEX)	José Ramírez (COL); Yordanis Torres (CUB)
Under 75kg	Léster Zamora (CUB)	Rodolfo Rodríguez (VEN)	Emmet Lang (NCA); Williams Serrano (ESA)
Under 80kg	Omar Correa (PUR)	Yilesis Márquez (CUB)	Yilber Ocoro (COL); Rubel Salomón (DOM)
Over 80kg	Midiet Roque (CUB)	Francisco Cifuentes (COL)	Mario Toro (VEN); Nelson González (PUR)
Open	José Ramírez (COL)	Yordanis Torres (CUB)	Rubel Salomón (DOM); Emilio Oviedo (MEX)
Team Kumite	Cuba (Eynar Tamames, Gerardo Martínez, Yilesis Márquez, Midiet Roque, Jander Tiril, Yordanis Torres, Léster Zamora)	Colombia (Herbin Amud, Francisco Cifuentes, Leonardo Felizola, Yilber Ocoro, José Ramírez, Andrés Rendón, David Contreras)	Venezuela (César Herrera, Jean Carlos Peña, Luis Plumacher, Rodolfo Rodríguez, Mario Toro, Carlos Puerta, Antonio Díaz); El Salvador (Carlos Galán, Robert Ortiz, José Paz, Aaron Pérez, Williams Serrano, Alberto Barillas, Ricardo Ayala)

=== Women's events ===
Event	Gold	Silver	Bronze
Kata	María Dimitrova (DOM)	Melissa Belo (COL)	María Mena (GUA); Yohanna Sánchez (VEN)
Team Kata	Colombia (Melissa Bello, Lina Gómez, Diana Muñoz)	Guatemala (María Mena, Cheili González, María Castellanos)	Mexico (Berta Gutiérrez, María Gutiérrez, Yadira Lira); Trinidad and Tobago (Nataki Hypolite, Tamara Joseph, Nicole Lambie)
Under 53kg	Beisy Quintana (CUB)	Marta Embriz (VEN)	Diana Muñoz (COL); Lisbeth Castro (VEN)
Under 60kg	Yulisma Kindelán (CUB)	Karyu Torres (VEN)	Berta Gutiérrez (MEX); Ana Escandón (COL)
Over 60kg	Yoly Guillen (VEN)	Luz Redman (DOM)	María Gutiérrez (MEX); María Castellanos (GUA)
Open	Yaneya Gutiérrez (CUB)	Johanni Sierra (DOM)	Cheili González (GUA); Yadira Lira (MEX)
Team Kumite	Dominican Republic (Luz Redman, Johanni Sierra, Ana Villanueva, María Dimitrova)	Venezuela (Lisbeth Castro, Yoly Guillén, Karyu Torres, Yohana Sánchez)	Colombia (Melissa Bello, Ana Escandón, Lina Gómez, Diana Muñoz); Cuba (Yaneya Gutiérrez, Yulisma Kindelán, Yuneisy Miranda, Beisy Quintana)
