= Sara Cardin =

Italian karateka (born 1987)

Personal information
- Nationality: Italian
- Born: 27 January 1987 (age 39) Conegliano, Italy

Sport
- Sport: Karate
- Club: C.S. Esercito
Medal record
Event	1st	2nd	3rd
World Championships	1	1	0
European Championships	3	3	1
Mediterranean Games	0	2	0
World Games	0	0	1
Total	4	6	2

Sara Cardin (born 27 January 1987) is an Italian karateka world champion at senior level at the World Karate Championships.

In 2021, she competed at the World Olympic Qualification Tournament held in Paris, France hoping to qualify for the 2020 Summer Olympics in Tokyo, Japan.

== Achievements ==
Year	Competition	Venue	Rank	Event
2009	Mediterranean Games	(Poland) Wrocław	2nd	Kumite 50 kg
2010	European Championships	(Greece) Athens	1st	Kumite 55 kg
2010	World Championships	(Serbia) Belgrade	2nd	Kumite 55 kg
2013	European Championships	(Hungary) Budapest	2nd	Kumite 55 kg
2014	European Championships	(Finland) Tampere	1st	Kumite 55 kg
2014	World Championships	(Germany) Bremen	1st	Kumite 55 kg
2016	European Championships	(France) Montpellier	1st	Kumite 55 kg
2017	European Championships	(Turkey) Kocaeli	2nd	Kumite 55 kg
2017	World Games	(Poland) Wrocław	3rd	Kumite 55 kg
2018	European Championships	(Serbia) Novi Sad	3rd	Kumite 55 kg
2018	European Championships	(Serbia) Novi Sad	2nd	Team kumite
2018	Mediterranean Games	(Spain) Tarragona	2nd	Kumite 55 kg
