= Karate at the 2019 Pan American Games – Women's 50 kg =

Women's 50 kg at the 2019 Pan American Games
- Venue: Polideportivo de Villa El Salvador
- Dates: August 10
- Competitors: 8 from 8 nations

Medalists
Gold medal	Shannon Nishi	United States
Silver medal	Alicia Hernández	Mexico
Bronze medal	Cheili González	Guatemala
Bronze medal	Jéssica de Paula	Brazil

The women's 50 kg competition of the karate events at the 2019 Pan American Games in Lima, Peru was held on August 10 at the Polideportivo de Villa El Salvador.

== Results ==
=== Pool 1 ===
Athlete	Nation	Pld	W	D	L	Points		
Athlete	Nation	Pld	W	D	L	GF	GA	Diff
Shannon Nishi	United States	3	3	0	0	7	1	+6
Jéssica de Paula	Brazil	3	2	0	1	11	4	+7
Selene Eliset Rodriguez	Peru	3	1	0	2	11	9	+2
Yamila Benítez	Argentina	3	0	0	3	1	16	-15

	Score	
Selene Eliset Rodriguez (PER)	3–5	Jéssica de Paula (BRA)
Shannon Nishi (USA)	3–0	Yamila Benítez (ARG)
Selene Eliset Rodriguez (PER)	1–3	Shannon Nishi (USA)
Yamila Benítez (ARG)	0–6	Jéssica de Paula (BRA)
Selene Eliset Rodriguez (PER)	7–1	Yamila Benítez (ARG)
Jéssica de Paula (BRA)	0–1	Shannon Nishi (USA)

=== Pool 2 ===
Athlete	Nation	Pld	W	D	L	Points		
Athlete	Nation	Pld	W	D	L	GF	GA	Diff
Alicia Hernández	Mexico	3	3	0	0	5	2	+3
Cheili González	Guatemala	3	2	0	1	5	2	+3
Ana Villanueva	Dominican Republic	3	1	0	2	6	3	+3
Leyla Servín	Paraguay	3	0	0	3	0	9	-9

	Score	
Ana Villanueva (DOM)	2–2	Alicia Hernández (MEX)
Cheili González (GUA)	4–0	Leyla Servín (PAR)
Ana Villanueva (DOM)	0–1	Cheili González (GUA)
Leyla Servín (PAR)	0–1	Alicia Hernández (MEX)
Ana Villanueva (DOM)	4–0	Leyla Servín (PAR)
Alicia Hernández (MEX)	2–0	Cheili González (GUA)

=== Finals ===
Semifinals
Shannon Nishi (USA)	3
Cheili González (GUA)	2
Jéssica de Paula (BRA)	1
Alicia Hernández (MEX)	2

Gold medal match
Shannon Nishi (USA)	2
Alicia Hernández (MEX)	0
