= Karate at the 2014 Central American and Caribbean Games =

- Venue: Coatzacoalcos Convention Center
- Location: (Mexico) Veracruz
- Dates: 27-29 November

The karate competition at the 2014 Central American and Caribbean Games was held in Veracruz, Mexico

The tournament was scheduled to be held from 27 to 29 November at the Coatzacoalcos Convention Center.

== Medal summary ==
=== Men's events ===
Event	Gold	Silver	Bronze
Under 60 kg	Jovanni Martínez (VEN)	Norberto Sosa (DOM)	Listmar Licea (CUB); Arturo Estrada (MEX)
Under 67 kg	Deivis Ferreras (DOM)	Andres Madera (VEN)	José Ramírez (COL); Carlos Galan (ESA)
Under 75 kg	Dionicio Gustavo (DOM)	Alexander Nicastro (VEN)	Sebastián Rendón (COL); Aaron Pérez (ESA)
Under 84 kg	Cesar Herrera (VEN)	Jorge Merino (ESA)	Jorge Pérez (DOM); Antonio Gutiérrez (MEX)
Over 84 kg	Anel Castillo (DOM)	Jander Tiril (CUB)	Alejandro Abdalla (GUA); Víctor Carbajal (MEX)
Kata	Antonio Díaz (VEN)	Waldo Ramírez (MEX)	Alejandro Paulino (PUR); Guido Abdalla (GUA)
Team Kata	Costa Rica (CRC)	Nicaragua (NCA)	Guatemala (GUA); El Salvador (ESA)

=== Women's events ===
Event	Gold	Silver	Bronze
Under 50 kg	Eurimer Campos (VEN)	Ana Villanueva (DOM)	Lilia Angulo (COL); Cheili González (GUA)
Under 55 kg	Stella Urango (COL)	Leidi León (DOM)	Ilce Diaz (GUA); Rubí Martínez (MEX)
Under 61 kg	Karina Diaz (DOM)	Franyerlin Brito (VEN)	Rita Cancel (PUR); Yanet Franquiz (CUB)
Under 68 kg	Carmen Harrigan (DOM)	Xhunashi Caballero (MEX)	Cirelys Martinez (CUB); Omaira Molina (VEN)
Over 68 kg	Guadalupe Quintal (MEX)	Yoandra Moreno (CUB)	Yeisy Pina (VEN); Sayaka Osorio (COL)
Kata	María Dimitrova (DOM)	Xatzi Trujillo (MEX)	Elaine Martínez (VEN); Elena Rivera (ESA)
Team Kata	Mexico (MEX)	El Salvador (ESA)	Nicaragua (NCA)

== Medal table ==
* Host nation (Mexico)

Rank	Nation	Gold	Silver	Bronze	Total
1	Dominican Republic (DOM)	6	3	1	10
2	Venezuela (VEN)	4	3	3	10
3	Mexico (MEX)*	2	3	4	9
4	Colombia (COL)	1	0	4	5
5	Costa Rica (CRC)	1	0	0	1
6	El Salvador (ESA)	0	2	4	6
7	Cuba (CUB)	0	2	3	5
8	Nicaragua (NCA)	0	1	1	2
9	Guatemala (GUA)	0	0	5	5
10	Puerto Rico (PUR)	0	0	2	2
Totals (10 entries)		14	14	27	55
