= Dorota Banaszczyk =

Polish karateka (born 1997)

Personal information
- Nationality: Polish
- Born: 27 January 1997 (age 29) Łódź, Poland

Sport
- Sport: Karate Kumite
- Weight class: -55 kilogramme (kg)
- Rank: Black Belt
- Team: Olimp Łódź
Medal record
Representing Poland
Women's Karate
World Championships
Gold medal – first place	2018 Madrid	55 kg

Dorota Banaszczyk (born 1997 in Łódź, Poland) is a Polish karate athlete competing in kumite -55 kg division. Her biggest success is the gold medal of the world championships of seniors in 2018 in the kumite competition individually, cat. 55 kg.

In 2017, she competed in the women's kumite 55 kg event at the 2017 World Games held in Wrocław, Poland.

In June 2021, she competed at the World Olympic Qualification Tournament held in Paris, France hoping to qualify for the 2020 Summer Olympics in Tokyo, Japan. In November 2021, she competed in the women's 61 kg event at the 2021 World Karate Championships held in Dubai, United Arab Emirates.

== Achievements ==
2018

- Gold 24th World Karate championship - (ESP) - Kumite -55 kg

2019

- Silver Karatei Premier League PARIS 2019 - (FRA) - Kumite -55 kg

2017

- Gold 10th WKF Training Camp & Karatei Youth CUP (CRO) - Kumite -55 kg

2017

- Bronze 4TH EKF Junior, Cadet and U21 Championship (BUL) - Kumite -55 kg

2013

- Gold Karatei Premier League and Youth World Cup 2013 – Grand Final - Salzburg 2013 (AUT) - Kumite -55 kg
