= Paula Flores =

Mexican karateka (born 1994)

Personal information
- Full name: Paula Ivonne Flores González Rubio
- Born: 24 January 1994 (age 32)

Sport
- Country: Mexico
- Sport: Karate
- Weight class: 55 kg
- Event: Kumite
Medal record
Women's karate
Representing Mexico
Pan American Games
Bronze medal – third place	2019 Lima	Kumite -55 kg

Paula Ivonne Flores González Rubio (born 24 January 1994) is a Mexican karateka. She won one of the bronze medals in the women's kumite -55 kg event at the 2019 Pan American Games held in Lima, Peru.

== Achievements ==
Year	Competition	Venue	Rank	Event
2019	Pan American Games	Lima, Peru	3rd	Kumite 55 kg
