= Karate at the 2014 South American Games =

Karate competition

- Dates: March 7-9

There were 10 karate events at the 2014 South American Games in Santiago, Chile: 5 men's events and 5 women's events. The events were held over March 7–9.

== Medal summary ==
=== Medal table ===
Rank	Nation	Gold	Silver	Bronze	Total
1	Venezuela (VEN)	3	1	4	8
2	Chile (CHI)	2	2	5	9
3	Argentina (ARG)	2	1	3	6
4	Brazil (BRA)	2	0	3	5
5	Ecuador (ECU)	1	2	0	3
6	Colombia (COL)	0	4	3	7
7	Paraguay (PAR)	0	0	1	1
7	Peru (PER)	0	0	1	1
Totals (8 entries)		**10**	**10**	**20**	**40**

=== Men's events ===
Athletes in bold have qualified to compete at the 2015 Pan American Games in Toronto, Canada. Both Venezuela and Colombia elected to use the 2014 Central American and Caribbean Games as their qualifying event and thus are ineligible to qualify athletes here.

Event	Gold	Silver	Bronze
60 kg	**Douglas Brose**; Brazil	**Miguel Soffia**; Chile	Jovanni Martinez; Venezuela; Andrés Rendón; Colombia
67 kg	Andres Madera; Venezuela	José Ramírez; Colombia	**Julian Pinzas**; Argentina; Israel Santana; Chile
75 kg	**Franco Icasati**; Argentina	**Esteban Espinoza**; Ecuador	Leonardo Felizzola; Colombia; David Dubo; Chile
84 kg	**Miguel Amargos**; Argentina	Diego Lenis; Colombia	**Jorge Acevedo**; Chile' Cesar Herrera; Venezuela
+84 kg	**Wellington Rodrigues**; Brazil	Angel Aponte; Venezuela	**Franco Recouso**; Argentina; Alejandro Mellado; Chile

=== Women's events ===
Event	Gold	Silver	Bronze
50 kg	**Gabriela Bruna**; Chile	Lilia Angulo; Colombia	Aurimer Campos; Venezuela; **Merly Huamani**; Peru
55 kg	Genesis Navarrrete; Venezuela	**Jessy Reyes**; Chile	**Valéria Kumizaki**; Brazil; Luciani Zorrilla; Paraguay
61 kg	**Jacquelin Factos**; Ecuador	Lina Gómez; Colombia	**Daniela Lepin**; Chile; Daniela Suarez; Venezuela
68 kg	**Lorena Salamanca**; Chile	**Priscila Lazo**; Ecuador	Carolina Santaya; Argentina; Natalia Ribeiro; Brazil
+68 kg	Yeisy Pina Ordaz; Venezuela	**Veronica Lugo**; Argentina	Sayaka Osorio; Colombia; **Isabela Dos Santos**; Brazil
