= Baurelys Torres =

Cuban karateka (born 1994)

Personal information
- Born: 20 September 1994 (age 31)

Sport
- Country: Cuba
- Sport: Karate
- Weight class: 55 kg
- Event: Kumite
Medal record
Women's karate
Representing Cuba
Pan American Games
Silver medal – second place	2023 Santiago	Kumite 55 kg
Bronze medal – third place	2019 Lima	Kumite 55 kg
Central American and Caribbean Games
Gold medal – first place	2023 San Salvador	Kumite 55 kg
Silver medal – second place	2018 Barranquilla	Kumite 55 kg

Baurelys Torres (born 20 September 1994) is a Cuban karateka. She won the silver medal in the women's kumite 55 kg event at the 2023 Pan American Games held in Santiago, Chile. She won one of the bronze medals in her event at the 2019 Pan American Games held in Lima, Peru.

In 2018, Torres won the silver medal in the women's kumite 55 kg event at the Central American and Caribbean Games held in Barranquilla, Colombia. In 2023, she won the silver medal in her event at the Pan American Games held in Santiago, Chile. She lost against Valentina Toro of Chile in her gold medal match.

== Achievements ==
Year	Competition	Venue	Rank	Event
2018	Central American and Caribbean Games	Barranquilla, Colombia	2nd	Kumite 55 kg
2019	Pan American Games	Lima, Peru	3rd	Kumite 55 kg
2023	Central American and Caribbean Games	San Salvador, El Salvador	1st	Kumite 55 kg
2023	Pan American Games	Santiago, Chile	2nd	Kumite 55 kg
