= Andrés Rendón =

Colombian karateka (born 1980)

Personal information
- Born: 3 April 1980 (age 46)
Medal record
Representing Colombia
Men's karate
World Games
Gold medal – first place	2013 Cali	Kumite 60 kg
Pan American Games
Gold medal – first place	2011 Guadalajara	Kumite 60 kg
Bronze medal – third place	2015 Toronto	Kumite 60 kg
Central American and Caribbean Games
Gold medal – first place	2006 Cartagena	Kumite 60 kg
Gold medal – first place	2018 Barranquilla	Kumite 60 kg
Silver medal – second place	2006 Cartagena	Team kumite
Silver medal – second place	2010 Mayagüez	Kumite 60 kg
South American Games
Gold medal – first place	2010 Medellín	Kumite 60 kg
Silver medal – second place	2010 Medellín	Team kumite
Bronze medal – third place	2014 Santiago	Kumite 60 kg
Bronze medal – third place	2018 Cochabamba	Kumite 60 kg
Bolivarian Games
Gold medal – first place	2009 Sucre	Kumite 60 kg
Gold medal – first place	2009 Sucre	Team kumite
Gold medal – first place	2017 Santa Marta	Team kumite
Silver medal – second place	2001 Ambato	Kumite 60 kg
Silver medal – second place	2001 Ambato	Team kumite
Silver medal – second place	2013 Trujillo	Team kumite
Bronze medal – third place	2005 Armenia-Pereira	Kumite 60 kg
Bronze medal – third place	2017 Santa Marta	Kumite 60 kg

Andrés Rendón (born 3 April 1980) is a Colombian karateka. He was four times Panamerican champion, who won the gold medal in the 60 kg weight class at the 2011 Pan American Games. He also won a silver medal at the 2010 Central American and Caribbean Games, a gold medal at the 2010 South American Games, a gold medal at the 2013 World Games, and a gold medal at the 2018 Central American and Caribbean Games.
