= Valéria Kumizaki =

Brazilian karateka (born 1985)

Personal information
- Born: 15 April 1985 (age 41)

Sport
- Country: Brazil
- Sport: Karate
- Weight class: 55 kg
- Event: Kumite
Medal record
Women's karate
Representing Brazil
World Championships
Silver medal – second place	2016 Linz	Kumite -55 kg
Pan American Games
Gold medal – first place	2015 Toronto	Kumite -55 kg
Gold medal – first place	2019 Lima	Kumite -55 kg
Silver medal – second place	2007 Rio de Janeiro	Kumite -53 kg
Bronze medal – third place	2011 Guadalajara	Kumite -55 kg
World Games
Gold medal – first place	2017 Wrocław	Kumite -55 kg
South American Games
Gold medal – first place	2018 Cochabamba	Kumite -55 kg
Silver medal – second place	2010 Medellín	Kumite -55 kg
Bronze medal – third place	2010 Medellín	Team kumite
Bronze medal – third place	2014 Santiago	Kumite -55 kg
Bronze medal – third place	2022 Asunción	Kumite -55 kg

Valéria Kumizaki (born 15 April 1985) is a Brazilian karateka. She won the silver medal in the women's kumite 55 kg event at the 2016 World Karate Championships held in Linz, Austria. She is also a two-time gold medalist in her event at the Pan American Games.

== Career ==
Kumizaki won the gold medal in the women's kumite 55 kg event at the 2014 Pan American Sports Festival held in Tlaxcala, Mexico. In 2017, at the World Games held in Wrocław, Poland, she won the gold medal in the women's kumite -55 kg event. In the final, she defeated Wen Tzu-yun of Taiwan.

In 2019, Kumizaki won the gold medal in the women's kumite -55 kg event at the Pan American Games held in Lima, Peru. She also won the gold medal in this event at the 2015 Pan American Games held in Toronto, Canada. In both events, Kathryn Campbell of Canada won the silver medal.

In June 2021, Kumizaki competed at the World Olympic Qualification Tournament held in Paris, France hoping to qualify for the 2020 Summer Olympics in Tokyo, Japan. She was eliminated in her third match by Ivet Goranova of Bulgaria. In November 2021, Kumizaki competed in the women's 55 kg event at the World Karate Championships held in Dubai, United Arab Emirates.

Kumizaki competed in the women's kumite 55 kg at the 2022 World Games held in Birmingham, United States. A few months later, she won one of the bronze medals in her event at the 2022 South American Games held in Asunción, Paraguay. In 2023, Kumizaki competed in the women's 55 kg event at the World Karate Championships held in Budapest, Hungary. She was eliminated in her first match.

== Achievements ==
Year	Competition	Venue	Rank	Event
2007	Pan American Games	Rio de Janeiro, Brazil	2nd	Kumite 53 kg
2010	South American Games	Medellín, Colombia	2nd	Kumite 55 kg
2010	South American Games	Medellín, Colombia	3rd	Team kumite
2011	Pan American Games	Guadalajara, Mexico	3rd	Kumite 55 kg
2014	South American Games	Santiago, Chile	3rd	Kumite 55 kg
2015	Pan American Games	Toronto, Canada	1st	Kumite 55 kg
2016	World Championships	Linz, Austria	2nd	Kumite 55 kg
2017	World Games	Wrocław, Poland	1st	Kumite 55 kg
2018	South American Games	Cochabamba, Bolivia	1st	Kumite 55 kg
2019	Pan American Games	Lima, Peru	1st	Kumite 55 kg
2022	South American Games	Asunción, Paraguay	3rd	Kumite 55 kg
