= Omaira Molina =

Venezuelan karateka (born 1991)

Personal information
- Born: 7 September 1991 (age 34)

Sport
- Country: Venezuela
- Sport: Karate
- Event: Kumite
Medal record
Women's karate
Representing Venezuela
Pan American Games
Silver medal – second place	2019 Lima	Kumite +68 kg
Bronze medal – third place	2015 Toronto	Kumite 68 kg
Central American and Caribbean Games
Gold medal – first place	2018 Barranquilla	Kumite +68 kg
Bronze medal – third place	2014 Veracruz	Kumite 68 kg

Omaira Molina (born 7 September 1991) is a Venezuelan karateka. She won the silver medal in the women's kumite +68 kg event at the 2019 Pan American Games held in Lima, Peru.

In 2015, she won one of the bronze medals in the kumite -68 kg event at the Pan American Games held in Toronto, Canada. In 2018, she won the gold medal in the women's kumite +68 kg event at the Central American and Caribbean Games held in Barranquilla, Colombia.

As of 2022, Molina is signed to Karate Combat, where she fights in the women's bantamweight division. She currently holds a 4-0-0 record.

== Achievements ==
Year	Competition	Venue	Rank	Event
2014	Central American and Caribbean Games	Veracruz, Mexico	3rd	Kumite 68 kg
2015	Pan American Games	Toronto, Canada	3rd	Kumite 68 kg
2018	Central American and Caribbean Games	Barranquilla, Colombia	1st	Kumite +68 kg
2019	Pan American Games	Lima, Peru	2nd	Kumite +68 kg

== Karate Combat record ==
Professional record breakdown
5 matches	4 wins	1 loss
By knockout	1	1
By decision	3	0
Draws	0	

Result	Record	Opponent	Method	Event	Date	Rd.	Time	Location	Notes
Loss	4–1	Melinda Fabian	TKO	Karate Combat 43	December 15, 2023	3	3:00	Las Vegas	For the Karate Combat Women's Bantamweight Championship.
Win	4–0	Ana Luiza Ferreira Da Silva	Decision (unanimous)	Karate Combat Season 4: Event 4	June 25, 2022	3	3:00	Orlando, Florida	
Win	3–0	Erica Santos	TKO	Karate Combat: Season 3: Event 7	August 12, 2021	1	1:49	Unknown	
Win	2–0	Anna Laura Prezzoti	Decision (unanimous)	Karate Combat: Episode 11 - Valhalla	December 13, 2020	3	3:00	Unknown	
Win	1–0	Nadege Ait Ibrahim	Decision (unanimous)	Karate Combat: Evolution	September 21, 2019	3	3:00	Orlando, Floria	
