= Anastasiia Velozo =

Chilean karateka (born 1996)

Personal information
- Born: Anastasiia Miastkovska; 2 April 1996 (age 30) Lviv, Ukraine

Sport
- Country: Chile (since 2023); Ukraine (until 2023)
- Sport: Karate
- Weight class: 68 kg
- Events: Kumite; Team kumite
Medal record
Women's karate
Representing Chile
World Championships
Bronze medal – third place	2025 Cairo	Kumite 68 kg
South American Games
Gold medal – first place	2026 Santa Fe	Kumite 68 kg
Pan American Championships
Gold medal – first place	2026 Macaé	Kumite 68 kg
Silver medal – second place	2024 Punta del Este	Kumite 68 kg
Silver medal – second place	2024 Punta del Este	Team kumite
Representing Ukraine
European Championships
Gold medal – first place	2017 İzmit	Team kumite

Anastasiia Velozo (Ukrainian: Анастасія Велозо; née Miastkovska; born 2 April 1996) is a Ukrainian (until 2023) and Chilean (since 2023) karateka who specializes in kumite. Representing the country of her birth, she is a gold medalist in the European Karate Championships. After switching her nationality to Chile, she became a medalist at the World Karate Championships, becoming the first woman from that country to win a medal there.

== Career ==
Anastasiia Miastkovska is originally from Lviv, Ukraine. In 2017, she won a gold medal in the women's team kumite event at the European Karate Championships held in İzmit, Turkey. In 2018, Miastkovska met Chilean karateka Camilo Velozo at a training camp in Ukraine, and in 2019, they married and she changed her surname to Velozo. In 2020, Velozo moved to Chile. In 2023, she became a naturalized Chilean citizen and represented the country at the Pan American Karate Championships in San José, Costa Rica (where she finished fifth) and later at the Pan American Games.

In May 2024, at the Pan American Championships held in Punta del Este, Uruguay, Velozo competed in the 68 kg event and won a silver medal after losing to Janessa Fonseca. She also was part of the Chilean squad that won the silver medal in team kumite.

In 2025, at the World Karate Championships held in Cairo, Egypt, Velozo won a bronze medal in the -68 kg category and became the first Chilean female karateka to win a medal at a senior world championship. She defeated Elena Quirici of Switzerland 12–7.

In May 2026, at the Pan American Championships held in Macaé, Brazil, Velozo won her first continental gold by defeating Hilary Pond. At the 2026 South American Games held in Santa Fe Province, she won the gold medal in the 68 kg event, defeating Wendy Mosquera in the final.
