= Karate at the 2015 Pan American Games – Men's 60 kg =

Men's 60 kg at the 2015 Pan American Games
- Venue: Mississauga Sports Centre
- Dates: July 23
- Competitors: 8 from 8 nations

Medalists
Gold medal	Douglas Brose	Brazil
Silver medal	Jovanni Martínez	Venezuela
Bronze medal	Andrés Rendón	Colombia
Bronze medal	Brandis Miyazaki	United States

The men's 60 kg competition of the karate events at the 2015 Pan American Games in Toronto, Ontario, Canada, was held on July 23 at the Mississauga Sports Centre.

== Schedule ==
All times are Central Standard Time (UTC-6).

Date	Time	Round
July 23, 2015	15:10	Pool matches
July 23, 2015	20:25	Semifinals
July 23, 2015	21:15	Final

== Results ==
The final results.

Legend

- KK — Forfeit (Kiken)

=== Pool 1 ===
Athlete	Nation	Pld	W	D	L	Points		
Athlete	Nation	Pld	W	D	L	GF	GA	Diff
Jovanni Martínez	Venezuela	3	3	0	0	14	3	+11
Brandis Miyazaki	Brazil	3	2	0	1	12	6	+6
Leivin Chung	Canada	3	0	1	2	2	5	-3
Norberto Sosa	Dominican Republic	3	0	1	2	1	15	-11

	Score	
Leivin Chung (CAN)	0–2	Brandis Miyazaki (USA)
Norberto Sosa (DOM)	0–6	Jovanni Martínez (VEN)
Leivin Chung (CAN)	1–1	Norberto Sosa (DOM)
Brandis Miyazaki (USA)	2–6	Jovanni Martínez (VEN)
Leivin Chung (CAN)	1–2	Jovanni Martínez (VEN)
Brandis Miyazaki (USA)	8–0 KK	Norberto Sosa (DOM)

=== Pool 2 ===
Athlete	Nation	Pld	W	D	L	Points		
Athlete	Nation	Pld	W	D	L	GF	GA	Diff
Douglas Brose	Brazil	3	2	1	0	11	0	+11
Andrés Rendón	Colombia	3	2	1	0	4	1	+3
Miguel Soffia	Chile	3	1	0	2	4	5	-1
Maximiliano Larrosa	Uruguay	3	0	0	3	0	13	-13

	Score	
Andrés Rendón (COL)	2–1	Miguel Soffia (CHI)
Maximiliano Larrosa (URU)	0–8	Douglas Brose (BRA)
Andrés Rendón (COL)	2–0	Maximiliano Larrosa (URU)
Miguel Soffia (CHI)	0–3	Douglas Brose (BRA)
Andrés Rendón (COL)	0–0	Douglas Brose (BRA)
Miguel Soffia (CHI)	3–0	Maximiliano Larrosa (URU)

=== Finals ===
Semifinals
Jovanni Martínez (VEN)	5
Andrés Rendón (COL)	1
Brandis Miyazaki (USA)	0
Douglas Brose (BRA)	3

Gold medal match
Jovanni Martínez (VEN)	0
Douglas Brose (BRA)	4
