= Karate at the 2023 Central American and Caribbean Games =

- Venue: Palacio de los Deportes Carlos "El Famoso" Hernández
- Location: (El Salvador) San Salvador
- Dates: 5–7 July

The karate competition at the 2023 Central American and Caribbean Games was held in San Salvador, El Salvador from 5 to 7 July at the Palacio de los Deportes Carlos "El Famoso" Hernández.

== Medal table ==
* Host nation (El Salvador)

Rank	Nation	Gold	Silver	Bronze	Total
1	Dominican Republic (DOM)	3	2	0	5
2	Venezuela (VEN)	3	1	4	8
3	Centro Caribe Sports (CCS)	2	0	6	8
4	Mexico (MEX)	1	3	5	9
5	Cuba (CUB)	1	0	1	2
5	El Salvador (ESA)*	1	0	1	2
5	Puerto Rico (PUR)	1	0	1	2
8	Colombia (COL)	0	6	4	10
9	Costa Rica (CRC)	0	0	1	1
9	Panama (PAN)	0	0	1	1
Totals (10 entries)		12	12	24	48

== Medal summary ==
=== Men's events ===
Event	Gold	Silver	Bronze
-60 kg	Pedropablo De La Roca (CCS)	Jose Luque (MEX)	Juan Fernández (COL) Reiner Palma (CRC)
-67 kg	Andres Madera (VEN)	José Ramírez (COL)	Carlos Chacon (CCS) Luis Torres (PUR)
-75 kg	Allan Maldonado (CCS)	Carlos Herrera (DOM)	Abel Fundora (CUB) Bernardo Solorzano (MEX)
-84 kg	Freddy Valera (VEN)	Carlos Villarreal (MEX)	Rubén Henao (COL) Brandon Ramirez (CCS)
+84 kg	Anel Castillo (DOM)	Diego Lenis (COL)	Pablo Benavides (MEX) Cristian Tello (PAN)
Individual Kata	Cleiver Casanova (VEN)	Larry Aracena (DOM)	Hernán Amaya (COL) Fernando Calderon (CCS)

=== Women's events ===
Event	Gold	Silver	Bronze
-50 kg	Gabriella Izaguirre (ESA)	Sofía Cárdenas (COL)	Irma Delgado (MEX) Barbara Morales (CCS)
-55 kg	Baurelys Torres (CUB)	Geraldine Peña (COL)	Rosario Cortes (MEX) Barbara Perez (VEN)
-61 kg	Janessa Fonseca (PUR)	Xhunashi Caballero (MEX)	Claudymar Garcés (VEN) Maria Wong (CCS)
-68 kg	Guadalupe Quintal (MEX)	Wendy Mosquera (COL)	Luisa Palencia (CCS) Marianth Cuervo (VEN)
+68 kg	Pamela Rodriguez (DOM)	Oriana Rodriguez (VEN)	Shanee Torres (COL) Andrea Ruiz (ESA)
Individual Kata	María Dimitrova (DOM)	Valentina Zapata (COL)	Andrea Armada (VEN) Cinthia De La Rue (MEX)

== See also ==
- Karate at the 2023 Pan American Games
