= Karate at the 2015 Pan American Games – Women's 68 kg =

Women's 68 kg at the 2015 Pan American Games
- Venue: Mississauga Sports Centre
- Dates: July 25
- Competitors: 8 from 8 nations

Medalists
Gold medal	Natália Brozulatto	Brazil
Silver medal	Xhunashi Caballero	Mexico
Bronze medal	Priscilla Lazo Nieto	Ecuador
Bronze medal	Omaira Molina	Venezuela

The women's 68 kg competition of the karate events at the 2015 Pan American Games in Toronto, Ontario, Canada, was held on July 25 at the Mississauga Sports Centre.

== Schedule ==
All times are Central Standard Time (UTC-6).

Date	Time	Round
July 25, 2015	13:05	Pool matches
July 25, 2015	20:05	Semifinals
July 25, 2015	21:01	Final

== Results ==
The final results.

Legend

- KK — Forfeit (Kiken)

=== Pool 1 ===
Athlete	Nation	Pld	W	D	L	Points		
Athlete	Nation	Pld	W	D	L	GF	GA	Diff
Xhunashi Caballero	Mexico	3	2	1	0	9	6	+3
Omaira Molina	Venezuela	3	2	1	0	8	4	+4
Jasmine Landry	Canada	3	1	0	2	3	6	-3
Lorena Salamanca	Chile	3	0	0	3	0	4	-4

	Score	
Omaira Molina (VEN)	4–4	Xhunashi Caballero (MEX)
Lorena Salamanca (CHI)	0–1	Jasmine Landry (CAN)
Omaira Molina (VEN)	2–0	Lorena Salamanca (CHI)
Xhunashi Caballero (MEX)	4–2	Jasmine Landry (CAN)
Omaira Molina (VEN)	2–0	Jasmine Landry (CAN)
Xhunashi Caballero (MEX)	1–0	Lorena Salamanca (CHI)

=== Pool 2 ===
Athlete	Nation	Pld	W	D	L	Points		
Athlete	Nation	Pld	W	D	L	GF	GA	Diff
Natália Brozulatto	Brazil	3	2	1	0	4	2	+2
Priscilla Lazo Nieto	Ecuador	3	2	0	1	6	3	+3
Carmen Harrigan	Dominican Republic	3	1	1	1	7	6	+1
Eimi Kurita	United States	3	0	0	3	3	9	-6

	Score	
Carmen Harrigan (DOM)	0–3	Priscilla Lazo Nieto (ECU)
Natália Brozulatto (BRA)	1–0	Eimi Kurita (USA)
Carmen Harrigan (DOM)	2–2	Natália Brozulatto (BRA)
Priscilla Lazo Nieto (ECU)	3–2	Eimi Kurita (USA)
Carmen Harrigan (DOM)	5–1	Eimi Kurita (USA)
Priscilla Lazo Nieto (ECU)	0–1	Natália Brozulatto (BRA)

=== Finals ===
Semifinals
Xhunashi Caballero (MEX)	4
Priscilla Lazo Nieto (ECU)	1
Omaira Molina (VEN)	1
Natália Brozulatto (BRA)	3

Gold medal match
Xhunashi Caballero (MEX)	0
Natália Brozulatto (BRA)	2
