= Geraldine Peña =

Colombian karateka

Personal information
- Full name: Geraldine Peña Barco
- Born: 23 September 1997 (age 28)

Sport
- Country: Colombia
- Sport: Karate
- Weight class: 55 kg
- Events: Kumite; Team kumite
Medal record
Representing Colombia
Women's karate
| Event | 1st | 2nd | 3rd |
|---|---|---|---|
| World Championships | 0 | 0 | 1 |
| Pan American Games | 0 | 0 | 1 |
| Pan American Championships | 0 | 0 | 1 |
| CAC Games | 0 | 1 | 0 |
| Bolivarian Games | 0 | 1 | 0 |
| Total | 0 | 2 | 3 |
World Championships
| Bronze medal – third place | 2021 Dubai | Team kumite |
Pan American Games
| Bronze medal – third place | 2023 Santiago | Kumite 55 kg |
Pan American Championships
| Bronze medal – third place | 2023 San José | Kumite 55 kg |
Central American and Caribbean Games
| Silver medal – second place | 2023 San Salvador | Kumite 55 kg |
Bolivarian Games
| Silver medal – second place | 2024 Ayacucho | Kumite 55 kg |

Geraldine Peña Barco (born 23 September 1997) is a Colombian karateka. She won one of the bronze medals in the women's 55 kg event at the 2023 Pan American Games held in Santiago, Chile.

In 2021, Peña competed in the World Karate Championships held in Dubai, United Arab Emirates. She won one of the bronze medals in the women's team kumite event.

== Achievements ==
| Year | Competition | Venue | Rank | Event |
Representing Colombia
| 2021 | World Championships | Dubai, United Arab Emirates | 3rd | Team kumite |
| 2023 | Pan American Championships | San José, Costa Rica | 3rd | Kumite 55 kg |
| 2023 | Central American and Caribbean Games | San Salvador, El Salvador | 2nd | Kumite 55 kg |
| 2023 | Pan American Games | Santiago, Chile | 3rd | Kumite 55 kg |
| 2024 | Bolivarian Games | Ayacucho, Peru | 2nd | Kumite 55 kg |
