= Karate at the 2015 Pan American Games – Women's 55 kg =

Women's 55 kg at the 2015 Pan American Games
- Venue: Mississauga Sports Centre
- Dates: July 23
- Competitors: 8 from 8 nations

Medalists
Gold medal	Valéria Kumizaki	Brazil
Silver medal	Kate Campbell	Canada
Bronze medal	Jessy Reyes	Chile
Bronze medal	Alessandra Vindrola	Peru

The women's 55 kg competition of the karate events at the 2015 Pan American Games in Toronto, Ontario, Canada, was held on July 23 at the Mississauga Sports Centre.

== Schedule ==
All times are Central Standard Time (UTC-6).

Date	Time	Round
July 23, 2015	16:15	Pool matches
July 23, 2015	20:45	Semifinals
July 23, 2015	21:25	Final

== Results ==
The final results.

Legend

- KK — Forfeit (Kiken)

=== Pool 1 ===
Athlete	Nation	Pld	W	D	L	Points		
Athlete	Nation	Pld	W	D	L	GF	GA	Diff
Jessy Reyes	Chile	3	2	0	1	12	4	+8
Alessandra Vindrola	Peru	3	2	0	1	11	3	+8
Brandi Robinson	United States	3	2	0	1	10	2	+8
Stella Urango	Colombia	3	0	0	3	0	24	-24

	Score	
Alessandra Vindrola (PER)	1–0	Brandi Robinson (USA)
Jessy Reyes (CHI)	8–0 KK	Stella Urango (COL)
Alessandra Vindrola (PER)	2–3	Jessy Reyes (CHI)
Brandi Robinson (USA)	8–0 KK	Stella Urango (COL)
Alessandra Vindrola (PER)	8–0 KK	Stella Urango (COL)
Brandi Robinson (USA)	2–1	Jessy Reyes (CHI)

=== Pool 2 ===
Athlete	Nation	Pld	W	D	L	Points		
Athlete	Nation	Pld	W	D	L	GF	GA	Diff
Kate Campbell	Canada	3	2	1	0	7	0	+7
Valéria Kumizaki	Brazil	3	1	1	1	4	3	+1
Genesis Navarrete	Venezuela	3	1	0	2	3	9	-6
Leidi León	Dominican Republic	3	0	2	1	0	2	-2

	Score	
Genesis Navarrete (VEN)	0–5	Kate Campbell (CAN)
Valéria Kumizaki (BRA)	0–0	Leidi León (DOM)
Genesis Navarrete (VEN)	1–4	Valéria Kumizaki (BRA)
Kate Campbell (CAN)	0–0	Leidi León (DOM)
Genesis Navarrete (VEN)	2–0	Leidi León (DOM)
Kate Campbell (CAN)	2–0	Valéria Kumizaki (BRA)

=== Finals ===
Semifinals
Jessy Reyes (CHI)	0
Valéria Kumizaki (BRA)	7
Alessandra Vindrola (PER)	0
Kate Campbell (CAN)	4

Gold medal match
Valéria Kumizaki (BRA)	1
Kate Campbell (CAN)	1
