= Shannon Nishi =

American karateka (born 1985)

Personal information
- Full name: Shannon Nishi-Patton
- Born: March 6, 1985 (age 41)

Sport
- Country: United States
- Sport: Karate
- Event: Kumite
Medal record
Women's karate
Representing United States
Pan American Games
Gold medal – first place	2011 Guadalajara	Kumite −55 kg
Gold medal – first place	2019 Lima	Kumite −50 kg
World Karate Championships
Bronze medal – third place	2004 Monterrey	Kumite −53 kg
Bronze medal – third place	2010 Belgrade	Kumite −55 kg
Bronze medal – third place	2010 Belgrade	Team kumite

Shannon Nishi-Patton (born March 6, 1985) is an American karateka. She won the gold medal in the women's kumite 50 kg event at the 2019 Pan American Games held in Lima, Peru. She also won the gold medal in the women's kumite 55 kg event at the 2011 Pan American Games in Guadalajara, Mexico.

== Career ==
In 2004, she won one of the bronze medals in the women's kumite 53 kg event at the World Karate Championships held in Monterrey, Mexico.

The following year, she competed in the women's kumite 53 kg event at the 2005 World Games held in Duisburg, Germany. She was eliminated in the elimination round where she won one out of three matches.

== Achievements ==
Year	Competition	Venue	Rank	Event
2004	World Championships	Monterrey, Mexico	3rd	Kumite 53 kg
2010	World Championships	Belgrade, Serbia	3rd	Kumite 55 kg
2010	World Championships	Belgrade, Serbia	3rd	Team kumite
2011	Pan American Games	Guadalajara, Mexico	1st	Kumite 55 kg
2019	Pan American Games	Lima, Peru	1st	Kumite 50 kg
