= Xhunashi Caballero =

Mexican karateka (born 1989)

Personal information
- Born: 1 November 1989 (age 36) Ixtepec, Oaxaca, Mexico

Sport
- Country: Mexico
- Sport: Karate
- Weight class: 61 kg
- Event: Kumite
Medal record
Women's karate
Representing Mexico
Pan American Games
Silver medal – second place	2011 Guadalajara	Kumite +68 kg
Silver medal – second place	2015 Toronto	Kumite 68 kg
Bronze medal – third place	2019 Lima	Kumite 61 kg
Central American and Caribbean Games
Silver medal – second place	2023 San Salvador	Kumite 61 kg

Xhunashi Caballero (born 1 November 1989) is a Mexican karateka. She won a silver medal at the 2011 Pan American Games and she repeated this at the 2015 Pan American Games. In 2019, she won one of the bronze medals in the women's kumite 61 kg event at the Pan American Games held in Lima, Peru.

In June 2021, she competed at the World Olympic Qualification Tournament held in Paris, France hoping to qualify for the 2020 Summer Olympics in Tokyo, Japan. She was eliminated in her first match by Lynn Snel of the Netherlands. In November 2021, she competed in the women's 61 kg event at the World Karate Championships held in Dubai, United Arab Emirates.

She won the silver medal in her event at the 2023 Central American and Caribbean Games held in San Salvador, El Salvador.

== Achievements ==
Year	Competition	Venue	Rank	Event
2011	Pan American Games	Guadalajara, Mexico	2nd	Kumite +68 kg
2015	Pan American Games	Toronto, Canada	2nd	Kumite 68 kg
2019	Pan American Games	Lima, Peru	3rd	Kumite 61 kg
2023	Central American and Caribbean Games	San Salvador, El Salvador	2nd	Kumite 61 kg
