= Karate at the 2026 Asian Games – Women's kumite +68 kg =

Women's kumite +68 kg at the 2026 Asian Games
- Venue: Toyohashi City General Gymnasium
- Date: 20 September 2026
- Competitors: 8 from 8 nations

Medalists
gold medal	Sofya Berultseva	Kazakhstan
silver medal	Maneewan Butsuwan	Thailand
bronze medal	Leica Al Humaira Lubis	Indonesia
bronze medal	Dina Mustafa	Saudi Arabia

The women's kumite +68 kilograms competition at the 2026 Asian Games took place on 20 September 2026 at Toyohashi City General Gymnasium, Toyohashi. Sofya Berultseva of Kazakhstan defeated Thailand's Maneewan Butsuwan 8–0 in the final to win the gold medal, claiming her second Asian Games title after her victory at the 2022 Asian Games.

== Schedule ==
All times are Japan Standard Time (UTC+09:00)

Date	Time	Event
Sunday, 20 September 2026	12:50	Quarterfinals
Sunday, 20 September 2026	12:50	Semifinals
Sunday, 20 September 2026	12:50	Bronze medal bouts
Sunday, 20 September 2026	16:50	Final

== Results ==
=== Main bracket ===
Quarterfinals		Semifinals		Final
Bonu Egamberdieva (UZB)	0
Leica Al Humaira Lubis (INA)	3	Leica Al Humaira Lubis (INA)	3
Maneewan Butsuwan (THA)	8	Maneewan Butsuwan (THA)	4
Begimai Orozalieva (KGZ)	8			Maneewan Butsuwan (THA)	0
Dina Mustafa (KSA)	6			Sofya Berultseva (KAZ)	8
Sofya Berultseva (KAZ)	9	Sofya Berultseva (KAZ)	2
Arika Gurung (NEP)	7	Arika Gurung (NEP)	1
Yara Naser (JOR)	1

=== Repechage ===
Bronze medal bouts
Begimai Orozalieva (KGZ)	1
Leica Al Humaira Lubis (INA)	6
Dina Mustafa (KSA)	8
Arika Gurung (NEP)	7
