= 2024 Asian Karate Championships =

- Host city: Hangzhou, China
- Dates: 20–22 September 2024
- Main venue: Linping Sports Centre Gymnasium

The 2024 Asian Karate Championships were the 20th edition of the Senior Asian Karate Championship and were held in Hangzhou, China from 20 to 22 September 2024.

== Medalists ==
=== Men ===
Event	Gold	Silver	Bronze
Individual kata	Kakeru Nishiyama; Japan	Salman Al-Mosawi; Kuwait	Jeremy Nopre; Philippines
Individual kata	Kakeru Nishiyama; Japan	Salman Al-Mosawi; Kuwait	Binar Mustafa; Iraq
Team kata	Kuwait; Saqr Al-Dbasi; Mohammad Al-Mosawi; Salman Al-Mosawi; Mohammad Bader	Vietnam; Giang Việt Anh; Lê Hồng Phúc; Phạm Minh Đức; Phạm Minh Quân	Iran; Milad Farazmehr; Abolfazl Shahrjerdi; Ali Zand
Team kata	Kuwait; Saqr Al-Dbasi; Mohammad Al-Mosawi; Salman Al-Mosawi; Mohammad Bader	Vietnam; Giang Việt Anh; Lê Hồng Phúc; Phạm Minh Đức; Phạm Minh Quân	Hong Kong; Chiu Chun Yin; Kwok Ho Him; Li Chi Kong; Tang Yu Hin
Kumite −55 kg	Zholaman Bigabyl; Kazakhstan	Omar Shaqrah; Jordan	Salem Al-Ajmi; Kuwait
Kumite −55 kg	Zholaman Bigabyl; Kazakhstan	Omar Shaqrah; Jordan	Behnam Dehghanzadeh; Iran
Kumite −60 kg	Hiromu Hashimoto; Japan	Siwakon Muekthong; Thailand	Chu Văn Đức; Vietnam
Kumite −60 kg	Hiromu Hashimoto; Japan	Siwakon Muekthong; Thailand	Abdullah Shaaban; Kuwait
Kumite −67 kg	Abdelrahman Al-Masatfa; Jordan	Yugo Kozaki; Japan	Shih Cheng-chung; Chinese Taipei
Kumite −67 kg	Abdelrahman Al-Masatfa; Jordan	Yugo Kozaki; Japan	Mohammed Al-Assiri; Saudi Arabia
Kumite −75 kg	Nurkanat Azhikanov; Kazakhstan	Kuvonchbek Mukhammadiev; Uzbekistan	Dawut Nazmyradow; Turkmenistan
Kumite −75 kg	Nurkanat Azhikanov; Kazakhstan	Kuvonchbek Mukhammadiev; Uzbekistan	Bahman Asgari; Iran
Kumite −84 kg	Rikito Shimada; Japan	Mehdi Khodabakhshi; Iran	Anas Al-Zahrani; Saudi Arabia
Kumite −84 kg	Rikito Shimada; Japan	Mehdi Khodabakhshi; Iran	Mohammad Al-Jafari; Jordan
Kumite +84 kg	Saleh Abazari; Iran	Kyo Hirata; Japan	Hamzah Al-Bargawi; Saudi Arabia
Kumite +84 kg	Saleh Abazari; Iran	Kyo Hirata; Japan	Teerawat Kangtong; Thailand
Team kumite	Japan; Yosuke Abe; Kyo Hirata; Yugo Kozaki; Keisei Sakiyama; Yusei Sakiyama; Rikito Shimada; Kentaro Yamauchi; Fumiya Yoshimura	Kazakhstan; Didar Amirali; Dias Anarbekov; Nurkanat Azhikanov; Abilmansur Batyrgali; Aidos Mukhat; Nikita Tarnakin; Dias Ulbek; Daniyar Yuldashev	Jordan; Zaki Abu Qaoud; Mohammad Al-Jafari; Abdelrahman Al-Masatfa; Saifaddeen Bani Fares; Afeef Ghaith; Abdallah Hammad; Omar Shaqrah
Team kumite	Japan; Yosuke Abe; Kyo Hirata; Yugo Kozaki; Keisei Sakiyama; Yusei Sakiyama; Rikito Shimada; Kentaro Yamauchi; Fumiya Yoshimura	Kazakhstan; Didar Amirali; Dias Anarbekov; Nurkanat Azhikanov; Abilmansur Batyrgali; Aidos Mukhat; Nikita Tarnakin; Dias Ulbek; Daniyar Yuldashev	Iran; Saleh Abazari; Bahman Asgari; Mehdi Ashouri; Mehdi Ganjzadeh; Alireza Heidari; Mehdi Khodabakhshi; Mahmoud Nemati; Morteza Nemati

=== Women ===
Event	Gold	Silver	Bronze
Individual kata	Grace Lau; Hong Kong	Maho Ono; Japan	Sakura Alforte; Philippines
Individual kata	Grace Lau; Hong Kong	Maho Ono; Japan	Fatemeh Sadeghi; Iran
Team kata	Japan; Saori Ishibashi; Chiho Mizukami; Sae Taira	Vietnam; Bùi Ngọc Nhi; Lưu Thị Thu Uyên; Nguyễn Ngọc Trâm; Nguyễn Thị Phương	China; Liao Yilin; Tao Yiwei; Xia Tingting; Ye Zhenyu
Team kata	Japan; Saori Ishibashi; Chiho Mizukami; Sae Taira	Vietnam; Bùi Ngọc Nhi; Lưu Thị Thu Uyên; Nguyễn Ngọc Trâm; Nguyễn Thị Phương	Iran; Sepideh Amini; Melika Ezzati; Zeinab Hosseini
Kumite −50 kg	Gulshan Alimardanova; Uzbekistan	Hsiao Yun-chen; Chinese Taipei	Shahmalarani Chandran; Malaysia
Kumite −50 kg	Gulshan Alimardanova; Uzbekistan	Hsiao Yun-chen; Chinese Taipei	Wang Junhui; China
Kumite −55 kg	Hoàng Thị Mỹ Tâm; Vietnam	Wei Yuchun; China	Taravat Khaksar; Iran
Kumite −55 kg	Hoàng Thị Mỹ Tâm; Vietnam	Wei Yuchun; China	Choi Wan Yu; Hong Kong
Kumite −61 kg	Gong Li; China	Assel Kanay; Kazakhstan	Sarara Shimada; Japan
Kumite −61 kg	Gong Li; China	Assel Kanay; Kazakhstan	Atousa Golshadnejad; Iran
Kumite −68 kg	Wong Cheuk Lee; Hong Kong	Fatma Khasaif; United Arab Emirates	Mobina Heidari; Iran
Kumite −68 kg	Wong Cheuk Lee; Hong Kong	Fatma Khasaif; United Arab Emirates	Joud Al-Drous; Jordan
Kumite +68 kg	Nguyễn Thị Ngoan; Vietnam	Arika Gurung; Nepal	Sumire Sugita; Japan
Kumite +68 kg	Nguyễn Thị Ngoan; Vietnam	Arika Gurung; Nepal	Sofya Berultseva; Kazakhstan
Team kumite	Vietnam; Đinh Thị Hương; Hoàng Thị Mỹ Tâm; Nguyễn Thị Diệu Ly; Nguyễn Thị Ngoan	China; Gong Li; Li Qiaoqiao; Wang Chenling; Wei Yuchun	Japan; Tsubasa Kama; Kanna Nagai; Yuzuki Sawae; Sarara Shimada; Sumire Sugita
Team kumite	Vietnam; Đinh Thị Hương; Hoàng Thị Mỹ Tâm; Nguyễn Thị Diệu Ly; Nguyễn Thị Ngoan	China; Gong Li; Li Qiaoqiao; Wang Chenling; Wei Yuchun	Chinese Taipei; Chen Tzu-yun; Huang Yu-ru; Ku Tsui-ping; Pao Yu-hsun

== Medal table ==
Rank	Nation	Gold	Silver	Bronze	Total
1	Japan	5	3	3	11
2	Vietnam	3	2	1	6
3	Kazakhstan	2	2	1	5
4	Hong Kong	2	0	2	4
5	China	1	2	2	5
6	Iran	1	1	9	11
7	Jordan	1	1	3	5
8	Kuwait	1	1	2	4
9	Uzbekistan	1	1	0	2
10	Chinese Taipei	0	1	2	3
11	Thailand	0	1	1	2
12	Nepal	0	1	0	1
12	United Arab Emirates	0	1	0	1
14	Saudi Arabia	0	0	3	3
15	Philippines	0	0	2	2
16	Iraq	0	0	1	1
16	Malaysia	0	0	1	1
16	Turkmenistan	0	0	1	1
Totals (18 entries)		17	17	34	68
