= 2023 Asian Karate Championships =

- Host city: Malacca, Malaysia
- Dates: 21–23 July 2023
- Main venue: Melaka International Trade Centre

The 2023 Asian Karate Championships were the 19th edition of the Senior Asian Karate Championship and were held in Malacca, Malaysia from 21 to 23, July 2023. The event was held at the Malacca International Trade Centre.

== Medalists ==
=== Men ===
Event	Gold	Silver	Bronze
Individual kata	Kakeru Nishiyama; Japan	Mohammad Bader; Kuwait	Park Hee-jun; South Korea
Individual kata	Kakeru Nishiyama; Japan	Mohammad Bader; Kuwait	Abolfazl Shahrjerdi; Iran
Team kata	Japan; Koji Arimoto; Kazumasa Moto; Ryuji Moto	Kuwait; Mohammad Al-Mosawi; Salman Al-Mosawi; Mohammad Bader	Vietnam; Giang Việt Anh; Lê Hồng Phúc; Phạm Minh Đức; Phạm Minh Quân
Team kata	Japan; Koji Arimoto; Kazumasa Moto; Ryuji Moto	Kuwait; Mohammad Al-Mosawi; Salman Al-Mosawi; Mohammad Bader	Iran; Milad Farazmehr; Abolfazl Shahrjerdi; Ali Zand
Kumite −55 kg	Behnam Dehghanzadeh; Iran	Omar Shaqrah; Jordan	Prem Kumar Selvam; Malaysia
Kumite −55 kg	Behnam Dehghanzadeh; Iran	Omar Shaqrah; Jordan	Zholaman Bigabyl; Kazakhstan
Kumite −60 kg	Kaisar Alpysbay; Kazakhstan	Shi Leilei; China	Siwakon Muekthong; Thailand
Kumite −60 kg	Kaisar Alpysbay; Kazakhstan	Shi Leilei; China	Abdallah Hammad; Jordan
Kumite −67 kg	Abdelrahman Al-Masatfa; Jordan	Didar Amirali; Kazakhstan	Amir Mehdizadeh; Iran
Kumite −67 kg	Abdelrahman Al-Masatfa; Jordan	Didar Amirali; Kazakhstan	Cheng Hui Pan; Hong Kong
Kumite −75 kg	Nurkanat Azhikanov; Kazakhstan	Bahman Asgari; Iran	Sultan Al-Zahrani; Saudi Arabia
Kumite −75 kg	Nurkanat Azhikanov; Kazakhstan	Bahman Asgari; Iran	Omar Al-Jenaei; Kuwait
Kumite −84 kg	Mohammad Al-Jafari; Jordan	Rikito Shimada; Japan	Daniyar Yuldashev; Kazakhstan
Kumite −84 kg	Mohammad Al-Jafari; Jordan	Rikito Shimada; Japan	Wu Chun-wei; Chinese Taipei
Kumite +84 kg	Tareg Hamedi; Saudi Arabia	Daiki Ando; Japan	Sajjad Ganjzadeh; Iran
Kumite +84 kg	Tareg Hamedi; Saudi Arabia	Daiki Ando; Japan	Abylay Toltay; Kazakhstan
Team kumite	Iran; Saleh Abazari; Mehdi Ashouri; Saman Edalati; Amir Hossein Fadakar; Mehdi Khodabakhshi; Mahmoud Nemati; Mehdi Shahgol	Kazakhstan; Dias Anarbekov; Abilmansur Batyrgali; Damir Nurbergen; Nikita Tarnakin; Dias Ulbek; Nurniyaz Yeldashov; Daniyar Yuldashev	Kuwait; Omar Al-Jenaei; Fahed Al-Ajmi; Ahmad Al-Mesfer; Mohammad Al-Mijadi; Soltaan Al-Mutairi; Yousef Mohammad; Abdulaziz Shaaban
Team kumite	Iran; Saleh Abazari; Mehdi Ashouri; Saman Edalati; Amir Hossein Fadakar; Mehdi Khodabakhshi; Mahmoud Nemati; Mehdi Shahgol	Kazakhstan; Dias Anarbekov; Abilmansur Batyrgali; Damir Nurbergen; Nikita Tarnakin; Dias Ulbek; Nurniyaz Yeldashov; Daniyar Yuldashev	Jordan; Mohammad Al-Jafari; Abdelrahman Al-Masatfa; Afeef Ghaith; Abdallah Hammad; Hasan Masarweh; Ahmad Shadid; Omar Shaqrah

=== Women ===
Event	Gold	Silver	Bronze
Individual kata	Grace Lau; Hong Kong	Kiyou Shimizu; Japan	Liya Koshkarbayeva; Kazakhstan
Individual kata	Grace Lau; Hong Kong	Kiyou Shimizu; Japan	Fatemeh Sadeghi; Iran
Team kata	Japan; Saori Ishibashi; Chiho Mizukami; Sae Taira	Vietnam; Lê Thị Khánh Ly; Lưu Thị Thu Uyên; Nguyễn Ngọc Trâm; Nguyễn Thị Phương	Malaysia; Naccy Nelly Evvaferra; Lovelly Anne Robberth; Niathalia Sherawinnie
Team kata	Japan; Saori Ishibashi; Chiho Mizukami; Sae Taira	Vietnam; Lê Thị Khánh Ly; Lưu Thị Thu Uyên; Nguyễn Ngọc Trâm; Nguyễn Thị Phương	Indonesia; Magfirah Syamsul Alam; Nadya Baharuddin; Nur Rizka Fauziah
Kumite −50 kg	Tsang Yee Ting; Hong Kong	Moldir Zhangbyrbay; Kazakhstan	Hawraa Al-Ajmi; United Arab Emirates
Kumite −50 kg	Tsang Yee Ting; Hong Kong	Moldir Zhangbyrbay; Kazakhstan	Sara Bahmanyar; Iran
Kumite −55 kg	Ku Tsui-ping; Chinese Taipei	Gulmira Ussenova; Kazakhstan	Fatemeh Saadati; Iran
Kumite −55 kg	Ku Tsui-ping; Chinese Taipei	Gulmira Ussenova; Kazakhstan	Rina Kodo; Japan
Kumite −61 kg	Atousa Golshadnejad; Iran	Sarah Al-Ameri; United Arab Emirates	Zakiah Adnan; Malaysia
Kumite −61 kg	Atousa Golshadnejad; Iran	Sarah Al-Ameri; United Arab Emirates	Gong Li; China
Kumite −68 kg	Ceyco Georgia Zefanya; Indonesia	Li Qiaoqiao; China	Kanna Nagai; Japan
Kumite −68 kg	Ceyco Georgia Zefanya; Indonesia	Li Qiaoqiao; China	Joud Al-Drous; Jordan
Kumite +68 kg	Sofya Berultseva; Kazakhstan	Văng Thị Ngọc Mỹ; Vietnam	Yu Yan-yi; Chinese Taipei
Kumite +68 kg	Sofya Berultseva; Kazakhstan	Văng Thị Ngọc Mỹ; Vietnam	Dessyinta Rakawuni Banurea; Indonesia
Team kumite	Vietnam; Đinh Thị Hương; Hoàng Thị Mỹ Tâm; Nguyễn Thị Ngoan; Văng Thị Ngọc Mỹ	Iran; Leila Borjali; Atousa Golshadnejad; Mobina Heidari; Mobina Kaviani	China; Ding Jiamei; Gong Li; Li Qiaoqiao; Xu Qiqi
Team kumite	Vietnam; Đinh Thị Hương; Hoàng Thị Mỹ Tâm; Nguyễn Thị Ngoan; Văng Thị Ngọc Mỹ	Iran; Leila Borjali; Atousa Golshadnejad; Mobina Heidari; Mobina Kaviani	Chinese Taipei; Chao Jou; Chen Tzu-yun; Ku Tsui-ping; Yu Yan-yi

== Medal table ==
Rank	Nation	Gold	Silver	Bronze	Total
1	Kazakhstan	3	4	4	11
2	Japan	3	3	2	8
3	Iran	3	2	7	12
4	Jordan	2	1	3	6
5	Hong Kong	2	0	1	3
6	Vietnam	1	2	1	4
7	Chinese Taipei	1	0	3	4
8	Indonesia	1	0	2	3
9	Saudi Arabia	1	0	1	2
10	China	0	2	2	4
10	Kuwait	0	2	2	4
12	United Arab Emirates	0	1	1	2
13	Malaysia	0	0	3	3
14	South Korea	0	0	1	1
14	Thailand	0	0	1	1
Totals (15 entries)		17	17	34	68
