= 2025 Asian Karate Championships =

- Host city: Tashkent, Uzbekistan
- Dates: 23–25 May 2025
- Main venue: Yunusobod Sport Complex

The 2025 Asian Karate Championships were the 21st edition of the Senior Asian Karate Championship and were held in Tashkent, Uzbekistan from 23 to 25 May 2025.

== Medalists ==
=== Men ===
Event	Gold	Silver	Bronze
Individual kata	Kakeru Nishiyama; Japan	Salman Al-Mosawi; Kuwait	Christopher Edbert; Indonesia
Individual kata	Kakeru Nishiyama; Japan	Salman Al-Mosawi; Kuwait	Chen Chao-ching; Chinese Taipei
Team kata	Japan; Ryonosuke Kikuchi; Ishin Kitazawa; Ken Okamoto	Kuwait; Saqr Al-Dbasi; Mohammad Al-Mosawi; Salman Al-Mosawi; Mohammad Bader	Iran; Milad Farazmehr; Abolfazl Shahrjerdi; Ali Zand
Team kata	Japan; Ryonosuke Kikuchi; Ishin Kitazawa; Ken Okamoto	Kuwait; Saqr Al-Dbasi; Mohammad Al-Mosawi; Salman Al-Mosawi; Mohammad Bader	Hong Kong; Chiu Chun Yin; Li Chi Kong; Tang Yu Hin
Kumite −55 kg	Zholaman Bigabyl; Kazakhstan	Sobitxon Qosimov; Uzbekistan	Abdelrahman Haimour; Jordan
Kumite −55 kg	Zholaman Bigabyl; Kazakhstan	Sobitxon Qosimov; Uzbekistan	Thevendran Kaliana Sundram; Malaysia
Kumite −60 kg	Siwakon Muekthong; Thailand	Hiromu Hashimoto; Japan	Abdullah Shaaban; Kuwait
Kumite −60 kg	Siwakon Muekthong; Thailand	Hiromu Hashimoto; Japan	Bekzhan Kalykov; Kyrgyzstan
Kumite −67 kg	Yugo Kozaki; Japan	Mohammed Al-Assiri; Saudi Arabia	Shih Cheng-chung; Chinese Taipei
Kumite −67 kg	Yugo Kozaki; Japan	Mohammed Al-Assiri; Saudi Arabia	Abdul Vakhkhob Rashidov; Uzbekistan
Kumite −75 kg	Nurkanat Azhikanov; Kazakhstan	Morteza Nemati; Iran	Kuvonchbek Mukhammadiev; Uzbekistan
Kumite −75 kg	Nurkanat Azhikanov; Kazakhstan	Morteza Nemati; Iran	Saeed Al-Najjar; Jordan
Kumite −84 kg	Mohammad Al-Jafari; Jordan	Rikito Shimada; Japan	Daniyar Yuldashev; Kazakhstan
Kumite −84 kg	Mohammad Al-Jafari; Jordan	Rikito Shimada; Japan	Pan Che-en; Chinese Taipei
Kumite +84 kg	Sanad Sufyani; Saudi Arabia	Teerawat Kangtong; Thailand	Fumiya Yoshimura; Japan
Kumite +84 kg	Sanad Sufyani; Saudi Arabia	Teerawat Kangtong; Thailand	Dias Ulbek; Kazakhstan
Team kumite	Jordan; Mohammad Al-Jafari; Ameen Al-Maghrabi; Abdelrahman Al-Masatfa; Saeed Al-Najjar; Afeef Ghaith; Abdallah Hammad; Ahmad Shadid	Iran; Saleh Abazari; Mehdi Ashouri; Esmaeil Motamedi; Mahmoud Nemati; Morteza Nemati; Ali Rahimi; Mohsen Safarnejad	Kazakhstan; Didar Amirali; Galym Assylkhan; Nurkanat Azhikanov; Abilmansur Batyrgali; Shynggys Tailiyev; Nikita Tarnakin; Daniyar Yuldashev
Team kumite	Jordan; Mohammad Al-Jafari; Ameen Al-Maghrabi; Abdelrahman Al-Masatfa; Saeed Al-Najjar; Afeef Ghaith; Abdallah Hammad; Ahmad Shadid	Iran; Saleh Abazari; Mehdi Ashouri; Esmaeil Motamedi; Mahmoud Nemati; Morteza Nemati; Ali Rahimi; Mohsen Safarnejad	Japan; Yugo Kozaki; Keisei Sakiyama; Yusei Sakiyama; Rikito Shimada; Haruya Toyoda; Kentaro Yamauchi; Fumiya Yoshimura

=== Women ===
Event	Gold	Silver	Bronze
Individual kata	Grace Lau; Hong Kong	Maho Ono; Japan	Tao Yiwei; China
Individual kata	Grace Lau; Hong Kong	Maho Ono; Japan	Nguyễn Ngọc Trâm; Vietnam
Team kata	Vietnam; Bùi Ngọc Nhi; Hoàng Thị Thu Uyên; Nguyễn Ngọc Trâm; Nguyễn Thị Phương	China; Liao Yilin; Tao Yiwei; Xia Tingting; Ye Zhenyu	Chinese Taipei; Chien Hui-hsuan; Chung Yun-yun; Hung Chih-hsuan; Tien Hsin-erh
Team kata	Vietnam; Bùi Ngọc Nhi; Hoàng Thị Thu Uyên; Nguyễn Ngọc Trâm; Nguyễn Thị Phương	China; Liao Yilin; Tao Yiwei; Xia Tingting; Ye Zhenyu	Hong Kong; Ma Ka Man; Tam Cheuk Yi; Tung Yee Yin; Wong Sze Man
Kumite −50 kg	Gulshan Alimardanova; Uzbekistan	Shahmalarani Chandran; Malaysia	Sara Bahmanyar; Iran
Kumite −50 kg	Gulshan Alimardanova; Uzbekistan	Shahmalarani Chandran; Malaysia	Moldir Zhangbyrbay; Kazakhstan
Kumite −55 kg	Hoàng Thị Mỹ Tâm; Vietnam	Fatemeh Saadati; Iran	Wei Yuchun; China
Kumite −55 kg	Hoàng Thị Mỹ Tâm; Vietnam	Fatemeh Saadati; Iran	Alisha Choudhary; India
Kumite −61 kg	Atousa Golshadnejad; Iran	Sevinch Otaboeva; Uzbekistan	Sarara Shimada; Japan
Kumite −61 kg	Atousa Golshadnejad; Iran	Sevinch Otaboeva; Uzbekistan	Assel Kanay; Kazakhstan
Kumite −68 kg	Daiyana Darenskaya; Kazakhstan	Tsubasa Kama; Japan	Wong Cheuk Lee; Hong Kong
Kumite −68 kg	Daiyana Darenskaya; Kazakhstan	Tsubasa Kama; Japan	Bhuvaneshwari Jadhav; India
Kumite +68 kg	Sofya Berultseva; Kazakhstan	Sumire Sugita; Japan	Yara Naser; Jordan
Kumite +68 kg	Sofya Berultseva; Kazakhstan	Sumire Sugita; Japan	Mokhlaroyim Khakimjonova; Uzbekistan
Team kumite	Vietnam; Đinh Thị Hương; Hoàng Thị Mỹ Tâm; Nguyễn Thị Diệu Ly; Nguyễn Thị Ngoan	Kazakhstan; Sofya Berultseva; Daiyana Darenskaya; Assel Kanay; Nuriya Tizimbay; Nikol Tsengel	Iran; Sara Bahmanyar; Atousa Golshadnejad; Mobina Kaviani; Masoumeh Mohsenian; Fatemeh Saadati
Team kumite	Vietnam; Đinh Thị Hương; Hoàng Thị Mỹ Tâm; Nguyễn Thị Diệu Ly; Nguyễn Thị Ngoan	Kazakhstan; Sofya Berultseva; Daiyana Darenskaya; Assel Kanay; Nuriya Tizimbay; Nikol Tsengel	Japan; Tsubasa Kama; Rina Kodo; Kanna Nagai; Sarara Shimada; Sumire Sugita

== Medal table ==
Rank	Nation	Gold	Silver	Bronze	Total
1	Kazakhstan	4	1	5	10
2	Japan	3	5	4	12
3	Vietnam	3	0	1	4
4	Jordan	2	0	3	5
5	Iran	1	3	3	7
6	Uzbekistan	1	2	3	6
7	Saudi Arabia	1	1	0	2
7	Thailand	1	1	0	2
9	Hong Kong	1	0	3	4
10	Kuwait	0	2	1	3
11	China	0	1	2	3
12	Malaysia	0	1	1	2
13	Chinese Taipei	0	0	4	4
14	India	0	0	2	2
15	Indonesia	0	0	1	1
15	Kyrgyzstan	0	0	1	1
Totals (16 entries)		17	17	34	68
