= Karate at the 2022 Asian Games – Men's team kata =

Karate competition

Men's team kata at the 2022 Asian Games
- Venue: Linping Sports Centre Gymnasium
- Date: 8 October 2023
- Competitors: 18 from 6 nations

Medalists
gold medal	Japan; Koji Arimoto, Kazumasa Moto, Ryuji Moto
silver medal	Macau; Cheang Pei Lok, Fong Man Hou, Kuok Kin Hang
bronze medal	Iraq; Pazhar Mahdi, Binar Mustafa, Yousif Salam
bronze medal	Kuwait; Mohammad Al-Mosawi, Salman Al-Mosawi, Mohammad Bader

The men's team kata event at the 2022 Asian Games took place on 8 October 2023 at Linping Sports Centre Gymnasium, Hangzhou, China.

== Schedule ==
All times are China Standard Time (UTC+08:00)

Date	Time	Event
Sunday, 8 October 2023	08:30	Round 1
Sunday, 8 October 2023	08:30	Finals

== Squads ==
Hong Kong	Iraq	Japan	Kuwait
Chris Cheng; Howard Hung; Tang Yu Hin	Pazhar Mahdi; Binar Mustafa; Yousif Salam	Koji Arimoto; Kazumasa Moto; Ryuji Moto	Mohammad Al-Mosawi; Salman Al-Mosawi; Mohammad Bader
Macau	Vietnam		
Cheang Pei Lok; Fong Man Hou; Kuok Kin Hang	Giang Việt Anh; Lê Hồng Phúc; Phạm Minh Đức		

== Results ==
=== Round 1 ===
==== Pool 1 ====
Rank	Team	Score
1	Macau (MAC)	42.2
2	Hong Kong (HKG)	40.7
3	Vietnam (VIE)	40.2

==== Pool 2 ====
Rank	Team	Score
1	Japan (JPN)	43.6
2	Kuwait (KUW)	42.4
3	Iraq (IRQ)	40.4

=== Medal contests ===
==== Bronze medal match 1 ====
Rank	Team	Score
1	Iraq (IRQ)	41.8
2	Hong Kong (HKG)	40.5

==== Bronze medal match 2 ====
Rank	Team	Score
1	Kuwait (KUW)	42.3
2	Vietnam (VIE)	40.7

==== Gold medal contest ====
Rank	Team	Score
1	Japan (JPN)	44.5
2	Macau (MAC)	41.7
