= Gulshan Alimardanova =

Uzbekistani karateka (born 2006)

Personal information
- Born: 19 January 2006 (age 20)

Sport
- Country: Uzbekistan
- Sport: Karate
- Weight class: 50 kg
- Event: Kumite
Medal record
Women's karate
Representing Uzbekistan
World Championships
Gold medal – first place	2025 Cairo	Kumite −50 kg
Asian Championships
Gold medal – first place	2024 Hangzhou	Kumite −50 kg
Gold medal – first place	2025 Tashkent	Kumite −50 kg
Islamic Solidarity Games
Silver medal – second place	2025 Riyadh	Kumite 50 kg
CIS Games
Gold medal – first place	2025 Ganja	Kumite −50 kg
BRICS Games
Silver medal – second place	2024 Kazan	Kumite −50 kg

Gulshan Alimadanova (born 19 January 2006) is an Uzbekistani karateka who specializes in kumite. She has won medals for her country at the BRICS Games, CIS Games, Islamic Solidarity Games, Asian and World Karate Championships.

== Career ==
In June 2024, Alimardanova competed in the BRICS Games and won the silver medal in the Kumite −50 kg event, losing to Yu Xie in the gold medal match. In September, she competed in the Asian Karate Championships and won the gold medal in the kumite −50 kg event, defeating Hsiao Yun-chen in the final.

In May 2025, Alimardanova competed in the Asian Karate Championships, where she won the gold medal, once again in the kumite −50 kg event, defeating Shahmalarani Chandran in the final. In October, she competed in the CIS Games and won the gold medal in her category. In November, Alimardanova competed in the Islamic Solidarity Games, losing to Sara Bahmanyar in the gold medal match. Later that month, she competed in the World Karate Championships, where she won the gold medal in the women's kumite 50 kg event. She defeated Shahmalarani in the gold medal match, becoming the first Uzbekistani woman to become world champion in kumite.
