= Karate at the 2026 Asian Games – Women's kumite 50 kg =

Women's kumite 50 kg at the 2026 Asian Games
- Venue: Toyohashi City General Gymnasium
- Date: 23 September 2026
- Competitors: 13 from 13 nations

Medalists
gold medal	Shahmalarani Chandran	Malaysia
silver medal	Tsang Yee Ting	Hong Kong
bronze medal	Fong Man Wai	Macau
bronze medal	Marie June Adriano	Philippines

The women's kumite 50 kilograms competition at the 2026 Asian Games took place on 23 September 2026 at Toyohashi City General Gymnasium, Toyohashi. Shahmalarani Chandran defeated Hong Kong's Tsang Yee Ting in the final to win the gold medal, with the bout finishing scoreless and the title decided by judges' decision (hantei).

== Schedule ==
All times are Japan Standard Time (UTC+09:00)

Date	Time	Event
Wednesday, 23 September 2026	11:55	Round of 16
Wednesday, 23 September 2026	11:55	Quarterfinals
Wednesday, 23 September 2026	11:55	Semifinals
Wednesday, 23 September 2026	11:55	Repechage
Wednesday, 23 September 2026	11:55	Bronze medal bouts
Wednesday, 23 September 2026	14:45	Final

== Results ==
=== Main bracket ===
Round of 16
Joud Myajan (KSA)	6
Chinzorigiin Enkhzayaa (MGL)	1
Gulshan Alimardanova (UZB)	5
Sirikamonnate Chokprasertgul (THA)	5
Shahmalarani Chandran (MAS)	8
Fong Man Wai (MAC)	0
Chung Ya-chi (TPE)	3
Salamh Al-Sultan (KUW)	1
Marie June Adriano (PHI)	4
Chonn Srey Phea (CAM)	3

Quarterfinals
Joud Myajan (KSA)	1
Gulshan Alimardanova (UZB)	10
Shahmalarani Chandran (MAS)	5
Saiama Jaman (BAN)	4
Chung Ya-chi (TPE)	0
Tsang Yee Ting (HKG)	6
Marie June Adriano (PHI)	4
Yang Ye-won (KOR)	0

Semifinals
Gulshan Alimardanova (UZB)	2
Shahmalarani Chandran (MAS)	3
Tsang Yee Ting (HKG)	5
Marie June Adriano (PHI)	4

Final
Shahmalarani Chandran (MAS)	0
Tsang Yee Ting (HKG)	0

=== Repechage ===
Repechage round 1
Fong Man Wai (MAC)	4
Saiama Jaman (BAN)	0

Bronze medal bouts
Fong Man Wai (MAC)	6
Gulshan Alimardanova (UZB)	5
Chung Ya-chi (TPE)	3
Marie June Adriano (PHI)	10
