= 2026 Asian Karate Championships =

- Host city: Bali, Indonesia
- Dates: 18–21 June 2026
- Main venue: Bali Nusa Dua Convention Center

The 2026 Asian Karate Championships were the 22nd edition of the Senior Asian Karate Championship and were held at the Nusa Dua Convention Center, Bali, Indonesia from 18 to 21 June 2026.

== Medalists ==
=== Men ===
Event	Gold	Silver	Bronze
Individual kata	Kakeru Nishiyama; Japan	Salman Al-Mosawi; Kuwait	Ali Zand; Iran
Individual kata	Kakeru Nishiyama; Japan	Salman Al-Mosawi; Kuwait	Haznil Henry; Malaysia
Team kata	Japan; Ryonosuke Kikuchi; Ishin Kitazawa; Ken Okamoto	Kuwait; Saqr Al-Dbasi; Mohammad Al-Mosawi; Salman Al-Mosawi; Mohammad Bader	Chinese Taipei; Chang Yun-hsiang; Li Hsiang-hsuan; Tu Cheng-han
Team kata	Japan; Ryonosuke Kikuchi; Ishin Kitazawa; Ken Okamoto	Kuwait; Saqr Al-Dbasi; Mohammad Al-Mosawi; Salman Al-Mosawi; Mohammad Bader	Vietnam; Giang Việt Anh; Lê Nguyễn Thái Hưng; Phạm Minh Đức; Phạm Trường Giang
Kumite −55 kg	Zholaman Bigabyl; Kazakhstan	Sultan Musayri; Saudi Arabia	Đỗ Duy Khánh; Vietnam
Kumite −55 kg	Zholaman Bigabyl; Kazakhstan	Sultan Musayri; Saudi Arabia	Natthakrit Ingloy; Thailand
Kumite −60 kg	Saud Al-Basher; Saudi Arabia	Abdelrahman Abdelhamid; Qatar	Mekhriddin Turakhonov; Uzbekistan
Kumite −60 kg	Saud Al-Basher; Saudi Arabia	Abdelrahman Abdelhamid; Qatar	Siwakon Muekthong; Thailand
Kumite −67 kg	Olzhas Altynbek; Kazakhstan	Abdelrahman Al-Masatfa; Jordan	Mohammed Al-Assiri; Saudi Arabia
Kumite −67 kg	Olzhas Altynbek; Kazakhstan	Abdelrahman Al-Masatfa; Jordan	Yugo Kozaki; Japan
Kumite −75 kg	Morteza Nemati; Iran	Nurkanat Azhikanov; Kazakhstan	Yusei Sakiyama; Japan
Kumite −75 kg	Morteza Nemati; Iran	Nurkanat Azhikanov; Kazakhstan	An Gwang-min; South Korea
Kumite −84 kg	Mohammad Al-Jafari; Jordan	Reda Messaoudi; United Arab Emirates	Nikita Tarnakin; Kazakhstan
Kumite −84 kg	Mohammad Al-Jafari; Jordan	Reda Messaoudi; United Arab Emirates	Ali Asghar Asiabari; Iran
Kumite +84 kg	Mahmoud Nemati; Iran	Sanad Sufyani; Saudi Arabia	Daniel Hutapea; Indonesia
Kumite +84 kg	Mahmoud Nemati; Iran	Sanad Sufyani; Saudi Arabia	Kentaro Yamauchi; Japan
Team kumite	Jordan; Mohammad Al-Jafari; Abdelrahman Al-Masatfa; Saeed Al-Najjar; Afeef Ghaith; Abdelrahman Haimour; Abdallah Hammad; Waleed Qatamish	Iran; Saleh Abazari; Bahman Asgari; Mehdi Ashouri; Ali Asghar Asiabari; Esmaeil Motamedi; Morteza Nemati; Mehdi Shahgol	Japan; Yosuke Abe; Yuta Mori; Keisei Sakiyama; Yusei Sakiyama; Rikito Shimada; Haruya Toyoda; Kentaro Yamauchi
Team kumite	Jordan; Mohammad Al-Jafari; Abdelrahman Al-Masatfa; Saeed Al-Najjar; Afeef Ghaith; Abdelrahman Haimour; Abdallah Hammad; Waleed Qatamish	Iran; Saleh Abazari; Bahman Asgari; Mehdi Ashouri; Ali Asghar Asiabari; Esmaeil Motamedi; Morteza Nemati; Mehdi Shahgol	Uzbekistan; Mukhammad Fayzulloev; Islombek Ismatullayev; Mamayusuf Mukimjonov; Dilshodbek Nuraliev; Abdul Vakhkhob Rashidov; Abdurasul Sulaymonov; Jakhongir Ziyatov

=== Women ===
Event	Gold	Silver	Bronze
Individual kata	Maho Ono; Japan	Grace Lau; Hong Kong	Fatemeh Sadeghi; Iran
Individual kata	Maho Ono; Japan	Grace Lau; Hong Kong	Sakura Alforte; Philippines
Team kata	Japan; Misuzu Kobayashi; Saki Okamoto; Kotomi Sato	China; Liao Yilin; Tao Yiwei; Ye Zhenyu	Chinese Taipei; Chien Hui-hsuan; Chung Yun-yun; Hung Chih-hsuan; Tien Hsin-erh
Team kata	Japan; Misuzu Kobayashi; Saki Okamoto; Kotomi Sato	China; Liao Yilin; Tao Yiwei; Ye Zhenyu	Iran; Sepideh Amini; Zeinab Hosseini; Fatemeh Sadeghi
Kumite −50 kg	Tsang Yee Ting; Hong Kong	Wang Junhui; China	Chung Ya-chi; Chinese Taipei
Kumite −50 kg	Tsang Yee Ting; Hong Kong	Wang Junhui; China	Nguyễn Thị Thu; Vietnam
Kumite −55 kg	Alisha Choudhary; India	Rina Kodo; Japan	Hoàng Thị Mỹ Tâm; Vietnam
Kumite −55 kg	Alisha Choudhary; India	Rina Kodo; Japan	Bella Samasheva; Kazakhstan
Kumite −61 kg	Sarara Shimada; Japan	Assel Kanay; Kazakhstan	Gong Li; China
Kumite −61 kg	Sarara Shimada; Japan	Assel Kanay; Kazakhstan	Mehrnegar Ahmadi; Iran
Kumite −68 kg	Nguyễn Thị Diệu Ly; Vietnam	Tsubasa Kama; Japan	Daiyana Darenskaya; Kazakhstan
Kumite −68 kg	Nguyễn Thị Diệu Ly; Vietnam	Tsubasa Kama; Japan	Li Qiaoqiao; China
Kumite +68 kg	Leica Al Humaira Lubis; Indonesia	Yara Naser; Jordan	Yuzuki Kataoka; Japan
Kumite +68 kg	Leica Al Humaira Lubis; Indonesia	Yara Naser; Jordan	Arika Gurung; Nepal
Team kumite	Iran; Sara Bahmanyar; Mobina Heidari; Fatemeh Zahra Saeidabadi; Hannaneh Salehi	Japan; Tsubasa Kama; Rina Kodo; Kanna Nagai; Sarara Shimada	Indonesia; Leica Al Humaira Lubis; Almahyra Tiara Sandi; Cok Istri Agung Sanistyarani; Ceyco Georgia Zefanya
Team kumite	Iran; Sara Bahmanyar; Mobina Heidari; Fatemeh Zahra Saeidabadi; Hannaneh Salehi	Japan; Tsubasa Kama; Rina Kodo; Kanna Nagai; Sarara Shimada	Vietnam; Đinh Thị Hương; Hoàng Thị Mỹ Tâm; Nguyễn Thị Diệu Ly; Nguyễn Thị Thu

== Medal table ==
Rank	Nation	Gold	Silver	Bronze	Total
1	Japan	5	3	5	13
2	Iran	3	1	5	9
3	Kazakhstan	2	2	3	7
4	Jordan	2	2	0	4
5	Saudi Arabia	1	2	1	4
6	Hong Kong	1	1	0	2
7	Vietnam	1	0	5	6
8	Indonesia	1	0	2	3
9	India	1	0	0	1
10	China	0	2	2	4
11	Kuwait	0	2	0	2
12	Qatar	0	1	0	1
12	United Arab Emirates	0	1	0	1
14	Chinese Taipei	0	0	3	3
15	Thailand	0	0	2	2
15	Uzbekistan	0	0	2	2
17	Malaysia	0	0	1	1
17	Nepal	0	0	1	1
17	Philippines	0	0	1	1
17	South Korea	0	0	1	1
Totals (20 entries)		17	17	34	68
