= Fatemeh Sadeghi =

Iranian karateka (born 1999)

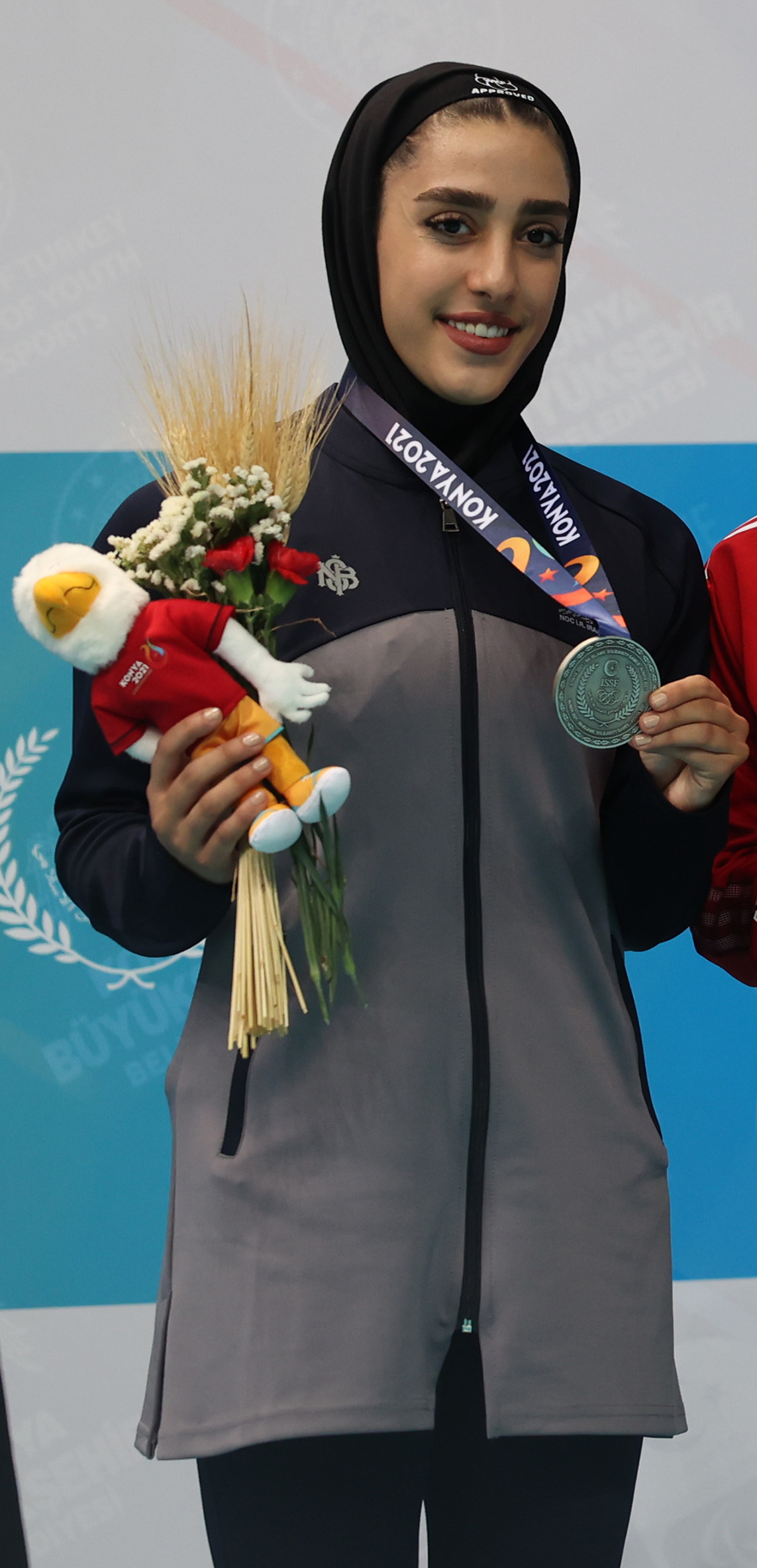

Personal information
- Full name: Fatemeh Sadeghi Dastak
- Born: 19 October 1999 (age 27)

Sport
- Country: Iranian
- Sport: Karate
- Event: Individual kata
Medal record
Women's karate
Representing Iran
Asian Games
Silver medal – second place	2026 Aichi–Nagoya	Team kata
Islamic Solidarity Games
Gold medal – first place	2025 Riyadh	Individual kata
Silver medal – second place	2021 Konya	Individual kata
World Beach Games
Silver medal – second place	2019 Doha	Individual kata
Asian Championships
Bronze medal – third place	2019 Tashkent	Individual kata
Bronze medal – third place	2022 Tashkent	Individual kata
Bronze medal – third place	2023 Malacca	Individual kata
Bronze medal – third place	2024 Hangzhou	Individual kata
Bronze medal – third place	2026 Bali	Individual kata
Bronze medal – third place	2026 Bali	Team kata

Fateme Sadeghi Dastak (Persian: فاطمه صادقی دستک; born 19 October 1999) is an Iranian karate athlete. She won the silver medal in the women's individual kata event at the 2019 World Beach Games held in Doha, Qatar. She won the silver medal in the women's individual kata event at the 2021 Islamic Solidarity Games held in Konya, Turkey.

At the 2019 Asian Karate Championships held in Tashkent, Uzbekistan, she won one of the bronze medals in the women's individual kata event.

In 2021, she competed at the World Olympic Qualification Tournament held in Paris, France hoping to qualify for the 2020 Summer Olympics in Tokyo, Japan.

She won one of the bronze medals in her event at the 2022 Asian Karate Championships held in Tashkent, Uzbekistan. She also won one of the bronze medals in her event at the 2023 Asian Karate Championships held in Malacca, Malaysia.

== Achievements ==
Year	Competition	Venue	Rank	Event
2019	Asian Championships	Tashkent, Uzbekistan	3rd	Individual kata
2019	World Beach Games	Doha, Qatar	2nd	Individual kata
2022	Islamic Solidarity Games	Konya, Turkey	2nd	Individual kata
2022	Asian Championships	Tashkent, Uzbekistan	3rd	Individual kata
2023	Asian Championships	Malacca, Malaysia	3rd	Individual kata
