= 2021 World Karate Championships – Women's team kata =

World Karate Championship

Women's team kata at the 2021 World Karate Championships
- Venue: Hamdan Sports Complex
- Location: Dubai, United Arab Emirates
- Dates: 19–21 November
- Competitors: 57 from 19 nations
- Teams: 19

Medalists
| gold medal | Saori Ishibashi; Sae Taira; Misaki Yabumoto | Japan |
| silver medal | María López; Lidia Rodríguez; Raquel Roy | Spain |
| bronze medal | Noha Amr Antar; Aya Hesham; Asmaa Mahmoud | Egypt |
| bronze medal | Carola Casale; Terryana D'Onofrio; Michela Pezzetti | Italy |

The women's team kata competition at the 2021 World Karate Championships was held from 19 to 21 November 2021.

== Results ==
=== Round 1 ===
| Rank | Pool 1 | | Pool 2 | |
| Rank | Team | Total | Team | Total |
|---|---|---|---|---|
| 1 | Spain | 25.84 | Japan | 25.76 |
| 2 | Egypt | 25.04 | Italy | 25.40 |
| 3 | Peru | 23.92 | Portugal | 24.54 |
| 4 | Turkey | 23.40 | Germany | 24.40 |
| 5 | RKF | 22.92 | France | 24.34 |
| 6 | Hong Kong | 22.56 | England | 23.54 |
| 7 | Brazil | 22.28 | Algeria | 23.52 |
| 8 | Slovakia | 21.60 | Mexico | 23.38 |
| 9 | Kuwait | 19.46 | Hungary | 23.24 |
| 10 | Croatia | DNS | United Arab Emirates | 20.42 |

=== Round 2 ===
| Rank | Pool 1 | | Pool 2 | |
| Rank | Team | Total | Team | Total |
|---|---|---|---|---|
| 1 | Spain | 26.26 | Japan | 26.28 |
| 2 | Egypt | 25.60 | Italy | 25.88 |
| 3 | Peru | 24.28 | Portugal | 24.60 |
| 4 | Turkey | 23.72 | Germany | 23.34 |

=== Finals ===
| Final |
| Spain | 26.00 |
| Japan | 27.26 |

Bronze medal
Egypt | 25.72
Portugal | 24.88
Peru | 24.74
Italy | 26.14
