= Alisha Choudhary =

Indian karateka

Personal information
- Born: Mohna, Haryana, India

Sport
- Sport: Karate
- Weight class: –55 kg
- Event: Kumite
Medal record
Women's kumite
Representing India
Asian Championships
Gold medal – first place	2026 Bali	−55kg
Bronze medal – third place	2025 Tashkent	−55kg

Alisha Choudhary is an Indian karateka who competes in the women's kumite −55 kg category. She won the gold medal at the 2026 Asian Championships and the bronze medal at the 2025 Asian Championships.

== Early life ==
Alisha was born in Mohna village in Kaithal district of Haryana. She was raised in a family with an agricultural background. Her father, Jasmer, is a farmer, while her mother, Santosh, is a homemaker. She spent her early years in Mohna, where she developed an interest in sports before pursuing karate competitively.

== Career ==
Alisha won the bronze medal in the women's kumite −55 kg event at the 2025 Asian Championships in Tashkent, Uzbekistan.

In January 2026, she won the bronze medal in the women's kumite −55 kg event at the Karate 1 Series A tournament in Tbilisi, Georgia, becoming the first Indian woman to win a medal at a Karate 1 Series A event. In June 2026, Alisha won the gold medal in the women's kumite −55 kg event at the 2026 Asian Championships in Bali, Indonesia, defeating Japan's Rina Kodo in the final. She became the first Indian woman to win a gold medal at the Senior Asian Karate Championships. She is selected to represent India at the 2026 Asian Games.
