= 2024 Karate1 Premier League =

The Karate 1 – Premier League 2024 is a series of international karate competitions organized by the World Karate Federation (WKF) during the year 2024. The series consists of multiple stages held in different countries as part of the Premier League circuit and brings together the world's top karate athletes competing in both kata and kumite disciplines.

== Events ==
Karate 1 – Premier League 2024
Stages	Date	Series	City	Country
1	26–28 January 2024	Premier League – Paris	Paris	France
2	15–17 March 2024	Premier League – Antalya	Antalya	Turkey
3	19–21 April 2024	Premier League – Cairo	Cairo	Egypt
4	31 May – 2 June 2024	Premier League – Casablanca	Casablanca	Morocco

== Karate1 Premier League - Paris 2024 ==
The Karate 1 Premier League – Paris 2024 was held from 26 to 28 January 2024 in Paris, France.

=== Men ===
Event	Gold	Silver	Bronze
Individual kata	Kakeru Nishiyama; Japan	Ryuji Moto; Japan	Ariel Torres Gutierrez; United States
Individual kata	Kakeru Nishiyama; Japan	Ryuji Moto; Japan	Ali Sofuoglu; Turkey
Kumite -60 kg	Eray Samdan; Turkey	Hiromu Hashimoto; Japan	Ali Meskini; Iran
Kumite -60 kg	Eray Samdan; Turkey	Hiromu Hashimoto; Japan	Christos-Stefanos Xenos; Greece
Kumite -67 kg	Said Oubaya; Morocco	Luca Maresca; Italy	Ali Elsawy; Egypt
Kumite -67 kg	Said Oubaya; Morocco	Luca Maresca; Italy	Afeef Ghaith; Jordan
Kumite -75 kg	Abdalla Abdelaziz; Egypt	Enes Bulut; Turkey	Kilian Cizo; France
Kumite -75 kg	Abdalla Abdelaziz; Egypt	Enes Bulut; Turkey	Jaeyoon Pi; South Korea
Kumite -84 kg	Valerii Chobotar; Ukraine	Konstantinos Mastrogiannis; Greece	Brian Timmermans; Netherlands
Kumite -84 kg	Valerii Chobotar; Ukraine	Konstantinos Mastrogiannis; Greece	Youssef Badawy; Egypt
Kumite 84+ kg	Tarek Taha Mahmoud; Egypt	Anes Bostandzic; Bosnia and Herzegovina	Ryzvan Talibov; Ukraine
Kumite 84+ kg	Tarek Taha Mahmoud; Egypt	Anes Bostandzic; Bosnia and Herzegovina	Ablay Toltay; Kazakhstan

=== Women ===
Event	Gold	Silver	Bronze
Individual kata	Maho Ono; Japan	Saeko Azuma; Japan	Mirisa Ohuchi; Japan
Individual kata	Maho Ono; Japan	Saeko Azuma; Japan	Grace Lau Mo Sheung; Hong Kong
Kumite -50 kg	Yorgelis Salazar; Venezuela	Reem Ahmed Salama; Egypt	Moldir Zhangbyrbay; Kazakhstan
Kumite -50 kg	Yorgelis Salazar; Venezuela	Reem Ahmed Salama; Egypt	Fidan Teymurova; Azerbaijan
Kumite -55 kg	Airi Shima; Japan	Mia Bitsch; Germany	Gulmira Ussenova; Kazakhstan
Kumite -55 kg	Airi Shima; Japan	Mia Bitsch; Germany	Louiza Abouriche; Algeria
Kumite -61 kg	Atousa Golshadnezhad; Iran	Anita Serogina; Ukraine	Li Gong; China
Kumite -61 kg	Atousa Golshadnezhad; Iran	Anita Serogina; Ukraine	Wafa Mahjoub; Tunisia
Kumite -68 kg	Thalya Sombe; France	Mobina Heydariozomcheloei; Iran	Tsubasa Kama; Japan
Kumite -68 kg	Thalya Sombe; France	Mobina Heydariozomcheloei; Iran	Alizee Agier; France
Kumite 68+ kg	Maria Torres Garcia; Spain	Rochelle Walters; England	Lucija Lesjak; Croatia
Kumite 68+ kg	Maria Torres Garcia; Spain	Rochelle Walters; England	Clio Ferracuti; Italy

== Karate 1 Premier League – Antalya 2024 ==
The Karate 1 Premier League – Antalya 2024 was held from 15 to 17 March 2024 in Antalya, Türkiye.

=== Men ===
Event	Gold	Silver	Bronze
Kumite -60 kg	Abdullah Shaaban; Kuwait	Eray Samda; Turkey	Danilo Greco; Italy
Kumite -60 kg	Abdullah Shaaban; Kuwait	Eray Samda; Turkey	Abdallah Hammad; Jordan
Kumite -67 kg	Said Oubaya; Morocco	Luca Maresca; Italy	Yugo Kozaki; Japan
Kumite -67 kg	Said Oubaya; Morocco	Luca Maresca; Italy	Ozer Omer Abdurrahim; Turkey
Kumite -75 kg	Abdalla Abdelaziz; Egypt	Yurur Omer Faruk; Turkey	Azhikanov Nurkanat; Kazakhstan
Kumite -75 kg	Abdalla Abdelaziz; Egypt	Yurur Omer Faruk; Turkey	Abdelgawad Abdalla Hesham; Egypt
Kumite -84 kg	Badawy Youssef; Egypt	Aljafari Mohammad; Jordan	Kvesic Ivan; Croatia
Kumite -84 kg	Badawy Youssef; Egypt	Aljafari Mohammad; Jordan	Hasanov Turgut; Azerbaijan
Kumite +84 kg	Kvesic Andjelo; Croatia	Mahmoud Taha Tarek; Egypt	Avanzini Matteo; Italy
Kumite +84 kg	Kvesic Andjelo; Croatia	Mahmoud Taha Tarek; Egypt	Anes Bostandzic; Bosnia and Herzegovina
Kata	Nishiyama Kakeru; Japan	Ariel Torres Gutierrez; United States	Abe Sakichi; Japan
Kata	Nishiyama Kakeru; Japan	Ariel Torres Gutierrez; United States	Ghinami Alessio; Italy

=== Women ===
Event	Gold	Silver	Bronze
Kumite -50 kg	Zhangbyrbay Moldir; Kazakhstan	Yorgelis Salazar; Venezuela	Ouikene Cylia; Algeria
Kumite -50 kg	Zhangbyrbay Moldir; Kazakhstan	Yorgelis Salazar; Venezuela	Sgardelli Ema; Croatia
Kumite -55 kg	Samasheva Bella; Kazakhstan	Lallo Viola; Italy	Youssef Ahlam; Egypt
Kumite -55 kg	Samasheva Bella; Kazakhstan	Lallo Viola; Italy	Toro Meneses Valentina; Chile
Kumite -61 kg	Chajai Fatima-Zahra; Morocco	Ajaray Maryam; Belgium	Kanay Assel; Kazakhstan
Kumite -61 kg	Chajai Fatima-Zahra; Morocco	Ajaray Maryam; Belgium	Khamis Reem; Germany
Kumite -68 kg	Quirici Elena; Switzerland	Grejner Wiktoria; Poland	Bodei Pamela; Italy
Kumite -68 kg	Quirici Elena; Switzerland	Grejner Wiktoria; Poland	Semeraro Silvia; Italy
Kumite +68 kg	Kneer Johanna; Germany	Maria Torres Garcia; Spain	Jemi Chehinez; Tunisia
Kumite +68 kg	Kneer Johanna; Germany	Maria Torres Garcia; Spain	Berultseva Sofya; Kazakhstan
Kata	Grace Lau Mo Sheung; Hong Kong	Azuma Saeko; Japan	Bozan Dilara; Turkey
Kata	Grace Lau Mo Sheung; Hong Kong	Azuma Saeko; Japan	Ono Maho; Japan

== Karate1 Premier League - Cairo 2024 ==
The Karate 1 Premier League – Cairo 2024 was held from 19 to 21 April 2024 in Cairo, Egypt.

=== Men ===
Event	Gold	Silver	Bronze
Individual kata	Nishiyama Kakeru; Japan	Sofuoglu Ali; Turkey	Funada Aoi; Japan
Individual kata	Nishiyama Kakeru; Japan	Sofuoglu Ali; Turkey	Ariel Torres Gutierrez; United States
Kumite -60 kg	Hammad Abdallah; Jordan	Hashimoto Hiromu; Japan	Xenos Christos-Stefanos; Greece
Kumite -60 kg	Hammad Abdallah; Jordan	Hashimoto Hiromu; Japan	Alpysbay Kaisar; Kazakhstan
Kumite -67 kg	Almasatfa Abdel Rahman; Jordan	Oubaya Said; Morocco	Ghaith Afeef; Jordan
Kumite -67 kg	Almasatfa Abdel Rahman; Jordan	Oubaya Said; Morocco	Figueira Vinicius; Brazil
Kumite -75 kg	Abdalla Abdelaziz; Egypt	Yurur Omer Faruk; Turkey	Berthon Enzo; France
Kumite -75 kg	Abdalla Abdelaziz; Egypt	Yurur Omer Faruk; Turkey	Farag Youssef; Egypt
Kumite -84 kg	Aljafari Mohammad; Jordan	Badawy Youssef; Egypt	Kvesic Ivan; Croatia
Kumite -84 kg	Aljafari Mohammad; Jordan	Badawy Youssef; Egypt	Sonnykh Valerii; Ukraine
Kumite 84+ kg	Sufyani Sanad; Saudi Arabia	Mahmoud Taha Tarek; Egypt	Timmermans Rob; Curaçao
Kumite 84+ kg	Sufyani Sanad; Saudi Arabia	Mahmoud Taha Tarek; Egypt	Mohamed Hazem; Egypt

=== Women ===
Event	Gold	Silver	Bronze
Individual kata	Mishima Kiri; Japan	Ono Maho; Japan	Grace Lau Mo Sheung; Hong Kong
Individual kata	Mishima Kiri; Japan	Ono Maho; Japan	Azuma Saeko; Japan
Kumite -50 kg	Aly Ganna; Egypt	Zhangbyrbay Moldir; Kazakhstan	Cardenas Balcazar Sofia; Colombia
Kumite -50 kg	Aly Ganna; Egypt	Zhangbyrbay Moldir; Kazakhstan	Ouikene Cylia; Algeria
Kumite -55 kg	Toro Meneses Valentina; Chile	Stoli Maria; Greece	Brunori Veronica; Italy
Kumite -55 kg	Toro Meneses Valentina; Chile	Stoli Maria; Greece	Lallo Viola; Italy
Kumite -61 kg	Khamis Reem; Germany	Nilsson Anna-Johanna; Sweden	Shimada Sarara; Japan
Kumite -61 kg	Khamis Reem; Germany	Nilsson Anna-Johanna; Sweden	Grande Alexandra; Peru
Kumite -68 kg	Kama Tsubasa; Japan	Eltemur Eda; Turkey	Aksoy Sudenur; Turkey
Kumite -68 kg	Kama Tsubasa; Japan	Eltemur Eda; Turkey	Nieto Mejias Maria Isabel; Spain
Kumite 68+ kg	Kneer Johanna; Germany	Maria Torres Garcia; Spain	Berultseva Sofya; Kazakhstan
Kumite 68+ kg	Kneer Johanna; Germany	Maria Torres Garcia; Spain	Keinanen Titta; Finland

== Karate1 Premier League - Casablanca 2024 ==
The Karate 1 Premier League – Casablanca 2024 was held from 31 May to 2 June 2024 in Casablanca, Morocco.

=== Men ===
Event	Gold	Silver	Bronze
Individual kata	Nishiyama Kakeru; Japan	Moto Ryuji; Japan	Abe Sakichi; Japan
Individual kata	Nishiyama Kakeru; Japan	Moto Ryuji; Japan	Moto Kazumasa; Japan
Kumite -60 kg	Hashimoto Hiromu; Japan	Shaaban Abdullah; Kuwait	Alpysbay Kaisar; Kazakhstan
Kumite -60 kg	Hashimoto Hiromu; Japan	Shaaban Abdullah; Kuwait	Jina Abdel Ali; Morocco
Kumite -67 kg	Almasatfa Abdel Rahman; Jordan	Kozaki Yugo; Japan	Oezdemir Muhammed; Germany
Kumite -67 kg	Almasatfa Abdel Rahman; Jordan	Kozaki Yugo; Japan	Tas Yanis; France
Kumite -75 kg	Abdalla Abdelaziz; Egypt	Berthon Enzo; France	Azhikanov Nurkanat; Kazakhstan
Kumite -75 kg	Abdalla Abdelaziz; Egypt	Berthon Enzo; France	Mahauden Quentin; Belgium
Kumite -84 kg	Andrii Toroshanko; Ukraine	Yuldashev Daniyar; Kazakhstan	Konstantinos Mastrogiannis; Greece
Kumite -84 kg	Andrii Toroshanko; Ukraine	Yuldashev Daniyar; Kazakhstan	Eto Junya; Japan
Kumite 84+ kg	Talibov Ryzvan; Ukraine	Mahmoud Taha Tarek; Egypt	Filali Mehdi; France
Kumite 84+ kg	Talibov Ryzvan; Ukraine	Mahmoud Taha Tarek; Egypt	Zouaoui Amir; France

=== Women ===
Event	Gold	Silver	Bronze
Individual kata	Ono Maho; Japan	Ohuchi Mirisa; Japan	Mishima Kiri; Japan
Individual kata	Ono Maho; Japan	Ohuchi Mirisa; Japan	Grace Lau Mo Sheung; Hong Kong
Kumite -50 kg	Salazar Yorgelis; Venezuela	Zhangbyrbay Moldir; Kazakhstan	Okazaki Aika; Japan
Kumite -50 kg	Salazar Yorgelis; Venezuela	Zhangbyrbay Moldir; Kazakhstan	Tsutsumi Sara; Japan
Kumite -55 kg	Toro Meneses Valentina; Chile	Agung Sanistyarani Cok Istri; Indonesia	Lallo Viola; Italy
Kumite -55 kg	Toro Meneses Valentina; Chile	Agung Sanistyarani Cok Istri; Indonesia	Ku Tsui-Ping; Chinese Taipei
Kumite -61 kg	Gong Li; China	Kujuro Yuki; Japan	Sholokhova Oleksandra; Ukraine
Kumite -61 kg	Gong Li; China	Kujuro Yuki; Japan	Khamis Reem; Germany
Kumite -68 kg	Quirici Elena; Switzerland	Hendy Hadir; Egypt	Sombe Thalya; France
Kumite -68 kg	Quirici Elena; Switzerland	Hendy Hadir; Egypt	Sieliemienieva Elina; Ukraine
Kumite 68+ kg	Garcia Nancy; France	Berultseva Sofya; Kazakhstan	Lesjak Lucija; Croatia
Kumite 68+ kg	Garcia Nancy; France	Berultseva Sofya; Kazakhstan	Hocaoglu Akyol Meltem; Turkey

== Grand Winners Award Ceremony 2024 ==
The Grand Winners Gala Ceremony of the Karate1 Premier League took place on 6 May 2024 in Casablanca, Morocco. The event was held at the Four Seasons Hotel and marked the first-ever Grand Winners Gala in the history of the competition.

The ceremony celebrated the top athletes of the season, recognising 12 karatekas as the “Best of the Best” in their respective categories. The event was attended by international karate officials, sports authorities, and athletes from around the world.

The Grand Winners were determined based on their performances across the four Karate 1-Premier League events of the 2024 season, held in Paris (France), Antalya (Turkey), Cairo (Egypt), and Casablanca (Morocco).

=== Grand Winners ===
Category	Athlete	Country
Female Kata	Maho Ono	Japan
Female Kumite -50kg	Moldir Zhangbyrbay	Kazakhstan
Female Kumite -55kg	Valentina Toro	Chile
Female Kumite -61kg	Reem Khamis	Germany
Female Kumite -68kg	Elena Quirici	Switzerland
Female Kumite +68kg	María Torres	Spain
Male Kata	Kakeru Nishiyama	Japan
Male Kumite -60kg	Hiromu Hashimoto	Japan
Male Kumite -67kg	Said Oubaya	Morocco
Male Kumite -75kg	Abdalla Abdelaziz	Egypt
Male Kumite -84kg	Youssef Badawy	Egypt
Male Kumite +84kg	Taha Tarek Mahmoud	Egypt
