= Mobina Heidari =

Iranian karateka

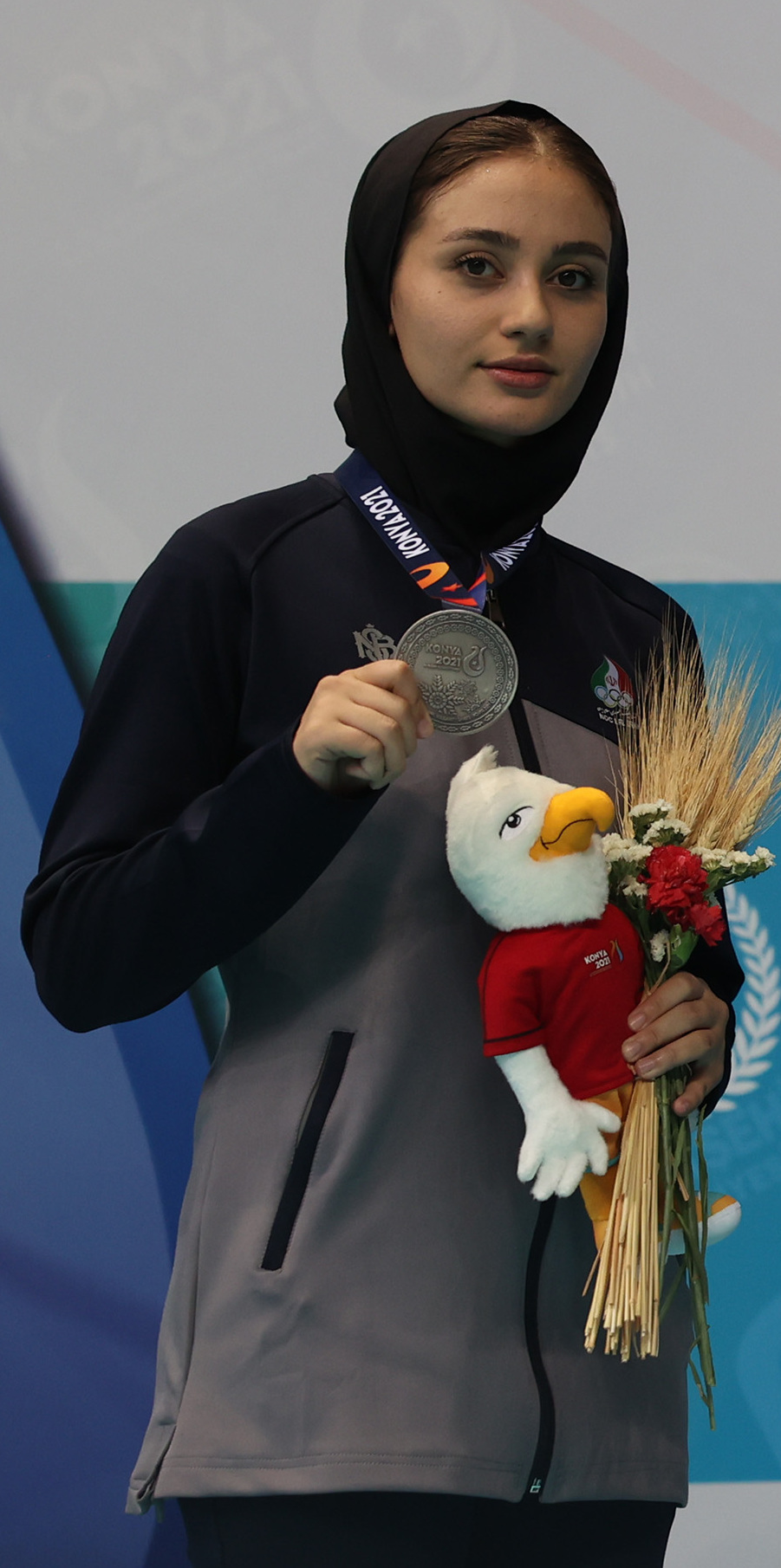
- Heidari at the 2021 Islamic Solidarity Games

Sport
- Country: Iran
- Sport: Karate
- Weight class: 68 kg
- Events: Kumite; Team kumite
Medal record
Women's karate
Representing Iran
Asian Championships
Gold medal – first place	2026 Bali	Team kumite
Silver medal – second place	2021 Almaty	Kumite 68 kg
Silver medal – second place	2023 Malacca	Team kumite
Bronze medal – third place	2022 Tashkent	Kumite 68 kg
Bronze medal – third place	2024 Hangzhou	Kumite 68 kg
Islamic Solidarity Games
Silver medal – second place	2021 Konya	Kumite 68 kg
Summer Youth Olympics
Bronze medal – third place	2018 Buenos Aires	Kumite 59 kg

Mobina Heidari is an Iranian karateka. She won the silver medal in the women's 68 kg event at the 2021 Islamic Solidarity Games held in Konya, Turkey.

She won one of the bronze medals in the girls' 59 kg event at the Summer Youth Olympics held in Buenos Aires, Argentina. In 2021, she won the silver medal in her event at the Asian Karate Championships held in Almaty, Kazakhstan.

She won one of the bronze medals in her event at the 2022 Asian Karate Championships held in Tashkent, Uzbekistan. In 2023, she competed in the women's kumite 68 kg event at the 2022 Asian Games held in Hangzhou, China where she was eliminated in her first match.

== Achievements ==
Year	Competition	Venue	Rank	Event
2021	Asian Championships	Almaty, Kazakhstan	2nd	Kumite 68 kg
2022	Islamic Solidarity Games	Konya, Turkey	2nd	Kumite 68 kg
2022	Asian Championships	Tashkent, Uzbekistan	3rd	Kumite 68 kg
2023	Asian Championships	Malacca, Malaysia	2nd	Team kumite
2024	Asian Championships	Hangzhou, China	3rd	Kumite 68 kg
2026	Asian Championships	Bali, Indonesia	1st	Team kumite
