= 2018 World Karate Championships – Women's team kata =

Karate competition

Women's team kata at the 2018 World Karate Championships
- Location: Madrid, Spain
- Dates: 8-11 November
- Competitors: 24 teams from 24 nations

Medalists
gold medal	Saori Ishibashi; Mai Mugiyama; Sae Taira	Japan
silver medal	Marta García; Lidia Rodríguez; Raquel Roy	Spain
bronze medal	Sara Battaglia; Terryana D'Onofrio; Michela Pezzetti	Italy
bronze medal	Dilara Eltemur; Rabia Küsmüş; Gizem Sofuoğlu	Turkey

The preliminary rounds of the Women's team kata competition at the 2018 World Karate Championships were held on November 8, 2018, and the finals on November 11, 2018.

== Results ==
=== Finals ===
Semi-finals
Italy	0
Spain	5
Turkey	1
Japan	4

Final
Spain	0
Japan	5

=== Repechage ===
Repechage
Slovakia	0
Serbia	5

Third place
Serbia	0
Italy	5

Repechage
Russia	3
Morocco	2

Third place
Russia	0
Turkey	5

=== Top Draw ===
First round
Hong Kong	3
England	2
Romania	0
Colombia	5
Serbia	3
Malaysia	2
Trinidad and Tobago	0
Slovakia	5

Second round
Hong Kong	2
Germany	3
Colombia	0
Italy	5
Serbia	5
Algeria	0
Slovakia	0
Spain	5

Quarterfinals
Germany	0
Italy	5
Serbia	0
Spain	5

Semifinals
Italy	0
Spain	5

=== Bottom Draw ===
First round
Austria	2
Belarus	3
United Arab Emirates	0
Brazil	5
Portugal	3
Peru	2
Russia	3
Croatia	2

Second round
Belarus	1
Iran	4
Brazil	1
Turkey	4
Portugal	2
Morocco	3
Russia	0
Japan	5

Quarterfinals
Iran	0
Turkey	5
Morocco	0
Japan	5

Semifinals
Turkey	1
Japan	4
