= Saori Ishibashi =

Japanese karateka

Sport
- Country: Japan
- Sport: Karate
- Event: Team kata
Medal record
Women's karate
Representing Japan
World Championships
Gold medal – first place	2018 Madrid	Team kata
Gold medal – first place	2021 Dubai	Team kata
Gold medal – first place	2023 Budapest	Team kata
Asian Championships
Gold medal – first place	2018 Amman	Team kata
Gold medal – first place	2019 Tashkent	Team kata
Gold medal – first place	2021 Almaty	Team kata
Gold medal – first place	2022 Tashkent	Team kata
Gold medal – first place	2023 Malacca	Team kata
Gold medal – first place	2024 Hangzhou	Team kata

Saori Ishibashi is a Japanese karateka. She won the gold medal in the women's team kata event at the 2018 World Karate Championships held in Madrid, Spain. She also won the gold medal in the women's team kata event at the 2021 World Karate Championships held in Dubai, United Arab Emirates.

== Achievements ==
Year	Competition	Venue	Rank	Event
2018	Asian Championships	Amman, Jordan	1st	Team kata
2018	World Championships	Madrid, Spain	1st	Team kata
2019	Asian Championships	Tashkent, Uzbekistan	1st	Team kata
2021	World Championships	Dubai, United Arab Emirates	1st	Team kata
2021	Asian Championships	Almaty, Kazakhstan	1st	Team kata
2022	Asian Championships	Tashkent, Uzbekistan	1st	Team kata
2023	Asian Championships	Malacca, Malaysia	1st	Team kata
2023	World Championships	Budapest, Hungary	1st	Team kata
2024	Asian Championships	Hangzhou, China	1st	Team kata
