= Mohammad Al-Mosawi =

Kuwaiti karateka (born 1995)

Mohammed Al-Mosawi
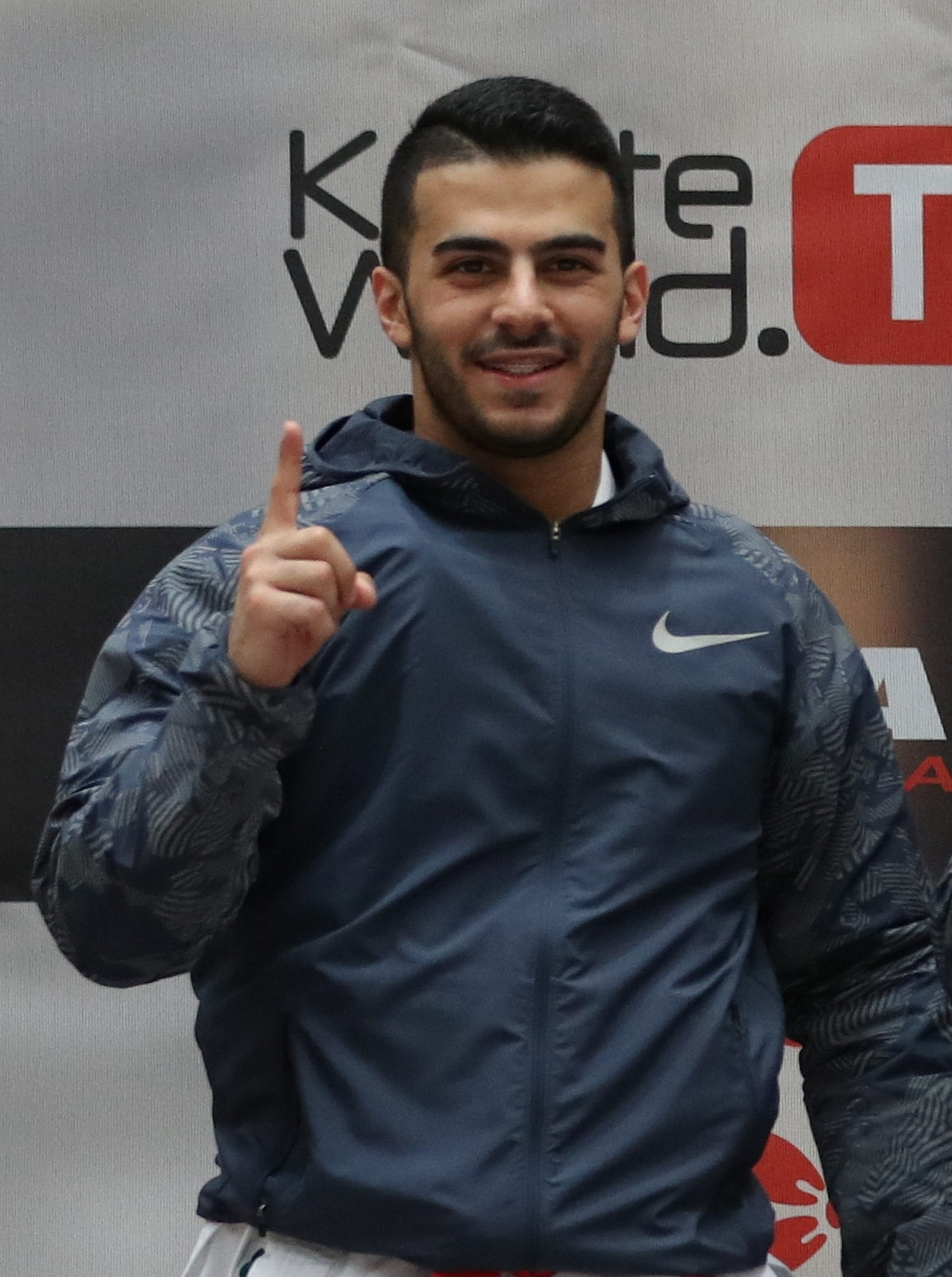

Personal information
- Full name: Sayed Mohammed Al-Mosawi
- National team: Kuwait
- Born: 12 May 1995 (age 31) Rumaithiya, Kuwait
- Height: 166 cm (5 ft 5 in)
- Weight: 69 kg (152 lb)
- Website: Official Instagram Profile

Sport
- Country: Kuwait
- Sport: Karate
- Event: kata
Medal record
Men's karate
Representing Kuwait
Asian Games
Bronze medal – third place	2022 Hangzhou	Team kata
Asian Championships
Gold medal – first place	2024 Hangzhou	Team kata
Silver medal – second place	2022 Tashkent	Team kata
Silver medal – second place	2023 Malacca	Team kata
Bronze medal – third place	2013 Dubai	Team kata
Bronze medal – third place	2015 Yokohama	Team kata
Bronze medal – third place	2018 Amman	Team kata
Bronze medal – third place	2019 Tashkent	Individual kata
Bronze medal – third place	2019 Tashkent	Team kata
Bronze medal – third place	2021 Almaty	Individual kata
Bronze medal – third place	2021 Almaty	Team kata
Bronze medal – third place	2025 Tashkent	Team kata
Bronze medal – third place	2026 Bali	Team kata
Islamic Solidarity Games
Silver medal – second place	2013 Palembang	Team kata
Silver medal – second place	2021 Konya	Team kata
Silver medal – second place	2025 Riyadh	Individual kata

Sayed Mohammed Al-Mosawi (Arabic: سيد محمد الموسوي, born 12 May 1995) is a Kuwaiti karateka. He represented Kuwait at the 2020 Summer Olympics in Tokyo, Japan. He competed in the men's kata event. He finished in 5th place in his pool in the elimination round and he did not advance to the next round.

== Career ==
He won several medals in Asian Championships, Islamic Solidarity Games, Gulf Championship and Arab Championship and a bronze medal in the World Championship in Team Kata Event.

He also won several medals, including gold, Silver and bronze medals in the WKF Karate1 Premier League and Series A Championship.

He won one of the bronze medals in his event at the 2021 Asian Karate Championships held in Almaty, Kazakhstan.

He trains with the national team of Kuwait and, along with his twin brother, Salman Almosawi.

== Achievements ==
Year	Competition	Venue	Rank	Event
2021	KARATE1 PREMIER LEAGUE	Lisbon, Portugal	5th	Team Kata
2021	KARATE1 PREMIER LEAGUE	Lisbon, Portugal	27th	Individual Kata
2020	KARATE1 PREMIER LEAGUE	Salzburg, Austria	3rd	Team Kata
2020	KARATE1 PREMIER LEAGUE	Salzburg, Austria	23rd	Individual Kata
2020	KARATE1 PREMIER LEAGUE	Dubai, United Arab Emirates	1st	Team Kata
2020	KARATE1 PREMIER LEAGUE	Dubai, United Arab Emirates	21st	Individual Kata
2020	KARATE1 PREMIER LEAGUE	Paris, France	23rd	Individual Kata
2020	KARATE1 PREMIER LEAGUE	Paris, France	5th	Team Kata
2019	KARATE1 SERIES A	Santiago, Chile	5th	Individual Kata
2019	KARATE1 PREMIER LEAGUE	Tokyo, Japan	7th	Team Kata
2019	KARATE1 PREMIER LEAGUE	Moscow, Russia	7th	Team Kata
2019	KARATE1 PREMIER LEAGUE	Moscow, Russia	29th	Individual Kata
2019	SENIOR ASIAN CHAMPIONSHIP	Tashkent, Uzbekistan	3rd	Individual Kata
2019	SENIOR ASIAN CHAMPIONSHIP	Tashkent, Uzbekistan	3rd	Team Kata
2019	KARATE1 PREMIER LEAGUE	Shanghai, China	1st	Team Kata
2019	KARATE1 PREMIER LEAGUE	Shanghai, China	19th	Individual Kata
2019	KARATE1 PREMIER LEAGUE	Dubai, United Arab Emirates	2nd	Team Kata
2019	KARATE1 PREMIER LEAGUE	Paris, France	1st	Team Kata
2018	KARATE1 PREMIER LEAGUE	Paris, France	15th	Individual Kata
2018	SENIOR WORLD CHAMPIONSHIP	Madrid, Spain	7th	Individual Kata
2018	SENIOR ASIAN CHAMPIONSHIP	Amman, Jordan	3rd	Team Kata
2018	KARATE1 PREMIER LEAGUE	Istanbul, Turkey	7th	Individual Kata
2018	KARATE1 SERIES A	Salzburg, Austria	9th	Individual Kata
2015	SENIOR ASIAN CHAMPIONSHIP	Yokohama, Japan	3rd	Team Kata
2015	KARATE1 PREMIER LEAGUE	Salzburg, Austria	5th	Individual Kata
2015	KARATE1 YOUTH CUP 2015	Umag, Croatia	1st	Individual Kata
2013	SENIOR ASIAN CHAMPIONSHIP	Dubai, United Arab Emirates	3rd	Team Kata
2013	KARATE1 PREMIER LEAGUE	Istanbul, Turkey	3rd	Individual Kata

He competed at the World Olympic Qualification Tournament held in Paris, France. He did not qualify at this tournament but he qualified after the allocation of Tripartite Commission Invitation places and the reassignment of the last qualifying spots.

He represented the Kuwait Team at the Karate competition of the Olympic Games Tokyo 2020.
