= Karate at the 2025 SEA Games =

- Venue: Chaeng Watthana Government Complex, Lak Si, Bangkok
- Location: Lak Si, Bangkok, Thailand
- Dates: 11–14 December 2025

Karate competitions at the 2025 SEA Games took place at Chaeng Watthana Government Complex in Lak Si, Bangkok, from 11 to 14 December 2025.

== Medal table ==
* Host nation (Thailand)

Rank	Nation	Gold	Silver	Bronze	Total
1	Vietnam	6	3	2	11
2	Thailand*	4	5	2	11
3	Indonesia	2	4	3	9
4	Malaysia	2	1	5	8
5	Singapore	1	0	1	2
6	Philippines	0	1	6	7
7	Myanmar	0	1	2	3
8	Brunei	0	0	2	2
8	Laos	0	0	2	2
Totals (9 entries)		15	15	25	55

== Medalists ==
=== Kata ===
Event	Gold	Silver	Bronze
Men's team	Thailand; Phanudet Khananpao; Inkawat Vichailakana; Natthawut Kanabkaew; Phatchara Yantapanich	Malaysia; Luqman Syah Ahmad Jasman Syah; Muhammad Aiqal Asmadie; Muhammad Arif Hafizi Hishamadi; Mohamad Haznil Henry	Vietnam; Lê Hồng Phúc; Phạm Minh Đức; Giang Việt Anh; Phạm Minh Quân
Men's team	Thailand; Phanudet Khananpao; Inkawat Vichailakana; Natthawut Kanabkaew; Phatchara Yantapanich	Malaysia; Luqman Syah Ahmad Jasman Syah; Muhammad Aiqal Asmadie; Muhammad Arif Hafizi Hishamadi; Mohamad Haznil Henry	Philippines; Felix Jr. Calipusan; Jodan Macalipay; Jeremy Laurence Nopre
Women's team	Vietnam; Hoàng Thị Thu Uyên; Bùi Ngọc Nhi; Nguyễn Ngọc Trâm; Nguyễn Thị Phương	Thailand; Monsicha Sakulrattananatara; Ramitar Terananon; Irinlada Sriargardkraisang; Phatcharin Plangplai	Malaysia; Niathalia Sherawinnie Yampil; Naccy Nelly Evvaferra Rojin; Ivy Olivera Donny; Lovely Anne Robberth
Women's team	Vietnam; Hoàng Thị Thu Uyên; Bùi Ngọc Nhi; Nguyễn Ngọc Trâm; Nguyễn Thị Phương	Thailand; Monsicha Sakulrattananatara; Ramitar Terananon; Irinlada Sriargardkraisang; Phatcharin Plangplai	Indonesia; Emilia Sri Hanandyta; Dian Monika Nababan; Beatrix Helena Pangemanan

=== Kumite ===
==== Men ====
Event	Gold	Silver	Bronze
—55 kg	Thevendran Kaliana Sundram; Malaysia	Chu Văn Đức; Vietnam	Ak Ahmad Munib Aiman Pg Hj Md Hasimudin; Brunei
—55 kg	Thevendran Kaliana Sundram; Malaysia	Chu Văn Đức; Vietnam	Chanphet Setthaphong; Thailand
–60 kg	Siwakon Muekthong; Thailand	John Christian Lachica; Philippines	Muhammad Harith Bin Dahlan; Brunei
–60 kg	Siwakon Muekthong; Thailand	John Christian Lachica; Philippines	Geerijaieswaran Sivanesan; Malaysia
–67 kg	Khuất Hải Nam; Vietnam	Worakrit Chanchang; Thailand	John Matthew Manantan; Philippines
–67 kg	Khuất Hải Nam; Vietnam	Worakrit Chanchang; Thailand	Sureeya Sankar Hari Sankar; Malaysia
–75 kg	Ignatius Joshua Kandou; Indonesia	Võ Văn Hiến; Vietnam	Isaiah Tang; Singapore
–75 kg	Ignatius Joshua Kandou; Indonesia	Võ Văn Hiến; Vietnam	Alwyn Batican; Philippines
–84 kg	Nguyễn Thanh Trường; Vietnam	Arif Fadhillah; Indonesia	Teerapat Kanabkaew; Thailand
+84 kg	Teerawat Kangtong; Thailand	Daniel Hutapea; Indonesia	Khamphaphongphane Khamphavong; Laos
Team	Thailand; Thanaphat Wingwong; Teerawat Kangtong; Martin Van Der Herten; Songvut Muntaen; Siwakon Muekthong; Natthakrit Ingloy; Teerapat Kanabkaew	Indonesia; Muhammad Tegar Januar; Ignatius Joshua Kandou; Nur Halim Arlendi; Daniel Hutapea; I Komang Astawa Setiabudi; Arif Fadhillah	Philippines; John Matthew Manantan; Sharief Afif; John Christian Lachica; Ray Carlo Silva; Richelieu Felipe; Daniel James Deblois; Alwyn Batican
Team	Thailand; Thanaphat Wingwong; Teerawat Kangtong; Martin Van Der Herten; Songvut Muntaen; Siwakon Muekthong; Natthakrit Ingloy; Teerapat Kanabkaew	Indonesia; Muhammad Tegar Januar; Ignatius Joshua Kandou; Nur Halim Arlendi; Daniel Hutapea; I Komang Astawa Setiabudi; Arif Fadhillah	Malaysia; Prem Kumar Selvam; Sureeya Sankar Hari Sankar; Leidaneswaran Asaithamby; Thevendran Kaliana Sundram; Logen Vijaya Kumar; Shiv Ram Prakash; Geerijaieswaran Sivanesan

==== Women ====
Event	Gold	Silver	Bronze
–50 kg	Shahmalarani Chandran; Malaysia	Florence Nay Chi Htun; Myanmar	Marie June Adriano; Philippines
–50 kg	Shahmalarani Chandran; Malaysia	Florence Nay Chi Htun; Myanmar	Nguyễn Thị Thu; Vietnam
–55 kg	Marissa Hafezan; Singapore	Nguyễn Thị Diệu Ly; Vietnam	Maryanne Jenelle Montalvo; Philippines
–55 kg	Marissa Hafezan; Singapore	Nguyễn Thị Diệu Ly; Vietnam	Adeola Fay Robert; Malaysia
–61 kg	Hoàng Thị Mỹ Tâm; Vietnam	Maneevan Butsuwan; Thailand	Ni Made Dwi Kartika Aprianti; Indonesia
–61 kg	Hoàng Thị Mỹ Tâm; Vietnam	Maneevan Butsuwan; Thailand	Yoon Thin Zar; Myanmar
–68 kg	Đinh Thị Hương; Vietnam	Ceyco Georgia Zefanya; Indonesia	Ei Ei Moe; Myanmar
–68 kg	Đinh Thị Hương; Vietnam	Ceyco Georgia Zefanya; Indonesia	Zakiah Adnan; Malaysia
+68 kg	Leica Al Humaira Lubis; Indonesia	Kewalin Songklin; Thailand	Konenyvong Souphaphone; Laos
Team	Vietnam; Nguyễn Thị Diệu Ly; Nguyễn Thị Thu; Đinh Thị Hương; Hoàng Thị Mỹ Tâm	Thailand; Chanyanut Chippensuk; Penpisut Namkhao; Yanisa Sonthong; Kewalin Songklin	Indonesia; Ni Made Dwi Kartika Apriani; Cok Istri Agung Sanistyarani; Nurmala Erlyawati; Ceyco Georgia Zefanya
Team	Vietnam; Nguyễn Thị Diệu Ly; Nguyễn Thị Thu; Đinh Thị Hương; Hoàng Thị Mỹ Tâm	Thailand; Chanyanut Chippensuk; Penpisut Namkhao; Yanisa Sonthong; Kewalin Songklin	Malaysia; Mirza Amirah Syuhada Mohd Faizal; Madhuri Poovanesan; Adeola Fay Robert; Shahmalarani Chandran
