= Shahmalarani Chandran =

Malaysian karateka (born 1998)

Personal information
- Born: 12 December 1998 (age 27) Selangor, Malaysia

Sport
- Country: Malaysia
- Sport: Karate
- Weight class: 50 kg
- Event: Kumite
Medal record
Women's karate
Representing Malaysia
World Championships
Silver medal – second place	2025 Cairo	Kumite 50 kg
Asian Championships
Silver medal – second place	2024 Hangzhou	Kumite −50 kg
Silver medal – second place	2025 Tashkent	Kumite −50 kg
Asian Games
Gold medal – first place	2026 Aichi–Nagoya	Kumite 50 kg
SEA Games
Gold medal – first place	2021 Vietnam	Kumite 50 kg
Gold medal – first place	2023 Cambodia	Kumite 50 kg
Gold medal – first place	2025 Thailand	Kumite 50 kg
Bronze medal – third place	2023 Cambodia	Team kumite
Bronze medal – third place	2025 Thailand	Team kumite
ASEAN University Games
Gold medal – first place	2022 Ubon Ratchathani	Kumite 50 kg
Gold medal – first place	2022 Ubon Ratchathani	Team kumite
Bronze medal – third place	2024 Surabaya–Malang	Kumite 50 kg
Bronze medal – third place	2024 Surabaya–Malang	Team kumite

Shahmalarani Chandran (born 12 December 1998) is a Malaysian karateka who specializes in kumite. She is a medalist at the World Karate Championships and the Asian Games. She also won multiple medals at the ASEAN University Games, SEA Games and the Asian Karate Championships.

== Early life ==
Born in Selangor, Shahmalarani took up cross-country and long-distance running before taking up karate at the age of 12. She attended Taylor's College and has a degree in science.

== Career ==
In May 2022, Shahmalarani competed in the delayed 2021 SEA Games and won the gold medal in the kumite −50 kg event. In July, she competed in the 2022 ASEAN University Games and won the gold medal in the kumite 50 kg and team kumite events. The following month, she competed at the Konya 2021 Islamic Solidarity Games and lost to Serap Özçelik in the third-place match.

Shahmalarani competed in the 2023 SEA Games in the kumite −50 kg category and faced Junna Tsukii in the final. After her bout against Tsukii ended in a tie, the judges remained split in voting the winner before the referee awarded the win to Shahmalarani. She also competed in the women's 50 kg event at the 2022 Asian Games held in Hangzhou, China.

In Summer 2024, Shahmalarani competed in the 2024 ASEAN University Games and won a bronze medal in the kumite 50 kg and team kumite events. She then competed in the Asian Karate Championships and won a bronze medal in the kumite −50 kg event.

In May 2025, Shahmalarani competed in the Asian Karate Championships, where she won the silver medal in the kumite −50 kg event, losing to Gulshan Alimardanova in the final. In November, she competed in the World Karate Championships, where she won the silver medal in the women's kumite 50 kg event. She lost to Alimardanova in the gold medal match. At the 2025 SEA Games, Shahmalarani won the gold medal in the women's kumite 50 kg event on her 27th birthday.

In September 2026, Shahmalarani competed in the 2026 Asian Games and won the gold medal in the 50 kg event.
