= Maho Ono =

Japanese karateka (born 1999)

Personal information
- Native name: 尾野 真歩
- Nationality: Japanese
- Born: February 9, 1999 (age 27) Tokyo, Japan

Sport
- Country: Japan
- Sport: Karate
- Event: Individual kata
- Club: Keio University Karate Club
Medal record
Women's karate
Representing Japan
World Karate Championships
Silver medal – second place	2025 Cairo	Individual kata
World Games
Silver medal – second place	2025 Chengdu	Individual kata
Asian Games
Gold medal – first place	2026 Aichi-Nagoya	Individual kata
Asian Karate Championships
Gold medal – first place	2026 Bali	Individual kata
Silver medal – second place	2025 Tashkent	Individual kata

Maho Ono (Japanese: 尾野 真歩; born 9 February 1999) is a Japanese karateka who competes in women's individual kata. She won the gold medal in the women's individual kata event at the 2026 Asian Games in Aichi and Nagoya, Japan. She also won the gold medal at the 2026 Asian Karate Championships in Bali, Indonesia, and the silver medal at the 2025 World Karate Championships in Cairo, Egypt.

== Career ==
Ono began practising karate at the age of five. She attended Nihon University Tsurugaoka High School before studying at Keio University, where she was a member of the university karate club. She later joined Kikkoman and continued competing internationally in women's individual kata.

In 2022, Ono finished third at the All Japan Karate Championships. The following year, she won bronze medals at the Karate1 Premier League events in Dublin and Cairo and finished fifth in Rabat.

Ono had a breakthrough season in 2024. She won the women's individual kata events at the 2024 Karate1 Premier League tournaments in Paris and Casablanca. Her results across the season also earned her the Premier League Grand Winner title in women's kata.

In May 2025, Ono won the silver medal in women's individual kata at the 2025 Asian Karate Championships in Tashkent, Uzbekistan. Later that year, she won the silver medal at the 2025 World Games in Chengdu, China, finishing behind Hong Kong's Grace Lau. At the 2025 World Karate Championships in Cairo, she again won silver in individual kata, finishing second behind Grace Lau.

In June 2026, Ono won the women's individual kata title at the 2026 Asian Karate Championships in Bali, Indonesia. Her victory made her the first Asian champion in women's individual kata from Keio University's karate club.

At the 2026 Asian Games in Aichi and Nagoya, Ono won the gold medal in the women's individual kata event. She defeated Hong Kong's Grace Lau in the final, becoming the ninth consecutive Japanese winner of the women's individual kata title at the Asian Games.
