= 2025 CIS Games =

Multi-sport event in Azerbaijan

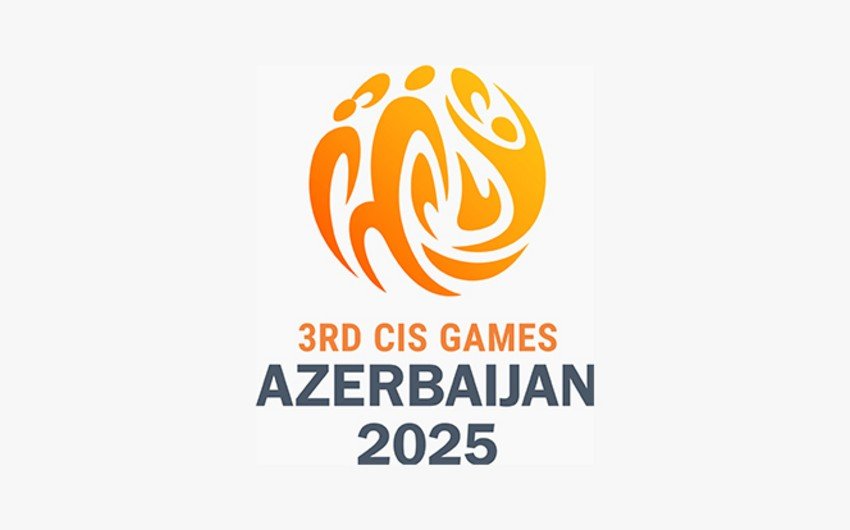
- Host city: Ganja
- Country: Azerbaijan
- Edition: 3rd
- Events: 232
- Website: https://azerbaijan2025.com/

The 2025 CIS Games (Azerbaijani: III MDB Oyunları) were the third edition of the CIS Games, which took place in September–October 2025 in eight cities of Azerbaijan. As of September 2025, participation of 1,624 athletes from 13 countries had been confirmed.

== General ==
The 2025 CIS Games will be held in 2025 in Ganja, which was designated as the "Sports Capital of the Commonwealth of Independent States", as well as in six other cities of the country. The Ganja Sports Palace was inaugurated in April 2024. The competitions are scheduled for the period from 28 September to 8 October and will feature 23 sports. Eight of them will be held in Ganja, four in Mingachevir, four in Qabala, three in Shaki, two in Goygol, and one each in Yevlakh and Khankendi. In addition to teams from the CIS countries, athletes from other states are expected to participate by invitation of the Government of Azerbaijan.

A total of 246 medal events are planned. The largest number (40 sets) of medals will be contested in swimming.

The competitions will be held at 12 sports venues.

The official mascots of the Games are caucasian leopards Bebir and Leyla, and the competitions will be held under the motto "Victory in Every Heart".

The opening and closing ceremonies will take place at the Ganja City Stadium.

== Host cities ==
- Ganja
- Mingachevir
- Qabala
- Shaki
- Goygol
- Yevlakh
- Khankendi
- Baku

== The games ==
Competitions will be held in 19 (23) sports.

=== Participating nations ===
As of 15 July 2025, 1,846 athletes from eight countries had confirmed their participation in the Games. On 26 August, Turkey and Kuwait also confirmed their participation. By that time, 1,605 athletes had registered across 23 sports. As of 25 September, participation of 1,624 athletes from 13 countries had been confirmed.

In addition, 2,337 delegation members are expected to take part.

=== Age ===
All sports in U23 except Football in U16.

=== Sports (19) ===
Combat Sports:

1. Boxing (22)
2. Fencing (8)
3. Judo (17)
4. Karate (12)
5. Taekwondo (14)
6. Sambo (8)
7. Wrestling (28)

Team Sports:

1. Basketball 3 On 3 (2)
2. Chovgan (1): Azerbaijan,Uzbekistan,Kyrgyzstan
3. Football U16 (1)
4. Volleyball (2)

Individual Sports:

1. Archery (5)
2. Badminton (6)
3. Canoeing (Sprint) (15)
4. Gymnastics : Rhythmic @ Trampoline (9 + 7)
5. Rowing (4)
6. Shooting : Rifle - Pistol @ Shotgun (10 + 10)
7. Swimming (42)
8. Table Tennis (9)

=== Nations (13) ===
CIS countries:

1. Azerbaijan (340 / 475)
2. Belarus (240)
3. Kazakhstan (259)
4. Kyrgyzstan (126)
5. Uzbekistan (254)
6. Tajikistan (144)
7. Turkmenistan (48)
8. Russia (262)

Invited countries:

1. Cuba (0)
2. Pakistan (4)
3. Kuwait (6)
4. Oman (4)
5. Turkey (38)

== Medal table ==
Rank	Nation	Gold	Silver	Bronze	Total
1	Russia	130	61	40	231
2	Azerbaijan	33	56	95	184
3	Belarus	32	38	52	122
4	Uzbekistan	25	33	61	119
5	Kazakhstan	10	24	48	82
6	Kyrgyzstan	1	15	9	25
7	Tajikistan	1	5	16	22
8	Turkmenistan	0	0	2	2
9	Pakistan	0	0	1	1
9	Turkey	0	0	1	1
11	Cuba	0	0	0	0
11	Kuwait	0	0	0	0
11	Oman	0	0	0	0
Totals (13 entries)		232	232	325	789

Source: Medal table

https://azerbaijan2025.com/

https://wrs.azerbaijan2025.com/schedule/grid

https://wrs.azerbaijan2025.com/schedule/disciplines

https://azerbaijan2025.com/final-medal-standings-of-the-3rd-cis-games-azerbaijan-takes-second-place/

== Results ==
=== Total ===
Rank	Nation	Gold	Silver	Bronze	Total
1	Russia	130	61	40	231
2	Azerbaijan	33	56	95	184
3	Belarus	32	38	52	122
4	Uzbekistan	25	33	61	119
5	Kazakhstan	10	24	48	82
6	Kyrgyzstan	1	15	9	25
7	Tajikistan	1	5	16	22
8	Turkmenistan	0	0	2	2
9	Pakistan	0	0	1	1
9	Turkey	0	0	1	1
11	Cuba	0	0	0	0
11	Kuwait	0	0	0	0
11	Oman	0	0	0	0
Totals (13 entries)		232	232	325	789

=== Archery ===
Rank	Nation	Gold	Silver	Bronze	Total
1	Russia	2	2	3	7
2	Kazakhstan	1	2	0	3
3	Uzbekistan	1	1	1	3
4	Belarus	1	0	1	2
Totals (4 entries)		5	5	5	15

=== Badminton ===
Rank	Nation	Gold	Silver	Bronze	Total
1	Russia	6	3	0	9
2	Azerbaijan	0	1	6	7
3	Belarus	0	1	4	5
4	Uzbekistan	0	1	0	1
5	Kazakhstan	0	0	2	2
Totals (5 entries)		6	6	12	24

=== Basketball 3on3 ===
Rank	Nation	Gold	Silver	Bronze	Total
1	Russia	2	0	0	2
2	Belarus	0	1	1	2
3	Azerbaijan	0	1	0	1
4	Uzbekistan	0	0	1	1
Totals (4 entries)		2	2	2	6

=== Boxing ===
Rank	Nation	Gold	Silver	Bronze	Total
1	Uzbekistan	10	5	5	20
2	Azerbaijan	6	5	13	24
3	Russia	3	7	6	16
4	Kazakhstan	2	1	11	14
5	Tajikistan	1	2	4	7
6	Belarus	0	1	4	5
7	Kyrgyzstan	0	1	0	1
8	Turkmenistan	0	0	1	1
Totals (8 entries)		22	22	44	88

=== Canoe Sprint ===
Rank	Nation	Gold	Silver	Bronze	Total
1	Belarus	9	1	1	11
2	Russia	6	5	2	13
3	Uzbekistan	0	4	7	11
4	Kyrgyzstan	0	3	0	3
5	Azerbaijan	0	1	3	4
6	Tajikistan	0	1	2	3
Totals (6 entries)		15	15	15	45

=== Chovgan ===
Rank	Nation	Gold	Silver	Bronze	Total
1	Azerbaijan	1	0	0	1
2	Uzbekistan	0	1	0	1
3	Kyrgyzstan	0	0	1	1
Totals (3 entries)		1	1	1	3

=== Fencing ===
Rank	Nation	Gold	Silver	Bronze	Total
1	Russia	7	5	1	13
2	Uzbekistan	1	1	5	7
3	Azerbaijan	0	2	7	9
4	Belarus	0	0	2	2
5	Kazakhstan	0	0	1	1
Totals (5 entries)		8	8	16	32

=== Football ===
Rank	Nation	Gold	Silver	Bronze	Total
1	Russia	1	0	0	1
2	Azerbaijan	0	1	0	1
3	Belarus	0	0	1	1
Totals (3 entries)		1	1	1	3

=== Judo ===
Rank	Nation	Gold	Silver	Bronze	Total
1	Russia	7	4	3	14
2	Azerbaijan	6	7	9	22
3	Uzbekistan	2	3	8	13
4	Belarus	2	2	4	8
5	Tajikistan	0	1	2	3
Totals (5 entries)		17	17	26	60

=== Karate ===
Rank	Nation	Gold	Silver	Bronze	Total
1	Azerbaijan	6	3	7	16
2	Kazakhstan	3	3	2	8
3	Russia	1	3	4	8
4	Uzbekistan	1	2	6	9
5	Belarus	1	0	4	5
6	Kyrgyzstan	0	1	1	2
Totals (6 entries)		12	12	24	48

=== Rhythmic Gymnastics ===
Rank	Nation	Gold	Silver	Bronze	Total
1	Russia	9	0	0	9
2	Belarus	0	5	0	5
3	Azerbaijan	0	4	4	8
4	Kazakhstan	0	0	3	3
5	Uzbekistan	0	0	2	2
Totals (5 entries)		9	9	9	27

=== Rowing ===
Rank	Nation	Gold	Silver	Bronze	Total
1	Belarus	2	1	1	4
1	Uzbekistan	2	1	1	4
3	Russia	0	2	2	4
Totals (3 entries)		4	4	4	12

=== Sambo ===
Rank	Nation	Gold	Silver	Bronze	Total
1	Russia	4	1	2	7
2	Azerbaijan	2	3	3	8
3	Uzbekistan	2	1	4	7
4	Kyrgyzstan	0	2	2	4
5	Belarus	0	1	1	2
6	Kazakhstan	0	0	2	2
6	Tajikistan	0	0	2	2
Totals (7 entries)		8	8	16	32

=== Shooting (Rifle / Pistol) ===
Rank	Nation	Gold	Silver	Bronze	Total
1	Russia	9	1	2	12
2	Kazakhstan	1	4	2	7
3	Azerbaijan	0	2	1	3
4	Belarus	0	1	3	4
5	Uzbekistan	0	1	2	3
6	Kyrgyzstan	0	1	0	1
Totals (6 entries)		10	10	10	30

=== Shooting (Shotgun) ===
Rank	Nation	Gold	Silver	Bronze	Total
1	Russia	9	2	3	14
2	Uzbekistan	1	1	1	3
3	Azerbaijan	0	5	4	9
4	Kazakhstan	0	2	6	8
Totals (4 entries)		10	10	14	34

=== Swimming ===
Rank	Nation	Gold	Silver	Bronze	Total
1	Russia	36	13	7	56
2	Belarus	4	15	16	35
3	Azerbaijan	2	5	6	13
4	Kazakhstan	0	9	10	19
5	Uzbekistan	0	0	3	3
Totals (5 entries)		42	42	42	126

=== Table Tennis ===
Rank	Nation	Gold	Silver	Bronze	Total
1	Russia	9	1	0	10
2	Azerbaijan	0	6	3	9
3	Belarus	0	1	6	7
3	Uzbekistan	0	1	6	7
5	Kazakhstan	0	0	3	3
Totals (5 entries)		9	9	18	36

=== Taekwondo ===
Rank	Nation	Gold	Silver	Bronze	Total
1	Russia	5	2	1	8
2	Azerbaijan	4	2	16	22
3	Belarus	3	2	2	7
4	Kazakhstan	2	2	3	7
5	Uzbekistan	0	4	3	7
6	Kyrgyzstan	0	2	1	3
7	Tajikistan	0	0	2	2
Totals (7 entries)		14	14	28	56

=== Trampoline Gymnastics ===
Rank	Nation	Gold	Silver	Bronze	Total
1	Belarus	6	1	0	7
2	Azerbaijan	1	2	3	6
3	Russia	0	4	1	5
4	Kazakhstan	0	0	2	2
5	Turkey	0	0	1	1
Totals (5 entries)		7	7	7	21

=== Volleyball ===
Rank	Nation	Gold	Silver	Bronze	Total
1	Russia	2	0	0	2
2	Belarus	0	2	0	2
3	Azerbaijan	0	0	1	1
3	Uzbekistan	0	0	1	1
Totals (4 entries)		2	2	2	6

=== Wrestling ===
Rank	Nation	Gold	Silver	Bronze	Total
1	Russia	12	6	3	21
2	Azerbaijan	5	6	9	20
3	Uzbekistan	5	6	5	16
4	Belarus	4	3	1	8
5	Kyrgyzstan	1	5	4	10
6	Kazakhstan	1	1	1	3
7	Tajikistan	0	1	4	5
8	Pakistan	0	0	1	1
8	Turkmenistan	0	0	1	1
Totals (9 entries)		28	28	29	85

== Gallery ==
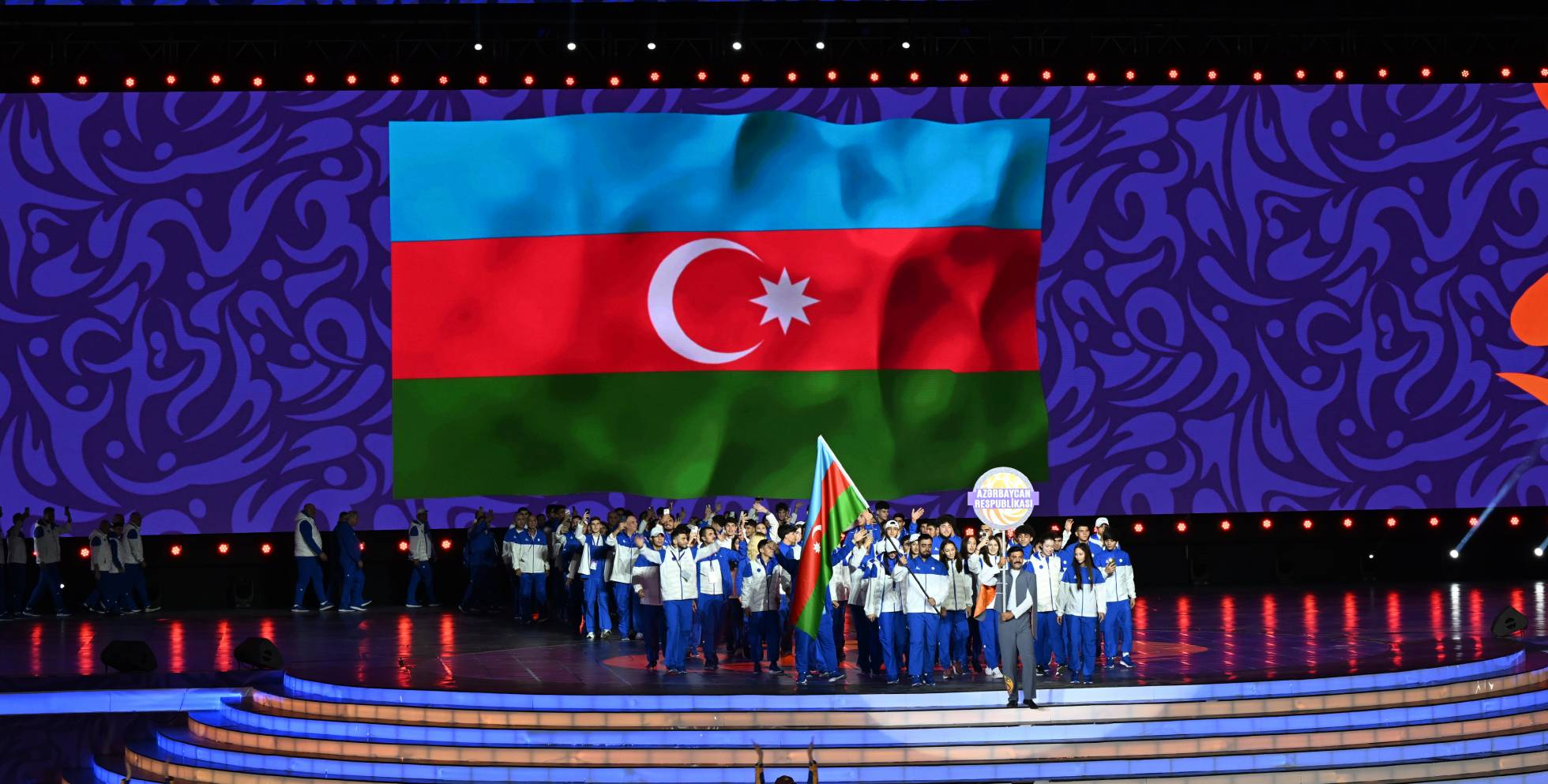
Opening ceremony

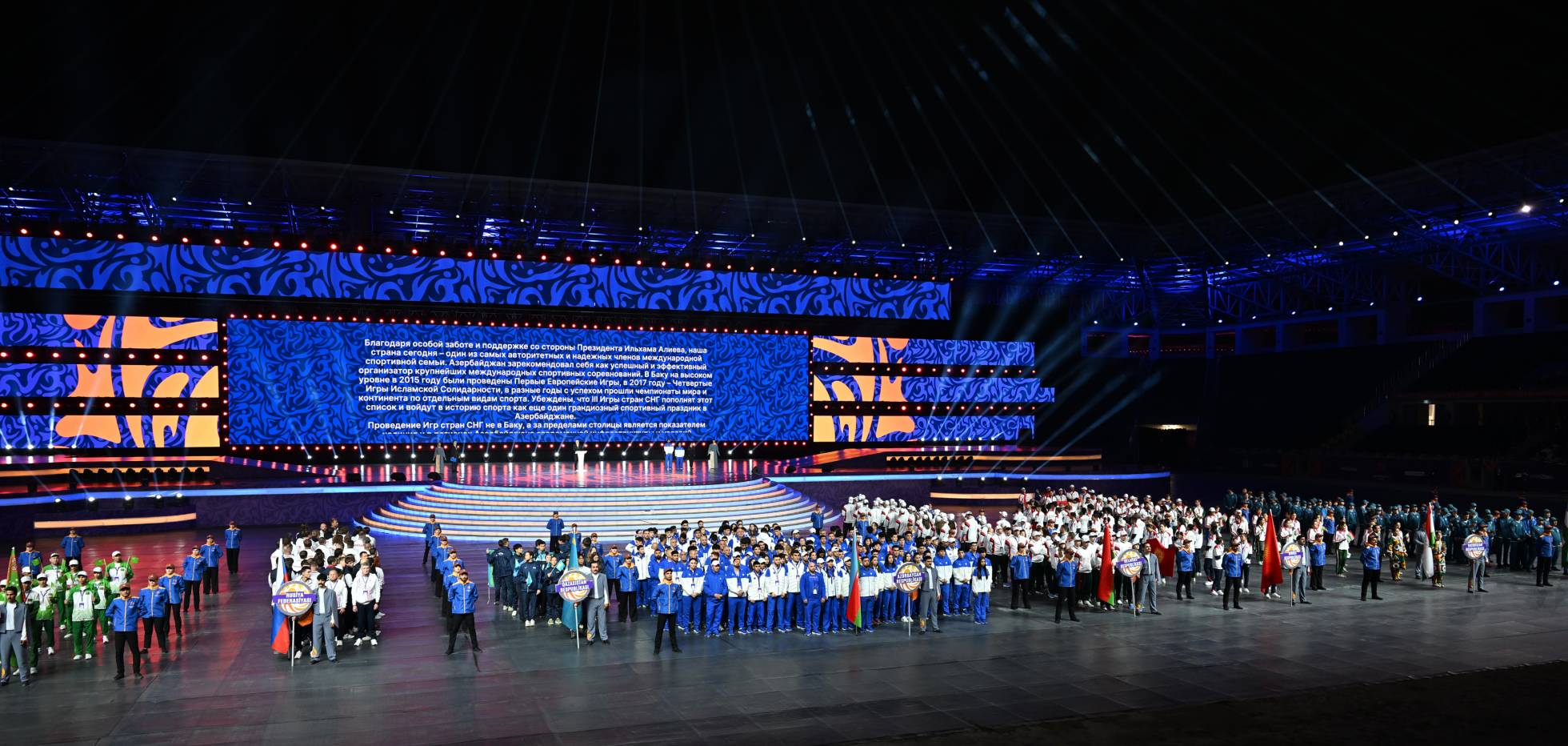
Opening ceremony

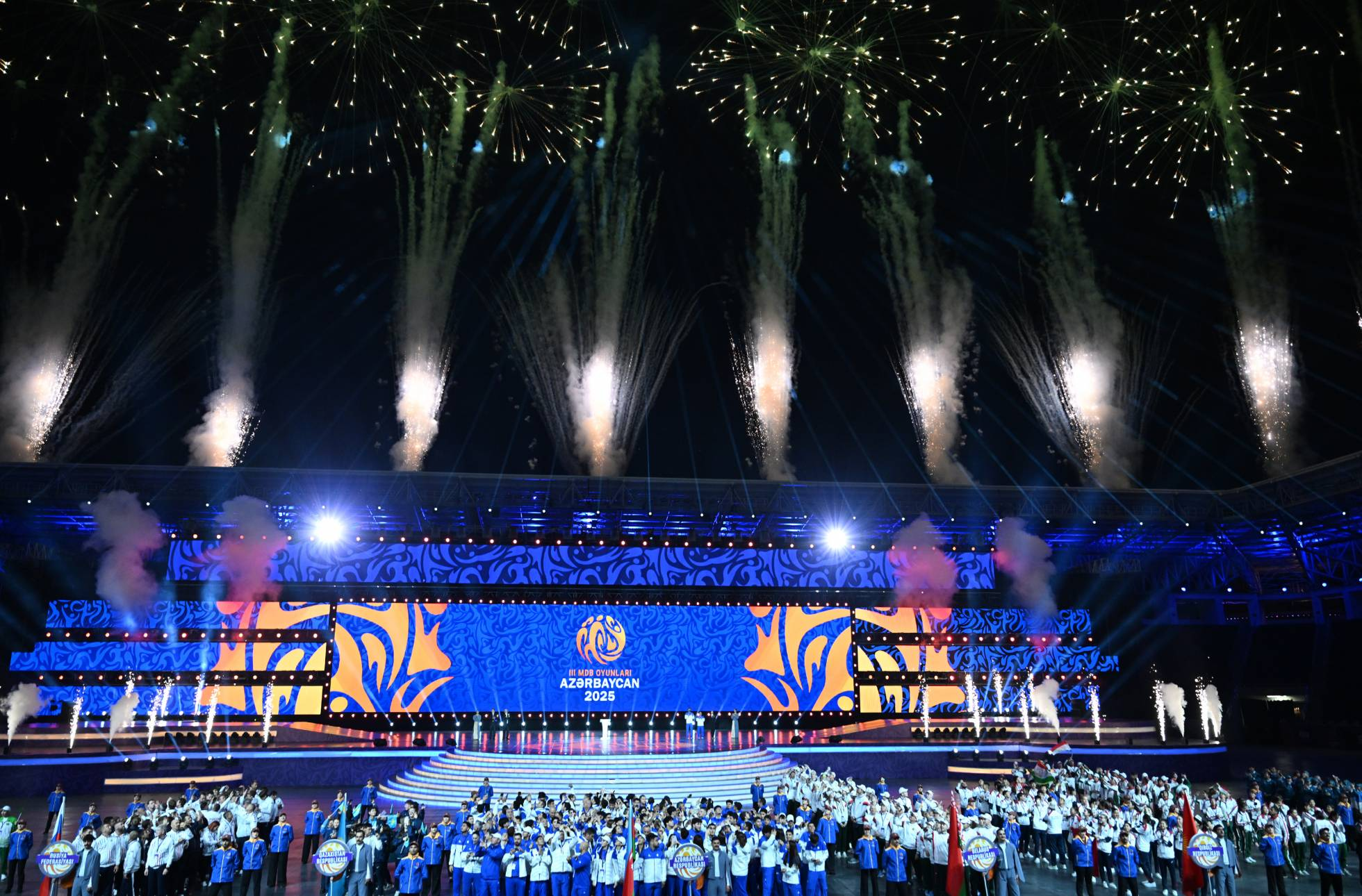
Opening ceremony

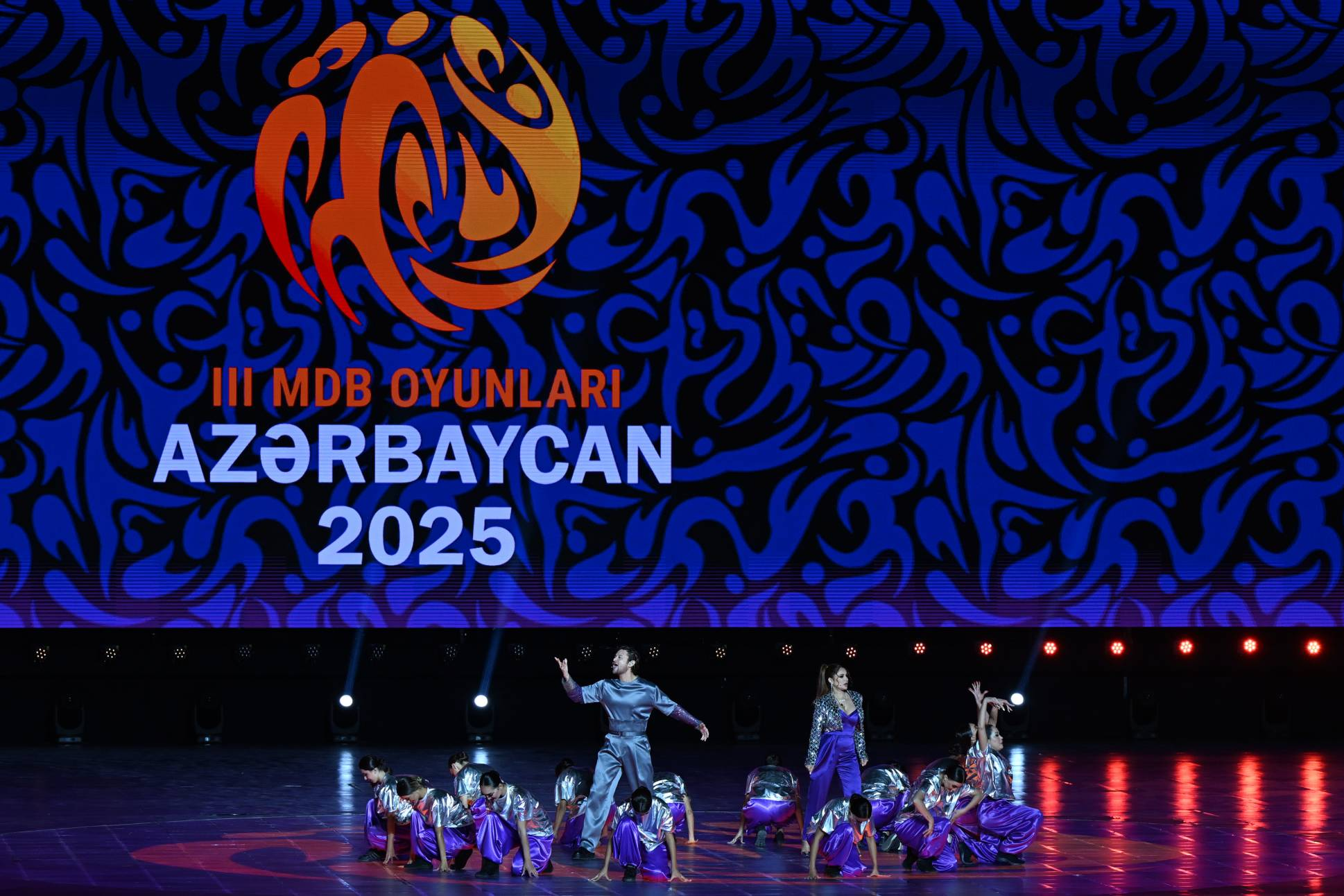
Opening ceremony

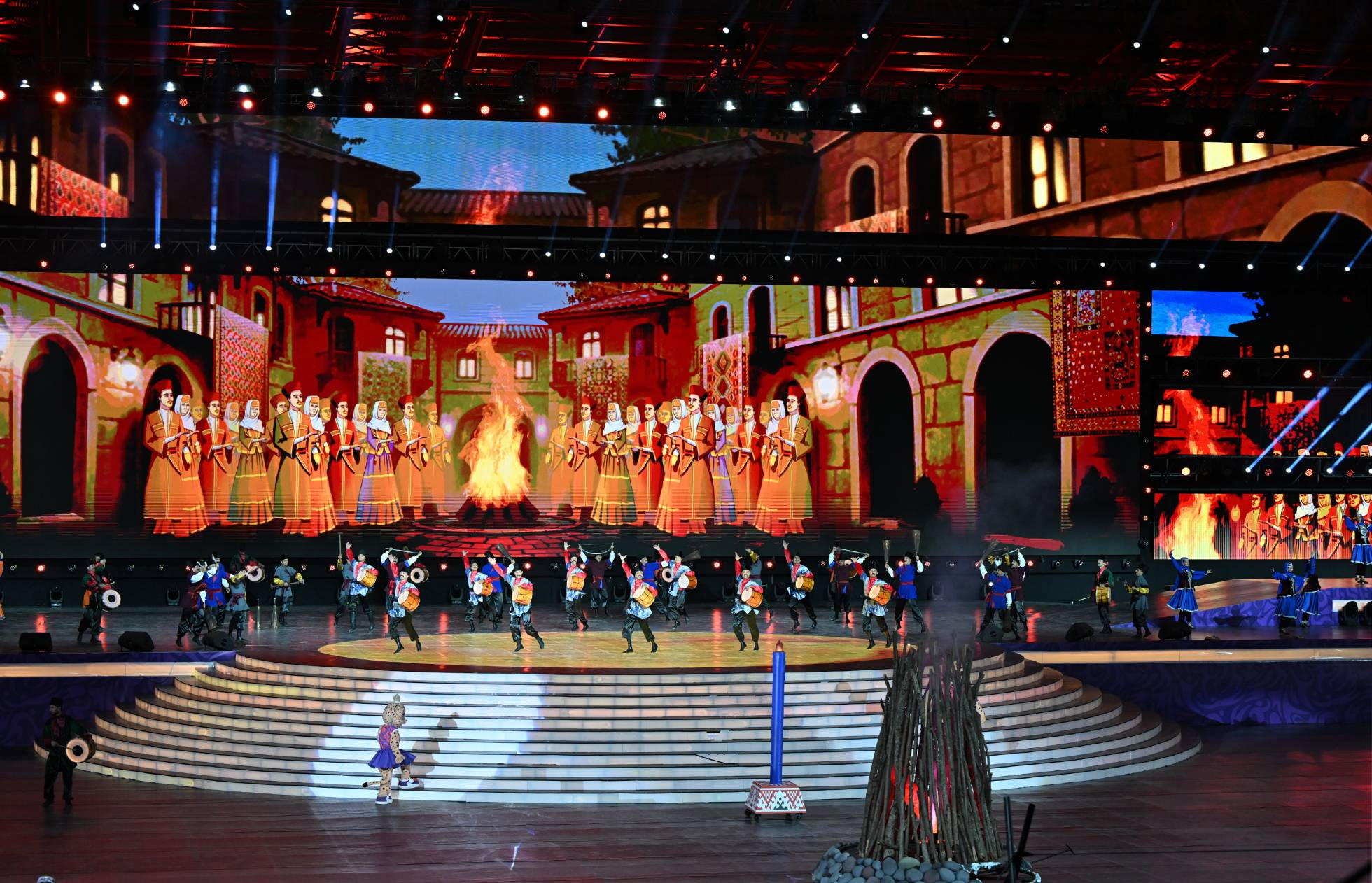
Opening ceremony

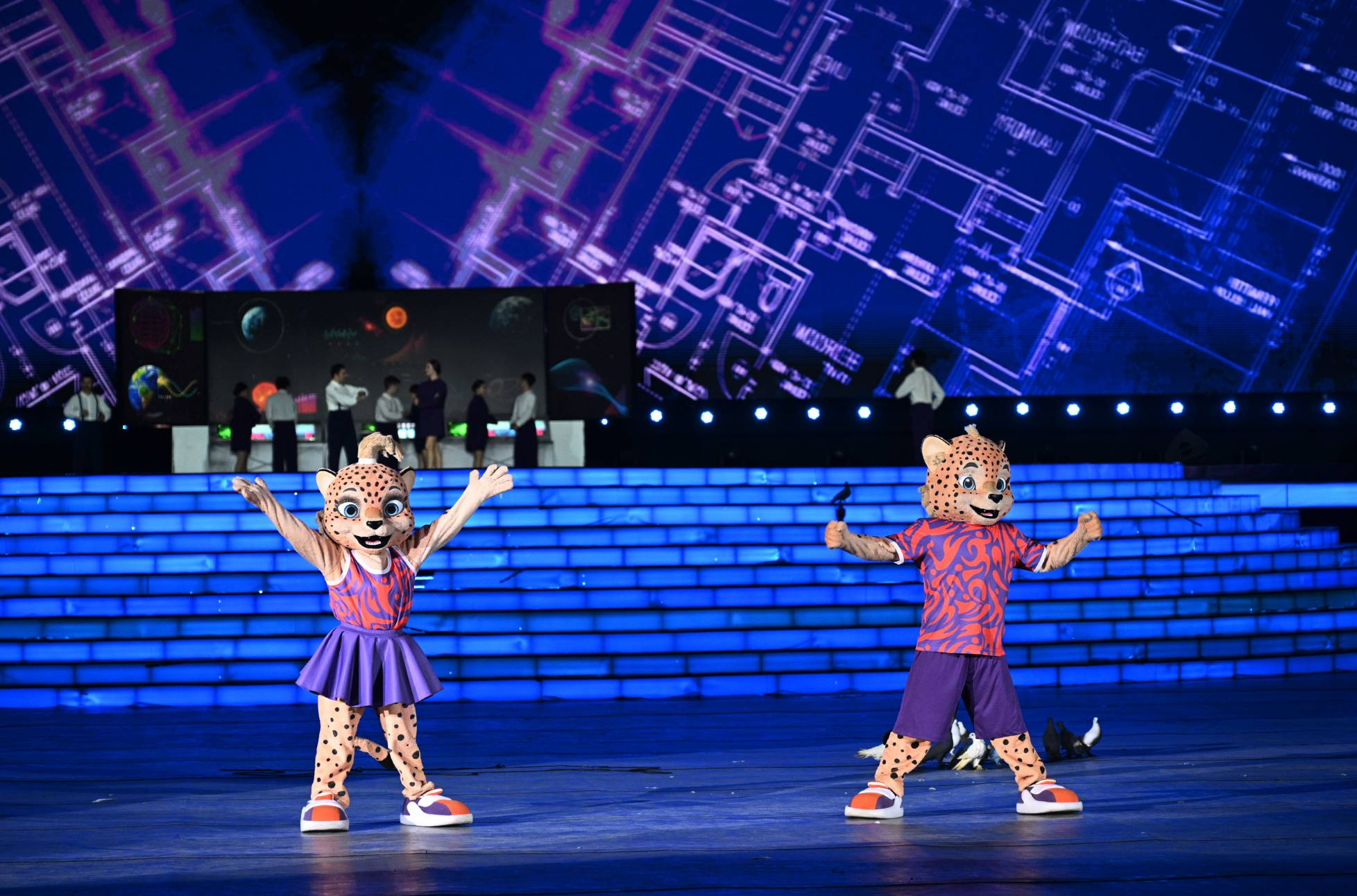
Opening ceremony
