= Leica Al Humaira Lubis =

Indonesian karateka

Personal information
- Born: 14 September 2004 (age 22) Medan, North Sumatra, Indonesia

Sport
- Country: Indonesia
- Sport: Karate
- Weight class: +68 kg
- Event: Kumite
Medal record
Women's karate
Representing Indonesia
Event	1st	2nd	3rd
Asian Games	0	0	1
Asian Karate Championships	1	0	0
SEA Games	1	0	0
Total	2	0	1
Asian Games
Bronze medal – third place	2026 Aichi-Nagoya	Kumite +68 kg
Asian Championships
Gold medal – first place	2026 Bali	Kumite +68 kg
SEA Games
Gold medal – first place	2025 Thailand	Kumite +68 kg

Leica Al Humaira Lubis (born 14 September 2004) is an Indonesian karateka. She won the gold medal in the women's +68 kg event at the 2026 Asian Karate Championships held in Bali, Indonesia. She won one of the bronze medals in the women's +68 kg event at the 2026 Asian Games held in Aichi and Nagoya, Japan.
