= BRICS Games =

Multi-sport event involving athletes from the BRICS+ Nations

BRICS - 10 members in 2025

The BRICS+ Games is a yearly multi-sport event organized by the BRICS countries. The event is generally organized by the country which chairs the group in the year.

== Background ==
After a preliminary under-17 association football BRICS tournament was held in Goa in 2016, the first multi-sport BRICS tournament was held in Guangzhou, China, in 2017. The first Games consisted of volleyball, wushu, and taolu sports.

The next games were held in 2018 in Johannesburg, consisting of men's and women's volleyball and women's association football.

They were not held in 2019 and 2020, due to the COVID-19 pandemic.

The 2021 BRICS Games were to be organized by India, and were supposed to be aligned with the Khelo India Games scheduled for the same year. This announcement was made by the Indian Minister of Sports and Youth Affairs, Kiren Rijiju, at the meeting of Sports Ministers of the BRICS nations. India held the chairmanship of the five-nation independent international group in 2021. The games were to be held during the same time and at the same venues as the Khelo India Games 2021, but in the end this did not no go ahead.

The 2022 event was organized by China, but could not be held in-person due to the county's policies relating to coronavirus.

The 2023 event was organized by South Africa in October and held in Durban.

Russia held the 2024 event in Kazan.

== Editions ==
BRICS Games Editions
Ed.	Date	Location	Sports	Ref.
Unofficial
0th	5–15 October 2016	Goa, India	Under-17 association football	
1st	17–21 June 2017	Guangzhou, China	Volleyball, wushu, taolu	
2nd	17–22 July 2018	Johannesburg, South Africa	Volleyball (men / women), association football (women)	
2019-2021 not held
3rd	1–30 September 2022	Online (China)	Breakdancing, chess, wushu	
4th	18–21 October 2023	Durban, South Africa	Swimming, badminton, table tennis, tennis, beach volleyball	
Official
1st (details)	12–23 June 2024	Kazan, Russia	27 Sports	
