= Karate at the 2022 Asian Games – Women's kumite +68 kg =

Women's kumite +68 kg at the 2022 Asian Games
- Venue: Linping Sports Centre Gymnasium
- Date: 7 October 2023
- Competitors: 8 from 8 nations

Medalists
| gold medal | Sofya Berultseva | Kazakhstan |
| silver medal | Arika Gurung | Nepal |
| bronze medal | Joud Al-Drous | Jordan |
| bronze medal | Yuzuki Sawae | Japan |

The women's kumite +68 kilograms competition at the 2022 Asian Games took place on 7 October 2023 at Linping Sports Centre Gymnasium, Hangzhou.

== Schedule ==
All times are China Standard Time (UTC+08:00)

| Date | Time | Event |
|---|---|---|
| Saturday, 7 October 2023 | 14:00 | Quarterfinals |
| Saturday, 7 October 2023 | 14:00 | Semifinals |
| Saturday, 7 October 2023 | 14:00 | Finals |

== Results ==
=== Main bracket ===
| Quarterfinals | | Semifinals | | Gold medal contest |
| Jung Hye-young (KOR) | 0 |
| Arianne Brito (PHI) | 3 | Arianne Brito (PHI) | 0 |
| Sofya Berultseva (KAZ) | 3 | Sofya Berultseva (KAZ) | 1 |
| Joud Al-Drous (JOR) | 0 | | | Sofya Berultseva (KAZ) | 3 |
| Arika Gurung (NEP) | 1 | | | Arika Gurung (NEP) | 0 |
| Yuzuki Sawae (JPN) | 1 | Arika Gurung (NEP) | 8 |
| Ho Kai Yan (HKG) | 2 | Ho Kai Yan (HKG) | 4 |
| Dessyinta Rakawuni Banurea (INA) | 0 |

=== Repechage ===
Bronze medal bouts
Joud Al-Drous (JOR) | 11
Arianne Brito (PHI) | 2
Yuzuki Sawae (JPN) | 7
Ho Kai Yan (HKG) | 0
