= Arika Gurung =

Nepalese karateka

Personal information
- Born: 30 May 2004 (age 22) Thapathali, Kathmandu
- Height: 5 ft 9 in (175 cm)

Sport
- Sport: Karate
- Club: Manamaiju Karate Do Academy
- Coached by: Kushal Shrestha; Niraj Maharjan
Medal record
Women's karate
Representing Nepal
Asian Games
| Silver medal – second place | 2022 Hangzhou | Kumite +68 kg |
Asian Championships
| Bronze medal – third place | 2026 Bali | Kumite +68 kg |

Arika Gurung (born 30 May 2004) is a Nepali karateka. She won the silver medal in the women's kumite +68 kg event at the 2022 Asian Games held in Hangzhou, China. She defeated Hong Kong's Yan Kai Ho 8–4 in the weight group above 68 kg for Kumute and entered in the final. Gurung's medal is the third silver medal won by Nepal in individual competition in the Asian Games after 25 years, and it is also the only silver medal won in the 19th Asian Games.

In 2024, Gurung won gold medal and silver medal in the US Open International Karate Championship 2024. Gurung was awarded Women's Player of the Year at NSJF Pulsar Sports Award 2080.

== Career ==
Arika Gurung made Nepal proud by clinching a gold medal at the Australian Open Karate Championship 2025. On June 3, 2025, Arika Gurung made history by winning Nepal's first-ever medal—a bronze—at the Karate-1 Premier League in Rabat, Morocco. Competing in the women's 68 kg+ kumite, she defeated France's Pia Clemence 6–2 in the repechage round. This was Nepal's debut in the elite global tournament and its biggest achievement in karate so far.
