= Salman Al-Mosawi =

Kuwaiti karateka (born 1995)

Sayed Salman Al Mosawi
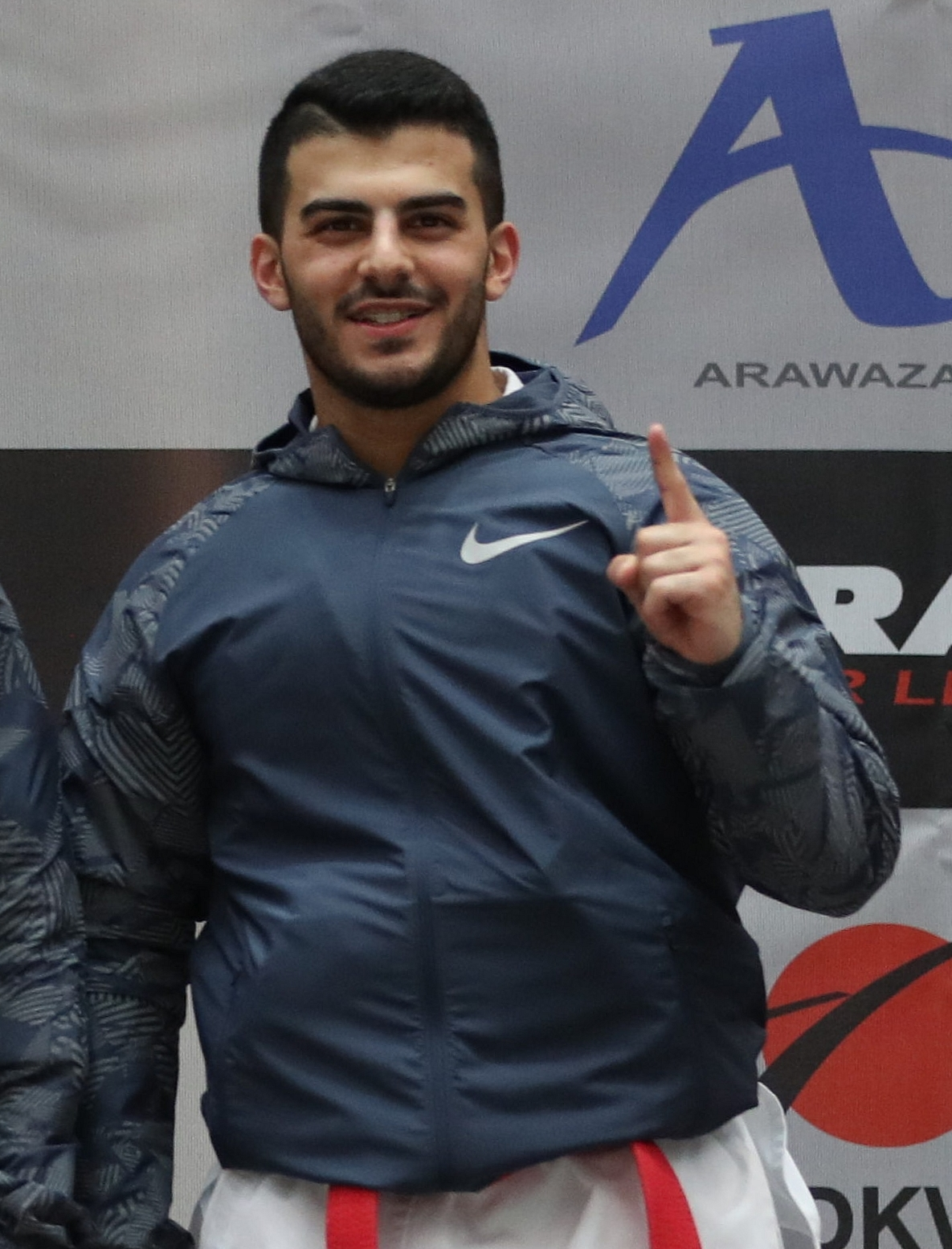
- Almosawi at the Karate1 Premier League (2018) in Berlin

Personal information
- Native name: سيد سلمان الموسوي
- Full name: Sayed Salman Al Mosawi
- National team: Kuwait
- Born: 12 May 1995 (age 31) Rumaithiya, Kuwait
- Education: American University of Kuwait (Bachelor of Electrical Engineering)
- Occupations: Karateka and electrical engineer
- Height: 166 cm (5 ft 5 in)
- Website: Official Instagram Profile

Sport
- Sport: Karate
- Event: Kata
- Club: Al-Yarmouk SC
- Partner: Mohammad Al-Mosawi
- Coached by: Seyed Alaedin Nekoofar

Achievements and titles
- World finals: 5th Position at the World Beach Games 2019
- Highest world ranking: 11th (WKF official ranking) September 2025
Medal record
Men's karate
Representing Kuwait
Asian Games
Bronze medal – third place	2023 Hangzhou	Individual kata
Bronze medal – third place	2023 Hangzhou	Team kata
Paris Open Karate
Bronze medal – third place	2022 Paris	Individual kata
Gold medal – first place	2022 Paris	Team kata
Asian Karate Championships
Silver medal – second place	2010 Hong Kong	Team kata
Bronze medal – third place	2010 Hong Kong	Individual kata
Gold medal – first place	2011 Quanzhou	Team kata
Bronze medal – third place	2012 Tashkent	Team kata
Bronze medal – third place	2013 Dubai	Team kata
Silver medal – second place	2014 Kuwait	Individual kata
Bronze medal – third place	2015 Yokohama	Team kata
Bronze medal – third place	2018 Amman	Individual kata
Bronze medal – third place	2018 Amman	Team kata
Bronze medal – third place	2019 Tashkent	Team kata
Bronze medal – third place	2021 Almaty	Team kata
Silver medal – second place	2022 Tashkent	Team kata
Silver medal – second place	2023 Melaka	Team kata
Silver medal – second place	2024 Hangzhou	Individual kata
Gold medal – first place	2024 Hangzhou	Team kata
Silver medal – second place	2025 Tashkent	Individual kata
Silver medal – second place	2025 Tashkent	Team kata
Silver medal – second place	2026 Bali	Team kata
Islamic Solidarity Games
Silver medal – second place	2013 Palembang	Team kata
Silver medal – second place	2022 Konya	Team kata
Arab Karate Championship
Gold medal – first place	2011 Marrakesh	Team kata
Bronze medal – third place	2019 Cairo	Individual kata
Gold medal – first place	2022 Cairo	Team kata
Silver medal – second place	2022 Cairo	Individual kata
GCC Karate Championship
Gold medal – first place	2006 Dubai	Individual kata (U-12)
Gold medal – first place	2006 Dubai	Team kata (U-12)
Gold medal – first place	2009 Bahrain	Team kata
West Asian Karate Championship
Gold medal – first place	2019 Sharjah	Team kata
World Cadet, Junior and U21 Karate Championships
Bronze medal – third place	2011 Melaka	Team kata
Karate1 Premier League
Bronze medal – third place	2013 Istanbul	Individual kata
Karate 1 Youth Cup
Bronze medal – third place	2015 Umag	Individual kata (U21)
Karate 1 Series A
Bronze medal – third place	2022 Cairo	Individual kata

Sayed Salman Al-Mosawi (Arabic: سيد سلمان الموسوي; born 12 May 1995) is a Kuwaiti karateka who competes in kata. He represents Kuwait in regional and international competitions, including the Asian Games, the Islamic Solidarity Games, the Arab Karate Championship, and various World Karate Federation (WKF) events. Al-Mosawi won a bronze medal in Team Kata at the 2011 World Junior and Cadet Karate Championships and has recorded top-five finishes at senior world competitions, including the 2019 World Beach Games and the 2023 World Karate Championships. He is the twin brother of fellow national-team karateka Mohammad Al-Mosawi. In 2013, the twins competed on the third season of Arabs Got Talent as the Karate Twins, advancing to the semifinals and gaining regional recognition.

== Early life and education ==
Salman Al Mosawi was born on 12 May 1995 to a judo player, Sayed Abdullah Almosawi in Rumaithiya, Kuwait. He began training in karate at a young age in 2003 with his coach Seyed Alaedin Nekoofar, and later joined the Kuwait national karate team, specialising in kata.

Alongside his twin brother Mohammed Al‑Mosawi, he has trained under coaches affiliated with the Al Yarmouk Sporting Club and represented Kuwait at major international competitions.

In 2013, Salman and his brother participated in the third season of the television talent show Arabs Got Talent, under the name "Karate Twins," advancing to the semifinals, and gaining the recognition in the region.

He completed his Bachelor's degree in Electrical Engineering from the American University of Kuwait.

== Career ==
Salman Al Mosawi has competed extensively across Asian and international karate circuits. He has won medals at the Asian Games and Asian Karate Championships in both individual and team kata events. He has also participated in WKF-sanctioned events, including Premier League and Series A tournaments.

=== Arab Karate Championship ===
At the 2022 Arab Karate Championship (Cairo) he contributed to Kuwait's only men's team-kata gold medal at the event; he also secured a silver medal in the individual kata.

In 2019, he won a bronze medal in the individual Kata and a Gold medal in 2011 in the team kata events in Cairo and Marrakesh respectively.

=== Asian Games ===
At the 19th Asian Games held in Hangzhou in 2023, Almosawi won the bronze medal in both the individual and men's team kata events.

=== Karate1 Premier League/ Series A (Individual) ===
He won a bronze medal in individual kata at the 2013 Karate1 Premier League in Istanbul, followed by another bronze at the 2015 Youth League (U21) event in Umag. In 2022, he added a further individual bronze medal at the Series A tournament held in Cairo.

World Championships and multi sport events

Al-Mosawi won a bronze medal in Team Kata at the 2011 World Cadet, Junior and U21 Karate Championships held in Melaka, marking his first medal at a WKF world-level championship.

In 2019, he finished fifth in Individual Kata at the World Beach Games in Doha.

At the 2023 World Karate Championships in Budapest, Al-Mosawi placed fifth in Team Kata, competing against senior national teams from around the world.

In 2025, he reached the top 16 in the individual kata category at the World Karate Championships in Cairo, Egypt.

Open tournaments

Al-Mosawi has also achieved notable success at the Paris Open Karate. At the 2022 edition, he won a bronze medal in individual kata and a gold medal in team kata, competing against elite international athletes.

Premier League and Series A (Team Kata)

Between 2015 and 2026, Al-Mosawi competed regularly in WKF Premier League and Series A Team Kata events, accumulating a total of 35 medals across these professional circuits:

- 16 gold medals
- 7 silver medals
- 12 bronze medals

== Personal life ==
Salman's twin brother, Sayed Mohammed Al-Mosawi, is also a competitive karateka for Kuwait. The pair are known colloquially as the "Karate Twins" in regional media.
