= 2018 Karate1 Premier League =

The Karate 1 – Premier League 2018 is a series of international karate competitions organized by the World Karate Federation (WKF) during the year 2018. The series consists of multiple stages held across different countries within the Premier League circuit and brings together top-level karate athletes from around the world competing in both kata and kumite disciplines.

This series is considered one of the most important events in international karate, as it contributes to the global ranking of athletes.

== Events ==
Karate 1 – Premier League 2018
Stages	Date	Series	City	Country
1	26–28 January 2018	Premier League – Paris	Paris	France
2	16–18 February 2018	Premier League – Dubai	Dubai	United Arab Emirates
3	16–18 March 2018	Premier League – Rotterdam	Rotterdam	Netherlands
4	6–8 April 2018	Premier League – Rabat	Rabat	Morocco
5	8–10 June 2018	Premier League – Istanbul	Istanbul	Turkey
6	14–16 September 2018	Premier League – Berlin	Berlin	Germany
7	12–14 October 2018	Premier League – Tokyo	Tokyo	Japan

== Karate1 Premier League - Paris 2018 ==
The Karate 1 Premier League – Paris 2018 was held on 26–28 January 2018 in Paris, France.

=== Men ===
Event	Gold	Silver	Bronze
Individual kata	Ryo Kiyuna; Japan	Wang Yi-ta; Chinese Taipei	Damián Quintero; Spain
Individual kata	Ryo Kiyuna; Japan	Wang Yi-ta; Chinese Taipei	Issei Shimbaba; Japan
Kumite -60 kg	Darkhan Assadilov; Kazakhstan	Douglas Brose; Brazil	Sadriddin Saymatov; Uzbekistan
Kumite -60 kg	Darkhan Assadilov; Kazakhstan	Douglas Brose; Brazil	Johan Lopes; France
Kumite -67 kg	Steven Da Costa; France	Hiroto Shinohara; Japan	Amir Khani; Belgium
Kumite -67 kg	Steven Da Costa; France	Hiroto Shinohara; Japan	Hamoon Derafshipour; Iran
Kumite -75 kg	Ken Nishimura; Japan	Rafael Aghayev; Azerbaijan	Bahman Asgari Ghoncheh; Iran
Kumite -75 kg	Ken Nishimura; Japan	Rafael Aghayev; Azerbaijan	Stanislav Horuna; Ukraine
Kumite -84 kg	Zabiollah Poorshab; Iran	Ahmed Elmasry; Egypt	Ugur Aktas; Turkey
Kumite -84 kg	Zabiollah Poorshab; Iran	Ahmed Elmasry; Egypt	Kenji Grillon; France
Kumite +84 kg	Sajad Ganjzadeh; Iran	Mehdi Filali; France	Saleh Abazari; Iran
Kumite +84 kg	Sajad Ganjzadeh; Iran	Mehdi Filali; France	Jonathan Horne; Germany
Team kata	Spain; Jose Manuel Carbonell Lopez; Sergio Galan Lopez; Francisco Jose Salazar Jover	Morocco; Mohammed El Hanni; Adnane El Hakimi; Bilal Benkacem	WKF; Mohammad Husain; Sayed Salman Almosawi; Sayed Mohammed Almosawi
Team kata	Spain; Jose Manuel Carbonell Lopez; Sergio Galan Lopez; Francisco Jose Salazar Jover	Morocco; Mohammed El Hanni; Adnane El Hakimi; Bilal Benkacem	Iran; Abolfazl Shahrjerdi; Milad Delikhoun; Ali Zand

=== Women ===
Event	Gold	Silver	Bronze
Individual kata	Kiyou Shimizu; Japan	Emiri Iwamoto; Japan	Sandra Sanchez; Spain
Individual kata	Kiyou Shimizu; Japan	Emiri Iwamoto; Japan	Grace Lau; Hong Kong
Kumite -50 kg	Miho Miyahara; Japan	Alexandra Recchia; France	Radwa Sayed; Egypt
Kumite -50 kg	Miho Miyahara; Japan	Alexandra Recchia; France	Shannon Nishi; United States
Kumite -55 kg	Syakilla Salni Jefry Krishnan; Malaysia	Sabrina Ouhaddadene; France	Anzhelika Terliuga; Ukraine
Kumite -55 kg	Syakilla Salni Jefry Krishnan; Malaysia	Sabrina Ouhaddadene; France	Travat Khaksar; Iran
Kumite -61 kg	Yin Xiaoyan; China	Gwendoline Philippe; France	Leila Heurtault; France
Kumite -61 kg	Yin Xiaoyan; China	Gwendoline Philippe; France	Lucie Ignace; France
Kumite -68 kg	Alizée Agier; France	Kayo Someya; Japan	Miroslava Kopunova; Slovakia
Kumite -68 kg	Alizée Agier; France	Kayo Someya; Japan	Cristina Vizcaíno González; Spain
Kumite +68 kg	Nadège Ait-Ibrahim; France	Nancy Garcia; France	Amelia Harvey; England
Kumite +68 kg	Nadège Ait-Ibrahim; France	Nancy Garcia; France	Chahnez Jami; Tunisia
Team kata	Japan; Azuki Ogawa; Yui Umekage; Natsuki Shimizu	Spain; Marta Garcia Lozano; Lidia Rodriguez Encabo; Raquel Roy Rubio	Italy; Sofia Garofoli; Elisa Franchini; Eva Ferracuti
Team kata	Japan; Azuki Ogawa; Yui Umekage; Natsuki Shimizu	Spain; Marta Garcia Lozano; Lidia Rodriguez Encabo; Raquel Roy Rubio	Morocco; Lamiae Bertali; Sanae Agalmame; Aya En-Nesyry

== Karate1 Premier League - Dubai 2018 ==
The Karate 1 Premier League – Dubai 2018 was held on 16–18 February 2018 in Dubai, United Arab Emirates.

=== Men ===
Event	Gold	Silver	Bronze
Individual kata	Damián Quintero; Spain	Ryo Kiyuna; Japan	Abolfazl Shahrjerdi; Iran
Individual kata	Damián Quintero; Spain	Ryo Kiyuna; Japan	Ali Sofuoglu; Turkey
Kumite -60 kg	Eray Samdan; Turkey	Emil Pavlov; North Macedonia	Kalvis Kalnins; Latvia
Kumite -60 kg	Eray Samdan; Turkey	Emil Pavlov; North Macedonia	Sadriddin Saymatov; Uzbekistan
Kumite -67 kg	Marvin Garin; France	Burak Uygur; Turkey	Yves Martial Tadissi; Hungary
Kumite -67 kg	Marvin Garin; France	Burak Uygur; Turkey	Amir Reza Mirzaei; Iran
Kumite -75 kg	Rafael Aghayev; Azerbaijan	Gabor Harspataki; Hungary	Stanislav Horuna; Ukraine
Kumite -75 kg	Rafael Aghayev; Azerbaijan	Gabor Harspataki; Hungary	Ali Asghar Asiabari; Iran
Kumite -84 kg	Ahmed Elmasry; Egypt	Ali Fadakar; Iran	Aykhan Mamayev; Azerbaijan
Kumite -84 kg	Ahmed Elmasry; Egypt	Ali Fadakar; Iran	Valerii Chobotar; Ukraine
Kumite +84 kg	Enes Erkan; Turkey	Andrei Grinevich; Belarus	Daniel Molnar; Hungary
Kumite +84 kg	Enes Erkan; Turkey	Andrei Grinevich; Belarus	Tareg Hamedi; Saudi Arabia
Team kata	WKF; Sayed Mohammed Almosawi; Sayed Salman Almosawi; Mohammad Husain	Turkey; Kutluhan Duran; Gokay Ilgezdi; Emre Vefa Goktas	United Arab Emirates; Marwan AlMaazmi; Khalifa AlAbbar; Amin AlAwadhi
Team kata	WKF; Sayed Mohammed Almosawi; Sayed Salman Almosawi; Mohammad Husain	Turkey; Kutluhan Duran; Gokay Ilgezdi; Emre Vefa Goktas	Morocco; Bilal Benkacem; Adnan El Hakimi; Mohammed El Hanni

=== Women ===
Event	Gold	Silver	Bronze
Individual kata	Sandra Sanchez; Spain	Grace Lau; Hong Kong	Kiyou Shimizu; Japan
Individual kata	Sandra Sanchez; Spain	Grace Lau; Hong Kong	Hikaru Ono; Japan
Kumite -55 kg	Sara Cardin; Italy	Jana Bitsch; Germany	Wen Tzu-yun; Chinese Taipei
Kumite -55 kg	Sara Cardin; Italy	Jana Bitsch; Germany	Yassmin Attia; Egypt
Kumite -61 kg	Yin Xiaoyan; China	Jovana Prekovic; Serbia	Cristina Ferrer; Spain
Kumite -61 kg	Yin Xiaoyan; China	Jovana Prekovic; Serbia	Alexandra Grande; Peru
Kumite -68 kg	Alizée Agier; France	Halyna Melnyk; Ukraine	Inga Sherozia; Russia
Kumite -68 kg	Alizée Agier; France	Halyna Melnyk; Ukraine	Cristina Vizcaíno González; Spain
Kumite +68 kg	Ayumi Uekusa; Japan	Anne-Laure Florentin; France	Guadalupe Quintal; Mexico
Kumite +68 kg	Ayumi Uekusa; Japan	Anne-Laure Florentin; France	Hamideh Abbasali; Iran
Team kata	Turkey; Dilara Eltemur; Gizem Sofuoglu; Rabia Kusmus	United Arab Emirates; Hamida Haji; Ivana Stepanovic; Viviane Ambani	Iran; Ghazale Movagharnia; Hanieh Azizi Ghoomi; Nasim Afshar Kaveh

== Karate1 Premier League - Rotterdam 2018 ==
The Karate 1 Premier League – Rotterdam 2018 was held on 16–18 March 2018 in Rotterdam, Netherlands.

=== Men ===
Event	Gold	Silver	Bronze
Individual kata	Issei Shimbaba; Japan	Antonio Díaz; Venezuela	Damian Quintero; Spain
Individual kata	Issei Shimbaba; Japan	Antonio Díaz; Venezuela	Wang Yi-Ta; Chinese Taipei
Kumite -60 kg	Eray Şamdan; Turkey	Aykut Kaya; Turkey	Firdovsi Farzaliyev; Azerbaijan
Kumite -60 kg	Eray Şamdan; Turkey	Aykut Kaya; Turkey	Douglas Brose; Brazil
Kumite -67 kg	Burak Uygur; Turkey	Stefan Pokorny; Austria	Luigi Busà; Italy
Kumite -67 kg	Burak Uygur; Turkey	Stefan Pokorny; Austria	Omer Kemaloğlu; Turkey
Kumite -75 kg	Ken Nishimura; Japan	Bahman Asgari; Iran	Logan Da Costa; France
Kumite -75 kg	Ken Nishimura; Japan	Bahman Asgari; Iran	Rafael Aghayev; Azerbaijan
Kumite -84 kg	Uğur Aktas; Turkey	Mohamed Elkotby; France	Aykhan Mamayev; Azerbaijan
Kumite -84 kg	Uğur Aktas; Turkey	Mohamed Elkotby; France	Ryutaro Araga; Japan
Kumite +84 kg	Jonathan Horne; Germany	Moreno Sheppard; Netherlands	Mehdi Filali; France
Kumite +84 kg	Jonathan Horne; Germany	Moreno Sheppard; Netherlands	Ridvan Kaptan; Turkey
Team Kata	Italy; Alessandro Iodice; Gianluca Gallo; Giuseppe Panagia	Iran; Soheil Sajedi-Far; Roozbeh Roshani; Amirbahador Tadayon	Turkey; Kutluhan Duran; Emre Vefa Goktas; Ali Sofuoglu
Team Kata	Italy; Alessandro Iodice; Gianluca Gallo; Giuseppe Panagia	Iran; Soheil Sajedi-Far; Roozbeh Roshani; Amirbahador Tadayon	Montenegro; Srdjan Vukovic; Mijat Vojvodic; Vladimir Mijac

=== Women ===
Event	Gold	Silver	Bronze
Individual kata	Sandra Sánchez; Spain	Emiri Iwamoto; Japan	Grace Lau; Hong Kong
Individual kata	Sandra Sánchez; Spain	Emiri Iwamoto; Japan	Hikaru Ono; Japan
Kumite -50 kg	Ayaka Tadano; Japan	Srunita Sari Sukatendel; Indonesia	Elena Stepanova; Russia
Kumite -50 kg	Ayaka Tadano; Japan	Srunita Sari Sukatendel; Indonesia	Serap Özçelik; Turkey
Kumite -55 kg	Wen Tzu-Yun; Chinese Taipei	Tuba Yakan; Turkey	Sara Yamada; Japan
Kumite -55 kg	Wen Tzu-Yun; Chinese Taipei	Tuba Yakan; Turkey	Anzhelika Terliuga; Ukraine
Kumite -61 kg	Gwendoline Philippe; France	Merve Çoban; Turkey	Anita Serogina; Ukraine
Kumite -61 kg	Gwendoline Philippe; France	Merve Çoban; Turkey	Thi Ngoan Nguyen; Vietnam
Kumite -68 kg	Johanna Kneer; Germany	Miroslava Kopunova; Slovakia	Halyna Melnyk; Ukraine
Kumite -68 kg	Johanna Kneer; Germany	Miroslava Kopunova; Slovakia	Lea Avazeri; France
Kumite +68 kg	Ayumi Uekusa; Japan	Hamideh Abbasali; Iran	Ingrid Creemers; Netherlands
Kumite +68 kg	Ayumi Uekusa; Japan	Hamideh Abbasali; Iran	Melissa Bratic; Canada
Team Kata	Spain; Marta Garcia-Lozano; Lidia Rodriguez Encabo; Raquel Roy Rubio	Germany; Sophie Wachter; Christine Heinrich; Jasmin Juettner	Turkey; Gizem Sofuoglu; Dilara Eltemur; Rabia Kusmus
Team Kata	Spain; Marta Garcia-Lozano; Lidia Rodriguez Encabo; Raquel Roy Rubio	Germany; Sophie Wachter; Christine Heinrich; Jasmin Juettner	Malaysia; Sin Yi Chang; Yee Voon Khaw; Celine Xin Yi Lee

== Karate1 Premier League - Rabat 2018 ==
The Karate 1 Premier League – Rabat 2018 was held on 6–8 April 2018 in Rabat, Morocco.

=== Men ===
Event	Gold	Silver	Bronze
Individual kata	Ali Sofuoglu; Turkey	Sergio Galan Lopez; Spain	Mehmet Yakan; Turkey
Individual kata	Ali Sofuoglu; Turkey	Sergio Galan Lopez; Spain	Wang Yi-ta; Chinese Taipei
Kumite -60 kg	Sadriddin Saymatov; Uzbekistan	Douglas Brose; Brazil	Kaisar Alpysbay; Kazakhstan
Kumite -60 kg	Sadriddin Saymatov; Uzbekistan	Douglas Brose; Brazil	Aykut Kaya; Turkey
Kumite -67 kg	Ali Elsawy; Egypt	Magdy Mamdouh Hanafy; Egypt	Tural Aghalarzade; Azerbaijan
Kumite -67 kg	Ali Elsawy; Egypt	Magdy Mamdouh Hanafy; Egypt	Yves Martial Tadissi; Hungary
Kumite -75 kg	Rafael Aghayev; Azerbaijan	Dastonbek Otabolaev; Uzbekistan	Gabor Harspataki; Hungary
Kumite -75 kg	Rafael Aghayev; Azerbaijan	Dastonbek Otabolaev; Uzbekistan	Thomas Scott; United States
Kumite -84 kg	Ahmed Elmasry; Egypt	Mohamed El Kotby; Egypt	Alvin Karaqi; Kosovo
Kumite -84 kg	Ahmed Elmasry; Egypt	Mohamed El Kotby; Egypt	Ivan Kvesic; Croatia
Kumite +84 kg	Mehdi Filali; France	Jonathan Horne; Germany	Daniel Molnar; Hungary
Kumite +84 kg	Mehdi Filali; France	Jonathan Horne; Germany	Shahin Atamov; Azerbaijan
Team kata	Morocco; Bilal Benkacem; Adnan El Hakimi; Mohammed El Hanni	Malaysia; Ivan Oh Theng Wei; Emmanuel Leong; Thomson Hoe	Spain; Francisco Jose Salazar Jover; Sergio Galan Lopez; Jose Manuel Carbonell Lopez
Team kata	Morocco; Bilal Benkacem; Adnan El Hakimi; Mohammed El Hanni	Malaysia; Ivan Oh Theng Wei; Emmanuel Leong; Thomson Hoe	Turkey; Ali Sofuoglu; Emre Vefa Goktas; Kutluhan Duran

=== Women ===
Event	Gold	Silver	Bronze
Individual kata	Grace Lau Mo Sheung; Hong Kong	Sandra Sanchez Jaime; Spain	Yaiza Martin Abello; Spain
Individual kata	Grace Lau Mo Sheung; Hong Kong	Sandra Sanchez Jaime; Spain	Dilara Eltemur; Turkey
Kumite -50 kg	Miho Miyahara; Japan	Khaoula Ouhammad; Morocco	Alexandra Recchia; France
Kumite -50 kg	Miho Miyahara; Japan	Khaoula Ouhammad; Morocco	Serap Ozcelik Arapoglu; Turkey
Kumite -55 kg	Valeria Kumizaki; Brazil	Carla Burkitt; England	Aleksandra Hasani; Croatia
Kumite -55 kg	Valeria Kumizaki; Brazil	Carla Burkitt; England	Syakilla Salni Jefry Krishnan; Malaysia
Kumite -61 kg	Leila Heurtault; France	Xiaoyan Yin; China	Boutheina Hasnaoui; Tunisia
Kumite -61 kg	Leila Heurtault; France	Xiaoyan Yin; China	Gwendoline Philippe; France
Kumite -68 kg	Katrine Pedersen; Denmark	Iryna Zaretska; Azerbaijan	Miroslava Kopunova; Slovakia
Kumite -68 kg	Katrine Pedersen; Denmark	Iryna Zaretska; Azerbaijan	Hafsa Seyda Burucu; Turkey
Kumite 68+ kg	Titta Keinanen; Finland	Laura Palacio Gonzalez; Spain	Sohila Abouismail; Egypt
Kumite 68+ kg	Titta Keinanen; Finland	Laura Palacio Gonzalez; Spain	Meltem Hocaoglu; Turkey
Team kata	Turkey; Gizem Sofuoglu; Dilara Eltemur; Rabia Kusmus	Morocco; Aya En-Nesyry; Sanae Agalmame; Lamiae Bertali	Italy; Terryana D'Onofrio; Michele Pezzetti; Sara Battaglia
Team kata	Turkey; Gizem Sofuoglu; Dilara Eltemur; Rabia Kusmus	Morocco; Aya En-Nesyry; Sanae Agalmame; Lamiae Bertali	Spain; Lidia Rodriguez Encabo; Marta Garcia Lozano; Raquel Roy Rubio

== Karate1 Premier League - Istanbul 2018 ==
The Karate 1 Premier League – Istanbul 2018 was held on 8–10 June 2018 in Istanbul, Turkey.

=== Men ===
Event	Gold	Silver	Bronze
Individual kata	Ryo Kiyuna; Japan	Kazumasa Moto; Japan	Takuya Uemura; Japan
Individual kata	Ryo Kiyuna; Japan	Kazumasa Moto; Japan	Damián Quintero; Spain
Kumite -60 kg	Amir Mehdizadeh; Iran	Eray Samdan; Turkey	Darkhan Assadilov; Kazakhstan
Kumite -60 kg	Amir Mehdizadeh; Iran	Eray Samdan; Turkey	Nenad Dulovic; Montenegro
Kumite -67 kg	Hiroto Gomyō; Japan	Seyedali Karimi; Iran	Amirali Didar; Kazakhstan
Kumite -67 kg	Hiroto Gomyō; Japan	Seyedali Karimi; Iran	Amir Reza Mirzaei Fashtali; Iran
Kumite -75 kg	Stanislav Horuna; Ukraine	Bahman Asgari Ghoncheh; Iran	Erman Eltemur; Turkey
Kumite -75 kg	Stanislav Horuna; Ukraine	Bahman Asgari Ghoncheh; Iran	Daisuke Watanabe; Japan
Kumite -84 kg	Mahdi Khodabakhshi; Iran	Berat Jakupi; North Macedonia	Zabiollah Poorshab; Iran
Kumite -84 kg	Mahdi Khodabakhshi; Iran	Berat Jakupi; North Macedonia	Georgios Tzanos; Greece
Kumite +84 kg	Saleh Abazari; Iran	Tyron-Darnell Lardy; Netherlands	Andjelo Kvesic; Croatia
Kumite +84 kg	Saleh Abazari; Iran	Tyron-Darnell Lardy; Netherlands	Saman Heydari; Iran
Team kata	Morocco; Bilal Benkacem; Adnan El Hakimi; Mohammed El Hanni	Turkey; Ali Sofuoglu; Emre Vefa Goktas; Kutluhan Duran	Iran; Abolfazl Shahrjerdi; Milad Delikhoun; Ali Zand
Team kata	Morocco; Bilal Benkacem; Adnan El Hakimi; Mohammed El Hanni	Turkey; Ali Sofuoglu; Emre Vefa Goktas; Kutluhan Duran	WKF; Mohammad Husain; Sayed Salman Almosawi; Sayed Mohammed Almosawi

=== Women ===
Event	Gold	Silver	Bronze
Individual kata	Viviana Bottaro; Italy	Kiyou Shimizu; Japan	Emiri Iwamoto; Japan
Individual kata	Viviana Bottaro; Italy	Kiyou Shimizu; Japan	Sandra Sanchez Jaime; Spain
Kumite -50 kg	Shiau-Shuang Gu; Chinese Taipei	Bakhriniso Babaeva; Uzbekistan	Bettina Plank; Austria
Kumite -50 kg	Shiau-Shuang Gu; Chinese Taipei	Bakhriniso Babaeva; Uzbekistan	Kateryna Kryva; Ukraine
Kumite -55 kg	Sara Cardin; Italy	Tzu-Yun Wen; Chinese Taipei	Jana Bitsch; Germany
Kumite -55 kg	Sara Cardin; Italy	Tzu-Yun Wen; Chinese Taipei	Travat Khaksar; Iran
Kumite -61 kg	Merve Coban; Turkey	Alisa Buchinger; Austria	Madina Yertelbayeva; Kazakhstan
Kumite -61 kg	Merve Coban; Turkey	Alisa Buchinger; Austria	Ayami Moriguchi; Japan
Kumite -68 kg	Elena Quirici; Switzerland	Mizuki Kikuchi; Japan	Feryal Abdelaziz; Egypt
Kumite -68 kg	Elena Quirici; Switzerland	Mizuki Kikuchi; Japan	Cristina Vizcaino Gonzalez; Spain
Kumite 68+ kg	Titta Keinanen; Finland	Meltem Hocaoglu; Turkey	Clio Ferracuti; Italy
Kumite 68+ kg	Titta Keinanen; Finland	Meltem Hocaoglu; Turkey	Ayaka Saito; Japan
Team kata	Turkey; Dilara Eltemur; Gizem Sofuoglu; Rabia Kusmus	Italy; Sara D'Agostini; Valeria Bernardi; Noemi Nicosanti	Iran; Elnaz Taghipour; Najmeh Sabagh Ghazizadeh; Shadi Jafarizadeh
Team kata	Turkey; Dilara Eltemur; Gizem Sofuoglu; Rabia Kusmus	Italy; Sara D'Agostini; Valeria Bernardi; Noemi Nicosanti	Iran; Zohreh Mirzakhanian; Fatemeh Chizari; Maryam Karimi-Khouzani

== Karate1 Premier League - Berlin 2018 ==
The Karate 1 Premier League – Berlin 2018 was held on 14–16 September 2018 in Berlin, Germany.

=== Men ===
Event	Gold	Silver	Bronze
Individual kata	Ryo Kiyuna; Japan	Issei Shimbaba; Japan	Ali Sofuoglu; Turkey
Individual kata	Ryo Kiyuna; Japan	Issei Shimbaba; Japan	Damián Quintero Capdevila; Spain
Kumite -60 kg	Angelo Crescenzo; Italy	Yugo Kozaki; Japan	Firdovsi Farzaliyev; Azerbaijan
Kumite -60 kg	Angelo Crescenzo; Italy	Yugo Kozaki; Japan	Amir Mehdizadeh; Iran
Kumite -67 kg	Luca Maresca; Italy	Vinicius Figueira; Brazil	Steven Da Costa; France
Kumite -67 kg	Luca Maresca; Italy	Vinicius Figueira; Brazil	Hiroto Shinohara; Japan
Kumite -75 kg	Yusei Sakiyama; Japan	Rafael Aghayev; Azerbaijan	Thomas Scott; United States
Kumite -75 kg	Yusei Sakiyama; Japan	Rafael Aghayev; Azerbaijan	Ken Nishimura; Japan
Kumite -84 kg	Ryutaro Araga; Japan	Daniyar Yuldashev; Kazakhstan	Timothy Petersen; Netherlands
Kumite -84 kg	Ryutaro Araga; Japan	Daniyar Yuldashev; Kazakhstan	Zabiollah Poorshab; Iran
Kumite +84 kg	Sajad Ganjzadeh; Iran	Gogita Arkania; Georgia	Andjelo Kvesic; Croatia
Kumite +84 kg	Sajad Ganjzadeh; Iran	Gogita Arkania; Georgia	Jonathan Horne; Germany
Team kata	WKF; Mohammad Husain; Sayed Salman Almosawi; Sayed Mohammed Almosawi	Spain; Jose Manuel Carbonell Lopez; Francisco Jose Salazar Jover; Sergio Galan Lopez	Turkey; Gokay Ilgezdi; Emre Vefa Goktas; Kutluhan Duran
Team kata	WKF; Mohammad Husain; Sayed Salman Almosawi; Sayed Mohammed Almosawi	Spain; Jose Manuel Carbonell Lopez; Francisco Jose Salazar Jover; Sergio Galan Lopez	Italy; Gianluca Gallo; Alessandro Iodice; Giuseppe Panagia

=== Women ===
Event	Gold	Silver	Bronze
Individual kata	Kiyou Shimizu; Japan	Sandra Sanchez Jaime; Spain	Emiri Iwamoto; Japan
Individual kata	Kiyou Shimizu; Japan	Sandra Sanchez Jaime; Spain	Viviana Bottaro; Italy
Kumite -50 kg	Serap Ozcelik Arapoglu; Turkey	Ayaka Tadano; Japan	Chinatsu Endo; Japan
Kumite -50 kg	Serap Ozcelik Arapoglu; Turkey	Ayaka Tadano; Japan	Radwa Sayed; Egypt
Kumite -55 kg	Anzhelika Terliuga; Ukraine	Li Lirisman; Estonia	Sara Cardin; Italy
Kumite -55 kg	Anzhelika Terliuga; Ukraine	Li Lirisman; Estonia	Jenna Brown; United States
Kumite -61 kg	Alexandra Grande; Peru	Leila Heurtault; France	Gwendoline Philippe; France
Kumite -61 kg	Alexandra Grande; Peru	Leila Heurtault; France	Haya Jumaa; Canada
Kumite -68 kg	Eda Eltemur; Turkey	Iryna Zaretska; Azerbaijan	Silvia Semeraro; Italy
Kumite -68 kg	Eda Eltemur; Turkey	Iryna Zaretska; Azerbaijan	Kayo Someya; Japan
Kumite 68+ kg	Ayumi Uekusa; Japan	Clio Ferracuti; Italy	Ayaka Saito; Japan
Kumite 68+ kg	Ayumi Uekusa; Japan	Clio Ferracuti; Italy	Laura Palacio Gonzalez; Spain
Team kata	Italy; Sara Battaglia; Carola Casale; Michela Pezzetti	Russia; Polina Kotlyarova; Irina Troitskaya; Mariya Zotova	Spain; Raquel Roy Rubio; Lidia Rodriguez Encabo; Marta Garcia Lozano
Team kata	Italy; Sara Battaglia; Carola Casale; Michela Pezzetti	Russia; Polina Kotlyarova; Irina Troitskaya; Mariya Zotova	Austria; Verena Koefinger; Funda Celo; Kristin Wieninger

== Karate1 Premier League - Tokyo 2018 ==
The Karate 1 Premier League – Tokyo 2018 was held on 12–14 October 2018 in Tokyo, Japan.

=== Men ===
Event	Gold	Silver	Bronze
Individual kata	Ryo Kiyuna; Japan	Kazumasa Moto; Japan	Yuhei Horiba; Japan
Individual kata	Ryo Kiyuna; Japan	Kazumasa Moto; Japan	Issei Shimbaba; Japan
Kumite -60 kg	Eray Samdan; Turkey	Kajith Kanagasingam; France	Mattia Pampaloni; Italy
Kumite -60 kg	Eray Samdan; Turkey	Kajith Kanagasingam; France	Ihor Uhnich; Ukraine
Kumite -67 kg	Burak Uygur; Turkey	Hiroto Shinohara; Japan	Ikboljon Uzakov; Uzbekistan
Kumite -67 kg	Burak Uygur; Turkey	Hiroto Shinohara; Japan	Yves Martial Tadissi; Hungary
Kumite -75 kg	Luigi Busa; Italy	Yuta Mori; Japan	Ken Nishimura; Japan
Kumite -75 kg	Luigi Busa; Italy	Yuta Mori; Japan	Gabor Harspataki; Hungary
Kumite -84 kg	Ugur Aktas; Turkey	Rikito Shimada; Japan	Ivan Kvesic; Croatia
Kumite -84 kg	Ugur Aktas; Turkey	Rikito Shimada; Japan	Igor Chikhmarev; Kazakhstan
Kumite +84 kg	Hideyoshi Kagawa; Japan	Gogita Arkania; Georgia	Daniel Molnar; Hungary
Kumite +84 kg	Hideyoshi Kagawa; Japan	Gogita Arkania; Georgia	Ilyes Klouz; France
Team kata	Japan; Takuya Uemura; Arata Kinjo; Ryo Kiyuna	Japan; Ryuji Moto; Kazumasa Moto; Koji Arimoto	Japan; Takeru Sasaoka; Kanta Matsumoto; Futa Matsumoto
Team kata	Japan; Takuya Uemura; Arata Kinjo; Ryo Kiyuna	Japan; Ryuji Moto; Kazumasa Moto; Koji Arimoto	Italy; Alessandro Iodice; Gianluca Gallo; Giuseppe Panagia

=== Women ===
Event	Gold	Silver	Bronze
Individual kata	Kiyou Shimizu; Japan	Sandra Sanchez Jaime; Spain	Mizuki Ugai; Japan
Individual kata	Kiyou Shimizu; Japan	Sandra Sanchez Jaime; Spain	Mirisa Ohuchi; Japan
Kumite -50 kg	Miho Miyahara; Japan	Gema Morales Ozuna; Spain	Shara Hubrich; Germany
Kumite -50 kg	Miho Miyahara; Japan	Gema Morales Ozuna; Spain	Ayaka Tadano; Japan
Kumite -55 kg	Shiori Nakamura; Japan	Sabina Zakharova; Kazakhstan	Jana Bitsch; Germany
Kumite -55 kg	Shiori Nakamura; Japan	Sabina Zakharova; Kazakhstan	Sabrina Ouihaddadene; France
Kumite -61 kg	Gwendoline Philippe; France	Alexandra Grande; Peru	Jovana Prekovic; Serbia
Kumite -61 kg	Gwendoline Philippe; France	Alexandra Grande; Peru	Mayumi Someya; Japan
Kumite -68 kg	Alizée Agier; France	Elena Quirici; Switzerland	Silvia Semeraro; Italy
Kumite -68 kg	Alizée Agier; France	Elena Quirici; Switzerland	Halyna Melnyk; Ukraine
Kumite 68+ kg	Nancy Garcia; France	Ayumi Uekusa; Japan	Clio Ferracuti; Italy
Kumite 68+ kg	Nancy Garcia; France	Ayumi Uekusa; Japan	Natsumi Kawamura; Japan
Team kata	Japan; Yui Umekage; Natsuki Shimizu; Azuki Ogawa	Japan; Urara Kokubo; Arisa Gibo; Aira Minamoto	Japan; Mao Yasui; Akari Igawa; Ayaka Takeshita
Team kata	Japan; Yui Umekage; Natsuki Shimizu; Azuki Ogawa	Japan; Urara Kokubo; Arisa Gibo; Aira Minamoto	Italy; Terryana D'Onofrio; Sara Battaglia; Michela Pezzetti
