= 2022 Asian Karate Championships =

Karate competition

- Host city: Tashkent, Uzbekistan
- Dates: 18–20 December 2022
- Main venue: Sport Complex Uzbekistan

The 2022 Asian Karate Championships were the 18th edition of the Senior Asian Karate Championship and were held in Tashkent, Uzbekistan from 18 to 20, December 2022. The event was held at the Sport Complex Uzbekistan.

== Medalists ==
=== Men ===
Event	Gold	Silver	Bronze
Individual kata	Kakeru Nishiyama; Japan	Ahmad Zigi Zaresta Yuda; Indonesia	Park Hee-jun; South Korea
Individual kata	Kakeru Nishiyama; Japan	Ahmad Zigi Zaresta Yuda; Indonesia	Ali Zand; Iran
Team kata	Japan; Arata Kinjo; Ryo Kiyuna; Takuya Uemura	Kuwait; Mohammad Al-Mosawi; Salman Al-Mosawi; Mohammad Bader	Iran; Milad Farazmehr; Abolfazl Shahrjerdi; Ali Zand
Team kata	Japan; Arata Kinjo; Ryo Kiyuna; Takuya Uemura	Kuwait; Mohammad Al-Mosawi; Salman Al-Mosawi; Mohammad Bader	Indonesia; Albiadi; Andi Dharmawan; Andi Tomy Aditya Mardana
Kumite −55 kg	Omar Shaqrah; Jordan	Nizamiddin Khalmatov; Kazakhstan	Prem Kumar Selvam; Malaysia
Kumite −55 kg	Omar Shaqrah; Jordan	Nizamiddin Khalmatov; Kazakhstan	Fahed Al-Ajmi; Kuwait
Kumite −60 kg	Abdullah Shaaban; Kuwait	Abdallah Hammad; Jordan	Hiromu Hashimoto; Japan
Kumite −60 kg	Abdullah Shaaban; Kuwait	Abdallah Hammad; Jordan	Ali Meskini; Iran
Kumite −67 kg	Abdelrahman Al-Masatfa; Jordan	Yugo Kozaki; Japan	Didar Amirali; Kazakhstan
Kumite −67 kg	Abdelrahman Al-Masatfa; Jordan	Yugo Kozaki; Japan	Sadriddin Saymatov; Uzbekistan
Kumite −75 kg	Hasan Masarweh; Jordan	Sultan Al-Zahrani; Saudi Arabia	Nurkanat Azhikanov; Kazakhstan
Kumite −75 kg	Hasan Masarweh; Jordan	Sultan Al-Zahrani; Saudi Arabia	Omar Al-Jenaei; Kuwait
Kumite −84 kg	Mohammad Al-Jafari; Jordan	Faraj Al-Nashri; Saudi Arabia	Arif Afifuddin; Malaysia
Kumite −84 kg	Mohammad Al-Jafari; Jordan	Faraj Al-Nashri; Saudi Arabia	Ahmad Al-Ali; Kuwait
Kumite +84 kg	Kyo Hirata; Japan	Nurniyaz Yeldashov; Kazakhstan	Gofurjon Zokhidov; Uzbekistan
Kumite +84 kg	Kyo Hirata; Japan	Nurniyaz Yeldashov; Kazakhstan	Saleh Abazari; Iran
Team kumite	Iran; Saleh Abazari; Bahman Asgari; Ali Asghar Asiabari; Sajjad Ganjzadeh; Mehdi Khodabakhshi; Zabihollah Pourshab; Mehdi Shahgol	Kazakhstan; Nurkanat Azhikanov; Igor Chikhmarev; Nikita Tarnakin; Dias Ulbek; Nurniyaz Yeldashov; Daniyar Yuldashev; Marat Zhanbyr	Jordan; Mohammad Al-Jafari; Abdelrahman Al-Masatfa; Afeef Ghaith; Abdallah Hammad; Hasan Masarweh; Ahmad Shadid; Omar Shaqrah
Team kumite	Iran; Saleh Abazari; Bahman Asgari; Ali Asghar Asiabari; Sajjad Ganjzadeh; Mehdi Khodabakhshi; Zabihollah Pourshab; Mehdi Shahgol	Kazakhstan; Nurkanat Azhikanov; Igor Chikhmarev; Nikita Tarnakin; Dias Ulbek; Nurniyaz Yeldashov; Daniyar Yuldashev; Marat Zhanbyr	Uzbekistan; Adkham Ibragimov; Ruslan Kaljanov; Alisultan Khojiev; Kuvonchbek Mukhammadiev; Dastonbek Otabolaev; Sadriddin Saymatov; Gofurjon Zokhidov

=== Women ===
Event	Gold	Silver	Bronze
Individual kata	Hikaru Ono; Japan	Grace Lau; Hong Kong	Fatemeh Sadeghi; Iran
Individual kata	Hikaru Ono; Japan	Grace Lau; Hong Kong	Chien Hui-hsuan; Chinese Taipei
Team kata	Japan; Saori Ishibashi; Chiho Mizukami; Sae Taira	Iran; Najmeh Ghazizadeh; Shadi Jafarizadeh; Elnaz Taghipour	Indonesia; Emilia Sri Hanandyta; Anugerah Nurul Lucky; Dian Monika Nababan
Team kata	Japan; Saori Ishibashi; Chiho Mizukami; Sae Taira	Iran; Najmeh Ghazizadeh; Shadi Jafarizadeh; Elnaz Taghipour	Vietnam; Lưu Thị Thu Uyên; Nguyễn Ngọc Trâm; Nguyễn Thị Phương
Kumite −50 kg	Gu Shiau-shuang; Chinese Taipei	Miho Miyahara; Japan	Hawraa Al-Ajmi; United Arab Emirates
Kumite −50 kg	Gu Shiau-shuang; Chinese Taipei	Miho Miyahara; Japan	Sara Bahmanyar; Iran
Kumite −55 kg	Shiori Nakamura; Japan	Hoàng Thị Mỹ Tâm; Vietnam	Leen Mansour; Jordan
Kumite −55 kg	Shiori Nakamura; Japan	Hoàng Thị Mỹ Tâm; Vietnam	Fatemeh Saadati; Iran
Kumite −61 kg	Assel Kanay; Kazakhstan	Kymbat Toitonova; Kyrgyzstan	Nguyễn Thị Ngoan; Vietnam
Kumite −61 kg	Assel Kanay; Kazakhstan	Kymbat Toitonova; Kyrgyzstan	Sarara Shimada; Japan
Kumite −68 kg	Kayo Someya; Japan	Đinh Thị Hương; Vietnam	Mobina Heidari; Iran
Kumite −68 kg	Kayo Someya; Japan	Đinh Thị Hương; Vietnam	Ceyco Georgia Zefanya; Indonesia
Kumite +68 kg	Ayumi Uekusa; Japan	Sofya Berultseva; Kazakhstan	Leila Borjali; Iran
Kumite +68 kg	Ayumi Uekusa; Japan	Sofya Berultseva; Kazakhstan	Ho Kai Yan; Hong Kong
Team kumite	Kazakhstan; Laura Alikul; Sofya Berultseva; Assel Kanay; Bella Samasheva	Vietnam; Đinh Thị Hương; Hoàng Thị Mỹ Tâm; Nguyễn Thị Ngoan; Trương Thị Thương	Hong Kong; Choi Wan Yu; Chow Hei Wood; Ho Kai Yan; Tsang Yee Ting
Team kumite	Kazakhstan; Laura Alikul; Sofya Berultseva; Assel Kanay; Bella Samasheva	Vietnam; Đinh Thị Hương; Hoàng Thị Mỹ Tâm; Nguyễn Thị Ngoan; Trương Thị Thương	Japan; Tsubasa Kama; Ayaka Saito; Yuzuki Sawae; Sarara Shimada

== Medal table ==
Rank	Nation	Gold	Silver	Bronze	Total
1	Japan	8	2	3	13
2	Jordan	4	1	2	7
3	Kazakhstan	2	4	2	8
4	Iran	1	1	9	11
5	Kuwait	1	1	3	5
6	Chinese Taipei	1	0	1	2
7	Vietnam	0	3	2	5
8	Saudi Arabia	0	2	0	2
9	Indonesia	0	1	3	4
10	Hong Kong	0	1	2	3
11	Kyrgyzstan	0	1	0	1
12	Uzbekistan	0	0	3	3
13	Malaysia	0	0	2	2
14	South Korea	0	0	1	1
14	United Arab Emirates	0	0	1	1
Totals (15 entries)		17	17	34	68
