= 2017 Asian Karate Championships =

Karate competition

- Host city: Astana, Kazakhstan
- Dates: 15–17 July 2017
- Main venue: Astana Sports Complex

The 2017 Asian Karate Championships were the 14th edition of the Asian Karate Championships, and were held in Astana, Kazakhstan from July 15 to July 16, 2017.

== Medalists ==
=== Men ===
Event	Gold	Silver	Bronze
Individual kata	Ryo Kiyuna; Japan	Ahmad Zigi Zaresta Yuda; Indonesia	Lim Chee Wei; Malaysia
Individual kata	Ryo Kiyuna; Japan	Ahmad Zigi Zaresta Yuda; Indonesia	Wang Yi-ta; Chinese Taipei
Team kata	Japan; Arata Kinjo; Ryo Kiyuna; Takuya Uemura	Iran; Milad Delikhoun; Abolfazl Shahrjerdi; Ali Zand	Malaysia; Thomson Hoe; Emmanuel Leong; Lim Chee Wei
Team kata	Japan; Arata Kinjo; Ryo Kiyuna; Takuya Uemura	Iran; Milad Delikhoun; Abolfazl Shahrjerdi; Ali Zand	Indonesia; Andi Dasril Dwi Dharmawan; Andi Tomy Aditya Mardhana; Aspar Sesasria
Kumite −55 kg	Andrey Aktauov; Kazakhstan	Majid Hassannia; Iran	Abdullah Al-Harbi; Saudi Arabia
Kumite −55 kg	Andrey Aktauov; Kazakhstan	Majid Hassannia; Iran	Iwan Sirait; Indonesia
Kumite −60 kg	Amir Mehdizadeh; Iran	Sadriddin Saymatov; Uzbekistan	Saud Al-Basher; Saudi Arabia
Kumite −60 kg	Amir Mehdizadeh; Iran	Sadriddin Saymatov; Uzbekistan	Darkhan Assadilov; Kazakhstan
Kumite −67 kg	Fahad Al-Khathami; Saudi Arabia	Rinat Sagandykov; Kazakhstan	Sanjar Abdukarimov; Uzbekistan
Kumite −67 kg	Fahad Al-Khathami; Saudi Arabia	Rinat Sagandykov; Kazakhstan	Pan Po-shen; Chinese Taipei
Kumite −75 kg	Bahman Asgari; Iran	Hsu Wei-chun; Chinese Taipei	Sharmendran Raghonathan; Malaysia
Kumite −75 kg	Bahman Asgari; Iran	Hsu Wei-chun; Chinese Taipei	Ruslan Yesmakhanbet; Kazakhstan
Kumite −84 kg	Masaya Ishizuka; Japan	Daniyar Yuldashev; Kazakhstan	Mehdi Khodabakhshi; Iran
Kumite −84 kg	Masaya Ishizuka; Japan	Daniyar Yuldashev; Kazakhstan	Gianzhali Abasov; Kyrgyzstan
Kumite +84 kg	Tareg Hamedi; Saudi Arabia	Sajjad Ganjzadeh; Iran	Lou Wai Kit; Macau
Kumite +84 kg	Tareg Hamedi; Saudi Arabia	Sajjad Ganjzadeh; Iran	Gong Xuanwei; China
Team kumite	Iran; Bahman Asgari; Ali Asghar Asiabari; Sajjad Ganjzadeh; Ebrahim Hassanbeigi; Saman Heidari; Mehdi Khodabakhshi; Zabihollah Pourshab	Saudi Arabia; Saud Al-Basher; Abdullah Al-Harbi; Majed Al-Khalifah; Fahad Al-Khathami; Mohammed Al-Malki; Raef Al-Turkistani; Sultan Al-Zahrani	Japan; Masamichi Funahashi; Tetsuya Honda; Masaya Ishizuka; Makoto Koike; Yuta Mori; Ken Nishimura; Daisuke Watanabe
Team kumite	Iran; Bahman Asgari; Ali Asghar Asiabari; Sajjad Ganjzadeh; Ebrahim Hassanbeigi; Saman Heidari; Mehdi Khodabakhshi; Zabihollah Pourshab	Saudi Arabia; Saud Al-Basher; Abdullah Al-Harbi; Majed Al-Khalifah; Fahad Al-Khathami; Mohammed Al-Malki; Raef Al-Turkistani; Sultan Al-Zahrani	Kazakhstan; Yermek Ainazarov; Didar Amirali; Igor Chikhmarev; Assylbek Muratov; Nikolay Repin; Rinat Sagandykov; Daniyar Yuldashev

=== Women ===
Event	Gold	Silver	Bronze
Individual kata	Emiri Iwamoto; Japan	Sisilia Agustiani Ora; Indonesia	Celine Lee; Malaysia
Individual kata	Emiri Iwamoto; Japan	Sisilia Agustiani Ora; Indonesia	Monsicha Tararattanakul; Thailand
Team kata	Japan; Mai Mugiyama; Saori Okamoto; Sae Taira	Iran; Maedeh Nassiri; Parisa Rahmani; Mehri Yazdani	Malaysia; Ariana Lim; Cherlene Chung; Celine Lee
Team kata	Japan; Mai Mugiyama; Saori Okamoto; Sae Taira	Iran; Maedeh Nassiri; Parisa Rahmani; Mehri Yazdani	Indonesia; Ayu Rahmawati; Eva Fitriani Setiawati; Siti Maryam
Kumite −50 kg	Ayaka Tadano; Japan	Srunita Sari Sukatendel; Indonesia	Yekaterina Khupovets; Kazakhstan
Kumite −50 kg	Ayaka Tadano; Japan	Srunita Sari Sukatendel; Indonesia	Bakhriniso Babaeva; Uzbekistan
Kumite −55 kg	Wen Tzu-yun; Chinese Taipei	Fumika Ishiai; Japan	Syakilla Salni; Malaysia
Kumite −55 kg	Wen Tzu-yun; Chinese Taipei	Fumika Ishiai; Japan	Cok Istri Agung Sanistyarani; Indonesia
Kumite −61 kg	Yin Xiaoyan; China	Choi Wan Yu; Hong Kong	Madina Utelbayeva; Kazakhstan
Kumite −61 kg	Yin Xiaoyan; China	Choi Wan Yu; Hong Kong	Ayami Moriguchi; Japan
Kumite −68 kg	Kayo Someya; Japan	Tang Lingling; China	Hồ Thị Thu Hiền; Vietnam
Kumite −68 kg	Kayo Someya; Japan	Tang Lingling; China	Mobina Kaviani; Iran
Kumite +68 kg	Ayumi Uekusa; Japan	Nguyễn Thị Hồng Anh; Vietnam	Gao Mengmeng; China
Kumite +68 kg	Ayumi Uekusa; Japan	Nguyễn Thị Hồng Anh; Vietnam	Dessyinta Rakawuni Banurea; Indonesia
Team kumite	Iran; Hamideh Abbasali; Rozita Alipour; Fatemeh Chalaki; Delaram Dousti	Chinese Taipei; Chao Jou; Gu Shiau-shuang; Ku Tsui-ping; Wen Tzu-yun	Kazakhstan; Yekaterina Khupovets; Assel Serikova; Madina Utelbayeva; Sabina Zakharova
Team kumite	Iran; Hamideh Abbasali; Rozita Alipour; Fatemeh Chalaki; Delaram Dousti	Chinese Taipei; Chao Jou; Gu Shiau-shuang; Ku Tsui-ping; Wen Tzu-yun	Japan; Natsumi Kawamura; Ayaka Saito; Kayo Someya; Ayumi Uekusa

== Medal table ==
Rank	Nation	Gold	Silver	Bronze	Total
1	Japan	8	1	3	12
2	Iran	4	4	2	10
3	Saudi Arabia	2	1	2	5
4	Kazakhstan	1	2	6	9
5	Chinese Taipei	1	2	2	5
6	China	1	1	2	4
7	Indonesia	0	3	5	8
8	Uzbekistan	0	1	2	3
9	Vietnam	0	1	1	2
10	Hong Kong	0	1	0	1
11	Malaysia	0	0	6	6
12	Kyrgyzstan	0	0	1	1
12	Macau	0	0	1	1
12	Thailand	0	0	1	1
Totals (14 entries)		17	17	34	68
