= 2019 Asian Karate Championships =

Karate competition

- Host city: Tashkent, Uzbekistan
- Dates: 19–21 July 2019
- Main venue: Sport Complex Uzbekistan

The 2019 Asian Karate Championships were the 16th edition of the Asian Karate Championships, and were held in Tashkent, Uzbekistan from July 19 to July 21, 2019.

In the women's 68 kg event, the gold medalist Nodira Djumaniyazova of Uzbekistan has violated WKF Anti-doping Rules, Art Rules. As a result, Ceyco Georgia Zefanya received the gold medal and Chao Jou received the silver medal.

== Medalists ==
=== Men ===
Event	Gold	Silver	Bronze
Individual kata	Ryo Kiyuna; Japan	Ahmad Zigi Zaresta Yuda; Indonesia	Mohammad Al-Mosawi; Kuwait
Individual kata	Ryo Kiyuna; Japan	Ahmad Zigi Zaresta Yuda; Indonesia	Park Hee-jun; South Korea
Team kata	Japan; Arata Kinjo; Ryo Kiyuna; Takuya Uemura	Malaysia; Thomson Hoe; Emmanuel Leong; Ivan Oh	Kuwait; Mohammad Al-Mosawi; Salman Al-Mosawi; Mohammad Bader
Team kata	Japan; Arata Kinjo; Ryo Kiyuna; Takuya Uemura	Malaysia; Thomson Hoe; Emmanuel Leong; Ivan Oh	Iran; Milad Farazmehr; Abolfazl Shahrjerdi; Ali Zand
Kumite −55 kg	Andrey Aktauov; Kazakhstan	Abdullah Al-Harbi; Saudi Arabia	Prem Kumar Selvam; Malaysia
Kumite −55 kg	Andrey Aktauov; Kazakhstan	Abdullah Al-Harbi; Saudi Arabia	Javokhirbek Abdusattorov; Uzbekistan
Kumite −60 kg	Sadriddin Saymatov; Uzbekistan	Rafael Akbarov; Kyrgyzstan	Mohammad Fahed; Jordan
Kumite −60 kg	Sadriddin Saymatov; Uzbekistan	Rafael Akbarov; Kyrgyzstan	Abdullah Shaaban; Kuwait
Kumite −67 kg	Hiroto Shinohara; Japan	Didar Amirali; Kazakhstan	Ahmed Al-Hadharim; United Arab Emirates
Kumite −67 kg	Hiroto Shinohara; Japan	Didar Amirali; Kazakhstan	Abdelrahman Al-Masatfa; Jordan
Kumite −75 kg	Ken Nishimura; Japan	Abdulaziz Al-Hakami; Saudi Arabia	Omar Al-Jenaei; Kuwait
Kumite −75 kg	Ken Nishimura; Japan	Abdulaziz Al-Hakami; Saudi Arabia	Bahman Asgari; Iran
Kumite −84 kg	Zabihollah Pourshab; Iran	Mahmoud Sajan; Jordan	Mohammad Al-Mejadi; Kuwait
Kumite −84 kg	Zabihollah Pourshab; Iran	Mahmoud Sajan; Jordan	Ryutaro Araga; Japan
Kumite +84 kg	Tareg Hamedi; Saudi Arabia	Hideyoshi Kagawa; Japan	Sajjad Ganjzadeh; Iran
Kumite +84 kg	Tareg Hamedi; Saudi Arabia	Hideyoshi Kagawa; Japan	Teerawat Kangtong; Thailand
Team kumite	Iran; Saleh Abazari; Ali Asghar Asiabari; Sajjad Ganjzadeh; Mehdi Ghararizadeh; Mehdi Khodabakhshi; Zabihollah Pourshab; Barbod Sedaghat	Saudi Arabia; Omar Al-Azmi; Abdulaziz Al-Hakami; Abdullah Al-Harbi; Fahad Al-Khathami; Sultan Al-Zahrani; Meshari Al-Zuabi; Tareg Hamedi	Japan; Daiki Ando; Makoto Koike; Ryota Nakamura; Yusei Sakiyama; Rikito Shimada; Daina Ueyama; Fumiya Yoshimura
Team kumite	Iran; Saleh Abazari; Ali Asghar Asiabari; Sajjad Ganjzadeh; Mehdi Ghararizadeh; Mehdi Khodabakhshi; Zabihollah Pourshab; Barbod Sedaghat	Saudi Arabia; Omar Al-Azmi; Abdulaziz Al-Hakami; Abdullah Al-Harbi; Fahad Al-Khathami; Sultan Al-Zahrani; Meshari Al-Zuabi; Tareg Hamedi	Uzbekistan; Abdulaziz Ataboev; Jakhonshokh Ibrokhimov; Ruslan Kaljanov; Khurshidbek Mamajonov; Jakhongir Omonov; Dastonbek Otabolaev; Ikboljon Uzakov

=== Women ===
Event	Gold	Silver	Bronze
Individual kata	Kiyou Shimizu; Japan	Grace Lau; Hong Kong	Fatemeh Sadeghi; Iran
Individual kata	Kiyou Shimizu; Japan	Grace Lau; Hong Kong	Nguyễn Thị Phương; Vietnam
Team kata	Japan; Saori Ishibashi; Sae Taira; Misaki Yabumoto	Iran; Najmeh Ghazizadeh; Shadi Jafarizadeh; Elnaz Taghipour	Vietnam; Lê Thị Khánh Ly; Lưu Thị Thu Uyên; Nguyễn Thị Phương
Team kata	Japan; Saori Ishibashi; Sae Taira; Misaki Yabumoto	Iran; Najmeh Ghazizadeh; Shadi Jafarizadeh; Elnaz Taghipour	Hong Kong; Ma Ka Man; Wu Lok Man; Jenny To
Kumite −50 kg	Bakhriniso Babaeva; Uzbekistan	Miho Miyahara; Japan	Li Ranran; China
Kumite −50 kg	Bakhriniso Babaeva; Uzbekistan	Miho Miyahara; Japan	Gu Shiau-shuang; Chinese Taipei
Kumite −55 kg	Taravat Khaksar; Iran	Sevinch Rakhimova; Uzbekistan	Cok Istri Agung Sanistyarani; Indonesia
Kumite −55 kg	Taravat Khaksar; Iran	Sevinch Rakhimova; Uzbekistan	Wong Sok I Macau
Kumite −61 kg	Yin Xiaoyan; China	Rozita Alipour; Iran	Kymbat Toitonova; Kyrgyzstan
Kumite −61 kg	Yin Xiaoyan; China	Rozita Alipour; Iran	Ayami Moriguchi; Japan
Kumite −68 kg	Ceyco Georgia Zefanya; Indonesia	Chao Jou; Chinese Taipei	Kayo Someya; Japan
Kumite −68 kg	Ceyco Georgia Zefanya; Indonesia	Chao Jou; Chinese Taipei	None awarded
Kumite +68 kg	Hamideh Abbasali; Iran	Sofya Berultseva; Kazakhstan	Gao Mengmeng; China
Kumite +68 kg	Hamideh Abbasali; Iran	Sofya Berultseva; Kazakhstan	Mokhlaroyim Khakimjonova; Uzbekistan
Team kumite	Iran; Hamideh Abbasali; Shima Alesaadi; Zohreh Barzegar; Taravat Khaksar	Japan; Natsumi Kawamura; Ayaka Saito; Yuzuki Sawae; Sara Yamada	Vietnam; Đinh Thị Hương; Hồ Thị Thu Hiền; Lê Thị Thu Thảo; Trang Cẩm Lành
Team kumite	Iran; Hamideh Abbasali; Shima Alesaadi; Zohreh Barzegar; Taravat Khaksar	Japan; Natsumi Kawamura; Ayaka Saito; Yuzuki Sawae; Sara Yamada	China; Gao Mengmeng; Gong Li; Tang Lingling; Zhang Xiaoling

== Medal table ==
Rank	Nation	Gold	Silver	Bronze	Total
1	Japan	6	3	4	13
2	Iran	5	2	4	11
3	Uzbekistan	2	1	3	6
4	Saudi Arabia	1	3	0	4
5	Kazakhstan	1	2	0	3
6	Indonesia	1	1	1	3
7	China	1	0	3	4
8	Jordan	0	1	2	3
9	Chinese Taipei	0	1	1	2
9	Hong Kong	0	1	1	2
9	Kyrgyzstan	0	1	1	2
9	Malaysia	0	1	1	2
13	Kuwait	0	0	5	5
14	Vietnam	0	0	3	3
15	Macau	0	0	1	1
15	South Korea	0	0	1	1
15	Thailand	0	0	1	1
15	United Arab Emirates	0	0	1	1
Totals (18 entries)		17	17	33	67
