= 2021 Asian Karate Championships =

Asian Karate competition

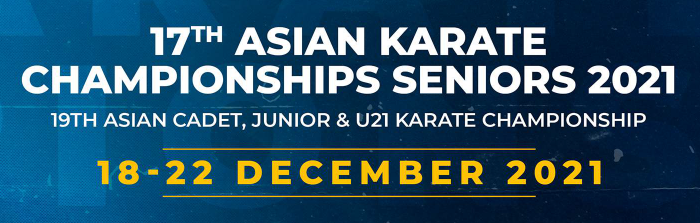
- Host city: Almaty, Kazakhstan
- Dates: 20–22 December 2021
- Main venue: Baluan Sholak Sports Palace

The 2021 Asian Karate Championships were the 17th edition of the Senior Asian Karate Championship and were held in Almaty, Kazakhstan from 20 to 22, December 2021. The event was held at the Baluan Sholak Sports Palace.

== Medalists ==
=== Men ===
Event	Gold	Silver	Bronze
Individual kata	Ryo Kiyuna; Japan	Ahmad Zigi Zaresta Yuda; Indonesia	Abolfazl Shahrjerdi; Iran
Individual kata	Ryo Kiyuna; Japan	Ahmad Zigi Zaresta Yuda; Indonesia	Mohammad Al-Mosawi; Kuwait
Team kata	Japan; Arata Kinjo; Ryo Kiyuna; Takuya Uemura	Iran; Milad Farazmehr; Abolfazl Shahrjerdi; Ali Zand	Indonesia; Albiadi; Andi Dharmawan; Andi Tomy Aditya Mardana
Team kata	Japan; Arata Kinjo; Ryo Kiyuna; Takuya Uemura	Iran; Milad Farazmehr; Abolfazl Shahrjerdi; Ali Zand	Kuwait; Mohammad Al-Mosawi; Salman Al-Mosawi; Mohammad Bader
Kumite −55 kg	Andrey Aktauov; Kazakhstan	Yasir Bargi; Saudi Arabia	Ari Saputra; Indonesia
Kumite −55 kg	Andrey Aktauov; Kazakhstan	Yasir Bargi; Saudi Arabia	Pouria Aghdasi; Iran
Kumite −60 kg	Abdallah Hammad; Jordan	Ali Meskini; Iran	Abdullah Shaaban; Kuwait
Kumite −60 kg	Abdallah Hammad; Jordan	Ali Meskini; Iran	Bader Al-Otaibi; Saudi Arabia
Kumite −67 kg	Soichiro Nakano; Japan	Fahad Al-Khathami; Saudi Arabia	Didar Amirali; Kazakhstan
Kumite −67 kg	Soichiro Nakano; Japan	Fahad Al-Khathami; Saudi Arabia	Abdelrahman Al-Masatfa; Jordan
Kumite −75 kg	Yusei Sakiyama; Japan	Sultan Al-Zahrani; Saudi Arabia	Nurkanat Azhikanov; Kazakhstan
Kumite −75 kg	Yusei Sakiyama; Japan	Sultan Al-Zahrani; Saudi Arabia	Ali Asghar Asiabari; Iran
Kumite −84 kg	Zabihollah Pourshab; Iran	Rikito Shimada; Japan	Wu Chun-wei; Chinese Taipei
Kumite −84 kg	Zabihollah Pourshab; Iran	Rikito Shimada; Japan	Baek Jun-hyeok; South Korea
Kumite +84 kg	Tareg Hamedi; Saudi Arabia	Saleh Abazari; Iran	Sulaiman Al-Mulla; United Arab Emirates
Kumite +84 kg	Tareg Hamedi; Saudi Arabia	Saleh Abazari; Iran	Adilet Shadykanov; Kyrgyzstan
Team kumite	Kazakhstan; Nurkanat Azhikanov; Igor Chikhmarev; Abylay Toltay; Nurniyaz Yeldashov; Spandiyar Yerkebek; Daniyar Yuldashev; Marat Zhanbyr	Iran; Saleh Abazari; Mehdi Ashouri; Keivan Baban; Sajjad Ganjzadeh; Saman Heidari; Mehdi Khodabakhshi; Zabihollah Pourshab	Saudi Arabia; Fahad Al-Khathami; Mohammed Al-Malki; Faraj Al-Nashri; Bader Al-Otaibi; Sultan Al-Zahrani; Tareg Hamedi; Sanad Sufyani
Team kumite	Kazakhstan; Nurkanat Azhikanov; Igor Chikhmarev; Abylay Toltay; Nurniyaz Yeldashov; Spandiyar Yerkebek; Daniyar Yuldashev; Marat Zhanbyr	Iran; Saleh Abazari; Mehdi Ashouri; Keivan Baban; Sajjad Ganjzadeh; Saman Heidari; Mehdi Khodabakhshi; Zabihollah Pourshab	Jordan; Zaki Abu Qaoud; Abdelrahman Al-Masatfa; Abdallah Hammad; Mahmoud Sajan; Omar Shaqrah

=== Women ===
Event	Gold	Silver	Bronze
Individual kata	Hikaru Ono; Japan	Krisda Putri Aprilia; Indonesia	Sakura Alforte; Philippines
Individual kata	Hikaru Ono; Japan	Krisda Putri Aprilia; Indonesia	Grace Lau; Hong Kong
Team kata	Japan; Saori Ishibashi; Sae Taira; Misaki Yabumoto	Indonesia; Emilia Sri Hanandyta; Anugerah Nurul Lucky; Dian Monika Nababan	Iran; Najmeh Ghazizadeh; Shadi Jafarizadeh; Elnaz Taghipour
Team kata	Japan; Saori Ishibashi; Sae Taira; Misaki Yabumoto	Indonesia; Emilia Sri Hanandyta; Anugerah Nurul Lucky; Dian Monika Nababan	Hong Kong; Ma Ka Man; Wong Sze Man; Wu Lok Man
Kumite −50 kg	Moldir Zhangbyrbay; Kazakhstan	Junna Tsukii; Philippines	Gu Shiau-shuang; Chinese Taipei
Kumite −50 kg	Moldir Zhangbyrbay; Kazakhstan	Junna Tsukii; Philippines	Tsang Yee Ting; Hong Kong
Kumite −55 kg	Hoàng Thị Mỹ Tâm; Vietnam	Ku Tsui-ping; Chinese Taipei	Cok Istri Agung Sanistyarani; Indonesia
Kumite −55 kg	Hoàng Thị Mỹ Tâm; Vietnam	Ku Tsui-ping; Chinese Taipei	Taravat Khaksar; Iran
Kumite −61 kg	Sarah Al-Ameri; United Arab Emirates	Jamie Lim; Philippines	Rozita Alipour; Iran
Kumite −61 kg	Sarah Al-Ameri; United Arab Emirates	Jamie Lim; Philippines	Kymbat Toitonova; Kyrgyzstan
Kumite −68 kg	Kayo Someya; Japan	Mobina Heidari; Iran	Hồ Thị Thu Hiền; Vietnam
Kumite −68 kg	Kayo Someya; Japan	Mobina Heidari; Iran	Assel Kanay; Kazakhstan
Kumite +68 kg	Yuzuki Sawae; Japan	Sofya Berultseva; Kazakhstan	Leila Borjali; Iran
Kumite +68 kg	Yuzuki Sawae; Japan	Sofya Berultseva; Kazakhstan	Kewalin Songklin; Thailand
Team kumite	Vietnam; Đinh Thị Hương; Hồ Thị Thu Hiền; Hoàng Thị Mỹ Tâm; Nguyễn Thị Ngoan	United Arab Emirates; Sarah Al-Ameri; Hawraa Al-Ajmi; Al-Yazia Ismail; Fatma Khasaif	Japan; Yuzuki Sawae; Kayo Someya; Maya Suzuki; Sumika Yazawa
Team kumite	Vietnam; Đinh Thị Hương; Hồ Thị Thu Hiền; Hoàng Thị Mỹ Tâm; Nguyễn Thị Ngoan	United Arab Emirates; Sarah Al-Ameri; Hawraa Al-Ajmi; Al-Yazia Ismail; Fatma Khasaif	Kazakhstan; Madina Alimanova; Sofya Berultseva; Sabina Zakharova; Moldir Zhangbyrbay

== Medal table ==
Rank	Nation	Gold	Silver	Bronze	Total
1	Japan	8	1	1	10
2	Kazakhstan	3	1	4	8
3	Vietnam	2	0	1	3
4	Iran	1	5	7	13
5	Saudi Arabia	1	3	2	6
6	United Arab Emirates	1	1	1	3
7	Jordan	1	0	2	3
8	Indonesia	0	3	3	6
9	Philippines	0	2	1	3
10	Chinese Taipei	0	1	2	3
11	Hong Kong	0	0	3	3
11	Kuwait	0	0	3	3
13	Kyrgyzstan	0	0	2	2
14	South Korea	0	0	1	1
14	Thailand	0	0	1	1
Totals (15 entries)		17	17	34	68
