= 2018 World Karate Championships – Men's team kata =

Karate competition

Men's team kata at the 2018 World Karate Championships
- Location: Madrid, Spain
- Dates: 8-11 November
- Competitors: 24 teams from 24 nations

Medalists
gold medal	Arata Kinjo; Ryo Kiyuna; Takuya Uemura	Japan
silver medal	José Carbonell; Sergio Galán; Francisco Salazar	Spain
bronze medal	Milad Delikhoun; Abolfazl Shahrjerdi; Ali Zand	Iran
bronze medal	Gianluca Gallo; Alessandro Iodice; Giuseppe Panagia	Italy

The preliminary rounds of the Men's team kata competition at the 2018 World Karate Championships were held on November 8, 2018, and the finals on November 11, 2018.

== Results ==
=== Finals ===
Semi-finals
Spain	3
Turkey	2
Italy	0
Japan	5

Final
Spain	0
Japan	5

=== Repechage ===
Repechage
Kuwait	2
Iran	3

Third place
Iran	3
Turkey	2

Repechage
Colombia	1
Malaysia	4

Third place
Malaysia	0
Italy	5

=== Top Draw ===
First round
Brazil	0
Russia	5
Serbia	1
Kuwait	4
Azerbaijan	5
Burkina Faso	0
Croatia	0
Morocco	5

Second round
Russia	1
Iran	4
Kuwait	0
Spain	5
Azerbaijan	0
Turkey	5
Morocco	2
France	3

Quarterfinals
Iran	0
Spain	5
Turkey	3
France	2

Semifinals
Spain	3
Turkey	2

=== Bottom Draw ===
First round
England	5
Costa Rica	0
Hong Kong	5
South Africa	0
India	0
Malaysia	5
Montenegro	2
Colombia	3

Second round
England	2
Algeria	3
Hong Kong	0
Italy	5
Malaysia	4
Peru	1
Colombia	0
Japan	5

Quarterfinals
Algeria	1
Italy	4
Malaysia	0
Japan	5

Semifinals
Italy	0
Japan	5
