= Masaya Ishizuka =

Japanese karateka

Sport
- Country: Japan
- Sport: Karate
- Weight class: 84 kg
Medal record
Men's karate
Representing Japan
World Championships
Silver medal – second place	2016 Linz	Team kumite
Bronze medal – third place	2014 Bremen	Team kumite
Asian Championships
Gold medal – first place	2017 Astana	Kumite 84 kg
Bronze medal – third place	2017 Astana	Team kumite
Bronze medal – third place	2018 Amman	Team kumite

Masaya Ishizuka is a Japanese karateka. He won the gold medal in the men's kumite 84 kg event at the 2017 Asian Karate Championships held in Astana, Kazakhstan.

At the 2016 World Karate Championships held in Linz, Austria, he won the silver medal in the men's team kumite event.
