= Mai Mugiyama =

Japanese karateka

Sport
- Country: Japan
- Sport: Karate
- Event: Team kata
Medal record
Women's karate
Representing Japan
World Championships
Gold medal – first place	2018 Madrid	Team kata
Asian Championships
Gold medal – first place	2017 Astana	Team kata
Gold medal – first place	2018 Amman	Team kata

Mai Mugiyama is a Japanese karateka. She won the gold medal in the women's team kata event at the 2018 World Karate Championships held in Madrid, Spain.

== Achievements ==
Year	Competition	Venue	Rank	Event
2017	Asian Championships	Astana, Kazakhstan	1st	Team kata
2018	Asian Championships	Amman, Jordan	1st	Team kata
2018	World Championships	Madrid, Spain	1st	Team kata
