= Sultan Al-Zahrani =

Saudi Arabian karateka (born 1998)

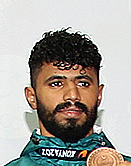

Personal information
- Born: 19 December 1998 (age 27)

Sport
- Country: Saudi Arabia
- Sport: Karate
- Weight class: 75 kg
- Events: Kumite; Team kumite
Medal record
Men's karate
Representing Saudi Arabia
Event	1st	2nd	3rd
Asian Karate Championships	0	5	2
Islamic Solidarity Games	0	0	2
Total	0	5	4
Asian Championships
Silver medal – second place	2017 Astana	Team kumite
Silver medal – second place	2018 Amman	Team kumite
Silver medal – second place	2019 Tashkent	Team kumite
Silver medal – second place	2021 Almaty	Kumite 75 kg
Silver medal – second place	2022 Tashkent	Kumite 75 kg
Bronze medal – third place	2021 Almaty	Team kumite
Bronze medal – third place	2023 Malacca	Kumite 75 kg
Islamic Solidarity Games
Bronze medal – third place	2021 Konya	Kumite 75 kg
Bronze medal – third place	2025 Riyadh	Kumite 75 kg

Sultan Al-Zahrani (Arabic: سلطان الزهراني; born 19 December 1998) is a Saudi Arabian karateka. He won the silver medal in the men's kumite 75 kg event at the 2021 Asian Karate Championships held in Almaty, Kazakhstan. He won one of the bronze medals in the men's 75 kg event at the 2021 Islamic Solidarity Games held in Konya, Turkey.

Al-Zahrani competed in the men's 60 kg event at the 2018 Asian Games held in Jakarta, Indonesia. In 2021, he competed at the World Olympic Qualification Tournament held in Paris, France hoping to qualify for the 2020 Summer Olympics in Tokyo, Japan.

He won one of the bronze medals in his event at the 2023 Asian Karate Championships held in Malacca, Malaysia.

== Achievements ==
Year	Competition	Venue	Rank	Event
2017	Asian Championships	Astana, Kazakhstan	2nd	Team kumite
2018	Asian Championships	Amman, Jordan	2nd	Team kumite
2019	Asian Championships	Tashkent, Uzbekistan	2nd	Team kumite
2021	Asian Championships	Almaty, Kazakhstan	2nd	Kumite 75 kg
2021	Asian Championships	Almaty, Kazakhstan	3rd	Team kumite
2022	Islamic Solidarity Games	Konya, Turkey	3rd	Kumite 75 kg
2022	Asian Championships	Tashkent, Uzbekistan	2nd	Kumite 75 kg
2023	Asian Championships	Malacca, Malaysia	3rd	Kumite 75 kg
