= 2016 World Karate Championships =

Karate competitions

- Host city: Linz, Austria
- Dates: 25–30 October
- Main venue: TipsArena Linz

The 2016 World Karate Championships were the 23rd edition of the World Karate Championships, and were held in Linz, Austria from October 25 to October 30, 2016.

== Medalists ==
=== Men ===
Event	Gold	Silver	Bronze
Individual kata	Ryo Kiyuna; Japan	Damián Quintero; Spain	Ilja Smorguner; Germany
Individual kata	Ryo Kiyuna; Japan	Damián Quintero; Spain	Antonio Díaz; Venezuela
Team kata	Japan; Arata Kinjo; Ryo Kiyuna; Takuya Uemura	France; Lucas Jeannot; Enzo Montarello; Ahmed Zemouri	Italy; Mattia Busato; Alessandro Iodice; Alfredo Tocco
Team kata	Japan; Arata Kinjo; Ryo Kiyuna; Takuya Uemura	France; Lucas Jeannot; Enzo Montarello; Ahmed Zemouri	Spain; José Carbonell; Damián Quintero; Francisco Salazar
Kumite −60 kg	Amir Mehdizadeh; Iran	Geoffrey Berens; Netherlands	Firdovsi Farzaliyev; Azerbaijan
Kumite −60 kg	Amir Mehdizadeh; Iran	Geoffrey Berens; Netherlands	Sofiane Agoudjil; France
Kumite −67 kg	Jordan Thomas; England	Yves Martial Tadissi; Hungary	Steven Da Costa; France
Kumite −67 kg	Jordan Thomas; England	Yves Martial Tadissi; Hungary	Andrés Madera; Venezuela
Kumite −75 kg	Rafael Aghayev; Azerbaijan	Omar Abdelrahman; Egypt	Ali Asghar Asiabari; Iran
Kumite −75 kg	Rafael Aghayev; Azerbaijan	Omar Abdelrahman; Egypt	Luigi Busà; Italy
Kumite −84 kg	Ryutaro Araga; Japan	Aykhan Mamayev; Azerbaijan	Zabihollah Pourshab; Iran
Kumite −84 kg	Ryutaro Araga; Japan	Aykhan Mamayev; Azerbaijan	Kenji Grillon; France
Kumite +84 kg	Sajjad Ganjzadeh; Iran	Achraf Ouchen; Morocco	Anđelo Kvesić; Croatia
Kumite +84 kg	Sajjad Ganjzadeh; Iran	Achraf Ouchen; Morocco	Herolind Nishevci; Kosovo
Team kumite	Iran; Saeid Ahmadi; Bahman Asgari; Ali Fadakar; Sajjad Ganjzadeh; Mehdi Khodabakhshi; Zabihollah Pourshab; Iman Sanchouli	Japan; Ryutaro Araga; Rikiya Iimura; Masaya Ishizuka; Hideyoshi Kagawa; Ken Nishimura; Hiroto Shinohara; Daisuke Watanabe	Germany; Noah Bitsch; Mehmet Bolat; Nico Drexel; Ricardo Giegler; Jonathan Horne; Heinrich Leistenschneider; Robin Winters
Team kumite	Iran; Saeid Ahmadi; Bahman Asgari; Ali Fadakar; Sajjad Ganjzadeh; Mehdi Khodabakhshi; Zabihollah Pourshab; Iman Sanchouli	Japan; Ryutaro Araga; Rikiya Iimura; Masaya Ishizuka; Hideyoshi Kagawa; Ken Nishimura; Hiroto Shinohara; Daisuke Watanabe	France; Amin Bouazza; Jessie Da Costa; Logan Da Costa; Steven Da Costa; Marvin Garin; Kenji Grillon; Corentin Seguy

=== Women ===
Event	Gold	Silver	Bronze
Individual kata	Kiyou Shimizu; Japan	Sarah Sayed; Egypt	Viviana Bottaro; Italy
Individual kata	Kiyou Shimizu; Japan	Sarah Sayed; Egypt	Sandra Sánchez; Spain
Team kata	Japan; Miku Morioka; Hikaru Ono; Kyosuke Yamashita	Spain; Gema Morales; Margarita Morata; Paula Rodríguez	Italy; Sara Battaglia; Viviana Bottaro; Michela Pezzetti
Team kata	Japan; Miku Morioka; Hikaru Ono; Kyosuke Yamashita	Spain; Gema Morales; Margarita Morata; Paula Rodríguez	Turkey; Dilara Bozan; Rabia Küsmüş; Gizem Şahin
Kumite −50 kg	Alexandra Recchia; France	Miho Miyahara; Japan	Radwa Sayed; Egypt
Kumite −50 kg	Alexandra Recchia; France	Miho Miyahara; Japan	Bettina Plank; Austria
Kumite −55 kg	Emily Thouy; France	Valéria Kumizaki; Brazil	Wen Tzu-yun; Chinese Taipei
Kumite −55 kg	Emily Thouy; France	Valéria Kumizaki; Brazil	Sara Yamada; Japan
Kumite −61 kg	Giana Farouk; Egypt	Lucie Ignace; France	Anita Serogina; Ukraine
Kumite −61 kg	Giana Farouk; Egypt	Lucie Ignace; France	Ingrida Suchánková; Slovakia
Kumite −68 kg	Alisa Buchinger; Austria	Katrine Pedersen; Denmark	Ivona Ćavar; Bosnia and Herzegovina
Kumite −68 kg	Alisa Buchinger; Austria	Katrine Pedersen; Denmark	Marina Raković; Montenegro
Kumite +68 kg	Ayumi Uekusa; Japan	Eleni Chatziliadou; Greece	Dominika Tatárová; Slovakia
Kumite +68 kg	Ayumi Uekusa; Japan	Eleni Chatziliadou; Greece	Hamideh Abbasali; Iran
Team kumite	France; Alizée Agier; Leïla Heurtault; Lucie Ignace; Alexandra Recchia	Spain; Cristina Ferrer; Laura Palacio; Rocío Sánchez; Cristina Vizcaíno	United States; Ashley Davis; Cheryl Murphy; Brandi Robinson; Maya Wasowicz
Team kumite	France; Alizée Agier; Leïla Heurtault; Lucie Ignace; Alexandra Recchia	Spain; Cristina Ferrer; Laura Palacio; Rocío Sánchez; Cristina Vizcaíno	Egypt; Giana Farouk; Yassmin Hamdy; Randa Rousfelt; Nada Sayed

== Medal table ==
Rank	Nation	Gold	Silver	Bronze	Total
1	Japan	6	2	1	9
2	France	3	2	4	9
3	Iran	3	0	3	6
4	Egypt	1	2	2	5
5	Azerbaijan	1	1	1	3
6	Austria	1	0	1	2
7	England	1	0	0	1
8	Spain	0	3	2	5
9	Brazil	0	1	0	1
9	Denmark	0	1	0	1
9	Greece	0	1	0	1
9	Hungary	0	1	0	1
9	Morocco	0	1	0	1
9	Netherlands	0	1	0	1
15	Italy	0	0	4	4
16	Germany	0	0	2	2
16	Slovakia	0	0	2	2
16	Venezuela	0	0	2	2
19	Bosnia and Herzegovina	0	0	1	1
19	Chinese Taipei	0	0	1	1
19	Croatia	0	0	1	1
19	Kosovo	0	0	1	1
19	Montenegro	0	0	1	1
19	Turkey	0	0	1	1
19	Ukraine	0	0	1	1
19	United States	0	0	1	1
Totals (26 entries)		16	16	32	64

== Participating nations ==
1024 athletes from 118 nations competed.

- Afghanistan (2)
- Albania (3)
- Algeria (14)
- Andorra (1)
- Argentina (5)
- Armenia (6)
- Australia (11)
- Austria (15)
- Azerbaijan (14)
- Bangladesh (7)
- Belarus (7)
- Belgium (9)
- Bosnia and Herzegovina (14)
- Botswana (4)
- Brazil (16)
- Bulgaria (8)
- Cameroon (10)
- Canada (15)
- Chad (12)
- Chile (13)
- China (13)
- Chinese Taipei (11)
- Colombia (6)
- Congo (6)
- Costa Rica (3)
- Croatia (16)
- Curaçao (2)
- Cyprus (3)
- Czech Republic (7)
- Denmark (14)
- Dominican Republic (14)
- Ecuador (10)
- Egypt (16)
- England (13)
- Estonia (4)
- Fiji (2)
- Finland (8)
- France (16)
- Georgia (7)
- Germany (14)
- Ghana (11)
- Greece (11)
- Guatemala (7)
- Hong Kong (14)
- Hungary (12)
- Iceland (5)
- India (16)
- Indonesia (13)
- Iran (16)
- Iraq (8)
- Ireland (12)
- Israel (9)
- Italy (16)
- Ivory Coast (1)
- Japan (16)
- Jordan (4)
- Kazakhstan (13)
- Kenya (15)
- Kosovo (8)
- Kyrgyzstan (7)
- Latvia (3)
- Lebanon (2)
- Libya (4)
- Luxembourg (2)
- Macau (9)
- Macedonia (12)
- Madagascar (2)
- Malaysia (7)
- Mali (3)
- Malta (1)
- Mexico (14)
- Moldova (2)
- Montenegro (12)
- Morocco (10)
- Mozambique (8)
- Nepal (1)
- Netherlands (10)
- New Zealand (9)
- Nicaragua (4)
- Norway (4)
- Oman (2)
- Pakistan (1)
- Palestine (2)
- Papua New Guinea (4)
- Paraguay (3)
- Peru (13)
- Poland (15)
- Portugal (15)
- Puerto Rico (1)
- Qatar (4)
- Romania (15)
- Russia (16)
- Rwanda (2)
- San Marino (1)
- Saudi Arabia (8)
- Scotland (1)
- Senegal (9)
- Serbia (16)
- Slovakia (15)
- Slovenia (13)
- South Africa (13)
- South Korea (10)
- Spain (16)
- Sri Lanka (5)
- Sweden (2)
- Switzerland (11)
- Thailand (3)
- Tunisia (13)
- Turkey (16)
- Ukraine (15)
- United Arab Emirates (6)
- United States (16)
- Uruguay (2)
- Uzbekistan (10)
- Venezuela (12)
- Vietnam (7)
- Wales (6)
- Yemen (1)
