= Zohreh Barzegar =

Iranian karateka (born 1996)

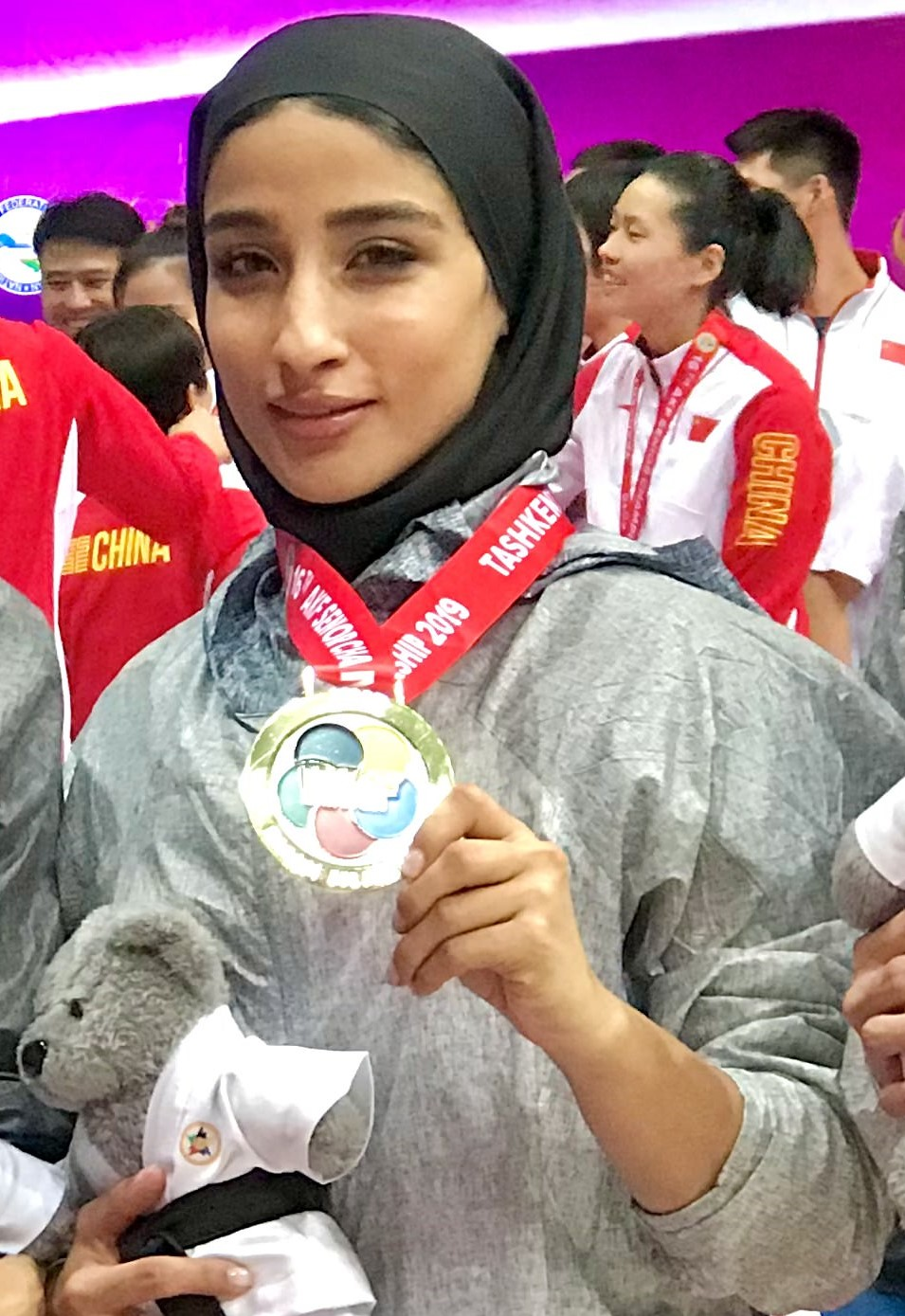
- Barzegar at Asian Karate Championships 2019

Personal information
- Born: 21 August 1996 (age 29) Qaem Shahr, Mazandaran province, Iran
- Education: Physical education
- Height: 1.76 m (5 ft 9 in)
- Weight: 61 kg (134 lb)

Sport
- Event: Kumite
- College team: Islamic Azad University
- Coached by: zahra samadi
Medal record
Women's karate
Representing Iran
Asian Championships
Gold medal – first place	2019 Tashkent	Team

Zohreh Barzegar (Persian: زهره برزگر, born 21 August 1996 in Qaem Shahr) is an Iranian karateka. She achieved gold medal in final game of Asian karate championships 2019 held in Tashkent, Uzbekistan in kumite +61 category.

In 15th Asian Karate Federation (AKF) Cadet, Junior & U21 Championships barzegar, who was competing at the –55 kg weight category in Under-21 age group, managed to thrash rivals from Jordan, Japan, Thailand and China Taipei before standing on top of the podium.
