= Misaki Yabumoto =

Japanese karateka

Sport
- Country: Japan
- Sport: Karate
- Event: Team kata
Medal record
Women's karate
Representing Japan
World Championships
Gold medal – first place	2021 Dubai	Team kata
Asian Championships
Gold medal – first place	2019 Tashkent	Team kata
Gold medal – first place	2021 Almaty	Team kata

Misaki Yabumoto is a Japanese karateka. She won the gold medal in the women's team kata event at the 2021 World Karate Championships held in Dubai, United Arab Emirates. A month later, she won the gold medal in this event at the 2021 Asian Karate Championships held in Almaty, Kazakhstan.

== Achievements ==
Year	Competition	Venue	Rank	Event
2019	Asian Championships	Tashkent, Uzbekistan	1st	Team kata
2021	World Championships	Dubai, United Arab Emirates	1st	Team kata
2021	Asian Championships	Almaty, Kazakhstan	1st	Team kata
