= Leila Borjali =

Iranian karateka

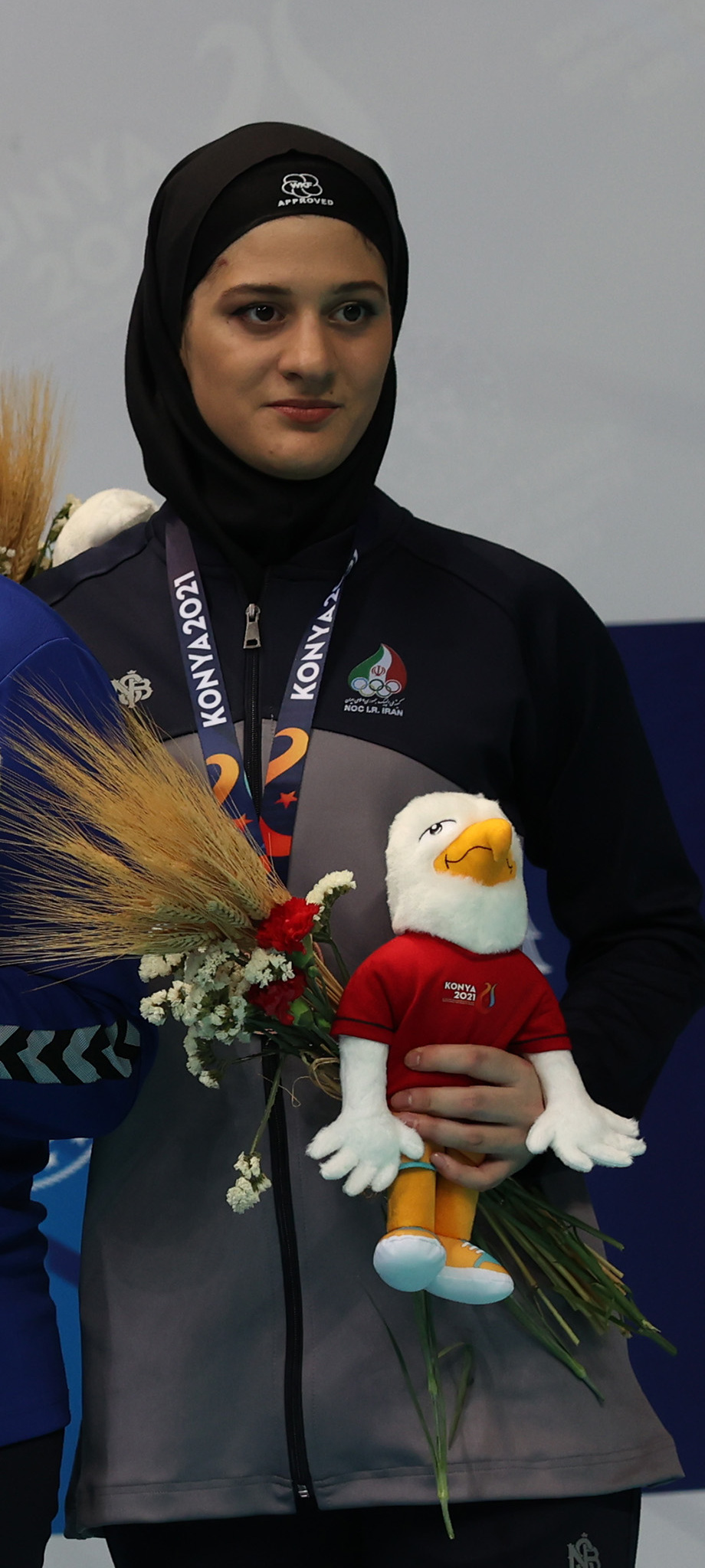
- Borjali at the 2021 Islamic Solidarity Games

Sport
- Country: Iran
- Sport: Karate
- Weight class: +68 kg
- Events: Kumite; Team kumite
Medal record
Women's karate
Representing Iran
Asian Championships
Silver medal – second place	2023 Malacca	Team kumite
Bronze medal – third place	2021 Almaty	Kumite +68 kg
Bronze medal – third place	2022 Tashkent	Kumite +68 kg
Islamic Solidarity Games
Bronze medal – third place	2021 Konya	Kumite +68 kg

Leila Borjali is an Iranian karateka. She won one of the bronze medals in the women's +68 kg event at the 2021 Islamic Solidarity Games held in Konya, Turkey. She is also a two-time bronze medalist in this event at the Asian Karate Championships.

== Career ==
She won one of the bronze medals in her event at the 2021 Asian Karate Championships held in Almaty, Kazakhstan. She also won one of the bronze medals in her event at the 2022 Asian Karate Championships held in Tashkent, Uzbekistan.

In 2023, she competed in the women's +68 kg event at the 2023 World Karate Championships held in Budapest, Hungary. She was eliminated in the repechage by Johanna Kneer of Germany.

== Achievements ==
Year	Competition	Venue	Rank	Event
2021	Asian Championships	Almaty, Kazakhstan	3rd	Kumite +68 kg
2022	Islamic Solidarity Games	Konya, Turkey	3rd	Kumite +68 kg
2022	Asian Championships	Tashkent, Uzbekistan	3rd	Kumite +68 kg
2023	Asian Championships	Malacca, Malaysia	2nd	Team kumite
