= Karate at the 2018 Asian Games – Men's kumite 84 kg =

Karate competition

Men's kumite 84 kg at the 2018 Asian Games
- Venue: Jakarta Convention Center
- Date: 27 August 2018
- Competitors: 13 from 13 nations

Medalists
gold medal	Ryutaro Araga	Japan
silver medal	Ahmad Al-Mesfer	Kuwait
bronze medal	Zabihollah Pourshab	Iran
bronze medal	Wu Chun-wei	Chinese Taipei

The men's kumite 84 kilograms competition at the 2018 Asian Games took place on 27 August, 2018, at the Jakarta Convention Center Plenary Hall Jakarta, Indonesia.

== Schedule ==
All times are Western Indonesia Time (UTC+07:00)

Date	Time	Event
Monday, 27 August 2018	14:00	1/8 finals
Monday, 27 August 2018	14:00	Quarterfinals
Monday, 27 August 2018	14:00	Semifinals
Monday, 27 August 2018	14:00	Final of repechage
Monday, 27 August 2018	14:00	Finals

== Results ==
Legend

- H — Won by hansoku (8–0)

=== Main bracket ===
1/8 finals
Ahmad Al-Mesfer (KUW)	6
Mahmoud Sajan (JOR)	3
Kavindu Lakshitha (SRI)	0
Ma Zeyun (CHN)	2
Zabihollah Pourshab (IRI)	8
Javohir Haidarov (TJK)	0
Ryutaro Araga (JPN)	8
Sharief Afif (PHI)	0
Gianzhali Abasov (KGZ)	1
Shakhboz Akhatov (UZB)	8

Quarterfinals
Ahmad Al-Mesfer (KUW)	4
Ma Zeyun (CHN)	1
Zabihollah Pourshab (IRI)	0^{H}
Diwas Shrestha (NEP)	0
Ryutaro Araga (JPN)	2^{H}
Wu Chun-wei (TPE)	1
Shakhboz Akhatov (UZB)	3^{H}
Vishal (IND)	0

Semifinals
Ahmad Al-Mesfer (KUW)	5
Zabihollah Pourshab (IRI)	5
Ryutaro Araga (JPN)	3
Shakhboz Akhatov (UZB)	2

Final
Ahmad Al-Mesfer (KUW)	1
Ryutaro Araga (JPN)	1

=== Repechage ===
Final of repechage
Mahmoud Sajan (JOR)	6
Ma Zeyun (CHN)	0
Sharief Afif (PHI)	0
Wu Chun-wei (TPE)	6

Bronze medals
Mahmoud Sajan (JOR)	2
Zabihollah Pourshab (IRI)	3
Wu Chun-wei (TPE)	5
Shakhboz Akhatov (UZB)	5
