= Ali Zand =

Iranian karateka (born 1999)

Personal information
- Born: 25 May 1999 (age 27) Arak, Iran
- Height: 170
- Weight: 70

Sport
- Country: Iran
- Sport: Karate
- Event: Kata
- Coached by: Ghasem Shahrjerdi
Medal record
Representing Iran
Men's karate
World Championships
Bronze medal – third place	2018 Madrid	Team kata
Asian Championships
Silver medal – second place	2017 Astana	Team kata
Silver medal – second place	2021 Almaty	Team kata
Bronze medal – third place	2019 Tashkent	Team kata
Bronze medal – third place	2013 Dubai	Individual kata
Bronze medal – third place	2022 Tashkent	Individual kata
Bronze medal – third place	2022 Tashkent	Team kata
Bronze medal – third place	2025 Tashkent	Team kata
Bronze medal – third place	2026 Bali	Individual kata
Islamic Solidarity Games
Bronze medal – third place	2021 Konya	Team kata
Karate1 Premier League
Gold medal – first place	Turkey 2013	Individual kata
Bronze medal – third place	Paris 2018	Team kata
Bronze medal – third place	Dubai 2019	Team kata

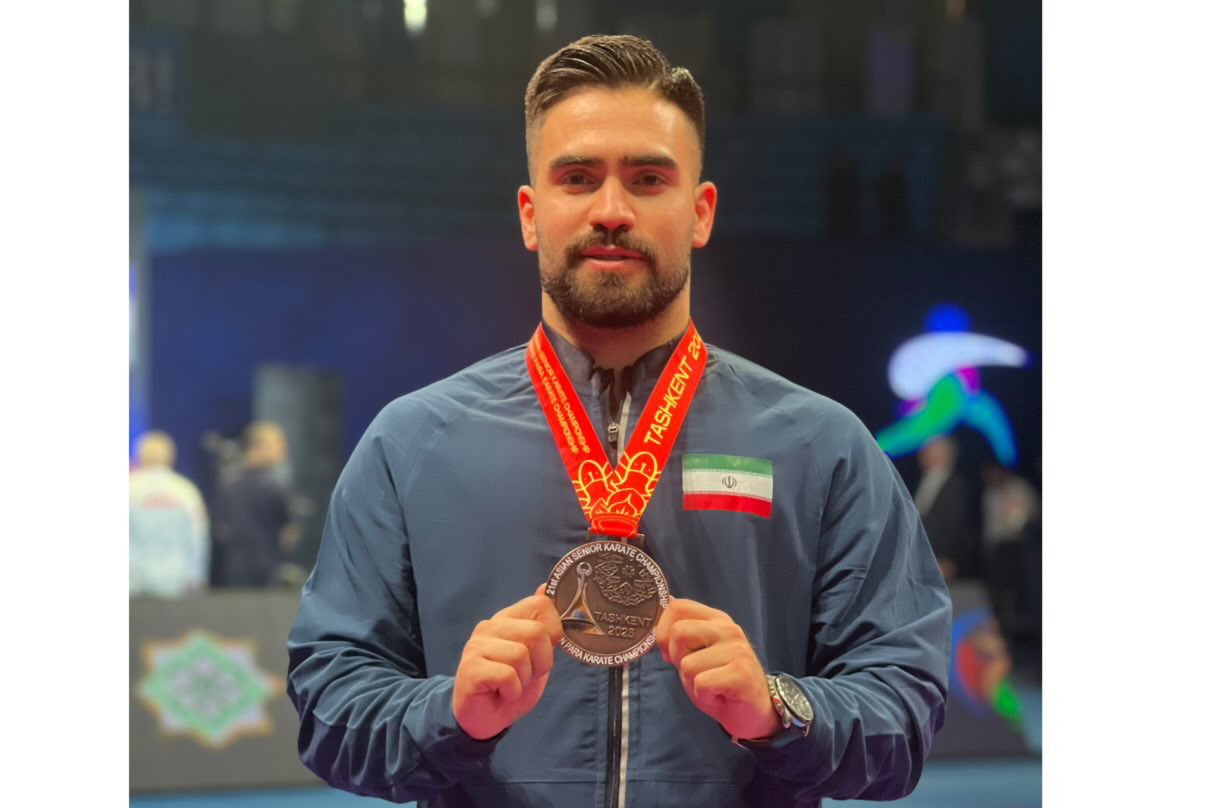
A photograph of Ali Zand

Ali Zand (Persian: علی زند born May 25, 1999, June) is an Iranian karateka. Zand was born in Arak. He practiced karate from the age of four, under the supervision of his coach (Ghasem Shahrjerdi) and he is active in the Shitorio style. He has been in the national team camps since 2008, and together with his teammates, won the first Iranian Men's Kata Team Adult Medal in the 2018 Karate World Championships in Madrid.

== Achievements ==
Year	Competition	Venue	Rank	Event
2013	Asian Championships	Dubai, Emirates	3rd	Individual kata
2017	Asian Championships	Astana, Kazakhstan	2nd	Team kata
2018	World Championships	Madrid, Spain	3rd	Team kata
2019	Asian Championships	Tashkent, Uzbekistan	3rd	Team kata
2021	Asian Championships	Almaty, Kazakhstan		
2021	Asian Championships	Almaty, Kazakhstan	2nd	Team kata
2022	Islamic Solidarity Games	Konya, Turkey		
2022	Islamic Solidarity Games	Konya, Turkey	3rd	Team kata
2022	Asian Championships	Tashkent, Kazakhstan	3rd	Individual kata
2022	Asian Championships	Tashkent, Kazakhstan	3rd	Team kata

== Early life ==
Zand began karate at the age of four with Nosrat Karimi and continued the sport under Qasim Shahrjerdi. He is currently an undergraduate biology student at Shahid Bahonar Cultural University of Isfahan and has obtained his diploma in experimental science.

== Sports career ==
He has been in the national team camps since 2008, and together with his teammates won the first Iranian Men's Kata Team Adult Medal in the Karate World Championships in Madrid in 2018.

== Honors ==
=== World Championship ===
- 2018 Bronze Kata Team Medal of the World Championships in Spain

=== Students of the world ===
- 2018 Japan Kata Team Bronze Medal Team of the Year 6 Japan

=== Asian ===
- 2017 Silver Team Kata Silver Team of the Year Kazakhstan 5
- 2013 UAE Solo Kata Bronze Medal of the Year, UAE
- 2019 Uzbekistan Team Kata Bronze Medal of the Year 6 Uzbekistan
- 2021 Silver Team Kata, Almaty

=== World League ===
- 2013 Gold Kata Solo Gold medal in the World Championships in Turkey
- 2018 Bronze Kate Medal of the French World League Team Championship of the Year
- 2019 Bronze Kata Team of the Emirates World League Team Championship of the Year
- 2019 Team Kata Bronze Medal of the World Championship Tournament of the Year 6 Turkey

=== World Cup ===
- 2016 Gold medal in the Kata Individual World Cup in Urmia
- 2019 Gold Medal Kata Individual World Cup Tournament Urmia
- 2016 Gold medal for Team Kata in Urmia World Cup
- 2017 Gold medal for Team Kata in Urmia World Cup
- 2018 Urmia World Cup Solo Kata Bronze Medal
