= 2018 World Karate Championships =

Karate competition

- Host city: Madrid, Spain
- Dates: 6–11 November
- Main venue: WiZink Center

The 2018 World Karate Championships were the 24th edition of the World Karate Championships, and were held in Madrid, Spain from November 6 to November 11, 2018.

== Medalists ==
=== Men ===
Event	Gold	Silver	Bronze
Individual kata	Ryo Kiyuna; Japan	Damián Quintero; Spain	Ali Sofuoğlu; Turkey
Individual kata	Ryo Kiyuna; Japan	Damián Quintero; Spain	Mattia Busato; Italy
Team kata	Japan; Arata Kinjo; Ryo Kiyuna; Takuya Uemura	Spain; José Carbonell; Sergio Galán; Francisco Salazar	Iran; Milad Delikhoun; Abolfazl Shahrjerdi; Ali Zand
Team kata	Japan; Arata Kinjo; Ryo Kiyuna; Takuya Uemura	Spain; José Carbonell; Sergio Galán; Francisco Salazar	Italy; Gianluca Gallo; Alessandro Iodice; Giuseppe Panagia
Kumite −60 kg	Angelo Crescenzo; Italy	Naoto Sago; Japan	Darkhan Assadilov; Kazakhstan
Kumite −60 kg	Angelo Crescenzo; Italy	Naoto Sago; Japan	Abdessalam Ameknassi; Morocco
Kumite −67 kg	Steven Da Costa; France	Vinícius Figueira; Brazil	Camilo Velozo; Chile
Kumite −67 kg	Steven Da Costa; France	Vinícius Figueira; Brazil	Hamoun Derafshipour; Iran
Kumite −75 kg	Bahman Asgari; Iran	Luigi Busà; Italy	Ken Nishimura; Japan
Kumite −75 kg	Bahman Asgari; Iran	Luigi Busà; Italy	Rafael Aghayev; Azerbaijan
Kumite −84 kg	Ivan Kvesić; Croatia	Valerii Chobotar; Ukraine	Zabihollah Pourshab; Iran
Kumite −84 kg	Ivan Kvesić; Croatia	Valerii Chobotar; Ukraine	Uğur Aktaş; Turkey
Kumite +84 kg	Jonathan Horne; Germany	Sajjad Ganjzadeh; Iran	Babacar Seck; Spain
Kumite +84 kg	Jonathan Horne; Germany	Sajjad Ganjzadeh; Iran	Alparslan Yamanoğlu; Turkey
Team kumite	Iran; Saleh Abazari; Bahman Asgari; Ali Asghar Asiabari; Sajjad Ganjzadeh; Saman Heidari; Mehdi Khodabakhshi; Zabihollah Pourshab	Turkey; Uğur Aktaş; Erman Eltemur; Samed Gök; Rıdvan Kaptan; Ömer Abdurrahim Özer; Burak Uygur; Alparslan Yamanoğlu	Japan; Daiki Ando; Ryutaro Araga; Hideyoshi Kagawa; Yuta Mori; Ken Nishimura; Yusei Sakiyama; Rikito Shimada
Team kumite	Iran; Saleh Abazari; Bahman Asgari; Ali Asghar Asiabari; Sajjad Ganjzadeh; Saman Heidari; Mehdi Khodabakhshi; Zabihollah Pourshab	Turkey; Uğur Aktaş; Erman Eltemur; Samed Gök; Rıdvan Kaptan; Ömer Abdurrahim Özer; Burak Uygur; Alparslan Yamanoğlu	Italy; Ahmed El Sharaby; Rabia Jendoubi; Nello Maestri; Luca Maresca; Simone Marino; Michele Martina; Andrea Minardi

=== Women ===
Event	Gold	Silver	Bronze
Individual kata	Sandra Sánchez; Spain	Kiyou Shimizu; Japan	Grace Lau; Hong Kong
Individual kata	Sandra Sánchez; Spain	Kiyou Shimizu; Japan	Viviana Bottaro; Italy
Team kata	Japan; Saori Ishibashi; Mai Mugiyama; Sae Taira	Spain; Marta García; Lidia Rodríguez; Raquel Roy	Italy; Sara Battaglia; Terryana D'Onofrio; Michela Pezzetti
Team kata	Japan; Saori Ishibashi; Mai Mugiyama; Sae Taira	Spain; Marta García; Lidia Rodríguez; Raquel Roy	Turkey; Dilara Bozan; Rabia Küsmüş; Gizem Sofuoğlu
Kumite −50 kg	Miho Miyahara; Japan	Serap Özçelik; Turkey	Bettina Plank; Austria
Kumite −50 kg	Miho Miyahara; Japan	Serap Özçelik; Turkey	Sara Bahmanyar; Iran
Kumite −55 kg	Dorota Banaszczyk; Poland	Jana Bitsch; Germany	Wen Tzu-yun; Chinese Taipei
Kumite −55 kg	Dorota Banaszczyk; Poland	Jana Bitsch; Germany	Ivet Goranova; Bulgaria
Kumite −61 kg	Jovana Preković; Serbia	Yin Xiaoyan; China	Btissam Sadini; Morocco
Kumite −61 kg	Jovana Preković; Serbia	Yin Xiaoyan; China	Giana Farouk; Egypt
Kumite −68 kg	Irina Zaretska; Azerbaijan	Victoria Isaeva; Russia	Lamya Matoub; Algeria
Kumite −68 kg	Irina Zaretska; Azerbaijan	Victoria Isaeva; Russia	Miroslava Kopúňová; Slovakia
Kumite +68 kg	Eleni Chatziliadou; Greece	Ayumi Uekusa; Japan	Shymaa Abou-El-Yazed; Egypt
Kumite +68 kg	Eleni Chatziliadou; Greece	Ayumi Uekusa; Japan	Hana Antunovic; Sweden
Team kumite	France; Léa Avazeri; Andréa Brito; Leïla Heurtault; Laura Sivert	Japan; Natsumi Kawamura; Ayaka Saito; Mayumi Someya; Ayumi Uekusa	Spain; Cristina Ferrer; Laura Palacio; María Torres; Cristina Vizcaíno
Team kumite	France; Léa Avazeri; Andréa Brito; Leïla Heurtault; Laura Sivert	Japan; Natsumi Kawamura; Ayaka Saito; Mayumi Someya; Ayumi Uekusa	Egypt; Aisha Abdelrahman; Shymaa Abou-El-Yazed; Feryal Abdelaziz; Giana Farouk

== Medal table ==
Rank	Nation	Gold	Silver	Bronze	Total
1	Japan	4	4	2	10
2	Iran	2	1	4	7
3	France	2	0	0	2
4	Spain	1	3	2	6
5	Italy	1	1	5	7
6	Germany	1	1	0	2
7	Azerbaijan	1	0	1	2
8	Croatia	1	0	0	1
8	Greece	1	0	0	1
8	Poland	1	0	0	1
8	Serbia	1	0	0	1
12	Turkey	0	2	4	6
13	Brazil	0	1	0	1
13	China	0	1	0	1
13	Russia	0	1	0	1
13	Ukraine	0	1	0	1
17	Egypt	0	0	3	3
18	Morocco	0	0	2	2
19	Algeria	0	0	1	1
19	Austria	0	0	1	1
19	Bulgaria	0	0	1	1
19	Chile	0	0	1	1
19	Chinese Taipei	0	0	1	1
19	Hong Kong	0	0	1	1
19	Kazakhstan	0	0	1	1
19	Slovakia	0	0	1	1
19	Sweden	0	0	1	1
Totals (27 entries)		16	16	32	64

== Participating nations ==
1117 athletes from 140 nations competed.

- Albania (3)
- Algeria (16)
- Andorra (1)
- Angola (3)
- Argentina (6)
- Armenia (8)
- Australia (12)
- Austria (13)
- Azerbaijan (15)
- Bangladesh (3)
- Belarus (14)
- Belgium (12)
- Benin (1)
- Bosnia and Herzegovina (14)
- Botswana (2)
- Brazil (16)
- Bulgaria (7)
- Burkina Faso (7)
- Burundi (2)
- Cambodia (2)
- Cameroon (9)
- Canada (14)
- Cape Verde (7)
- Cayman Islands (1)
- Chad (4)
- Chile (7)
- China (12)
- Chinese Taipei (14)
- Colombia (16)
- Congo (7)
- Costa Rica (12)
- Croatia (16)
- Cuba (3)
- Curaçao (2)
- Cyprus (4)
- Czech Republic (10)
- Democratic Republic of the Congo (8)
- Denmark (13)
- Djibouti (1)
- Dominican Republic (14)
- Ecuador (3)
- Egypt (14)
- El Salvador (4)
- England (15)
- Estonia (3)
- Fiji (2)
- Finland (11)
- France (15)
- Gabon (2)
- Georgia (5)
- Germany (14)
- Ghana (5)
- Greece (5)
- Guatemala (10)
- Hong Kong (13)
- Hungary (11)
- Iceland (5)
- India (16)
- Indonesia (12)
- Iran (16)
- Iraq (2)
- Ireland (11)
- Israel (7)
- Italy (15)
- Ivory Coast (11)
- Jamaica (1)
- Japan (16)
- Jordan (10)
- Kazakhstan (14)
- Kosovo (13)
- Kuwait (8)
- Kyrgyzstan (11)
- Latvia (12)
- Lebanon (3)
- Liechtenstein (1)
- Lithuania (8)
- Macau (5)
- Macedonia (13)
- Madagascar (3)
- Malaysia (7)
- Malta (1)
- Mexico (13)
- Moldova (4)
- Montenegro (11)
- Morocco (11)
- Mozambique (8)
- Namibia (4)
- Nepal (5)
- Netherlands (10)
- New Zealand (9)
- Nicaragua (1)
- Nigeria (3)
- Northern Ireland (1)
- Norway (7)
- North Korea (2)
- Oman (4)
- Pakistan (5)
- Palestine (6)
- Panama (10)
- Paraguay (3)
- Peru (15)
- Philippines (3)
- Poland (8)
- Portugal (12)
- Puerto Rico (1)
- Qatar (3)
- Refugee Karate Team (2)
- Romania (15)
- Russia (16)
- San Marino (1)
- Saudi Arabia (7)
- Scotland (7)
- Senegal (10)
- Serbia (16)
- Sierra Leone (1)
- Singapore (1)
- Slovakia (15)
- Slovenia (7)
- South Africa (9)
- South Korea (9)
- Spain (16)
- Sri Lanka (3)
- Sweden (11)
- Switzerland (10)
- Tajikistan (7)
- Thailand (6)
- Timor-Leste (2)
- Trinidad and Tobago (4)
- Tunisia (13)
- Turkey (16)
- Ukraine (14)
- United Arab Emirates (5)
- United States (14)
- Uruguay (4)
- Uzbekistan (10)
- Venezuela (12)
- Vietnam (3)
- Wales (6)
- Yemen (1)
- Zimbabwe (1)
