= Sadriddin Saymatov =

Uzbekistani karateka (born 1997)

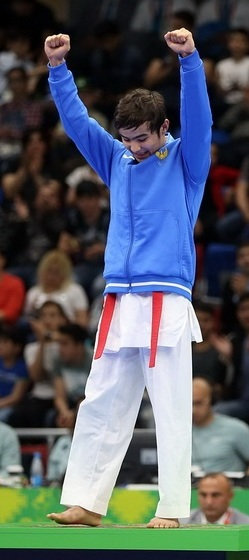
- Saymatov in 2017

Personal information
- Born: 28 July 1997 (age 28)

Sport
- Country: Uzbekistan
- Sport: Karate
- Weight class: 60 kg; 67 kg
- Event: Kumite
Medal record
Men's karate
Representing Uzbekistan
Asian Games
Bronze medal – third place	2018 Jakarta	Kumite 60 kg
Islamic Solidarity Games
Gold medal – first place	2017 Baku	Kumite 60 kg
Gold medal – first place	2021 Konya	Kumite 67 kg
Asian Championships
Gold medal – first place	2019 Tashkent	Kumite 60 kg
Silver medal – second place	2017 Astana	Kumite 60 kg
Bronze medal – third place	2018 Amman	Kumite 60 kg
Bronze medal – third place	2022 Tashkent	Kumite 67 kg
Bronze medal – third place	2022 Tashkent	Team kumite

Sadriddin Saymatov (born 28 July 1997) is an Uzbekistani karateka. He is a two-time gold medalist at the Islamic Solidarity Games. He also won the gold medal in his event at the 2019 Asian Karate Championships.

== Career ==
He won one of the bronze medals in his event at the 2016 World University Karate Championships held in Braga, Portugal.

In 2018, he won one of the bronze medals in the men's kumite 60 kg event at the 2018 Asian Games held in Jakarta, Indonesia.

At the 2019 Asian Karate Championships held in Tashkent, Uzbekistan, he won the gold medal in the men's kumite 60 kg event.

In 2021, he competed at the World Olympic Qualification Tournament held in Paris, France hoping to qualify for the 2020 Summer Olympics in Tokyo, Japan. He was eliminated in his third match by Evgeny Plakhutin.

He won one of the bronze medals in the men's kumite 67 kg event at the 2022 Asian Karate Championships held in Tashkent, Uzbekistan. In 2023, he competed in the men's kumite 67 kg event at the 2022 Asian Games held in Hangzhou, China.

== Achievements ==
Year	Competition	Venue	Rank	Event
2017	Islamic Solidarity Games	Baku, Azerbaijan	1st	Kumite 60 kg
2018	Asian Games	Jakarta, Indonesia	3rd	Kumite 60 kg
2019	Asian Championships	Tashkent, Uzbekistan	1st	Kumite 60 kg
2022	Islamic Solidarity Games	Konya, Turkey	1st	Kumite 67 kg
2022	Asian Championships	Tashkent, Uzbekistan	3rd	Kumite 67 kg
2022	Asian Championships	Tashkent, Uzbekistan	3rd	Team kumite
