= Radwa Sayed =

Egyptian karateka

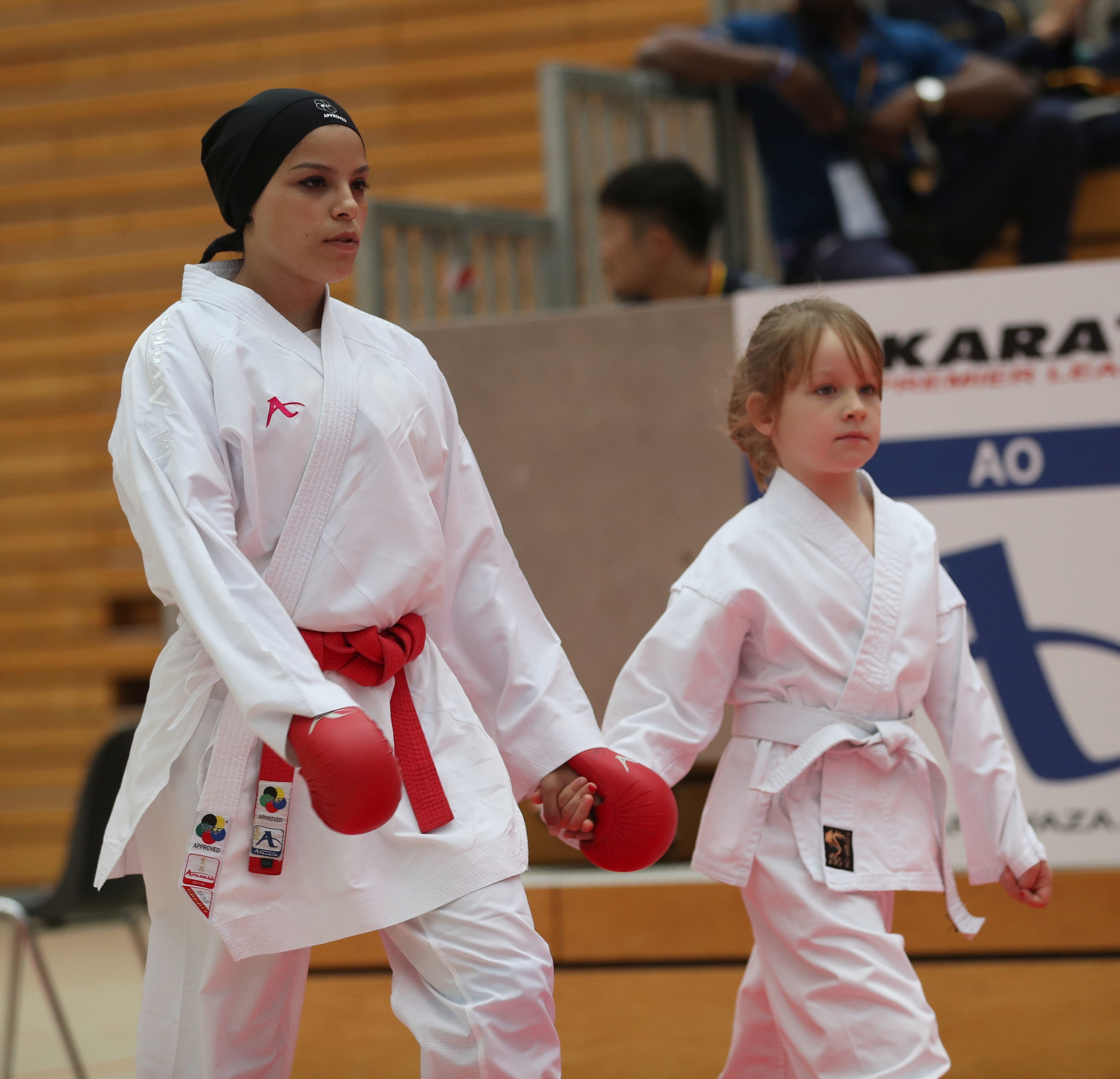
- Radwa Sayed in 2018

Personal information
- Born: May 30, 1997 (age 29)

Sport
- Country: Egypt
- Sport: Karate
- Weight class: 50 kg
- Event: Kumite
Medal record
Women's karate
Representing Egypt
World Championships
Bronze medal – third place	2016 Linz	Kumite 50 kg
African Games
Silver medal – second place	2019 Rabat	Kumite 50 kg
Bronze medal – third place	2015 Brazzaville	Kumite 50 kg

Radwa Sayed is an Egyptian karateka. She is a bronze medalist at the World Karate Championships and a two-time medalist at the African Games. In 2021, she represented Egypt in the women's 55 kg event at the 2020 Summer Olympics held in Tokyo, Japan.

== Career ==
In 2016, she won one of the bronze medals in the women's 50 kg event at the World Karate Championships held in Linz, Austria.

She won the silver medal in her event at the 2019 African Karate Championships held in Gaborone, Botswana. She represented Egypt at the 2019 African Games held in Rabat, Morocco and she won the silver medal in the women's kumite 50 kg event. She also won one of the bronze medals in this event at the 2015 African Games held in Brazzaville, Republic of the Congo.

In 2021, she competed at the World Olympic Qualification Tournament held in Paris, France hoping to qualify for the 2020 Summer Olympics in Tokyo, Japan. She did not qualify at this tournament but she was able to qualify via continental representation soon after. She competed in the women's 55 kg event where she did not advance to compete in the semifinals.

== Achievements ==
Year	Competition	Venue	Rank	Event
2015	African Games	Brazzaville, Republic of the Congo	3rd	Kumite 50 kg
2016	World Championships	Linz, Austria	3rd	Kumite 50 kg
2019	African Games	Rabat, Morocco	2nd	Kumite 50 kg
