= Arata Kinjo =

Japanese karateka

Sport
- Country: Japan
- Sport: Karate
- Event: Team kata
Medal record
Men's karate
Representing Japan
World Championships
Gold medal – first place	2016 Linz	Team kata
Gold medal – first place	2018 Madrid	Team kata
Asian Championships
Gold medal – first place	2015 Yokohama	Team kata
Gold medal – first place	2017 Astana	Team kata
Gold medal – first place	2018 Amman	Team kata
Gold medal – first place	2019 Tashkent	Team kata
Gold medal – first place	2021 Almaty	Team kata
Gold medal – first place	2022 Tashkent	Team kata

Arata Kinjo is a Japanese karateka. He is a two-time gold medalist at the World Karate Championships in the men's team kata event, alongside Ryo Kiyuna and Takuya Uemura. He is also a six-time gold medalist in this event at the Asian Karate Championships.

== Achievements ==
Year	Competition	Venue	Rank	Event
2015	Asian Championships	Yokohama, Japan	1st	Team kata
2016	World Championships	Linz, Austria	1st	Team kata
2017	Asian Championships	Astana, Kazakhstan	1st	Team kata
2018	Asian Championships	Amman, Jordan	1st	Team kata
2018	World Championships	Madrid, Spain	1st	Team kata
2019	Asian Championships	Tashkent, Uzbekistan	1st	Team kata
2021	Asian Championships	Almaty, Kazakhstan	1st	Team kata
2022	Asian Championships	Tashkent, Uzbekistan	1st	Team kata
