= Ayumi Uekusa =

Japanese karateka (born 1992)

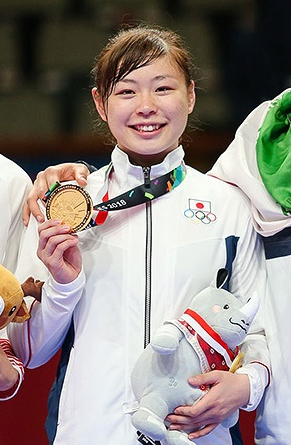
- Uekusa at the 2018 Asian Games

Personal information
- Born: July 25, 1992 (age 33) Yachimata, Chiba Prefecture
- Education: Sports medicine at Teikyo University
- Height: 168 cm (5 ft 6 in)
- Weight: 68 kg (150 lb)

Sport
- Country: Japan
- Sport: Gōjū-ryū Karate
- Event: Kumite
Medal record
Representing Japan
World championships
Bronze medal – third place	2012 Paris	+68 kg
Bronze medal – third place	2012 Paris	Team
Bronze medal – third place	2014 Bremen	+68 kg
Bronze medal – third place	2014 Bremen	Team
Gold medal – first place	2016 Linz	+68 kg
Silver medal – second place	2018 Madrid	+68 kg
Silver medal – second place	2018 Madrid	Team
Asian Games
Bronze medal – third place	2014 Incheon	+68 kg
Gold medal – first place	2018 Jakarta	+68 kg
Asian Championships
Silver medal – second place	2013 Dubai	+68 kg
Bronze medal – third place	2015 Yokohama	+68 kg
Gold medal – first place	2017 Astana	+68 kg
Bronze medal – third place	2017 Astana	Team
Bronze medal – third place	2018 Amman	+68 kg
Gold medal – first place	2022 Tashkent	+68 kg

Ayumi Uekusa (植草 歩, Uekusa Ayumi; born July 25, 1992) is a Japanese karateka. Competing in the +68 kg kumite division she won gold medals at the World Karate Federation's 2016 World Championships, 2017 and 2022 Asian Championships, and at the 2018 Asian Games. She has also won several bronze and silver medals at the World Championships, Asian Championships, and Asian Games.

She won a gold medal at the 2023 Karate 1-Premier League Cairo in January, and after taking gold in the 2023 Karate 1-Premier League Dublin that September, she was awarded the title of "Grand Winner" in her weight division for the year — her fourth such award after 2017, 2018, and 2020.
