= Nancy L. Garcia =

Nancy Lopes Garcia
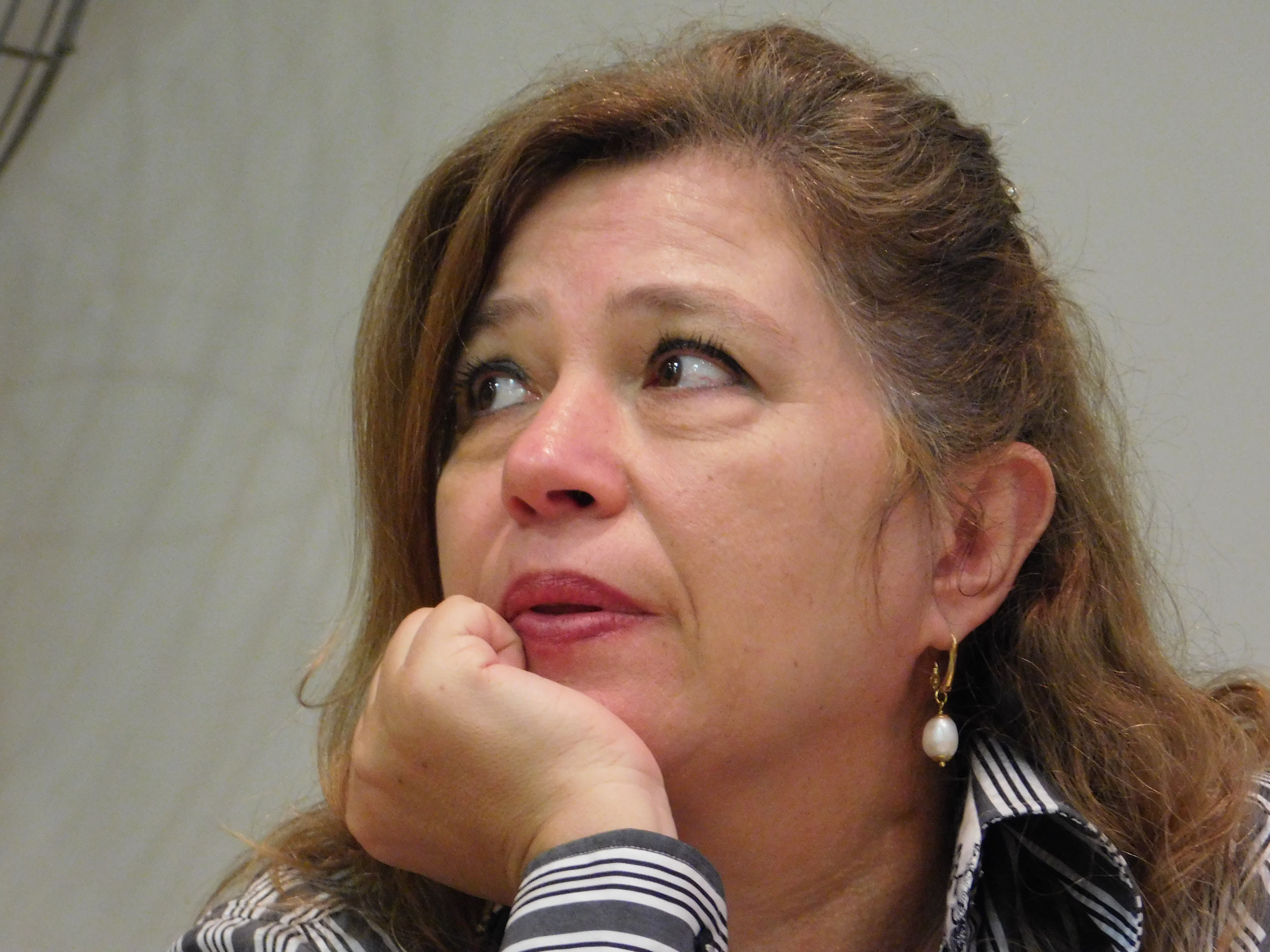
- Nancy Lopes Garcia
- Born: São Paulo, Brazil
- Education: University of Wisconsin at Madison
- Occupations: Statistician, Mathematician, Professor of Statistics
- Employer: University of Campinas
- Awards: Elected Member of the International Statistical Institute

Nancy Lopes Garcia is Professor of Statistics at University of Campinas in Brazil. Her research interests include modeling of and inference for spatial point processes, chains of infinite or variable memory, and inference for functional data.

Garcia got her PhD at the University of Wisconsin at Madison, working with Thomas G. Kurtz. She is an Elected Member of the International Statistical Institute and has published some 50 papers in scientific journals, supervised 6 PhD students and 5 postdocs.

Garcia served as Treasurer and Vice-President of the Brazilian Society of Mathematics.
