= Ken Nishimura =

Japanese karateka (born 1995)

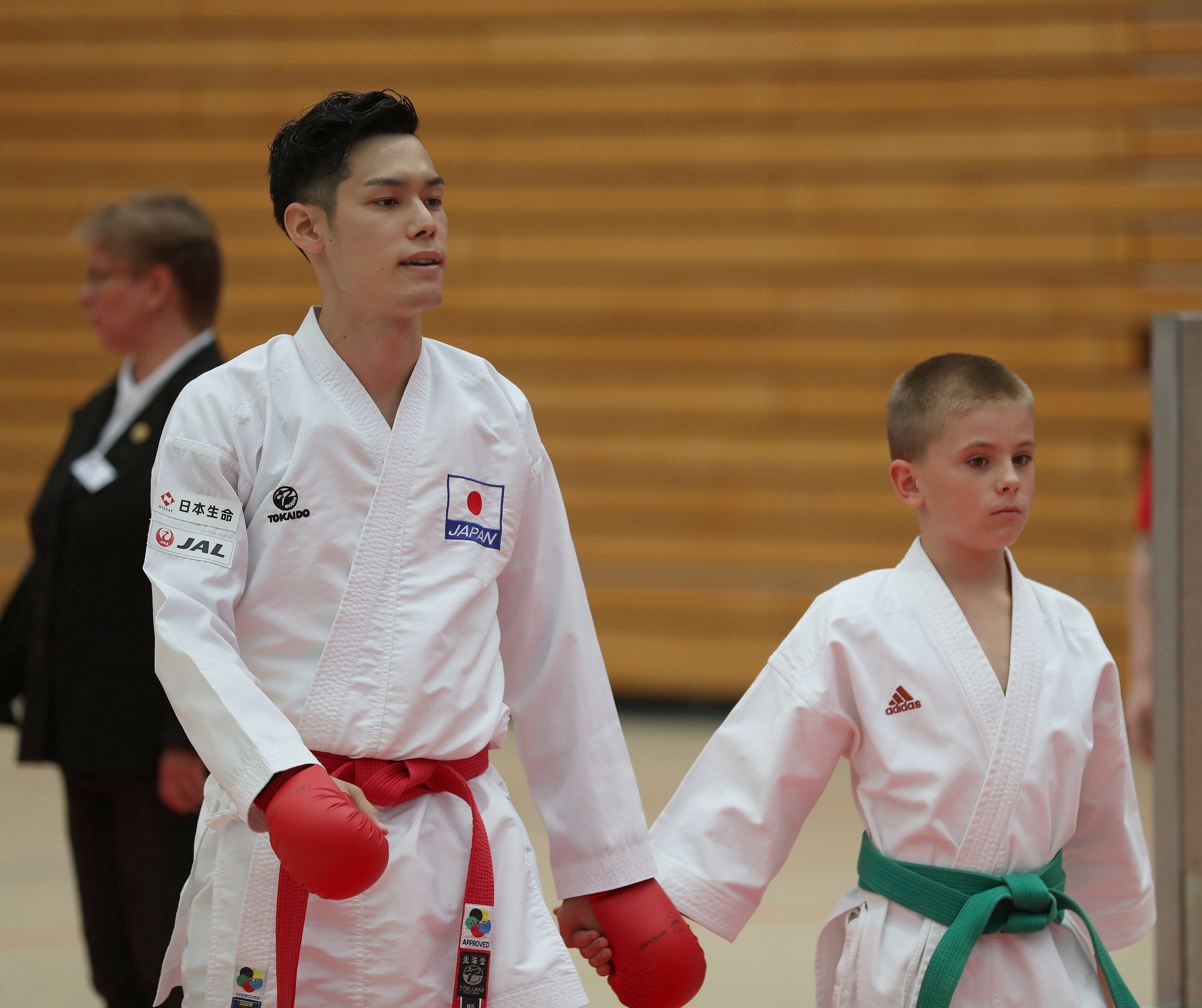
- Nishimura in 2018

Personal information
- Born: 31 December 1995 (age 30)

Sport
- Country: Japan
- Sport: Karate
- Weight class: 75 kg
- Event: Kumite
Medal record
Men's karate
Representing Japan
World Championships
| Silver medal – second place | 2016 Linz | Team kumite |
| Bronze medal – third place | 2018 Madrid | Kumite 75 kg |
| Bronze medal – third place | 2018 Madrid | Team kumite |
Asian Championships
| Gold medal – first place | 2019 Tashkent | Kumite 75 kg |
| Bronze medal – third place | 2017 Astana | Team kumite |
| Bronze medal – third place | 2018 Amman | Team kumite |

Ken Nishimura (Japanese: 西村拳, born 31 December 1995) is a Japanese karateka. He won the gold medal in the men's kumite 75 kg event at the 2019 Asian Karate Championships held in Tashkent, Uzbekistan. He represented Japan at the 2020 Summer Olympics in karate. He competed in the men's 75 kg event where he did not advance to compete in the semifinals.

== Career ==
At the 2016 World University Karate Championships held in Braga, Portugal, he won the silver medal in the men's kumite 75 kg event and the gold medal in the men's team kumite event. A few months later, at the 2016 World Karate Championships held in Linz, Austria, he won the silver medal in the men's team kumite event.

In 2018, he won one of the bronze medals in the men's kumite 75 kg and men's team kumite events at the World Karate Championships held in Madrid, Spain.

== Achievements ==
| Year | Competition | Venue | Rank | Event |
|---|---|---|---|---|
| 2016 | World Championships | Linz, Austria | 2nd | Team kumite |
| 2017 | Asian Championships | Astana, Kazakhstan | 3rd | Team kumite |
| 2018 | Asian Championships | Amman, Jordan | 3rd | Team kumite |
| 2018 | World Championships | Madrid, Spain | 3rd | Kumite 75 kg |
| 2018 | World Championships | Madrid, Spain | 3rd | Team kumite |
| 2019 | Asian Championships | Tashkent, Uzbekistan | 1st | Kumite 75 kg |

== Conviction for sexual abuse ==
On 1 September 2025, Nishimura was sentenced to three years in prison. He had allegedly brought a defenceless, drunk woman to his flat, sexually abused her and recorded it with a digital camera. His own recordings were used as evidence at the trial.
