= Sajjad Ganjzadeh =

Iranian karateka (born 1992)

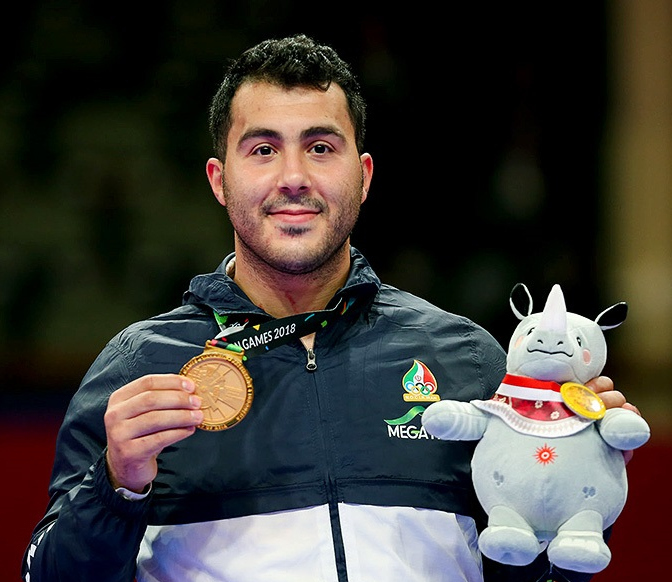
- Ganjzadeh at the 2018 Asian Games

Personal information
- Born: 4 January 1992 (age 34) Tehran, Iran
- Education: Azad University
- Height: 179 cm (5 ft 10 in)
- Weight: 109 kg (240 lb)

Sport
- Country: Iran
- Sport: Karate
- Event: Kumite
Medal record
Representing Iran
Men's Karate
Olympic Games
| Gold medal – first place | 2020 Tokyo | +75 kg |
World Championships
| Gold medal – first place | 2014 Bremen | Team |
| Gold medal – first place | 2016 Linz | +84 kg |
| Gold medal – first place | 2016 Linz | Team |
| Gold medal – first place | 2018 Madrid | Team |
| Silver medal – second place | 2014 Bremen | +84 kg |
| Silver medal – second place | 2018 Madrid | +84 kg |
| Bronze medal – third place | 2012 Paris | Team |
| Bronze medal – third place | 2023 Budapest | +84 kg |
Asian Games
| Gold medal – first place | 2018 Jakarta | +84 kg |
| Gold medal – first place | 2022 Hangzhou | +84 kg |
World Games
| Silver medal – second place | 2017 Wrocław | +84 kg |
Asian Championships
| Gold medal – first place | 2013 Dubai | +84 kg |
| Gold medal – first place | 2013 Dubai | Team |
| Gold medal – first place | 2017 Astana | Team |
| Gold medal – first place | 2018 Amman | Team |
| Gold medal – first place | 2019 Tashkent | Team |
| Silver medal – second place | 2015 Yokohama | +84 kg |
| Silver medal – second place | 2015 Yokohama | Team |
| Silver medal – second place | 2017 Astana | +84 kg |
| Silver medal – second place | 2021 Almaty | Team |
| Bronze medal – third place | 2012 Tashkent | Team |
| Bronze medal – third place | 2019 Tashkent | +84 kg |
| Bronze medal – third place | 2023 Malacca | +84 kg |
Islamic Solidarity Games
| Gold medal – first place | 2017 Baku | +84 kg |

Sajjad Ganjzadeh (Persian: سجاد گنج‌زاده, also Romanized as "Sajjād Ganjzādeh"; born 4 January 1992 in Tehran) is an Iranian karateka. Competing in the above 84 kg kumite division he won gold medals at the 2020 Tokyo Olympics, 2014 and 2016 world championships, 2013 and 2017 Asian championships, and 2018 Asian Games. He has also won multiple awards in competitions within the Karate1 Premier League.

He is the first Iranian karateka to win an Olympic gold medal. He won the gold medal in the men's +75 kg event after being knocked out by an illegal kick from Tareg Hamedi of Saudi Arabia. Hamedi was disqualified and Ganjzadeh won the gold medal.

In 2023, he won one of the bronze medals in his event at the Asian Karate Championships held in Malacca, Malaysia. He won the gold medal in the men's kumite +84 kg event at the 2022 Asian Games held in Hangzhou, China.

== Achievements ==
| Year | Competition | Venue | Rank | Event | | | | | |
|---|---|---|---|---|---|---|---|---|---|
| 2013 | Asian Championship | Dubai, UAE | 1st | Kumite +84 kg | | | | | |
| 2015 | Asian Championship | Yokohama, Japan | 2nd | - | 2018 | World Championships | Madrid, Spain | 2nd | Kumite +84 kg |
| 2018 | 2018 Asian Games | Jakarta, Indonesia | 1st | Kumite +84 kg | | | | | |
| 2019 | Asian Championship | Tashkent, Uzbekistan | 3rd | Kumite +84 kg | | | | | |
| 2019 | Karate1 Premier League | Madrid, Spain | 1st | Kumite +84 kg | | | | | |
| 2019 | Karate1 Premier League | Shanghai, China | 1st | Kumite +84 kg | | | | | |
| 2020 | 2021 Summer Olympics | Tokyo, Japan | 1st | Kumite +84 kg | | | | | |
| 2020 | Karate1 Series A | Santiago, Chile | 1st | Kumite +84 kg | | | | | |
| 2021 | Karate1 Premier League | Istanbul, Turkey | 1st | Kumite +84 kg | | | | | |
| 2021 | Karate1 Premier League | Lisbon, Portugal | 3rd | Kumite +84 kg | | | | | |
| 2023 | Asian Championships | Malacca, Malaysia | 3rd | Kumite +84 kg | | | | | |
| 2024 | Karate World Cup | Pamplona, Spain | 2nd | +84 kg | | | | | |
| 2025 | Marseille Open | France | 1st | +75 kg | | | | | |
