= Zabihollah Pourshab =

Iranian karateka (born 1988)

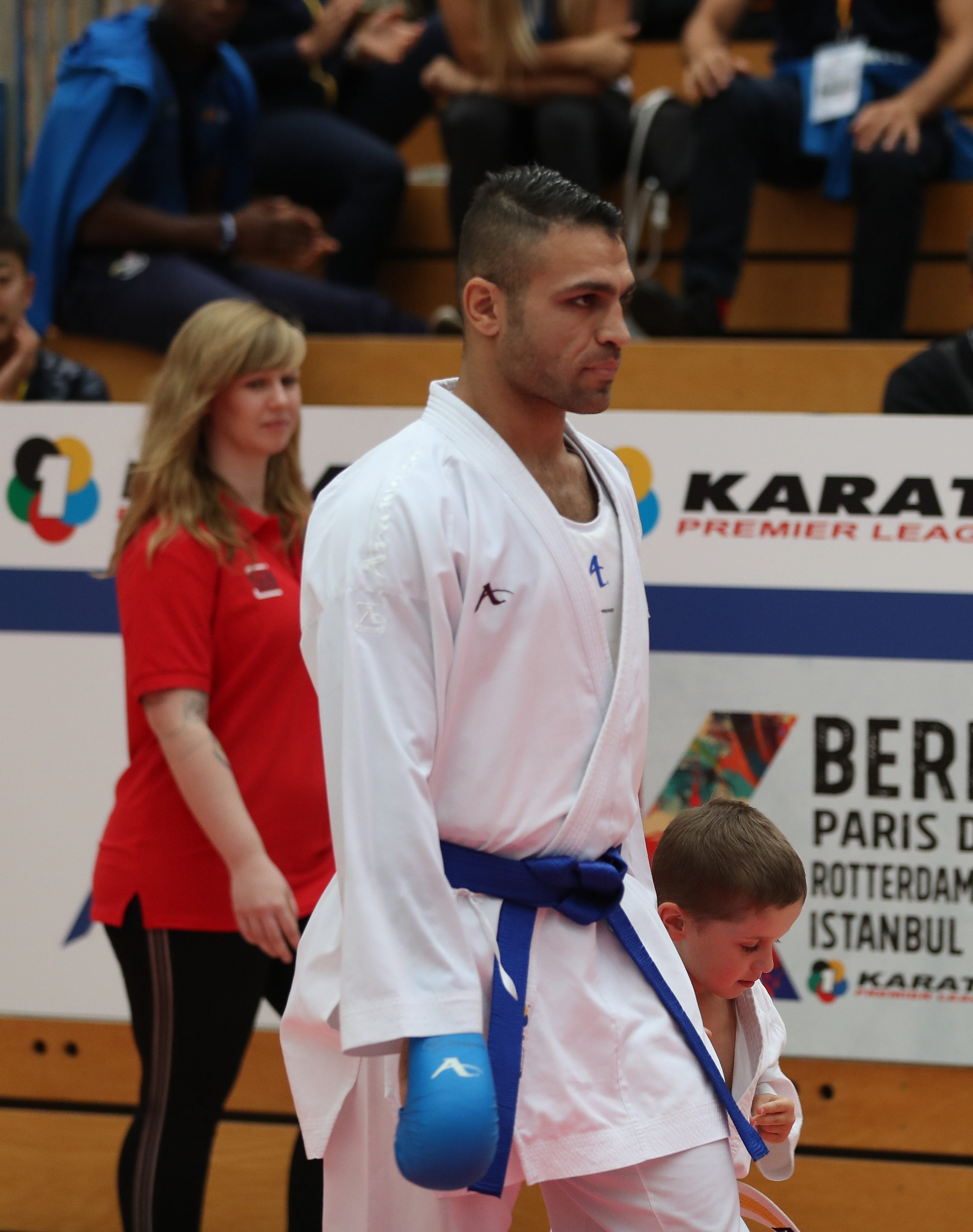
- Zabihollah Pourshab in 2018

Personal information
- Born: 18 July 1988 (age 37) Sirvan, Ilam, Iran
- Height: 181 cm (5 ft 11 in)
- Weight: 86 kg (190 lb)
- Website: Official Instagram Profile

Sport
- Country: Iranian
- Sport: Karate
- Event: Kumite -81kg
Medal record
Representing Iran
Men's Karate
World Championships
Gold medal – first place	2014 Bremen	Team
Gold medal – first place	2016 Linz	Team
Gold medal – first place	2018 Madrid	Team
Bronze medal – third place	2012 Paris	Team
Bronze medal – third place	2016 Linz	84 kg
Bronze medal – third place	2018 Madrid	84 kg
Asian Games
Gold medal – first place	2010 Guangzhou	+84 kg
Bronze medal – third place	2018 Jakarta	84 kg
Asian Championships
Gold medal – first place	2019 Tashkent	+84 kg
Gold medal – first place	2019 Tashkent	Team
Gold medal – first place	2021 Almaty	84 kg
Silver medal – second place	2021 Almaty	Team
World Games
Gold medal – first place	2017 Wrocław	84 kg
Islamic Solidarity Games
Gold medal – first place	2013 Palembang	+84 kg
World Combat Games
Silver medal – second place	2013 St. Petersburg	+84 kg

Zabihollah Pourshab (Persian: ذبیح ‌الله پورشب, born 18 July 1988 in Sirvan) more commonly known as Zabihollah Poursheib is a retired Iranian karateka. Pourshab competed at the 2010 Asian Games at the 84 kg division and won the gold medal. He also won the bronze medal in 2016 World Karate Championships.
