= Abolfazl Shahrjerdi =

Iranian karateka

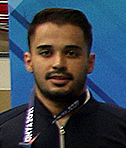

Sport
- Country: Iran
- Sport: Karate
- Event: Kata
Medal record
Men's karate
Representing Iran
World Championships
Bronze medal – third place	2018 Madrid	Team kata
Islamic Solidarity Games
Silver medal – second place	2021 Konya	Individual kata
Bronze medal – third place	2017 Baku	Individual kata
Bronze medal – third place	2021 Konya	Team kata
Asian Championships
Silver medal – second place	2017 Astana	Team kata
Silver medal – second place	2021 Almaty	Team kata
Bronze medal – third place	2019 Tashkent	Team kata
Bronze medal – third place	2021 Almaty	Individual kata
Bronze medal – third place	2023 Malacca	Individual kata
Bronze medal – third place	2025 Tashkent	Team kata

Abolfazl Shahrjerdi is an Iranian karateka competing in the men's kata event. He is a two-time medalist at the Islamic Solidarity Games and a five-time medalist at the Asian Karate Championships. He won one of the bronze medals in the men's team kata event at the 2018 World Karate Championships held in Madrid, Spain.

In 2018, he won the silver medal in the men's kata event at the World University Karate Championships held in Kobe, Japan.

He won the bronze medal in his event at the 2021 Asian Karate Championships held in Almaty, Kazakhstan.

== Achievements ==
Year	Competition	Venue	Rank	Event
2017	Islamic Solidarity Games	Baku, Azerbaijan	3rd	Individual kata
2017	Asian Championships	Astana, Kazakhstan	2nd	Team kata
2018	World Championships	Madrid, Spain	3rd	Team kata
2019	Asian Championships	Tashkent, Uzbekistan	3rd	Team kata
2021	Asian Championships	Almaty, Kazakhstan	3rd	Individual kata
2021	Asian Championships	Almaty, Kazakhstan	2nd	Team kata
2022	Islamic Solidarity Games	Konya, Turkey	2nd	Individual kata
2022	Islamic Solidarity Games	Konya, Turkey	3rd	Team kata
2023	Asian Championships	Malacca, Malaysia	3rd	Individual kata
