= Ali Asghar Asiabari =

Iranian karateka

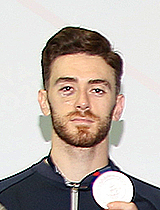

Sport
- Country: Iran
- Sport: Karate
- Weight class: 75 kg
- Events: Kumite; Team kumite
Medal record
Men's karate
Representing Iran
World Championships
Gold medal – first place	2018 Madrid	Team kumite
Bronze medal – third place	2016 Linz	Kumite 75 kg
World Games
Silver medal – second place	2017 Wrocław	Kumite 75 kg
Asian Games
Silver medal – second place	2026 Aichi–Nagoya	Kumite 84 kg
Asian Championships
Gold medal – first place	2017 Astana	Team kumite
Gold medal – first place	2019 Tashkent	Team kumite
Silver medal – second place	2018 Amman	Kumite 75 kg
Silver medal – second place	2026 Bali	Team kumite
Bronze medal – third place	2021 Almaty	Kumite 75 kg
Bronze medal – third place	2026 Bali	Kumite 75 kg
Islamic Solidarity Games
Silver medal – second place	2021 Konya	Kumite 75 kg

Ali Asghar Asiabari is an Iranian karateka. He won the silver medal in the men's kumite 75 kg event at the 2017 World Games in Wrocław, Poland. He won the silver medal in the men's 75 kg event at the 2021 Islamic Solidarity Games held in Konya, Turkey.

== Achievements ==
Year	Competition	Venue	Rank	Event
2016	World Championships	Linz, Austria	3rd	Kumite 75 kg
2017	Asian Championships	Astana, Kazakhstan	1st	Team kumite
2017	World Games	Wrocław, Poland	2nd	Kumite 75 kg
2018	Asian Championships	Amman, Jordan	2nd	Kumite 75 kg
2018	World Championships	Madrid, Spain	1st	Team kumite
2019	Asian Championships	Tashkent, Uzbekistan	1st	Team kumite
2021	Asian Championships	Almaty, Kazakhstan	3rd	Kumite 75 kg
2022	Islamic Solidarity Games	Konya, Turkey	2nd	Kumite 75 kg
