= Shadi Jafarizadeh =

Iranian karateka (born 1993)

Personal information
- Born: Mashhad, Razavi Khorasan Province, Iran
- Height: 1.74 m (5 ft 9 in)
- Weight: 70 kg (154 lb)

Sport
- Country: Iran
- Sport: Karate
- Event(s): Kumite, Kata
- College team: Islamic Azad University
- Coached by: Farokhnaz Arbab

Shadi Jafarizadeh (Persian: شادی جعفری‌زاده;Mashhad) is an Iranian karateka. Jafarizadeh has been a member of the Iranian women's national karate team for 10 years, and she started her career in karate when she was 4 years old. She has championship medals in Asian and World Championships in both Kumite and Kata divisions. Farokhnaz Arbab, the head coach of Iran's women's national karate team, has trained Shadi Jafarizadeh since she was 4 years old. Shadi Jafarizadeh has a first-class national coaching certificate.

== Honors ==
- Gold medal of karate competitions in individual kata of the world championship (wskf style of Japan - 2013)
- Silver medal of karate competition in team kata category of world championship (wskf style of Japan - 2013)
- Bronze medal of karate competition in the committee category of the world championship (wskf style of Japan - 2013)
- Bronze medal of World Karate League (Turkey 2016)
- Silver medal of the World Karate League (France 2019)
- Bronze medal of Asian Karate Championship 2017 - Jordan
- Silver medal of Asian Karate Championship 2019 - Uzbekistan
- Bronze medal of Asian Karate Championship 2021 - Kazakhstan
- Silver medal of Asian Karate Championship 2022 - Uzbekistan
