= Karate at the 2021 SEA Games =

- Venue: Ninh Bình Province Sports Gymnasium
- Location: Ninh Bình, Vietnam
- Dates: 18–20 May 2022

Karate competitions at the 2021 SEA Games took place at Ninh Bình Province Sports Gymnasium in Ninh Bình, Vietnam from 18 to 20 May 2022.

== Medal table ==
* Host nation (Vietnam)

Rank	Nation	Gold	Silver	Bronze	Total
1	Vietnam*	7	2	6	15
2	Indonesia	4	8	2	14
3	Malaysia	4	0	6	10
4	Thailand	0	4	5	9
5	Laos	0	1	0	1
6	Philippines	0	0	8	8
7	Cambodia	0	0	3	3
Totals (7 entries)		15	15	30	60

== Medalists ==
=== Kata ===
Event	Gold	Silver	Bronze
Men's individual	Ahmad Zigi Zaresta Yuda; Indonesia	Phạm Minh Đức; Vietnam	Muhammad Aiqal Asmadie; Malaysia
Men's individual	Ahmad Zigi Zaresta Yuda; Indonesia	Phạm Minh Đức; Vietnam	John Enrico Vasquez; Philippines
Women's individual	Nguyễn Thị Phương; Vietnam	Monsicha Tararattanakul; Thailand	Rebecca Cyril Torres; Philippines
Women's individual	Nguyễn Thị Phương; Vietnam	Monsicha Tararattanakul; Thailand	Krisda Putri Aprilia; Indonesia
Men's team	Indonesia; Albiadi; Andy Tomy Aditya Mardana; Andi Dasril Dwi Dharmawan	Thailand; Nathawut Kanabkaew; Phanudet Khananpao; Pikanet Sukyik	Malaysia; Ivan Oh; Thomson Hoe; Emmanuel Leong
Men's team	Indonesia; Albiadi; Andy Tomy Aditya Mardana; Andi Dasril Dwi Dharmawan	Thailand; Nathawut Kanabkaew; Phanudet Khananpao; Pikanet Sukyik	Vietnam; Lê Hồng Phúc; Giang Việt Anh; Phạm Minh Đức
Women's team	Vietnam; Nguyễn Ngọc Trâm; Lưu Thị Thu Uyên; Nguyễn Thị Phương	Indonesia; Anugerah Nurul Lucky; Dian Monika Nababan; Emilia Sri Hanandyta	Malaysia; Khaw Yee Voon; Chang Sin Yi; Lim Hui Ling
Women's team	Vietnam; Nguyễn Ngọc Trâm; Lưu Thị Thu Uyên; Nguyễn Thị Phương	Indonesia; Anugerah Nurul Lucky; Dian Monika Nababan; Emilia Sri Hanandyta	Philippines; Nicole Erika Dantes; Rebecca Cyril Torres; Sarah Pangilinan

=== Kumite ===
==== Men ====
Event	Gold	Silver	Bronze
−60 kg	Ari Saputra; Indonesia	Võ Văn Hiền; Vietnam	Prem Kumar Selvam; Malaysia
−60 kg	Ari Saputra; Indonesia	Võ Văn Hiền; Vietnam	Jayson Ramil Macaalay Ordoñez; Philippines
−67 kg	Sureeya Sankar Hari Sankar; Malaysia	Tebing Hutapea; Indonesia	Chalermpon Piwlaaiad; Thailand
−67 kg	Sureeya Sankar Hari Sankar; Malaysia	Tebing Hutapea; Indonesia	Đặng Hồng Sơn; Vietnam
−75 kg	Sharmendran Raghonathan; Malaysia	Ignatius Joshua Kandou; Indonesia	Milad Mardas Cheun; Cambodia
−75 kg	Sharmendran Raghonathan; Malaysia	Ignatius Joshua Kandou; Indonesia	Chu Đức Thịnh; Vietnam
−84 kg	Đỗ Thành Nhân; Vietnam	Thodny Phingsamphan; Laos	Ivan Christopher Agustin; Philippines
−84 kg	Đỗ Thành Nhân; Vietnam	Thodny Phingsamphan; Laos	Teerawat Pongsai; Thailand
Team	Malaysia; Geerijaieswaran Pillai Sivanesan; Kathish S. Gnanasekaran; Kueggen Vijaya Kumar; M. Arif Afifuddin Ab Malik; Prem Kumar Selvam; Sharmendran Raghonathan; Sureeya Sankar Hari Sankar	Indonesia; Ari Saputra; Claudio Fernando Nenobesi; Ignatius Joshua Kandou; Nur Halim Arlendi; Sandi Firmansah; Tebing Hutapea	Thailand; Teerapat Kanabkaew; Siwakon Muekthong; Chaiwat Phiandee; Chalermpon Piwlaaiad; Teerawat Pongsai; Puris Saiyasombat; Worakan Soda
Team	Malaysia; Geerijaieswaran Pillai Sivanesan; Kathish S. Gnanasekaran; Kueggen Vijaya Kumar; M. Arif Afifuddin Ab Malik; Prem Kumar Selvam; Sharmendran Raghonathan; Sureeya Sankar Hari Sankar	Indonesia; Ari Saputra; Claudio Fernando Nenobesi; Ignatius Joshua Kandou; Nur Halim Arlendi; Sandi Firmansah; Tebing Hutapea	Vietnam; Chu Đức Thịnh; Đặng Hồng Sơn; Đỗ Thành Nhân; Nguyễn Văn Nhật; Phạm Minh Nhựt; Trần Lê Tấn Đạt; Vũ Anh Quân

==== Women ====
Event	Gold	Silver	Bronze
−50 kg	Shahmalarani Chandran; Malaysia	Chanyanut Chippensuk; Thailand	Sharon Verlina Ririhena; Indonesia
−50 kg	Shahmalarani Chandran; Malaysia	Chanyanut Chippensuk; Thailand	Đinh Thị Hương; Vietnam
−55 kg	Cok Istri Agung Sanistyarani; Indonesia	Pensiput Namkhao; Thailand	Toukta Moukdavong; Laos
−55 kg	Cok Istri Agung Sanistyarani; Indonesia	Pensiput Namkhao; Thailand	Hoàng Thị Mỹ Tâm; Vietnam
−61 kg	Nguyễn Thị Ngoan; Vietnam	Devina Dea; Indonesia	Jamie Lim; Philippines
−61 kg	Nguyễn Thị Ngoan; Vietnam	Devina Dea; Indonesia	Arm Sukkiaw; Thailand
−68 kg	Hồ Thị Thu Hiền; Vietnam	Ceyco Georgia Zefanya; Indonesia	Amirah Syahirah Azlan; Malaysia
−68 kg	Hồ Thị Thu Hiền; Vietnam	Ceyco Georgia Zefanya; Indonesia	Remon Misu; Philippines
+68 kg	Bùi Thị Thảo; Vietnam	Dessyinta Rakawuni Banurea; Indonesia	Soudanihen Vann; Cambodia
+68 kg	Bùi Thị Thảo; Vietnam	Dessyinta Rakawuni Banurea; Indonesia	Kewalin Songklin; Thailand
Team	Vietnam; Hồ Thị Thu Hiền; Hoàng Thị Mỹ Tâm; Nguyễn Thị Ngoan; Trang Cẩm Lành	Indonesia; Ceyco Georgia Zefanya; Cok Istri Agung Sanistyarani; Dessyinta Rakawuni Banurea; Devina Dea; Sharon Verlina Ririhena	Malaysia; Madhuri Poovanesan; Mathivani Murugeesan; Preyancli Santhiran; Siti Nur Azwani Nor Azli
Team	Vietnam; Hồ Thị Thu Hiền; Hoàng Thị Mỹ Tâm; Nguyễn Thị Ngoan; Trang Cẩm Lành	Indonesia; Ceyco Georgia Zefanya; Cok Istri Agung Sanistyarani; Dessyinta Rakawuni Banurea; Devina Dea; Sharon Verlina Ririhena	Philippines; Jamie Lim; Mae Soriano Eso; Remon Misu; Junna Tsukii
