= Berberabe =

Berberabe is a surname from Batangas City, Bantagas. Notable people with the surname include:

- Darlene Berberabe (fl. from 1981), Filipina lawyer
- Stefanie Berberabe (born 2000), American-Filipino basketball player
