= Karate at the 2018 Asian Games – Men's kata =

Karate competition

Men's kata at the 2018 Asian Games
- Venue: Jakarta Convention Center
- Date: 25 August 2018
- Competitors: 14 from 14 nations

Medalists
| gold medal | Ryo Kiyuna | Japan |
| silver medal | Wang Yi-ta | Chinese Taipei |
| bronze medal | Ahmad Zigi Zaresta Yuda | Indonesia |
| bronze medal | Park Hee-jun | South Korea |

The men's individual kata event at the 2018 Asian Games took place on 25 August 2018 at Jakarta Convention Center Plenary Hall, Jakarta, Indonesia.

== Schedule ==
All times are Western Indonesia Time (UTC+07:00)

| Date | Time | Event |
|---|---|---|
| Saturday, 25 August 2018 | 09:00 | 1/8 finals |
| Saturday, 25 August 2018 | 09:00 | Quarterfinals |
| Saturday, 25 August 2018 | 09:00 | Semifinals |
| Saturday, 25 August 2018 | 09:00 | Final of repechage |
| Saturday, 25 August 2018 | 12:00 | Finals |

== Results ==
=== Main bracket ===
1/8 finals
Lim Chee Wei (MAS) | 2
Mohammad Bader (KUW) | 3
Ahmad Zigi Zaresta Yuda (INA) | 5
Marwan Al-Maazmi (UAE) | 0
Parshu Ram Bastola (NEP) | 0
Adham Abdulnasser (QAT) | 5
Niyon Tharindu Sampaya (SRI) | 0
Park Hee-jun (KOR) | 5
Wang Yi-ta (TPE) | 4
Chris Cheng (HKG) | 1
Kuok Kin Hang (MAC) | 5
Dashyaichilyn Bayart (MGL) | 0

Quarterfinals
Mohammad Bader (KUW) | 1
Ahmad Zigi Zaresta Yuda (INA) | 4
Adham Abdulnasser (QAT) | 0
Ryo Kiyuna (JPN) | 5
Park Hee-jun (KOR) | 1
Wang Yi-ta (TPE) | 4
Kuok Kin Hang (MAC) | 5
James delos Santos (PHI) | 0

Semifinals
Ahmad Zigi Zaresta Yuda (INA) | 0
Ryo Kiyuna (JPN) | 5
Wang Yi-ta (TPE) | 3
Kuok Kin Hang (MAC) | 2

Final
Ryo Kiyuna (JPN) | 5
Wang Yi-ta (TPE) | 0

=== Repechage ===
Final of repechage
Chris Cheng (HKG) | 2
Park Hee-jun (KOR) | 3

Bronze medals
Adham Abdulnasser (QAT) | 0
Ahmad Zigi Zaresta Yuda (INA) | 5
Park Hee-jun (KOR) | 4
Kuok Kin Hang (MAC) | 1
