= Antonio Díaz (karateka) =

Venezuelan karateka (born 1980)

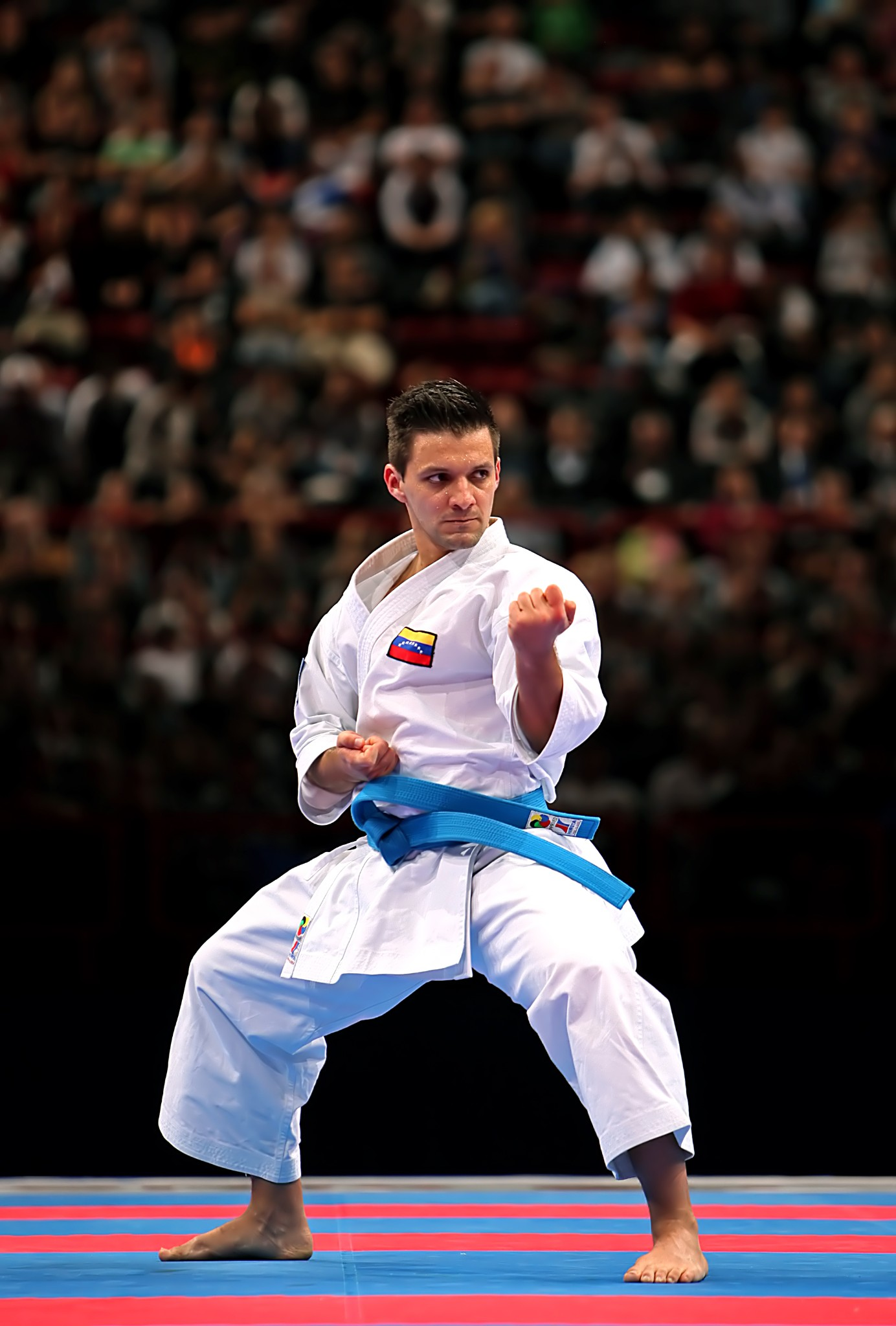
- Díaz at the Paris 2012 WKF Championships

Personal information
- Full name: Antonio José Díaz Fernández
- Born: June 12, 1980 (age 46) Caracas, Venezuela
Medal record
Men's karate
Representing Venezuela
World Karate Championships
Gold medal – first place	Paris 2012	kata
Gold medal – first place	Belgrade 2010	kata
Silver medal – second place	Tokyo 2008	kata
Bronze medal – third place	Linz 2016	kata
Bronze medal – third place	Bremen 2014	kata
Bronze medal – third place	Tampere 2006	kata
Bronze medal – third place	Monterrey 2004	kata
Bronze medal – third place	Madrid 2002	kata
World Games
Gold medal – first place	2013 Cali	kata
Gold medal – first place	2005 Duisburg	kata
Bronze medal – third place	2017 Wrocław	kata
Bronze medal – third place	2009 Kaohsiung	kata
Bronze medal – third place	2001 Akita	kata
Pan American Games
Gold medal – first place	2003 Santo Domingo	Kata
Gold medal – first place	2019 Lima	Kata
Silver medal – second place	1999 Winnipeg	Kata
PKF Senior Championships
Gold medal – first place	Santiago 2018	kata
Gold medal – first place	Curazao 2017	kata
Gold medal – first place	Rio de Janeiro 2016	kata
Gold medal – first place	Toronto 2015	kata
Gold medal – first place	Lima 2014	kata
Gold medal – first place	Buenos Aires 2013	kata
Gold medal – first place	Managua 2012	kata
Gold medal – first place	Guadalajara 2011	kata
Gold medal – first place	Quito 2010	kata
Gold medal – first place	Curazao 2009	kata
Gold medal – first place	Caracas 2008	kata
Gold medal – first place	Santo Domingo 2006	kata
Gold medal – first place	Buenos Aires 2005	kata
Gold medal – first place	San Salvador 2004	kata
Gold medal – first place	Santo Domingo 2003	kata
Gold medal – first place	Havana 1999	kata
Silver medal – second place	Panama City 2019	kata
Silver medal – second place	Carolina 2002	kata
Bronze medal – third place	Mexico City 2007	kata
Bronze medal – third place	San Salvador 2001	kata
Bronze medal – third place	Santiago 2000	kata
Bronze medal – third place	Santiago de los Caballeros 1998	kata

Antonio José Díaz Fernández (born June 12, 1980) is a Venezuelan karateka. He is best known for winning gold medals in kata at the World Championships in Serbia (2010) and France (2012), winning of the World Games in Cali, Colombia (2013), and Duisburg, Germany (2015), and a silver medal in the World Championships in Japan 2008. He won bronze medals at the WKF World Championships in karate in 2002, 2004, 2006, 2014, and 2016 in the men's individual kata. He has also won 23 Pan American Karate Federation Senior Championships Medals 23 times to date.

He represented Venezuela at the 2020 Summer Olympics in Tokyo, Japan. He lost his bronze medal match in the men's kata event. Díaz obtained an Olympic diploma.

Antonio Díaz holds the Guinness world record for the most medals won at World Karate Championships.

== Karate ==
Díaz practices the style of Shito-ryu.

=== Early years ===
Diaz's first achievement was reaching gold at the 5th Young Pan American Karate Do Championship back in 1993 in Salinas, Puerto Rico.

Diaz won his first Olympic Cycle competition at the 1998 Central American and Caribbean Games held in Maracaibo, Venezuela. Nowadays, Diaz holds the following medals in Olympic Cycle competitions: three gold medals at the Bolivarian Games, five at the South American Games, six at the Central American and Caribbean Games, and one gold and one silver at the Pan American Games.

He participated at the Young WKF World Championship in 1999 in Sofia, Bulgaria, where finished ninth.

Diaz has participated at the PKF Pan American Championship since 1998 achieving gold 16 times and reaching the podium in every edition.

Diaz has two gold medals and three bronze ones achieved at the World Games. He finished at the third place at the 2017 edition.

He won the two first staging of the Premier League Karate1 in 2011 and 2012.

=== Karate World Championships ===
The Karate World Championships are the highest level of competition for karate organised by the World Karate Federation. Antonio Diaz has reached the podium in the kata category eight times. He has won the gold twice, holding the world champion title.

Tokyo 2008 was his first time at the final round. He earned the silver medal after losing a tight battle against Luca Valdesi with the score 3–2. His first gold medal would come two years later in Belgrade 2010 against Valdesi with the score 4–1.

In Paris 2012 he was World Champion again. Moreover, he finished with the perfect score of 5-0 all his encounters, an unprecedented situation in the competition. The final competition was against the local karateka Minh Dack.

The 2014 championship held in Bremen, Germany, was not easy for Diaz. He encountered at first round Mattia Busato, who was the European champion at that time. Nevertheless, he won with the tight score 3–2. He fell in quarter finals against the German Ilja Smorguner.

He reached the podium in Linz 2016. This time he lost in semi-finals against Ryo Kiyuna with a 3–2 score, but he won the repechage with a 5–0 score against the Malaysian W. Lim Chee.

In the 2018 World Championship held in Madrid, Diaz lost his semifinal round to Spain's Damian Quintero 0–5.

== Records ==
He won the 2012 World Karate Championships with a perfect score of 5–0 in every competition.

Díaz is the only athlete that has been in the podium eight times in a row at the World Karate Championships. This record comprises his medals from 2002 to 2016. Thanks to this accomplishment, he was included in the Guinness World Records.

He is the only American athlete that has reached 22 individual Pan-American medals. He won a medal in every competition. Additionally, between January 2010 and August 2012, he did not lose any international encounter. He kept the first place at the WKF ranking for 4 consecutive years.

== Rivalries ==
=== Luca Valdesi ===
Between 2001 and 2012, Diaz encountered 19 times the Italian Luca Valdesi. Diaz won 9 times; their last encounter was during the Germany 2012 Premier League.

=== Ryo Kiyuna ===
Ryo Kiyuna is the current world champion in the kata category. He has encountered Diaz 6 times; Diaz won five of these occasions.

== Personal life ==
Diaz holds a Bachelor of Science in Communication with a Major in Advertisement by the Caracas-based Andrés Bello Catholic University. He also holds a Certified Strength and Conditioning Coach qualification by the US-based National Strength Conditioning Association.

Olympic Games
Preceded by Rubén Limardo	Flagbearer for Venezuela (with Karen León); Tokyo 2020	Succeeded by Incumbent
