= Karate at the 2022 Asian Games – Men's kata =

Karate competition

Men's kata at the 2022 Asian Games
- Venue: Linping Sports Centre Gymnasium
- Date: 5 October 2023
- Competitors: 13 from 13 nations

Medalists
gold medal	Kazumasa Moto	Japan
silver medal	Kuok Kin Hang	Macau
bronze medal	Park Hee-jun	South Korea
bronze medal	Salman Al-Mosawi	Kuwait

The men's individual kata event at the 2022 Asian Games took place on 5 October 2023 at Linping Sports Centre Gymnasium, Hangzhou, China.

== Schedule ==
All times are China Standard Time (UTC+08:00)

Date	Time	Event
Thursday, 5 October 2023	08:30	Round 1
Thursday, 5 October 2023	08:30	Round 2
Thursday, 5 October 2023	14:00	Finals

== Results ==
Legend

- DNS — Did not start

=== Round 1 ===
==== Pool 1 ====
Rank	Athlete	Score
1	Chen Chao-ching (TPE)	41.6
2	Kuok Kin Hang (MAC)	40.7
3	Chris Cheng (HKG)	40.4
4	Binar Mustafa (IRQ)	39.7
5	Ahmad Zigi Zaresta Yuda (INA)	38.8
6	Younes Ahmadi (AFG)	35.0
—	Md Hasan Khan (BAN)	DNS

==== Pool 2 ====
Rank	Athlete	Score
1	Kazumasa Moto (JPN)	42.9
2	Salman Al-Mosawi (KUW)	41.6
3	Park Hee-jun (KOR)	41.6
4	Phạm Minh Đức (VIE)	40.0
5	Sonim Manandhar (NEP)	38.3
6	Adham Abdulnasser (QAT)	38.0

=== Round 2 ===
==== Pool 1 ====
Rank	Athlete	Score
1	Kuok Kin Hang (MAC)	41.5
2	Chris Cheng (HKG)	40.5
3	Binar Mustafa (IRQ)	39.9
4	Chen Chao-ching (TPE)	39.7

==== Pool 2 ====
Rank	Athlete	Score
1	Kazumasa Moto (JPN)	43.5
2	Salman Al-Mosawi (KUW)	41.6
3	Park Hee-jun (KOR)	41.3
4	Phạm Minh Đức (VIE)	39.6

=== Medal contests ===
==== Bronze medal match 1 ====
Rank	Athlete	Score
1	Park Hee-jun (KOR)	42.6
2	Chris Cheng (HKG)	41.6

==== Bronze medal match 2 ====
Rank	Athlete	Score
1	Salman Al-Mosawi (KUW)	41.4
2	Binar Mustafa (IRQ)	40.0

==== Gold medal contest ====
Rank	Athlete	Score
1	Kazumasa Moto (JPN)	43.0
2	Kuok Kin Hang (MAC)	39.8
