= Chinese Taipei at the 2019 World Beach Games =

- Flag of Chinese Taipei
- IOC code: TPE

in Doha, Qatar 12 October 2019 – 16 October 2019
- Medals Ranked 23rd: Gold 0 Silver 1 Bronze 0 Total 1

World Beach Games appearances
- 2019; 2023

Chinese Taipei competed at the inaugural World Beach Games in Doha, Qatar from 12 to 16 October 2019. In total, athletes representing Chinese Taipei won one silver medal and the country finished in 23rd place in the medal table.

== Medal summary ==
Medals by sport
Sport	1st place, gold medalist(s)	2nd place, silver medalist(s)	3rd place, bronze medalist(s)	Total
Karate kata	0	1	0	1

=== Medalists ===
Medal	Name	Sport	Event
Silver	Wang Yi-ta	Karate kata	Men's individual kata
