= Ryo Kiyuna =

Japanese karateka (born 1990)

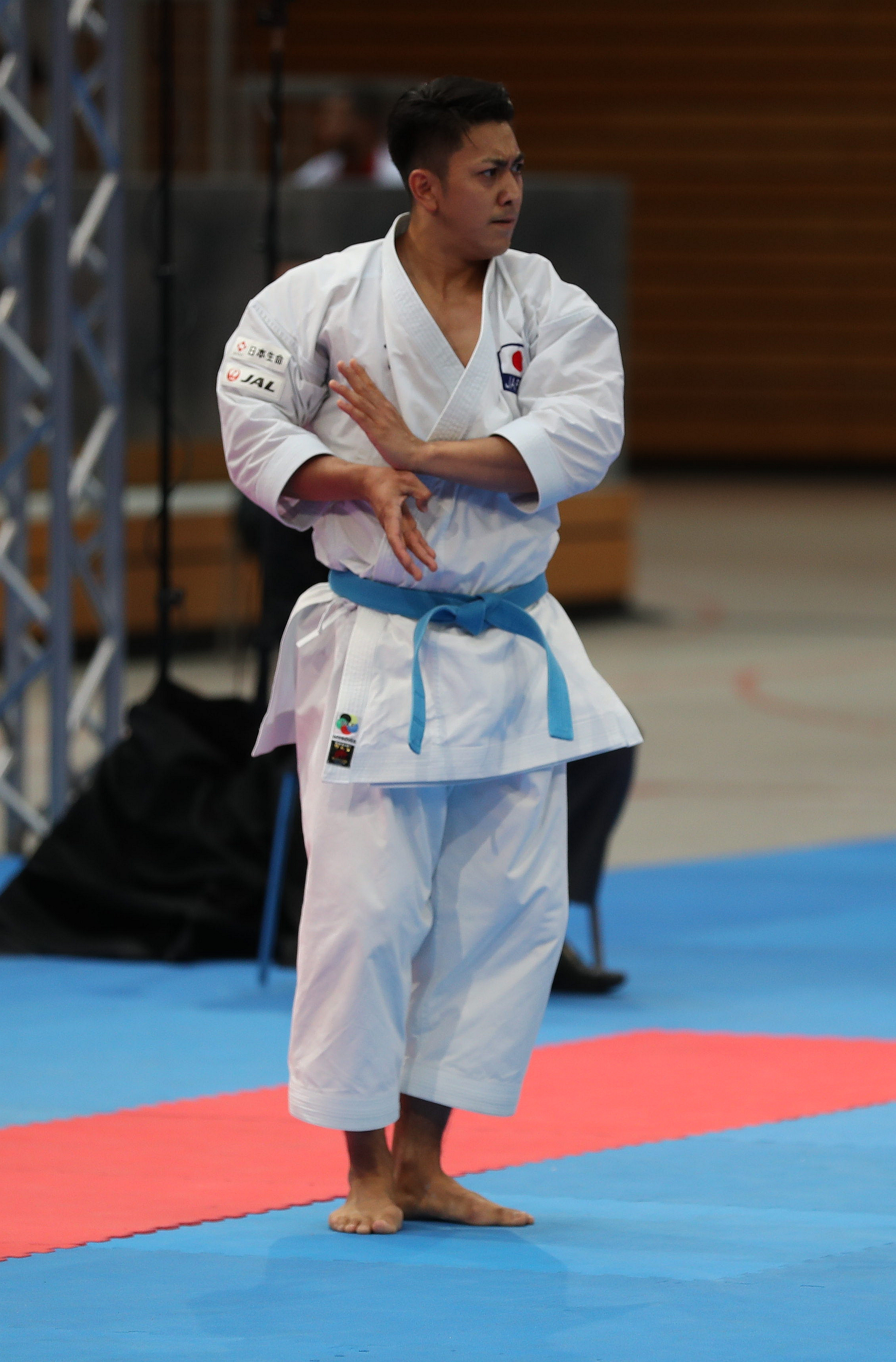
- Kiyuna in 2018

Personal information
- Born: 12 July 1990 (age 35) Okinawa, Japan

Sport
- Country: Japan
- Sport: Karate
- Events: Individual kata; Team kata
Medal record
Men's karate
Representing Japan
Summer Olympics
Gold medal – first place	2020 Tokyo	Individual kata
World Championships
Gold medal – first place	2014 Bremen	Individual kata
Gold medal – first place	2016 Linz	Individual kata
Gold medal – first place	2018 Madrid	Individual kata
Gold medal – first place	2021 Dubai	Individual kata
Gold medal – first place	2016 Linz	Team kata
Gold medal – first place	2018 Madrid	Team kata
Bronze medal – third place	2012 Paris	Individual kata
Asian Championships
Gold medal – first place	2015 Yokohama	Individual kata
Gold medal – first place	2017 Astana	Individual kata
Gold medal – first place	2018 Amman	Individual kata
Gold medal – first place	2019 Tashkent	Individual kata
Gold medal – first place	2021 Almaty	Individual kata
Gold medal – first place	2015 Yokohama	Team kata
Gold medal – first place	2017 Astana	Team kata
Gold medal – first place	2018 Amman	Team kata
Gold medal – first place	2019 Tashkent	Team kata
Gold medal – first place	2021 Almaty	Team kata
Gold medal – first place	2022 Tashkent	Team kata
Bronze medal – third place	2013 Dubai	Individual kata
Asian Games
Gold medal – first place	2018 Jakarta	Individual kata
World Games
Gold medal – first place	2017 Wrocław	Individual kata
Bronze medal – third place	2013 Cali	Individual kata
World Combat Games
Silver medal – second place	2013 Saint Petersburg	Individual kata

Ryo Kiyuna (喜友名諒, Kiyuna Ryō, born 12 July 1990) is an Okinawan karateka. He won the gold medal in the men's kata event at the 2020 Summer Olympics in Tokyo, Japan. He is also a four-time gold medalist in the men's kata event at the World Karate Championships and a two-time gold medalist in the men's team kata event, alongside Arata Kinjo and Takuya Uemura. He has also won multiple gold medals in both the individual and team kata events at the Asian Karate Championships.

== Career ==
At the 2012 World Karate Championships held in Paris, France, Kiyuna won one of the bronze medals in the men's individual kata event. The following year, he represented Japan at the 2013 World Games in Cali, Colombia and he won the bronze medal in the men's kata event.

In 2014, at the World Karate Championships held in Bremen, Germany, Kiyuna won the gold medal in the men's individual kata event. At the 2016 World Karate Championships held in Linz, Austria, he won the gold medal in both the men's individual and men's team kata events. In 2017, Kiyuna won the gold medal in the men's kata event at the World Games held in Wrocław, Poland. In the final, he defeated Damián Quintero of Spain.

At the 2018 Asian Karate Championships held in Amman, Jordan, Kiyuna won the gold medal in the men's kata event. A month later, he won the gold medal in the men's kata event at the 2018 Asian Games held in Jakarta, Indonesia. In the final, he defeated Wang Yi-ta of Taiwan. In 2019, at the Asian Karate Championships held in Tashkent, Uzbekistan, he won the gold medal in both the men's individual kata and men's team kata events.

Kiyuna represented Japan at the 2020 Summer Olympics in Tokyo, Japan. He won the gold medal in the men's kata event, becoming Japan's first gold medalist from Okinawa. In the final, he defeated Damián Quintero of Spain. He was also the flag bearer for Japan during the closing ceremony. A few months after the Olympics, he won the gold medal in the men's kata event at the 2021 World Karate Championships held in Dubai, United Arab Emirates. In December 2021, he won the gold medal in both the men's individual and men's team kata events at the Asian Karate Championships held in Almaty, Kazakhstan.

== Personal life ==
He studied at Okinawa International University. In December 2020, he contracted COVID-19.

Kiyuna's mother died in 2019 at the age of 57. At the gold medal ceremony for kata at the Tokyo 2020 Olympics, Kiyuna paid tribute to his mother's support by carrying a framed picture of her during the proceedings.

== Achievements ==
Year	Competition	Venue	Rank	Event
2012	World Championships	Paris, France	3rd	Individual kata
2013	World Games	Cali, Colombia	3rd	Individual kata
2013	World Combat Games	Saint Petersburg, Russia	2nd	Individual kata
2013	Asian Championships	Dubai, United Arab Emirates	3rd	Individual kata
2014	World Championships	Bremen, Germany	1st	Individual kata
2015	Asian Championships	Yokohama, Japan	1st	Individual kata
2015	Asian Championships	Yokohama, Japan	1st	Team kata
2016	World Championships	Linz, Austria	1st	Individual kata
2016	World Championships	Linz, Austria	1st	Team kata
2017	Asian Championships	Astana, Kazakhstan	1st	Individual kata
2017	Asian Championships	Astana, Kazakhstan	1st	Team kata
2017	World Games	Wrocław, Poland	1st	Individual kata
2018	Asian Championships	Amman, Jordan	1st	Individual kata
2018	Asian Championships	Amman, Jordan	1st	Team kata
2018	Asian Games	Jakarta, Indonesia	1st	Individual kata
2018	World Championships	Madrid, Spain	1st	Individual kata
2018	World Championships	Madrid, Spain	1st	Team kata
2019	Asian Championships	Tashkent, Uzbekistan	1st	Individual kata
2019	Asian Championships	Tashkent, Uzbekistan	1st	Team kata
2021	Summer Olympics	Tokyo, Japan	1st	Individual kata
2021	World Championships	Dubai, United Arab Emirates	1st	Individual kata
2021	Asian Championships	Almaty, Kazakhstan	1st	Individual kata
2021	Asian Championships	Almaty, Kazakhstan	1st	Team kata
2022	Asian Championships	Tashkent, Uzbekistan	1st	Team kata
