= Ivan Oh =

Malaysian karateka

Sport
- Country: Malaysia
- Sport: Karate
- Event: Team kata
Medal record
Men's karate
Representing Malaysia
Asian Championships
| Silver medal – second place | 2018 Amman | Team kata |
| Silver medal – second place | 2019 Tashkent | Team kata |
Southeast Asian Games
| Gold medal – first place | 2019 Philippines | Team kata |
| Bronze medal – third place | 2021 Hanoi | Team kata |

Ivan Oh is a Malaysian karateka. At the 2019 Southeast Asian Games, he won the gold medal in the men's team kata event, alongside Emmanuel Leong and Thomson Hoe. He is coached by Ku Jin Keat who won the gold medal in the men's kata event at the 2010 Asian Games.

In 2019, he also won the silver medal in the men's team kata event at the 2019 Asian Karate Championships held in Tashkent, Uzbekistan.

== Achievements ==
| Year | Competition | Venue | Rank | Event |
|---|---|---|---|---|
| 2018 | Asian Championships | Amman, Jordan | 2nd | Team kata |
| 2019 | Asian Championships | Tashkent, Uzbekistan | 2nd | Team kata |
| 2019 | Southeast Asian Games | Manila, Philippines | 1st | Team kata |
| 2022 | Southeast Asian Games | Hanoi, Vietnam | 3rd | Team kata |
