= Emmanuel Leong =

Malaysian karateka

Personal information
- Full name: Emmanuel Leong Theng Kuang

Sport
- Country: Malaysia
- Sport: Karate
- Event: Team kata
Medal record
Men's karate
Representing Malaysia
World Championships
Bronze medal – third place	2014 Bremen	Team kata
Asian Championships
Silver medal – second place	2015 Yokohama	Team kata
Silver medal – second place	2018 Amman	Team kata
Silver medal – second place	2019 Tashkent	Team kata
Bronze medal – third place	2013 Dubai	Team kata
Bronze medal – third place	2017 Astana	Team kata
Southeast Asian Games
Gold medal – first place	2013 Naypyidaw	Team kata
Gold medal – first place	2017 Kuala Lumpur	Team kata
Gold medal – first place	2019 Philippines	Team kata
Bronze medal – third place	2021 Hanoi	Team kata

Emmanuel Leong is a Malaysian karateka. At the 2019 Southeast Asian Games he won the gold medal in the men's team kata event, alongside Thomson Hoe and Ivan Oh.

He is coached by Ku Jin Keat who won the gold medal in the men's kata event at the 2010 Asian Games.
