= Prem Kumar Selvam =

Malaysian karateka (born 1994)

Personal information
- Born: 10 January 1994 (age 32)

Sport
- Country: Malaysia
- Sport: Karate
- Weight class: 55 kg; 60 kg
- Event: Kumite
Medal record
Men's karate
Representing Malaysia
Asian Games
Bronze medal – third place	2018 Jakarta	Kumite 60 kg
Asian Championships
Bronze medal – third place	2018 Amman	Kumite 55 kg
Bronze medal – third place	2019 Tashkent	Kumite 55 kg
Bronze medal – third place	2022 Tashkent	Kumite 55 kg
Bronze medal – third place	2023 Malacca	Kumite 55 kg
Southeast Asian Games
Gold medal – first place	2019 Philippines	Kumite 55 kg
Gold medal – first place	2023 Phnom Penh	Kumite 55 kg
Silver medal – second place	2023 Phnom Penh	Team kumite
Bronze medal – third place	2017 Kuala Lumpur	Kumite 55 kg
Bronze medal – third place	2017 Kuala Lumpur	Team kumite
Bronze medal – third place	2021 Hanoi	Kumite 60 kg

Prem Kumar Selvam (born 10 January 1994) is a Malaysian karateka. He won the gold medal in the men's kumite 55 kg event at the 2019 Southeast Asian Games held in the Philippines. Two years earlier, he won bronze in this event. He is also a bronze medalist at the Asian Games and a four-time bronze medalist at the Asian Karate Championships.

== Career ==
In 2018, he won one of the bronze medals in the men's kumite 60 kg event at the Asian Games held in Jakarta, Indonesia.

He also won one of the bronze medals in the men's kumite 55 kg event at the 2018 Asian Karate Championships held in Amman, Jordan. At the 2019 Asian Karate Championships held in Tashkent, Uzbekistan, he won one of the bronze medals in the men's kumite 55 kg event.

In 2021, he competed at the World Olympic Qualification Tournament held in Paris, France hoping to qualify for the 2020 Summer Olympics in Tokyo, Japan.

He won one of the bronze medals in the men's kumite 55 kg event at the 2022 Asian Karate Championships held in Tashkent, Uzbekistan.

In 2023, he won the gold medal in his event at the SEA Games held in Phnom Penh, Cambodia. He also won the silver medal in the men's team kumite event. He won one of the bronze medals in his event at the 2023 Asian Karate Championships held in Malacca, Malaysia.

== Achievements ==
Year	Competition	Venue	Rank	Event
2017	Southeast Asian Games	Kuala Lumpur, Malaysia	3rd	Kumite 55 kg
2017	Southeast Asian Games	Kuala Lumpur, Malaysia	3rd	Team kumite
2018	Asian Championships	Amman, Jordan	3rd	Kumite 55 kg
2018	Asian Games	Jakarta, Indonesia	3rd	Kumite 60 kg
2019	Asian Championships	Tashkent, Uzbekistan	3rd	Kumite 55 kg
2019	Southeast Asian Games	Manila, Philippines	1st	Kumite 55 kg
2022	Southeast Asian Games	Hanoi, Vietnam	3rd	Kumite 60 kg
2022	Asian Championships	Tashkent, Uzbekistan	3rd	Kumite 55 kg
2023	Southeast Asian Games	Phnom Penh, Cambodia	1st	Kumite 55 kg
2023	Southeast Asian Games	Phnom Penh, Cambodia	2nd	Team kumite
2023	Asian Championships	Malacca, Malaysia	3rd	Kumite 55 kg
