= Karate at the 2018 Asian Games – Women's kumite 55 kg =

Karate competition

Women's kumite 55 kg at the 2018 Asian Games
- Venue: Jakarta Convention Center
- Date: 26 August 2018
- Competitors: 15 from 15 nations

Medalists
gold medal	Wen Tzu-yun	Chinese Taipei
silver medal	Taravat Khaksar	Iran
bronze medal	Cok Istri Agung Sanistyarani	Indonesia
bronze medal	Wong Sok I	Macau

The women's kumite 55 kilograms competition at the 2018 Asian Games took place on 26 August 2018 at Jakarta Convention Center Plenary Hall, Jakarta, Indonesia.

== Schedule ==
All times are Western Indonesia Time (UTC+07:00)

Date	Time	Event
Sunday, 26 August 2018	09:00	1/8 finals
Sunday, 26 August 2018	09:00	Quarterfinals
Sunday, 26 August 2018	09:00	Semifinals
Sunday, 26 August 2018	09:00	Final of repechage
Sunday, 26 August 2018	12:00	Finals

== Results ==
=== Main bracket ===
1/8 finals
Cok Istri Agung Sanistyarani (INA)	5
Tippawan Khamsi (THA)	1
Latifa Haidare (AFG)	0
Taravat Khaksar (IRI)	9
Ma Man Sum (HKG)	1
Ding Jiamei (CHN)	2
Aigerim Prieva (KGZ)	0
Ahn Tae-eun (KOR)	0
Fatima Al-Shawabkeh (JOR)	1
Mae Soriano (PHI)	2
Sukhrob Gulosori (TJK)	2
Wong Sok I (MAC)	4
Wen Tzu-yun (TPE)	1
Syakilla Salni (MAS)	1

Quarterfinals
Cok Istri Agung Sanistyarani (INA)	1
Taravat Khaksar (IRI)	1
Ding Jiamei (CHN)	0
Aigerim Prieva (KGZ)	0
Mae Soriano (PHI)	1
Wong Sok I (MAC)	3
Wen Tzu-yun (TPE)	1
Sabina Zakharova (KAZ)	0

Semifinals
Taravat Khaksar (IRI)	5
Ding Jiamei (CHN)	1
Wong Sok I (MAC)	1
Wen Tzu-yun (TPE)	4

Final
Taravat Khaksar (IRI)	0
Wen Tzu-yun (TPE)	4

=== Repechage ===
Final of repechage
Latifa Haidare (AFG)	0
Cok Istri Agung Sanistyarani (INA)	9
Syakilla Salni (MAS)	2
Sabina Zakharova (KAZ)	0

Bronze medals
Cok Istri Agung Sanistyarani (INA)	1
Ding Jiamei (CHN)	0
Syakilla Salni (MAS)	2
Wong Sok I (MAC)	3
