= Philab Industries =

Philab Industries, Inc.
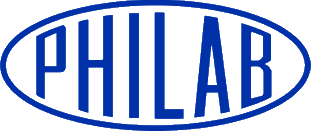
- Traded as: PSE: DNA (from 2016–2025; as Philab Holdings)
- Industry: Laboratory equipment; Biotechnology; healthcare
- Founded: 1959; 67 years ago
- Founder: Hector Navasero
- Headquarters: Philippines
- Area served: Asia
- Products: Laboratory kits and equipment; Diagnostic tools
- Services: Laboratory design; Genome sequencing
- Owner: Philab Holdings (since 2016)

Philab Industries is a Philippine company which provides life science equipment.

== History ==
Philab Industries was established in 1959 by agriculturist Hector Navasero. It became known for being a laboratory designer and builder.

In 1988, Philab partnered with the government to promote HIV testing using its provided test kits.

Taking advantage of partnerships made early as the 1990s, Philab has been providing laboratory equipment sourced from China to schools across the Philippines.

Philab established the Genomic Institute of Asia, a genome sequencing center.

The founder's son Hector Thomas Navasero took over the company after the elder Navasero's death in 2013.

Philab Industries got into the Philippine Stock Exchange (PSE) via backdoor listing. It was technically acquired by Alterra Capital Partners in August 2016. Alterra, the shell company renamed itself as Philab Holdings Corp. after the acquisition.

From June to October 2017, Darlene Berberabe briefly served as Philab chairperson after Hector Thomas Navasero resigned due to health reasons. He returned in October.

Philab Holdings was delisted from the PSE in 2025.

== Services ==
Philab Industries is primarily known for building laboratories and is a supplier of equipment for laboratories including those owned by schools. It has partnered with government agencies in the Philippines in the education and science fields.

Philab also provides diagnostic and genome sequencing services. Its LabIT (Laboratory Instant Testing) includes its at-home dengue test kit tool.

The Genomic Institute of Asia, its genome sequencing center had successfully sequenced the genetic makeup of rice.

== Involvement in baseball ==
Philab, which had had its founder Hector Navasero as president of the Philippine Amateur Baseball Association, is known to have organized its own baseball team. The multi-titled ballclub, is known to exist as early as the late-1980s and the 1990s.

The team which was later known in the early 2010s by the moniker Ballbusters won the 2013 Philippine Sports Commission (PSC) Chairman's Cup and 2014 PSC Commissioner's Cup.

Hector Navasero during his management of Philabs from the 1980s, have been also sponsoring the Philippines national baseball team program.
