= Wong Sok I =

Macau karateka (born 1993)

Personal information
- Born: 15 January 1993 (age 33)

Sport
- Country: Macau
- Sport: Karate
- Weight class: 55 kg
- Event: Kumite
Medal record
Women's karate
Representing Macau
Asian Games
Bronze medal – third place	2018 Jakarta	Kumite 55 kg
Asian Championships
Bronze medal – third place	2019 Tashkent	Kumite 55 kg

Wong Sok I (黃淑怡, born 15 January 1993) is a Macau karateka. She won one of the bronze medals in the women's kumite 55 kg event at the 2018 Asian Games held in Jakarta, Indonesia. In her bronze medal match she defeated Syakilla Salni of Malaysia.

At the 2014 Asian Games held in Incheon, South Korea, she competed in the women's kumite 55 kg event without winning a medal. She was eliminated in her first match by Mae Soriano of the Philippines. Soriano went on to win one of the bronze medals.

At the 2019 Asian Karate Championships held in Tashkent, Uzbekistan, she won one of the bronze medals in the women's kumite 55 kg event. In 2023, she competed in the women's kumite 55 kg event at the 2022 Asian Games held in Hangzhou, China where she was eliminated in her first match. She was also eliminated in her first match in the women's 55 kg event at the 2023 World Karate Championships held in Budapest, Hungary.

== Achievements ==
Year	Competition	Venue	Rank	Event
2018	Asian Games	Jakarta, Indonesia	3rd	Kumite 55 kg
2019	Asian Championships	Tashkent, Uzbekistan	3rd	Kumite 55 kg
