= Karate at the 2017 Islamic Solidarity Games =

- Venue: Baku Sports Hall
- Location: Azerbaijan, Baku
- Dates: 13–14 May

Karate at the 2017 Islamic Solidarity Games was held at Baku Sports Hall, Baku, Azerbaijan from 13 to 14 May 2017.

== Medal table ==
* Host nation (Azerbaijan)

Rank	Nation	Gold	Silver	Bronze	Total
1	Azerbaijan*	5	2	3	10
2	Turkey	2	6	3	11
3	Iran	2	1	5	8
4	Egypt	1	1	5	7
5	Uzbekistan	1	0	3	4
6	Jordan	1	0	1	2
7	Algeria	0	1	2	3
8	Pakistan	0	1	0	1
9	Indonesia	0	0	2	2
Totals (9 entries)		12	12	24	48

== Medal summary ==
=== Men ===
Event	Gold	Silver	Bronze
Individual kata	Roman Heydarov; Azerbaijan	Mehmet Yakan; Turkey	Abolfazl Shahrjerdi; Iran
Individual kata	Roman Heydarov; Azerbaijan	Mehmet Yakan; Turkey	Zeyad Abdelrahman; Egypt
Kumite −60 kg	Sadriddin Saymatov; Uzbekistan	Aykut Kaya; Turkey	Amir Mehdizadeh; Iran
Kumite −60 kg	Sadriddin Saymatov; Uzbekistan	Aykut Kaya; Turkey	Firdovsi Farzaliyev; Azerbaijan
Kumite −67 kg	Bashar Al-Najjar; Jordan	Abdelatif Benkhaled; Algeria	Ömer Kemaloğlu; Turkey
Kumite −67 kg	Bashar Al-Najjar; Jordan	Abdelatif Benkhaled; Algeria	Ali El-Sawy; Egypt
Kumite −75 kg	Rafael Aghayev; Azerbaijan	Saadi Abbas Jalbani; Pakistan	Dastonbek Otabolaev; Uzbekistan
Kumite −75 kg	Rafael Aghayev; Azerbaijan	Saadi Abbas Jalbani; Pakistan	Erman Eltemur; Turkey
Kumite −84 kg	Aykhan Mamayev; Azerbaijan	Alparslan Yamanoğlu; Turkey	Abdulaziz Ataboev; Uzbekistan
Kumite −84 kg	Aykhan Mamayev; Azerbaijan	Alparslan Yamanoğlu; Turkey	Mohamed El-Kotby; Egypt
Kumite +84 kg	Sajjad Ganjzadeh; Iran	Enes Erkan; Turkey	Asiman Gurbanli; Azerbaijan
Kumite +84 kg	Sajjad Ganjzadeh; Iran	Enes Erkan; Turkey	Ahmed El-Asfar; Egypt

=== Women ===
Event	Gold	Silver	Bronze
Individual kata	Dilara Bozan; Turkey	Aya Hesham; Egypt	Mahsa Afsaneh; Iran
Individual kata	Dilara Bozan; Turkey	Aya Hesham; Egypt	Sisilia Agustiani Ora; Indonesia
Kumite −50 kg	Nasrin Dousti; Iran	Serap Özçelik; Turkey	Imane Taleb; Algeria
Kumite −50 kg	Nasrin Dousti; Iran	Serap Özçelik; Turkey	Nurana Aliyeva; Azerbaijan
Kumite −55 kg	Yassmin Hamdy; Egypt	Ilaha Gasimova; Azerbaijan	Cok Istri Agung Sanistyarani; Indonesia
Kumite −55 kg	Yassmin Hamdy; Egypt	Ilaha Gasimova; Azerbaijan	Taravat Khaksar; Iran
Kumite −61 kg	Farida Abiyeva; Azerbaijan	Rozita Alipour; Iran	Merve Çoban; Turkey
Kumite −61 kg	Farida Abiyeva; Azerbaijan	Rozita Alipour; Iran	Barno Mirzaeva; Uzbekistan
Kumite −68 kg	Irina Zaretska; Azerbaijan	Eda Eltemur; Turkey	Nada Sayed; Egypt
Kumite −68 kg	Irina Zaretska; Azerbaijan	Eda Eltemur; Turkey	Hala Traish; Jordan
Kumite +68 kg	Meltem Hocaoğlu; Turkey	Farida Aliyeva; Azerbaijan	Imene Atif; Algeria
Kumite +68 kg	Meltem Hocaoğlu; Turkey	Farida Aliyeva; Azerbaijan	Mohaddeseh Aghaei; Iran
