= Karate at the 2017 SEA Games =

- Karate pictogram
- Venue: Kuala Lumpur Convention Centre
- Location: Kuala Lumpur, Malaysia
- Date: 22–24 August 2017

The karate competitions at the 2017 SEA Games in Kuala Lumpur were held at Kuala Lumpur Convention Centre.

The 2017 Games feature competitions in 16 events (4 kata and 12 kumite).

== Medalists ==
=== Kata ===
Event	Gold	Silver	Bronze
Men's individual	Lim Chee Wei; Malaysia	Ahmad Zigi Zaresta Yuda; Indonesia	Min Hein Khant; Myanmar
Men's individual	Lim Chee Wei; Malaysia	Ahmad Zigi Zaresta Yuda; Indonesia	James delos Santos; Philippines
Women's individual	Celine Lee Xin Yi; Malaysia	Sisilia Agustiani Ora; Indonesia	Nguyễn Thị Hằng; Vietnam
Women's individual	Celine Lee Xin Yi; Malaysia	Sisilia Agustiani Ora; Indonesia	Monsicha Tararattanakul; Thailand
Men's team	Malaysia; Emmanuel Leong Theng Kuang; Thomson Hoe; Lim Chee Wei	Indonesia; Andi Dasril Dwi Dharmawan; Andi Tomy Aditya Mardana; Aspar Sesasria	Vietnam; Giang Thanh Huy; Giang Việt Anh; Nguyễn Anh Dũng
Women's team	Vietnam; Lê Thị Khánh Ly; Nguyễn Thị Hằng; Nguyễn Thị Phương	Malaysia; Ariana Lim Jun Yi; Celine Lee Xin Yi; Cherlene Cheung Xue Lin	Brunei; Amirah Syahidah Abd Rahim; Aufa Bazilah Abdul Razak; Wahidah Kamarul Zaman
Women's team	Vietnam; Lê Thị Khánh Ly; Nguyễn Thị Hằng; Nguyễn Thị Phương	Malaysia; Ariana Lim Jun Yi; Celine Lee Xin Yi; Cherlene Cheung Xue Lin	Indonesia; Ayu Rahmawati; Eva Fitria Setiawati; Siti Maryam

=== Kumite ===
==== Men ====
Event	Gold	Silver	Bronze
−55 kg	Iwan Bidu Sirait; Indonesia	John Paul Bejar; Philippines	Prem Kumar Selvam; Malaysia
−55 kg	Iwan Bidu Sirait; Indonesia	John Paul Bejar; Philippines	Siravit Sawangsri; Thailand
−60 kg	Senthil Kumaran Silvarajoo; Malaysia	Jayson Ramil Macaalay; Philippines	Nguyễn Thanh Duy; Vietnam
−60 kg	Senthil Kumaran Silvarajoo; Malaysia	Jayson Ramil Macaalay; Philippines	Myint Maung Maung; Myanmar
−67 kg	Supa Ngamphuengphit; Thailand	Rexor Tacay; Philippines	Nguyễn Văn Nhật; Vietnam
−67 kg	Supa Ngamphuengphit; Thailand	Rexor Tacay; Philippines	Jintar Simanjuntak; Indonesia
−75 kg	Sharmendran Raghonathan; Malaysia	Chu Đức Thịnh; Vietnam	Sandi Firmansah; Indonesia
−75 kg	Sharmendran Raghonathan; Malaysia	Chu Đức Thịnh; Vietnam	Songvut Muntaen; Thailand
+75 kg	Nguyễn Minh Phụng; Vietnam	Theerapat Kangtong; Thailand	Somanroy Arulveeran; Malaysia
+75 kg	Nguyễn Minh Phụng; Vietnam	Theerapat Kangtong; Thailand	Hendro Salim; Indonesia
Team	Vietnam; Chu Đức Thịnh; Hồ Quang Vũ; Lê Minh Thuận; Nguyễn Minh Phụng; Nguyễn Thanh Duy; Nguyễn Văn Hải; Phạm Minh Nhựt	Thailand; Pichaiyuth Kanokvilaikul; Siravit Sawangsri; Songvut Muntaen; Supa Ngamphuengphit; Tanapon Romruen; Teerawat Pongsai; Theerapat Kangtong	Indonesia; Hendro Salim; Iwan Bidu Sirait; Jintar Simanjuntak; Jhoni Abdillah Sibarani; Rifki Ardiansyah Arrosyiid; Sandi Firmansah; Suryadi
Team	Vietnam; Chu Đức Thịnh; Hồ Quang Vũ; Lê Minh Thuận; Nguyễn Minh Phụng; Nguyễn Thanh Duy; Nguyễn Văn Hải; Phạm Minh Nhựt	Thailand; Pichaiyuth Kanokvilaikul; Siravit Sawangsri; Songvut Muntaen; Supa Ngamphuengphit; Tanapon Romruen; Teerawat Pongsai; Theerapat Kangtong	Malaysia; Arvindran Muruges; Prem Kumar Selvam; Ravin Vijaya Kumar; Senthil Kumaran Silvarajoo; Shaharudin Jamaludin; Sharmendran Raghonathan; Somanroy Arulveeran

==== Women ====
Event	Gold	Silver	Bronze
−50 kg	Srunita Sari Sukatendel; Indonesia	Paweena Raksachart; Thailand	Trần Thị Khánh Vy; Vietnam
−50 kg	Srunita Sari Sukatendel; Indonesia	Paweena Raksachart; Thailand	Junna Tsukii; Philippines
−55 kg	Syakilla Salni Jefry Krisnan; Malaysia	Trang Cẩm Lành; Vietnam	Tippawan Khamsi; Thailand
−55 kg	Syakilla Salni Jefry Krisnan; Malaysia	Trang Cẩm Lành; Vietnam	Mae Soriano; Philippines
−61 kg	Cok Istri Agung Sanistyarani; Indonesia	Arm Sukkiaw; Thailand	Nguyễn Thị Ngoan; Vietnam
−61 kg	Cok Istri Agung Sanistyarani; Indonesia	Arm Sukkiaw; Thailand	May Thu Cho; Myanmar
−68 kg	Hồ Thị Thu Hiền; Vietnam	Kanokwan Kwanwong; Thailand	Mathivani Murugeesan; Malaysia
−68 kg	Hồ Thị Thu Hiền; Vietnam	Kanokwan Kwanwong; Thailand	Yulanda Asmuruf; Indonesia
+68 kg	Nguyễn Thị Hồng Anh; Vietnam	Pressy Misty Philip; Malaysia	Dessyinta Rakawuni Banurea; Indonesia
+68 kg	Nguyễn Thị Hồng Anh; Vietnam	Pressy Misty Philip; Malaysia	Saowarot Samseemoung; Thailand
Team	Malaysia; Madhuri Poovanesan; Mathivani Murugeesan; Shree Sharmini Segaran; Syakilla Salni Jefry Krisnan	Vietnam; Bùi Thị Ngọc Hân; Lê Thị Thùy; Nguyễn Thị Hồng Anh; Nguyễn Thị Ngoan	Philippines; Erica Celine Samonte; Junna Tsukii; Kimverly Madrona; Mae Soriano
Team	Malaysia; Madhuri Poovanesan; Mathivani Murugeesan; Shree Sharmini Segaran; Syakilla Salni Jefry Krisnan	Vietnam; Bùi Thị Ngọc Hân; Lê Thị Thùy; Nguyễn Thị Hồng Anh; Nguyễn Thị Ngoan	Myanmar; April Phaw; May Thu Cho; Nilar Soe Oo; Win Thuzar Min

== Medal standings ==
* Host nation (Malaysia)

Rank	Nation	Gold	Silver	Bronze	Total
1	Malaysia*	7	2	4	13
2	Vietnam	5	3	6	14
3	Indonesia	3	3	7	13
4	Thailand	1	5	5	11
5	Philippines	0	3	4	7
6	Myanmar	0	0	4	4
7	Brunei	0	0	1	1
Totals (7 entries)		16	16	31	63
