= Teerawat Kangtong =

Thai karateka (born 1994)

Personal information
- Born: 10 May 1994 (age 32)

Sport
- Country: Thailand
- Sport: Karate
- Weight class: +84 kg
- Events: Kumite; Team kumite
Medal record
Men's karate
Representing Thailand
Asian Games
Bronze medal – third place	2022 Hangzhou	Kumite +84 kg
Bronze medal – third place	2026 Aichi-Nagoya	Kumite +84 kg
Asian Championships
Silver medal – second place	2025 Tashkent	Kumite +84 kg
Bronze medal – third place	2015 Yokohama	Kumite +84 kg
Bronze medal – third place	2018 Amman	Kumite +84 kg
Bronze medal – third place	2019 Tashkent	Kumite +84 kg
Southeast Asian Games
Gold medal – first place	2013 Naypyidaw	Kumite 84 kg
Gold medal – first place	2013 Naypyidaw	Team kumite
Gold medal – first place	2019 Philippines	Kumite +75 kg
Gold medal – first place	2023 Cambodia	Kumite +84 kg

Teerawat Kangtong (Thai: ธีรวัฒน์ คลังทอง; born 10 May 1994) is a Thai karateka. He won the gold medal in the men's kumite +75 kg event at the 2019 Southeast Asian Games held in Manila, Philippines. He also won the gold medal in the men's kumite 84 kg event at the 2013 Southeast Asian Games. He is a four-time medalist at the Asian Karate Championships.

== Career ==
In 2015, he won one of the bronze medals in the men's kumite +84 kg event at the Asian Karate Championships held in Yokohama, Japan.

At the 2018 Asian Karate Championships held in Amman, Jordan, he won one of the bronze medals in the men's kumite +84 kg event. A month later, he competed in the men's kumite +84 kg event at the Asian Games held in Jakarta, Indonesia. He was eliminated in his first match by Daniyar Yuldashev of Kazakhstan.

The following year, at the 2019 Asian Karate Championships held in Tashkent, Uzbekistan, he also won one of the bronze medals in this event.

In 2021, he competed at the World Olympic Qualification Tournament held in Paris, France hoping to qualify for the 2020 Summer Olympics in Tokyo, Japan. In 2023, he won one of the bronze medals in the men's kumite +84 kg event at the 2022 Asian Games held in Hangzhou, China. He defeated Muhammad Awais of Pakistan in his bronze medal match.

== Achievements ==
Year	Competition	Venue	Rank	Event
2013	Southeast Asian Games	Naypyidaw, Myanmar	1st	Kumite 84 kg
2013	Southeast Asian Games	Naypyidaw, Myanmar	1st	Team kumite
2015	Asian Championships	Yokohama, Japan	3rd	Kumite +84 kg
2018	Asian Championships	Amman, Jordan	3rd	Kumite +84 kg
2019	Asian Championships	Tashkent, Uzbekistan	3rd	Kumite +84 kg
2019	Southeast Asian Games	Manila, Philippines	1st	Kumite +75 kg
2023	Asian Games	Hangzhou, China	3rd	Kumite +84 kg
2025	Asian Championships	Tashkent, Uzbekistan	2nd	Kumite +84 kg
2026	Asian Games	Aichi and Nagoya, Japan	3rd	Kumite +84 kg
