= Karate at the 2017 World Games – Men's kata =

Men's Kata at the 2017 World Games
- Venue: GEM Sports Complex
- Date: 25 July 2017
- Competitors: 8 from 8 nations

Medalists
1st place, gold medalist(s)		(Japan) Ryo Kiyuna
2nd place, silver medalist(s)		(Spain) Damián Quintero
3rd place, bronze medalist(s)		(Venezuela) Antonio Díaz

The men's kata competition in karate at the 2017 World Games took place on 25 July 2017 at the GEM Sports Complex in Wrocław, Poland.

== Results ==
=== Elimination round ===
==== Group A ====
Rank	Athlete	B	W	D	L	Pts	Diff
1	Ryo Kiyuna (JPN)	3	3	0	0	15-0	+15
2	Damián Quintero (ESP)	3	2	0	1	10-5	+5
3	Mattia Busato (ITA)	3	1	0	2	5-10	-5
4	Ilja Smorguner (GER)	3	0	0	3	0-15	-15

	Score	
Mattia Busato (ITA)	0–5	Ryo Kiyuna (JPN)
Damián Quintero (ESP)	5–0	Ilja Smorguner (GER)
Mattia Busato (ITA)	0–5	Damián Quintero (ESP)
Ryo Kiyuna (JPN)	5–0	Ilja Smorguner (GER)
Mattia Busato (ITA)	5–0	Ilja Smorguner (GER)
Ryo Kiyuna (JPN)	5–0	Damián Quintero (ESP)

==== Group B ====
Rank	Athlete	B	W	D	L	Pts	Diff
1	Antonio Díaz (VEN)	3	3	0	0	14-1	+13
2	Vu Duc Minh Dack (FRA)	3	2	0	1	8-7	+1
3	Ahmed Shawky (EGY)	3	1	0	2	8-7	+1
4	Bartosz Mączka (POL)	3	0	0	3	0-15	-15

	Score	
Vu Duc Minh Dack (FRA)	5–0	Bartosz Mączka (POL)
Ahmed Shawky (EGY)	1–4	Antonio Díaz (VEN)
Vu Duc Minh Dack (FRA)	3–2	Ahmed Shawky (EGY)
Bartosz Mączka (POL)	0–5	Antonio Díaz (VEN)
Vu Duc Minh Dack (FRA)	0–5	Antonio Díaz (VEN)
Bartosz Mączka (POL)	0–5	Ahmed Shawky (EGY)

=== Finals ===
Semifinals
Ryo Kiyuna (JPN)	5
Vu Duc Minh Dack (FRA)	0
Antonio Díaz (VEN)	1
Damián Quintero (ESP)	4

Final
Ryo Kiyuna (JPN)	5
Damián Quintero (ESP)	0
Third place
Vu Duc Minh Dack (FRA)	1
Antonio Díaz (VEN)	4
