= Karate at the 2018 Asian Games – Men's kumite +84 kg =

Karate competition

Men's kumite +84 kg at the 2018 Asian Games
- Venue: Jakarta Convention Center
- Date: 25 August 2018
- Competitors: 13 from 13 nations

Medalists
gold medal	Sajjad Ganjzadeh	Iran
silver medal	Nguyễn Minh Phụng	Vietnam
bronze medal	Tareg Hamedi	Saudi Arabia
bronze medal	Daniyar Yuldashev	Kazakhstan

The men's kumite +84 kilograms competition at the 2018 Asian Games took place on 25 August 2018 at Jakarta Convention Center Plenary Hall, Jakarta, Indonesia.

== Schedule ==
All times are Western Indonesia Time (UTC+07:00)

Date	Time	Event
Saturday, 25 August 2018	14:00	1/8 finals
Saturday, 25 August 2018	14:00	Quarterfinals
Saturday, 25 August 2018	14:00	Semifinals
Saturday, 25 August 2018	14:00	Final of repechage
Saturday, 25 August 2018	17:00	Finals

== Results ==
Legend

- H — Won by hansoku (8–0)
- K — Won by kiken (8–0)

=== Main bracket ===
1/8 finals
Baz Muhammad (PAK)	0
Khalid Hassanein (QAT)	1
Adilet Shadykanov (KGZ)	6
Thodny Phongsamphan (LAO)	0
Sajjad Ganjzadeh (IRI)	K
Rezeqallah Tantish (PLE)
Daniyar Yuldashev (KAZ)	6
Teerawat Kangtong (THA)	2
Nguyễn Minh Phụng (VIE)	3
Munib Ur Rehman (AFG)	0

Quarterfinals
Khalid Hassanein (QAT)	0
Adilet Shadykanov (KGZ)	5
Sajjad Ganjzadeh (IRI)	4
Tareg Hamedi (KSA)	1
Daniyar Yuldashev (KAZ)	4
Lou Wai Kit (MAC)	3
Nguyễn Minh Phụng (VIE)	6^{H}
Mutasembellah Khair (JOR)	3

Semifinals
Adilet Shadykanov (KGZ)	1
Sajjad Ganjzadeh (IRI)	2
Daniyar Yuldashev (KAZ)	6
Nguyễn Minh Phụng (VIE)	6

Final
Sajjad Ganjzadeh (IRI)	5
Nguyễn Minh Phụng (VIE)	2

=== Repechage ===
Final of repechage
Rezeqallah Tantish (PLE)
Tareg Hamedi (KSA)	K
Munib Ur Rehman (AFG)	0
Mutasembellah Khair (JOR)	7

Bronze medals
Tareg Hamedi (KSA)	4
Adilet Shadykanov (KGZ)	0
Mutasembellah Khair (JOR)	2
Daniyar Yuldashev (KAZ)	7
