= Hector Navasero =

- Born: Hector Cruz Navasero; June 18, 1935
- Died: October 1, 2013 (aged 78); Makati, Metro Manila, Philippines
- Occupations: Businessman, sports executive
- Notable work: President of the Philippine Amateur Baseball Association (1986–2013), Founder of Philab Industries
- Spouse: Sylvia Rodriguez Arnaldo
- Children: 3

Hector Cruz Navasero was a Filipino businessman and sports executive who was the president for the Philippine Amateur Baseball Association from 1986 to 2013, and the founder of the laboratory equipment company Philab Industries.

== Early life ==
Hector Navasero was born on June 18, 1935, and was the second eldest of six siblings. He hails from Los Baños, Laguna. During the World War II, Navasero served as a courier for the Filipino guerillas in his hometown. He graduated from the University of the Philippines Los Baños in 1958 with an agriculture degree.

== Career ==
=== Baseball ===
Hector Navasero have supported the Philippine national baseball youth team program funded through his company Philab in the early 1980s. He was a long-time president of the Philippine Amateur Baseball Association (PABA) having been elected in 1986. He succeeded Dominador Pangilinan.

Navasero is credited for establishing the Asian Baseball Cup in 1994, which had its first edition in Manila in 1995. He also worked for the inclusion of baseball at the SEA Games, first proposing the inclusion of the baseball to get included in the 1997 edition in Jakarta as a demonstration sport. It was later included in the 2005 edition in Manila.

By 2011, the PABA was experiencing an internal crisis and funding issues which led to then Philippine Olympic Committee President Peping Cojuangco to task Marty Eizmendi to help Navasero organize a national team for the 2011 SEA Games. In late 2013, Navasero died in office.

=== Business ===
Navasero is the founder of the Philab Industries in 1959. The company is focused on designing laboratories and a supplier of tools for school laboratories in the Philippines.

He began passing the leadership of the company to his son, Hector Thomas in 2011. The younger Navasero officially became CEO and president of Philab in 2013.

== Personal life ==
Navasero was married to Sylvia Rodriguez Arnaldo, a professor in chemistry, with whom he had three children.

== Death ==
Navasero died on October 1, 2013, due to sepsis while confined at the Makati Medical Center in Makati.
