= Rifki Ardiansyah Arrosyiid =

Indonesian karateka (born 1997)

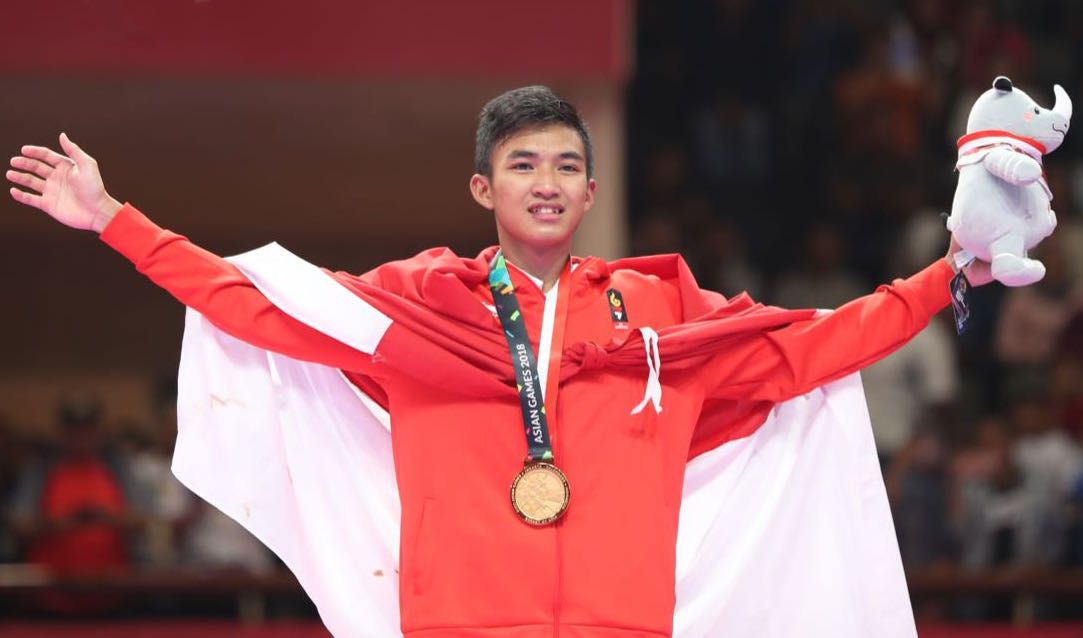
- Rifki at the 2018 Asian Games

Personal information
- Born: 24 December 1997 (age 28) Surabaya, East Java, Indonesia
- Height: 167 cm (5 ft 6 in)

Sport
- Sport: Karate, kumite
Medal record
Men's karate
Representing Indonesia
Asian Games
Gold medal – first place	2018 Jakarta–Palembang	60 kg
SEA Games
Silver medal – second place	2019 Philippines	60 kg
Bronze medal – third place	2017 Kuala Lumpur	Team

Rifki Ardiansyah Arrosyiid (born 24 December 1997) is an Indonesian karateka. After winning a bronze medal in the 2017 SEA Games, he defeated two-time world champion Amir Mehdizadeh to win gold at the 2018 Asian Games.

Born in Surabaya, he was introduced to the sports at a young age and later joined the military instead of continuing his studies at Gadjah Mada University to participate further in the sport.

== Biography ==
Rifki was born in Surabaya, East Java. He was introduced to the sport in the first year of elementary school, and eventually began participating in local competitions. By the time he went to middle school, he began winning local and national competitions. After graduating from high school, he was accepted to study civil engineering at Gadjah Mada University, but instead decided to join the military at Kodam V/Brawijaya so he could more actively practice. As of August 2018, he held the rank of sergeant.

Winning or placing high in multiple national and international competitions against senior karateka, he passed through the national selection for the 2017 SEA Games, although he was not placed in the individual competition. His team won bronze. The following year, he managed to secure a spot in the 2018 Asian Games national contingent for the individual competition, for the 60 kg weight class. Making his way to the finals, he faced Amir Mehdizadeh (2012 and 2016 World Championship winner), defeating him 9–7. After winning the gold medal, he received a bonus from both the Indonesian government and the national karate forum, totalling Rp 2.5 billion ($170,000).

== Awards and nominations ==
Award	Year	Category	Result	Ref.
Indonesian Sport Awards	2018	Favorite Male Athlete	Nominated	
