= Karate at the 2001 World Games – Men's kata =

Karate men's kata at the 2001 World Games
- Venue: Tenno Town Gymnasium, Tenno, Akita, Japan
- Dates: 19 August 2001
- Competitors: 8 from 7 nations

Medalists
gold medal	(Japan) Ryoki Abe
silver medal	(Italy) Luca Valdesi
bronze medal	(Venezuela) Antonio Díaz

The men's kata competition in karate at the 2001 World Games took place on 2001 August 19 at the Tenno Town Gymnasium in Tenno, Akita, Japan.

== Competition format ==
A total of 8 athletes entered the competition. They fought in cup system with repechages.

== Results ==
=== Gold medal bracket ===
Quarterfinals
(Australia) Christopher Nunis (AUS)	0
(Venezuela) Antonio Díaz (VEN)	3
(Madagascar) Fanomezana Rakotonoely (MAD)	0
(Italy) Luca Valdesi (ITA)	3
(Japan) Ryoki Abe (JPN)	2
(Italy) Lucio Maurino (ITA)	1
(Peru) Akio Tamashiro (PER)	2
(Germany) Siegfried Hartl (GER)	1

Semifinals
(Venezuela) Antonio Díaz (VEN)	1
(Italy) Luca Valdesi (ITA)	2
(Japan) Ryoki Abe (JPN)	2
(Peru) Akio Tamashiro (PER)	1

Final
' (Italy) Luca Valdesi (ITA)	1
(Japan) Ryoki Abe (JPN)	2

=== Bronze medal bracket ===
Repechage
(Venezuela) Antonio Díaz (VEN)	WO
(Madagascar) Fanomezana Rakotonoely (MAD)
(Peru) Akio Tamashiro (PER)	2
(Italy) Lucio Maurino (ITA)	1

Third place
(Venezuela) Antonio Díaz (VEN)	2
(Peru) Akio Tamashiro (PER)	1
