= Jamie Lim =

Filipino karateka (born 1997)

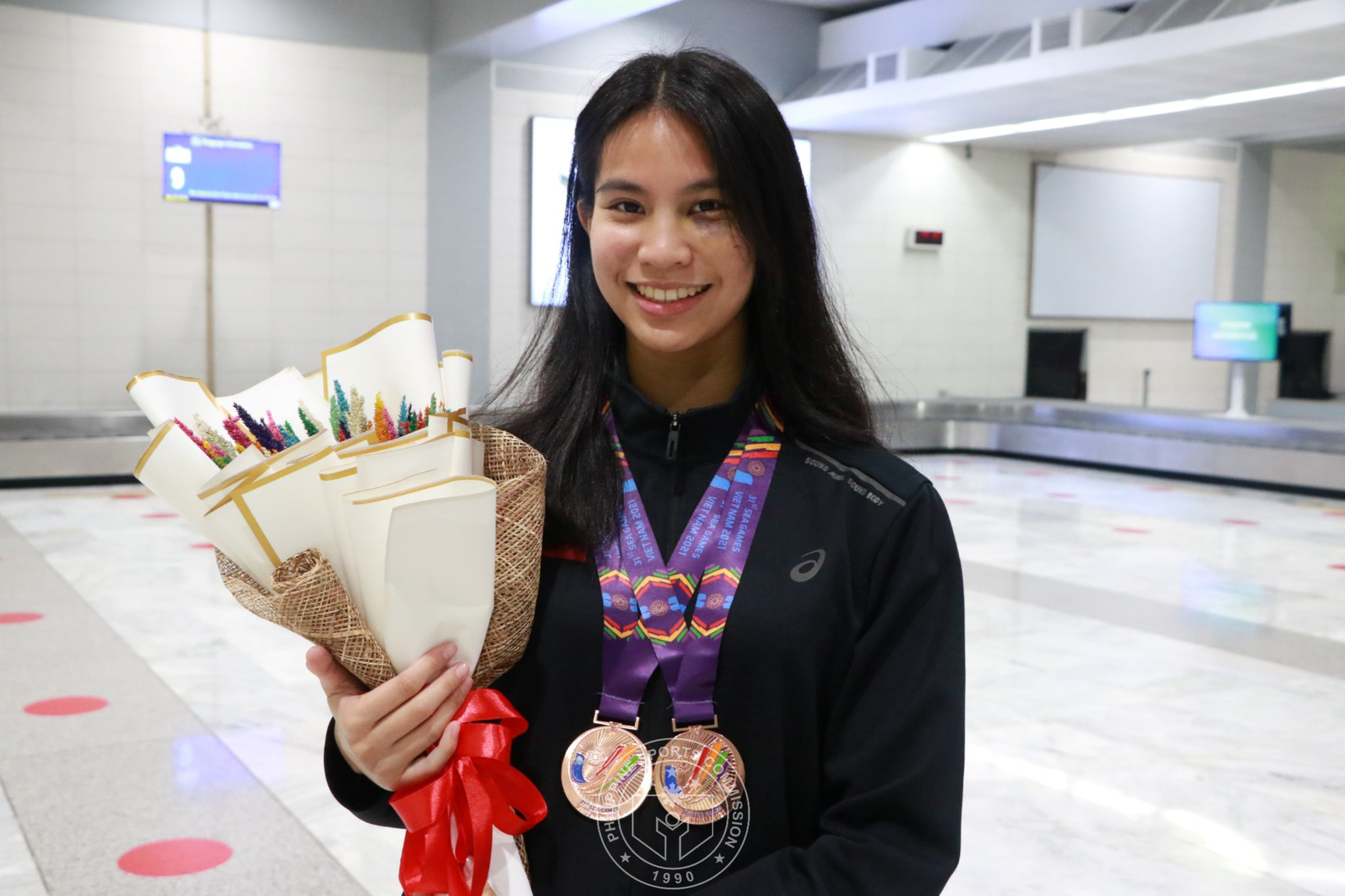
- Lim in 2022

Personal information
- Full name: Jamie Christine Berberabe Lim
- Born: May 13, 1997 (age 29)
- Height: 1.73 m (5 ft 8 in)

Sport
- Country: Philippines
- Sport: Karate
- Weight class: 61 kg
- Events: Kumite; Team kumite
Medal record
Women's karate
Representing Philippines
Asian Championships
Silver medal – second place	2021 Almaty	Kumite 61 kg
Southeast Asian Games
Gold medal – first place	2019 Philippines	Kumite +61 kg
Gold medal – first place	2023 Cambodia	Kumite 61 kg
Silver medal – second place	2023 Cambodia	Team kumite
Bronze medal – third place	2021 Hanoi	Kumite 61 kg
Bronze medal – third place	2021 Hanoi	Team kumite

Jamie Christine Berberabe Lim (born May 13, 1997) is a Filipino karateka and courtside reporter. She won the gold medal in the women's kumite +61 kg event at the 2019 Southeast Asian Games held in the Philippines.

In June 2021, Lim competed at the World Olympic Qualification Tournament held in Paris, France hoping to qualify for the 2020 Summer Olympics in Tokyo, Japan. In November 2021, she competed in the women's 61 kg event at the World Karate Championships held in Dubai, United Arab Emirates. In December 2021, she won the silver medal in the women's kumite 61 kg event at the Asian Karate Championships held in Almaty, Kazakhstan.

Lim won two bronze medals at the 2021 Southeast Asian Games held in Hanoi, Vietnam. In 2023, she competed in the women's 61 kg event at the 2022 Asian Games held in Hangzhou, China. She also competed in the women's 61 kg event at the World Karate Championships held in Budapest, Hungary.

In 2025, she appeared as a courtside reporter for the PVL and PBA on TV5.

== Biography ==
Lim's father is former PBA Hall of Famer Samboy Lim, while her mother is Solicitor General Darlene Berberabe. She graduated summa cum laude in the University of the Philippines Diliman with a degree in BS Mathematics.

== Achievements ==
Year	Competition	Venue	Rank	Event
2019	Southeast Asian Games	Manila, Philippines	1st	Kumite +61 kg
2021	Asian Championships	Almaty, Kazakhstan	2nd	Kumite 61 kg
2022	Southeast Asian Games	Hanoi, Vietnam	3rd	Kumite 61 kg
2022	Southeast Asian Games	Hanoi, Vietnam	3rd	Team kumite
2023	Southeast Asian Games	Phnom Penh, Cambodia	1st	Kumite 61 kg
2023	Southeast Asian Games	Phnom Penh, Cambodia	2nd	Team kumite
