= Wael Shueb =

Syrian-German karateka

- Born: October 31, 1987 (age 38); Syria

Wael Shueb (born 31 October 1987 in Syria) is a Syrian karateka. He lives in Germany where he arrived as a refugee after leaving war-torn Syria in 2015.

He is one of two male karatekas to be included in the International Olympic Committee (IOC)'s Refugee Olympic Team (EOR) for the 2020 Olympic Games at Tokyo, where he competed in the men's kata competition. He finished in 6th place in his pool in the elimination round of the men's kata event and did not advance to the next round.
