= Karate at the 2022 Asian Games – Men's kumite +84 kg =

Men's kumite +84 kg at the 2022 Asian Games
- Venue: Linping Sports Centre Gymnasium
- Date: 6 October 2023
- Competitors: 12 from 12 nations

Medalists
gold medal	Sajjad Ganjzadeh	Iran
silver medal	Adilet Shadykanov	Kyrgyzstan
bronze medal	Tareg Hamedi	Saudi Arabia
bronze medal	Teerawat Kangtong	Thailand

The men's kumite +84 kilograms competition at 2022 Asian Games took place on 6 October 2023 at Linping Sports Centre Gymnasium, Hangzhou.

== Schedule ==
All times are China Standard Time (UTC+08:00)

Date	Time	Event
Friday, 6 October 2023	08:30	Round of 16
Friday, 6 October 2023	08:30	Quarterfinals
Friday, 6 October 2023	08:30	Semifinals
Friday, 6 October 2023	08:30	Repechages
Friday, 6 October 2023	14:30	Finals

== Results ==
Legend

- K — Won by kiken (8–0)

=== Main bracket ===
Round of 16
Lou Wai Kit (MAC)	0
Trần Lê Tấn Đạt (VIE)	0
Biplav Lal Shrestha (NEP)	12
Umed Safarov (TJK)	4
Sajjad Ganjzadeh (IRI)	8
Vatthana Xayasan (LAO)	3
Teerawat Kangtong (THA)	6
Samarbek Khamroev (UZB)	2

Quarterfinals
Tareg Hamedi (KSA)	1
Lou Wai Kit (MAC)	0
Biplav Lal Shrestha (NEP)	1
Adilet Shadykanov (KGZ)	5
Muhammad Awais (PAK)	1
Sajjad Ganjzadeh (IRI)	9
Teerawat Kangtong (THA)	9
Şatlyk Allakow (TKM)	0

Semifinals
Tareg Hamedi (KSA)	4
Adilet Shadykanov (KGZ)	5
Sajjad Ganjzadeh (IRI)	3
Teerawat Kangtong (THA)	2

Gold medal contest
Adilet Shadykanov (KGZ)	2
Sajjad Ganjzadeh (IRI)	4

=== Repechage ===
Repechage round 1
Vatthana Xayasan (LAO)
Muhammad Awais (PAK)	K

Bronze medal bouts
Biplav Lal Shrestha (NEP)	1
Tareg Hamedi (KSA)	9
Muhammad Awais (PAK)	3
Teerawat Kangtong (THA)	5
