= Karate at the 2018 Asian Games – Men's kumite 60 kg =

Karate competition

Men's kumite 60 kg at the 2018 Asian Games
- Venue: Jakarta Convention Center
- Date: 26 August 2018
- Competitors: 23 from 23 nations

Medalists
gold medal	Rifki Ardiansyah Arrosyiid	Indonesia
silver medal	Amir Mehdizadeh	Iran
bronze medal	Prem Kumar Selvam	Malaysia
bronze medal	Sadriddin Saymatov	Uzbekistan

The men's kumite 60 kilograms competition at the 2018 Asian Games took place on 26 August 2018 at Jakarta Convention Center Plenary Hall, Jakarta, Indonesia.

== Schedule ==
All times are Western Indonesia Time (UTC+07:00)

Date	Time	Event
Sunday, 26 August 2018	09:00	1/16 finals
Sunday, 26 August 2018	09:00	1/8 finals
Sunday, 26 August 2018	09:00	Quarterfinals
Sunday, 26 August 2018	09:00	Semifinals
Sunday, 26 August 2018	09:00	Repechage round 1
Sunday, 26 August 2018	09:00	Final of repechage
Sunday, 26 August 2018	12:00	Finals

== Results ==
Legend

- H — Won by hansoku (8–0)

=== Main bracket ===
==== Final ====
Final
Rifki Ardiansyah Arrosyiid (INA)	9
Amir Mehdizadeh (IRI)	7

==== Top half ====
1/16 finals
Siravit Sawangsri (THA)	1
Rifki Ardiansyah Arrosyiid (INA)	5
Song Yun-hak (PRK)	3
Rafael Akbarov (KGZ)	4
Teodoro Coli (TLS)	0
Hazrat Gul Osmani (AFG)	9
Ali Al-Madhfari (YEM)	0
Phonepaseuth Lasasimma (LAO)	1

1/8 finals
Rifki Ardiansyah Arrosyiid (INA)	5^{H}
Chen Hu (CHN)	0
Rafael Akbarov (KGZ)	0
Lee Chun Ho (HKG)	2
Hazrat Gul Osmani (AFG)	2
Prasanga Sandaruwan (SRI)	4
Phonepaseuth Lasasimma (LAO)	0
Prem Kumar Selvam (MAS)	7

Quarterfinals
Rifki Ardiansyah Arrosyiid (INA)	3
Lee Chun Ho (HKG)	0
Prasanga Sandaruwan (SRI)	1
Prem Kumar Selvam (MAS)	3

Semifinals
Rifki Ardiansyah Arrosyiid (INA)	4
Prem Kumar Selvam (MAS)	4

==== Bottom half ====
1/16 finals
Abdullah Shaaban (KUW)	0
Darkhan Assadilov (KAZ)	6
Sultan Al-Zahrani (KSA)	2
Gu Ju-yeong (KOR)	0
Jayson Macaalay (PHI)	3
Ng Tou Lam (MAC)	0

1/8 finals
Darkhan Assadilov (KAZ)	0
Sadriddin Saymatov (UZB)	6^{H}
Sultan Al-Zahrani (KSA)	8
Islam Abuammash (PLE)	0
Jayson Macaalay (PHI)	0
Amir Mehdizadeh (IRI)	6
Sonam Lama (NEP)	0
Nguyễn Văn Hải (VIE)	3

Quarterfinals
Sadriddin Saymatov (UZB)	3
Sultan Al-Zahrani (KSA)	1
Amir Mehdizadeh (IRI)	0
Nguyễn Văn Hải (VIE)	0

Semifinals
Sadriddin Saymatov (UZB)	6
Amir Mehdizadeh (IRI)	7

=== Repechage ===
Repechage round 1
Siravit Sawangsri (THA)	3
Chen Hu (CHN)	0

Final of repechage
Siravit Sawangsri (THA)	1
Lee Chun Ho (HKG)	3
Jayson Macaalay (PHI)	0
Nguyễn Văn Hải (VIE)	4

Bronze medals
Lee Chun Ho (HKG)	0
Prem Kumar Selvam (MAS)	5
Nguyễn Văn Hải (VIE)	1
Sadriddin Saymatov (UZB)	8
