= 2018 Asian Karate Championships =

Karate competition

- Host city: Amman, Jordan
- Dates: 13–15 July 2018
- Main venue: Al-Hussein Sports City

The 2018 Asian Karate Championships were the 15th edition of the Asian Karate Championships, and were held in Amman, Jordan from July 13 to July 15, 2018.

== Medalists ==
=== Men ===
Event	Gold	Silver	Bronze
Individual kata	Ryo Kiyuna; Japan	Wang Yi-ta; Chinese Taipei	Salman Al-Mosawi; Kuwait
Individual kata	Ryo Kiyuna; Japan	Wang Yi-ta; Chinese Taipei	Chris Cheng; Hong Kong
Team kata	Japan; Arata Kinjo; Ryo Kiyuna; Takuya Uemura	Malaysia; Thomson Hoe; Emmanuel Leong; Ivan Oh	Kuwait; Mohammad Al-Mosawi; Salman Al-Mosawi; Mohammad Bader
Team kata	Japan; Arata Kinjo; Ryo Kiyuna; Takuya Uemura	Malaysia; Thomson Hoe; Emmanuel Leong; Ivan Oh	United Arab Emirates; Khalifa Al-Abbar; Amin Al-Awadhi; Marwan Al-Maazmi
Kumite −55 kg	Majid Hassannia; Iran	Saud Al-Basher; Saudi Arabia	Daulet Shymyrbekov; Kazakhstan
Kumite −55 kg	Majid Hassannia; Iran	Saud Al-Basher; Saudi Arabia	Prem Kumar Selvam; Malaysia
Kumite −60 kg	Abdullah Shaaban; Kuwait	Nguyễn Văn Hải; Vietnam	Siravit Sawangsri; Thailand
Kumite −60 kg	Abdullah Shaaban; Kuwait	Nguyễn Văn Hải; Vietnam	Sadriddin Saymatov; Uzbekistan
Kumite −67 kg	Abdelrahman Al-Masatfa; Jordan	Fahad Al-Khathami; Saudi Arabia	Ikboljon Uzakov; Uzbekistan
Kumite −67 kg	Abdelrahman Al-Masatfa; Jordan	Fahad Al-Khathami; Saudi Arabia	Assylbek Muratov; Kazakhstan
Kumite −75 kg	Bashar Al-Najjar; Jordan	Ali Asghar Asiabari; Iran	Raef Al-Turkistani; Saudi Arabia
Kumite −75 kg	Bashar Al-Najjar; Jordan	Ali Asghar Asiabari; Iran	Sandy Firmansyah; Indonesia
Kumite −84 kg	Ryutaro Araga; Japan	Mahmoud Sajan; Jordan	Mehdi Khodabakhshi; Iran
Kumite −84 kg	Ryutaro Araga; Japan	Mahmoud Sajan; Jordan	Faraj Al-Nashri; Saudi Arabia
Kumite +84 kg	Saleh Abazari; Iran	Hideyoshi Kagawa; Japan	Teerawat Kangtong; Thailand
Kumite +84 kg	Saleh Abazari; Iran	Hideyoshi Kagawa; Japan	Tareg Hamedi; Saudi Arabia
Team kumite	Iran; Saleh Abazari; Bahman Asgari; Keivan Baban; Sajjad Ganjzadeh; Saman Heidari; Mehdi Khodabakhshi; Zabihollah Pourshab	Saudi Arabia; Majed Al-Khalifah; Fahad Al-Khathami; Faraj Al-Nashri; Bader Al-Otaibi; Raef Al-Turkistani; Sultan Al-Zahrani; Tareg Hamedi	Japan; Ryutaro Araga; Masaya Ishizuka; Hideyoshi Kagawa; Yuta Mori; Ken Nishimura; Hiroto Shinohara; Daisuke Watanabe
Team kumite	Iran; Saleh Abazari; Bahman Asgari; Keivan Baban; Sajjad Ganjzadeh; Saman Heidari; Mehdi Khodabakhshi; Zabihollah Pourshab	Saudi Arabia; Majed Al-Khalifah; Fahad Al-Khathami; Faraj Al-Nashri; Bader Al-Otaibi; Raef Al-Turkistani; Sultan Al-Zahrani; Tareg Hamedi	Kazakhstan; Igor Chikhmarev; German Kossenko; Assylbek Muratov; Rinat Sagandykov; Nurtiles Tynysbek; Dimash Ukmatov; Ruslan Yesmakhanbet

=== Women ===
Event	Gold	Silver	Bronze
Individual kata	Kiyou Shimizu; Japan	Celine Lee; Malaysia	Nawar Kautsar Mastura; Indonesia
Individual kata	Kiyou Shimizu; Japan	Celine Lee; Malaysia	Grace Lau; Hong Kong
Team kata	Japan; Saori Ishibashi; Mai Mugiyama; Sae Taira	Malaysia; Chang Sin Yi; Khaw Yee Voon; Celine Lee	Iran; Najmeh Ghazizadeh; Shadi Jafarizadeh; Elnaz Taghipour
Team kata	Japan; Saori Ishibashi; Mai Mugiyama; Sae Taira	Malaysia; Chang Sin Yi; Khaw Yee Voon; Celine Lee	Vietnam; Lê Thị Nghi; Nguyễn Thị Hằng; Nguyễn Thị Phương
Kumite −50 kg	Miho Miyahara; Japan	Li Ranran; China	Tsang Yee Ting; Hong Kong
Kumite −50 kg	Miho Miyahara; Japan	Li Ranran; China	Gu Shiau-shuang; Chinese Taipei
Kumite −55 kg	Wen Tzu-yun; Chinese Taipei	Cok Istri Agung Sanistyarani; Indonesia	Tippawan Khamsi; Thailand
Kumite −55 kg	Wen Tzu-yun; Chinese Taipei	Cok Istri Agung Sanistyarani; Indonesia	Aruzhan Mukhtar; Kazakhstan
Kumite −61 kg	Yin Xiaoyan; China	Nguyễn Thị Ngoan; Vietnam	Shima Alesaadi; Iran
Kumite −61 kg	Yin Xiaoyan; China	Nguyễn Thị Ngoan; Vietnam	Intan Nurjanah; Indonesia
Kumite −68 kg	Kayo Someya; Japan	Hồ Thị Thu Hiền; Vietnam	Ceyco Georgia Zefanya; Indonesia
Kumite −68 kg	Kayo Someya; Japan	Hồ Thị Thu Hiền; Vietnam	Tang Lingling; China
Kumite +68 kg	Hamideh Abbasali; Iran	Wen Tzu-hsuan; Chinese Taipei	Ayumi Uekusa; Japan
Kumite +68 kg	Hamideh Abbasali; Iran	Wen Tzu-hsuan; Chinese Taipei	Paula Carion; Macau
Team kumite	Japan; Natsumi Kawamura; Ayaka Saito; Mayumi Someya; Ayumi Uekusa	Kazakhstan; Alexandra Budkina; Aruzhan Mukhtar; Assel Serikova; Gulmira Ussenova	Vietnam; Bùi Thị Ngọc Hân; Hồ Thị Thu Hiền; Nguyễn Thị Hồng Anh; Nguyễn Thị Ngoan
Team kumite	Japan; Natsumi Kawamura; Ayaka Saito; Mayumi Someya; Ayumi Uekusa	Kazakhstan; Alexandra Budkina; Aruzhan Mukhtar; Assel Serikova; Gulmira Ussenova	China; Ding Jiamei; Gao Mengmeng; Tang Lingling; Yin Xiaoyan

== Medal table ==
Rank	Nation	Gold	Silver	Bronze	Total
1	Japan	8	1	2	11
2	Iran	4	1	3	8
3	Jordan	2	1	0	3
4	Chinese Taipei	1	2	1	4
5	China	1	1	2	4
6	Kuwait	1	0	2	3
7	Saudi Arabia	0	3	3	6
8	Vietnam	0	3	2	5
9	Malaysia	0	3	1	4
10	Indonesia	0	1	4	5
10	Kazakhstan	0	1	4	5
12	Hong Kong	0	0	3	3
12	Thailand	0	0	3	3
14	Uzbekistan	0	0	2	2
15	Macau	0	0	1	1
15	United Arab Emirates	0	0	1	1
Totals (16 entries)		17	17	34	68
