= Taravat Khaksar =

Iranian karateka (born 1993)

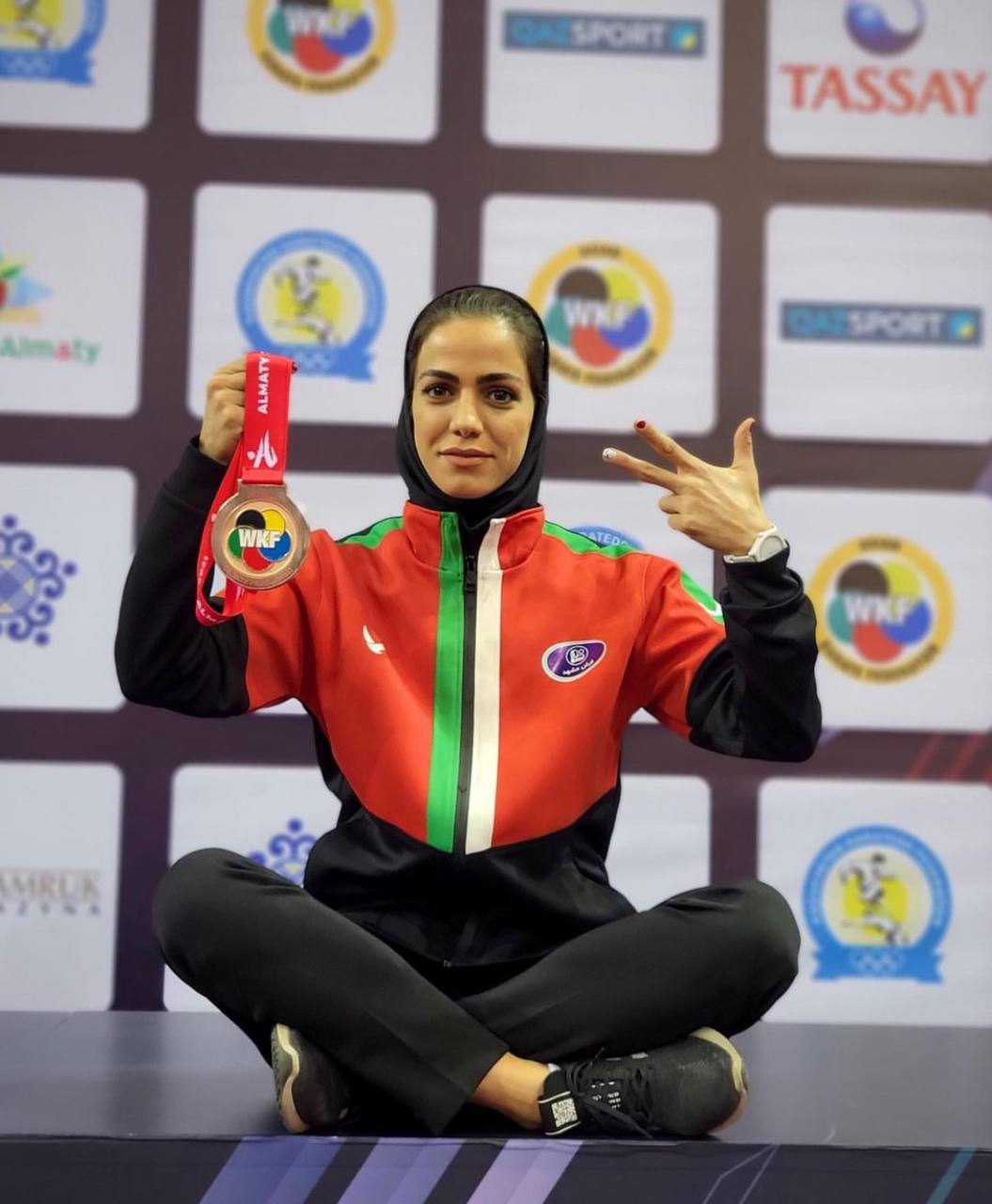
- Khaksar in 2017

Personal information
- Born: 12 October 1993 (age 32) Tehran, Iran

Sport
- Country: Iran
- Sport: Karate
- Weight class: 55 kg
- Event: Kumite
Medal record
Women's karate
Representing Iran
Asian Games
Silver medal – second place	2018 Jakarta	Kumite 55 kg
Islamic Solidarity Games
Bronze medal – third place	2017 Baku	Kumite 55 kg
Asian Championships
Gold medal – first place	2019 Tashkent	Kumite 55 kg
Gold medal – first place	2019 Tashkent	Team kumite
Bronze medal – third place	2021 Almaty	Kumite 55 kg
Bronze medal – third place	2024 Hangzhou	Kumite 55 kg

Taravat Khaksar (Persian: طراوت خاکسار, born 12 October 1993) is an Iranian karateka. She won the silver medal in the women's kumite 55 kg event at the 2018 Asian Games held in Jakarta, Indonesia. In the final, she lost against Wen Tzu-yun of Chinese Taipei. She won the gold medal in her event at the 2019 Asian Karate Championships held in Tashkent, Uzbekistan.

== Career ==
At the 2017 Islamic Solidarity Games held in Baku, Azerbaijan, she won one of the bronze medals in the women's kumite 55 kg event.

At the 2019 Asian Karate Championships held in Tashkent, Uzbekistan, she won the gold medal in the women's kumite 55 kg event. She also won the gold medal in the team kumite event.

She won one of the bronze medals in her event at the 2021 Asian Karate Championships held in Almaty, Kazakhstan.

== Achievements ==
Year	Competition	Venue	Rank	Event
2010	Asian Championships	hong kong, china	3rd	Kumite 55 kg
2017	Islamic Solidarity Games	Baku, Azerbaijan	3rd	Kumite 55 kg
2017	karate1 premier league	Paris, France	1st	Kumite 55 kg
2018	Asian Games	Jakarta, Indonesia	2nd	Kumite 55 kg
2019	karate1 premier league	Istanbul, Turkey	1st	Kumite 55 kg
2019	Asian Championships	Tashkent, Uzbekistan	1st	Kumite 55 kg
2019	Asian Championships	Tashkent, Uzbekistan	1st	Team kumite
2021	Asian Championships	Almaty, Kazakhstan	3rd	Kumite 55 kg
