= Karate at the 2019 SEA Games =

Competitions at the Southeast Asian Games

- Venue: World Trade Center Metro Manila
- Location: Manila, Philippines
- Date: 7–9 December

The karate competitions at the 2019 SEA Games in Philippines were held at World Trade Center Metro Manila from 7 to 9 December 2019.

== Schedule ==
The following is the schedule for the karate competitions. All times are Philippine Standard Time (UTC+8).

== Medal table ==
* Host nation (Philippines)

Rank	Nation	Gold	Silver	Bronze	Total
1	Malaysia	4	4	0	8
2	Thailand	3	2	3	8
3	Vietnam	2	3	6	11
4	Indonesia	2	3	4	9
5	Philippines*	2	1	9	12
6	Laos	0	0	2	2
7	Brunei	0	0	1	1
7	Myanmar	0	0	1	1
Totals (8 entries)		13	13	26	52

== Medalists ==
=== Kata ===
Event	Gold	Silver	Bronze
Men's individual	Ahmad Zigi Zaresta Yuda; Indonesia	Ooi San Hong; Malaysia	Amkha Vongphachan; Laos
Men's individual	Ahmad Zigi Zaresta Yuda; Indonesia	Ooi San Hong; Malaysia	John Enrico Vasquez; Philippines
Women's individual	Krisda Putri Aprilia; Indonesia	Nguyễn Thị Phương; Vietnam	Sarah Pangilinan; Philippines
Women's individual	Krisda Putri Aprilia; Indonesia	Nguyễn Thị Phương; Vietnam	Monsicha Tararattanakul; Thailand
Men's team	Malaysia; Thomson Hoe; Ivan Oh; Emmanuel Leong	Indonesia; Andi Dharmawan; Andi Mardana; Albiadi	Philippines; John Enrico Vasquez; Mark Andrew Manantan; Adam Bondoc
Men's team	Malaysia; Thomson Hoe; Ivan Oh; Emmanuel Leong	Indonesia; Andi Dharmawan; Andi Mardana; Albiadi	Vietnam; Sài Công Nguyên; Giang Việt Anh; Phạm Trường An
Women's team	Vietnam; Lưu Thị Thu Uyên; Nguyễn Thị Phương; Lê Thị Khánh Ly	Malaysia; Celine Lee Xin Yi; Khaw Yee Voon; Chang Sin Yi	Indonesia; Dian Monika Nababan; Emilia Sri Hanandyta; Anugerah Nurul Lucky
Women's team	Vietnam; Lưu Thị Thu Uyên; Nguyễn Thị Phương; Lê Thị Khánh Ly	Malaysia; Celine Lee Xin Yi; Khaw Yee Voon; Chang Sin Yi	Philippines; Nicole Erika Dantes; Ronaldene Aletheia Flores; Rebecca Cyril Torres

=== Kumite ===
==== Men ====
Event	Gold	Silver	Bronze
−55 kg	Prem Kumar Selvam; Malaysia	Norman Montalvo; Philippines	Worakan Soda; Thailand
−55 kg	Prem Kumar Selvam; Malaysia	Norman Montalvo; Philippines	Nguyễn Văn Hải; Vietnam
−60 kg	Nguyễn Thanh Duy; Vietnam	Rifki Ardiansyah Arrosyiid; Indonesia	Salanh Manisinh; Laos
−60 kg	Nguyễn Thanh Duy; Vietnam	Rifki Ardiansyah Arrosyiid; Indonesia	Jason Ramil Macaalay; Philippines
−67 kg	Supa Ngamphuengphit; Thailand	Muhammad Arif Ab Malik; Malaysia	Mohd Sofian Muhd Sufizan; Brunei
−67 kg	Supa Ngamphuengphit; Thailand	Muhammad Arif Ab Malik; Malaysia	Đặng Hồng Sơn; Vietnam
−75 kg	Sharmendran Raghonathan; Malaysia	Songvut Muntaen; Thailand	Sandi Firmansyah; Indonesia
−75 kg	Sharmendran Raghonathan; Malaysia	Songvut Muntaen; Thailand	Ivan Christopher Agustin; Philippines
+75 kg	Teerawat Kangtong; Thailand	Đỗ Thành Nhân; Vietnam	Daniel; Indonesia
+75 kg	Teerawat Kangtong; Thailand	Đỗ Thành Nhân; Vietnam	Sharief Afif; Philippines

==== Women ====
Event	Gold	Silver	Bronze
−50 kg	Junna Tsukii; Philippines	Đinh Thị Hương; Vietnam	Maya Sheva; Indonesia
−50 kg	Junna Tsukii; Philippines	Đinh Thị Hương; Vietnam	Paweena Raksachart; Thailand
−55 kg	Madhuri Poovanesan; Malaysia	Tippawan Khamsi; Thailand	Mae Soriano; Philippines
−55 kg	Madhuri Poovanesan; Malaysia	Tippawan Khamsi; Thailand	Trang Cẩm Lành; Vietnam
−61 kg	Arm Sukkiaw; Thailand	Mathivani Murugeesan; Malaysia	Joane Bernice Orbon; Philippines
−61 kg	Arm Sukkiaw; Thailand	Mathivani Murugeesan; Malaysia	Hồ Thị Thu Hiền; Vietnam
+61 kg	Jamie Christine Lim; Philippines	Ceyco Georgia Zefanya; Indonesia	Nway Nway Zaw Win; Myanmar
+61 kg	Jamie Christine Lim; Philippines	Ceyco Georgia Zefanya; Indonesia	Bùi Thị Thảo; Vietnam
