= Ahmad Zigi Zaresta Yuda =

Indonesian karateka (born 1998)

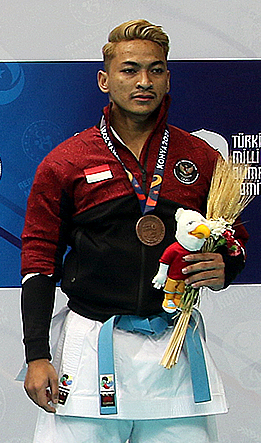

Personal information
- Born: 14 January 1998 (age 28) West Lombok, West Nusa Tenggara, Indonesia

Sport
- Country: Indonesia
- Sport: Karate
- Event: Individual kata
Medal record
Men's karate
Representing Indonesia
Asian Games
Bronze medal – third place	2018 Jakarta–Palembang	Individual kata
Asian Championships
Silver medal – second place	2017 Astana	Individual kata
Silver medal – second place	2019 Tashkent	Individual kata
Silver medal – second place	2021 Almaty	Individual kata
Silver medal – second place	2022 Tashkent	Individual kata
Islamic Solidarity Games
Bronze medal – third place	2021 Konya	Individual kata
SEA Games
Gold medal – first place	2019 Philippines	Individual kata
Gold medal – first place	2021 Vietnam	Individual kata
Gold medal – first place	2023 Cambodia	Individual kata
Silver medal – second place	2017 Kuala Lumpur	Individual kata
Southeast Asian Championships
Gold medal – first place	2022 Phnom Penh	Individual kata
Gold medal – first place	2023 Manila	Individual kata
ASEAN University Games
Gold medal – first place	2022 Ubon Ratchathani	Individual kata
World Championships Junior
Gold medal – first place	2015 Jakarta	Junior kata
Asian Championships Junior
Silver medal – second place	2016 Makassar	U21 kata

Ahmad Zigi Zaresta Yuda (born 14 January 1998) is an Indonesian karateka competing in the men's kata event. He won the gold medal in the men's individual kata event at the 2019 SEA Games held in Manila, Philippines. He also won the gold medal in the men's individual kata event at the 2021 SEA Games held in Hanoi, Vietnam.

== Career ==
At the 2017 Asian Karate Championships held in Astana, Kazakhstan, he won the silver medal in the men's kata event. He repeated this at the 2019 Asian Karate Championships held in Tashkent, Uzbekistan.

In 2018, he won one of the bronze medals in the men's kata event at the Asian Games held in Jakarta, Indonesia.

In June 2021, he competed at the World Olympic Qualification Tournament held in Paris, France hoping to qualify for the 2020 Summer Olympics in Tokyo, Japan. In November 2021, he competed in the men's individual kata event at the World Karate Championships held in Dubai, United Arab Emirates. In December 2021, he won the silver medal in his event at the Asian Karate Championships held in Almaty, Kazakhstan.

He won one of the bronze medals in the men's individual kata event at the 2021 Islamic Solidarity Games held in Konya, Turkey. He won the silver medal in the men's individual kata event at the 2022 Asian Karate Championships held in Tashkent, Uzbekistan. In 2023, he competed in the men's kata event at the 2022 Asian Games held in Hangzhou, China.

== Achievements ==
Year	Competition	Venue	Rank	Event
2015	World Championships Junior	Jakarta, Indonesia	1st	Junior kata
2016	Asian Championships Junior	Makassar, Indonesia	2nd	U21 kata
2017	Asian Championships	Astana, Kazakhstan	2nd	Individual kata
2017	SEA Games	Kuala Lumpur, Malaysia	2nd	Individual kata
2018	Asian Games	Jakarta, Indonesia	3rd	Individual kata
2018	Karate1 Series A	Shanghai, China	2nd	Individual kata
2019	Asian Championships	Tashkent, Uzbekistan	2nd	Individual kata
2019	SEA Games	Manila, Philippines	1st	Individual kata
2021	Asian Championships	Almaty, Kazakhstan	2nd	Individual kata
2022	Southeast Asian Championships	Phnom Penh, Cambodia	1st	Individual kata
2022	SEA Games	Hanoi, Vietnam	1st	Individual kata
2022	ASEAN University Games	Ubon Ratchathani, Thailand	1st	Individual kata
2022	Islamic Solidarity Games	Konya, Turkey	3rd	Individual kata
2022	Asian Championships	Tashkent, Uzbekistan	2nd	Individual kata
2023	Southeast Asian Championships	Manila, Philippines	1st	Individual kata
2023	SEA Games	Phnom Penh, Cambodia	1st	Individual kata
