= Tareg Hamedi =

Saudi Arabian karateka (born 1998)

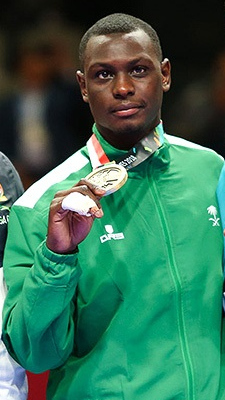
- Hamedi at the 2018 Asian Games

Personal information
- Native name: طارق حامدي
- Full name: Tareg Ali Hamedi
- Born: 26 July 1998 (age 28)

Sport
- Country: Saudi Arabia
- Sport: Karate
- Weight class: +84 kg; +75 kg (Olympic Games)
- Event: Kumite
Medal record
Men's karate
Representing Saudi Arabia
Olympic Games
Silver medal – second place	2020 Tokyo	Kumite +75 kg
Asian Games
Bronze medal – third place	2018 Jakarta–Palembang	Kumite +84 kg
Bronze medal – third place	2022 Hangzhou	Kumite +84 kg
Asian Championships
Gold medal – first place	2017 Astana	Kumite +84 kg
Gold medal – first place	2019 Tashkent	Kumite +84 kg
Gold medal – first place	2021 Almaty	Kumite +84 kg
Gold medal – first place	2023 Malacca	Kumite +84 kg
Silver medal – second place	2018 Amman	Team kumite
Silver medal – second place	2019 Tashkent	Team kumite
Bronze medal – third place	2018 Amman	Kumite +84 kg
Bronze medal – third place	2021 Almaty	Team kumite
Karate1 Premier League
Gold medal – first place	2016 Okinawa	Kumite +84 kg
Bronze medal – third place	2018 Dubai	Kumite +84 kg
Bronze medal – third place	2020 Dubai	Kumite +84 kg
Islamic Solidarity Games
Gold medal – first place	2021 Konya	Kumite +84 kg
World Championships Junior
Gold medal – first place	2015 Jakarta	Junior kumite 76+ kg

Tareg Ali Hamedi (Arabic: طارق حامدي; born 26 July 1998) is a Saudi Arabian karateka. He represented Saudi Arabia at the 2020 Summer Olympics in Tokyo, Japan. He won the silver medal in the men's +75 kg event after being disqualified for knocking out his opponent with an illegal kick. He is an eight-time medalist, including four gold medals, at the Asian Karate Championships. He is also a gold medalist at the 2021 Islamic Solidarity Games and a two-time bronze medalist at the Asian Games.

== Career ==
Hamedi became world champion in the junior kumite 76+ kg event at the 2015 World Junior, Cadet and U21 Championships held in Jakarta, Indonesia. In 2016, he won his first gold medal in the Karate1 Premier League. He secured the gold medal in the men's kumite +84 kg event at the Karate1 Premier League event held in Okinawa, Japan.

At the 2017 Asian Karate Championships held in Astana, Kazakhstan, Hamedi defeated Sajjad Ganjzadeh of Iran (world champion in this event at the time) to win the gold medal in the men's kumite +84 kg event. In 2018, he won one of the bronze medals in the men's kumite +84 kg event at the Asian Karate Championships held in Amman, Jordan. He also won the silver medal in the men's team kumite event. A few days later, he won one of the bronze medals in the men's team kumite event at the World University Karate Championships held in Kobe, Japan. A month later, he won one of the bronze medals in men's kumite +84 kg event at the 2018 Asian Games held in Jakarta, Indonesia.

At the 2019 Asian Karate Championships held in Tashkent, Uzbekistan, Hamedi won two medals: the gold medal in the men's kumite +84 kg event and the silver medal in the men's team kumite event.

In 2021, Hamedi qualified at the World Olympic Qualification Tournament held in Paris, France to compete at the 2020 Summer Olympics in Tokyo, Japan. He won the silver medal in the men's +75 kg event. This was Saudi Arabia's second silver medal and fourth medal overall across all Olympic games. A few months after the Olympics, he competed in the men's +84 kg event at the World Karate Championships held in Dubai, United Arab Emirates. At the 2021 Asian Karate Championships held in Almaty, Kazakhstan, he won two medals: the gold medal in the men's kumite +84 kg event and one of the bronze medals in the men's team kumite event.

Hamedi won the gold medal in the men's +84 kg event at the 2021 Islamic Solidarity Games held in Konya, Turkey. He defeated Asiman Gurbanli of Azerbaijan in his gold medal match.

In 2023, Hamedi won the gold medal in his event at the Asian Karate Championships held in Malacca, Malaysia. He also won one of the bronze medals in the men's kumite +84 kg event at the 2022 Asian Games held in Hangzhou, China.

== Achievements ==
Year	Competition	Location	Rank	Event
2015	World Championships Junior	Jakarta, Indonesia	1st	Junior kumite +76 kg
2017	Asian Championships	Astana, Kazakhstan	1st	Kumite +84 kg
2018	Asian Championships	Amman, Jordan	3rd	Kumite +84 kg
2018	Asian Championships	Amman, Jordan	2nd	Team kumite
2018	Asian Games	Jakarta, Indonesia	3rd	Kumite +84 kg
2019	Asian Championships	Tashkent, Uzbekistan	1st	Kumite +84 kg
2019	Asian Championships	Tashkent, Uzbekistan	2nd	Team kumite
2021	Olympic Games	Tokyo, Japan	2nd	Kumite +75 kg
2021	Asian Championships	Almaty, Kazakhstan	1st	Kumite +84 kg
2021	Asian Championships	Almaty, Kazakhstan	3rd	Team kumite
2022	Islamic Solidarity Games	Konya, Turkey	1st	Kumite +84 kg
2023	Asian Championships	Malacca, Malaysia	1st	Kumite +84 kg
2023	Asian Games	Hangzhou, China	3rd	Kumite +84 kg
