= Cok Istri Agung Sanistyarani =

Indonesian karateka (born 1994)

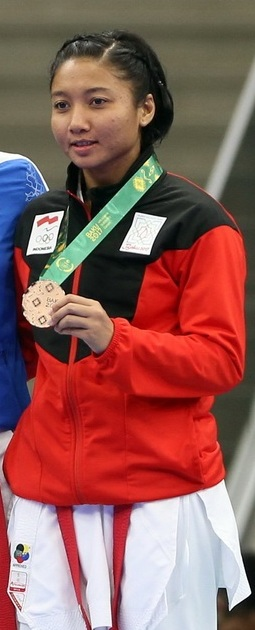
- Sanistyarani in 2017

Personal information
- Full name: Cokorda Istri Agung Sanistyarani
- Born: 31 December 1994 (age 31) Klungkung, Bali, Indonesia

Sport
- Country: Indonesia
- Sport: Karate
- Weight class: 55 kg
- Events: Kumite; Team kumite
Medal record
Women's karate
Representing Indonesia
Asian Games
Bronze medal – third place	2018 Jakarta–Palembang	Kumite 55 kg
Bronze medal – third place	2026 Aichi–Nagoya	Kumite 55 kg
Asian Championships
Silver medal – second place	2018 Amman	Kumite 55 kg
Bronze medal – third place	2017 Astana	Kumite 55 kg
Bronze medal – third place	2019 Tashkent	Kumite 55 kg
Bronze medal – third place	2021 Almaty	Kumite 55 kg
Bronze medal – third place	2026 Bali	Team kumite
Islamic Solidarity Games
Bronze medal – third place	2013 Palembang	Kumite 61 kg
Bronze medal – third place	2017 Baku	Kumite 55 kg
SEA Games
Gold medal – first place	2017 Kuala Lumpur	Kumite 61 kg
Gold medal – first place	2021 Vietnam	Kumite 55 kg
Silver medal – second place	2013 Naypyidaw	Team kumite
Silver medal – second place	2021 Vietnam	Team kumite
Silver medal – second place	2023 Cambodia	Kumite 55 kg
Bronze medal – third place	2013 Naypyidaw	Kumite 61 kg
Bronze medal – third place	2023 Cambodia	Team kumite
Bronze medal – third place	2025 Thailand	Team kumite
Southeast Asian Championships
Gold medal – first place	2022 Phnom Penh	Team kumite
Silver medal – second place	2022 Phnom Penh	Kumite 55 kg
Bronze medal – third place	2023 Manila	Kumite 55 kg

Cok Istri Agung Sanistyarani (born 31 December 1994) is an Indonesian karateka. She won the gold medal in the women's kumite 61 kg event at the 2017 SEA Games held in Kuala Lumpur, Malaysia. She won one of the bronze medals in the women's kumite 55 kg event at the 2018 Asian Games held in Jakarta, Indonesia. She also won multiple medals at both the Islamic Solidarity Games and the Asian Karate Championships.

== Career ==
She won one of the bronze medals in the women's kumite 61 kg event at the 2013 Islamic Solidarity Games held in Palembang, Indonesia. In 2014, she competed in the women's kumite 55 kg event at the Asian Games held in Incheon, South Korea where she lost her bronze medal match against Mae Soriano of the Philippines.

At the 2018 Asian Karate Championships held in Amman, Jordan, she won the silver medal in the women's kumite 55 kg event. In 2019, she won one of the bronze medals in this event.

In June 2021, she competed at the World Olympic Qualification Tournament held in Paris, France hoping to qualify for the 2020 Summer Olympics in Tokyo, Japan. In November 2021, she competed in the women's 55 kg event at the World Karate Championships held in Dubai, United Arab Emirates. In December 2021, she won one of the bronze medals in her event at the Asian Karate Championships held in Almaty, Kazakhstan.

In 2022, she competed at the 2021 Islamic Solidarity Games held in Konya, Turkey. In 2023, she lost her bronze medal match in the women's 55 kg event at the 2022 Asian Games held in Hangzhou, China.

== Achievements ==
Year	Competition	Venue	Rank	Event
2013	Karate1 Premier League	Jakara, Indonesia	3rd	Kumite 61 kg
2013	Islamic Solidarity Games	Palembang, Indonesia	3rd	Kumite 61 kg
2013	SEA Games	Naypyidaw, Myanmar	3rd	Kumite 61 kg
2013	SEA Games	Naypyidaw, Myanmar	2nd	Team kumite
2017	Karate1 Premier League	Rotterdam, Netherlands	3rd	Kumite 55 kg
2017	Islamic Solidarity Games	Baku, Azerbaijan	3rd	Kumite 55 kg
2017	Asian Championships	Astana, Kazakhstan	3rd	Kumite 55 kg
2017	SEA Games	Kuala Lumpur, Malaysia	1st	Kumite 61 kg
2018	Asian Championships	Amman, Jordan	2nd	Kumite 55 kg
2018	Asian Games	Jakarta, Indonesia	3rd	Kumite 55 kg
2019	Asian Championships	Tashkent, Uzbekistan	3rd	Kumite 55 kg
2021	Asian Championships	Almaty, Kazakhstan	3rd	Kumite 55 kg
2022	Southeast Asian Championships	Phnom Penh, Cambodia	2nd	Kumite 55 kg
2022	Southeast Asian Championships	Phnom Penh, Cambodia	1st	Team kumite
2022	SEA Games	Hanoi, Vietnam	1st	Kumite 55 kg
2022	SEA Games	Hanoi, Vietnam	2nd	Team kumite
2023	Southeast Asian Championships	Manila, Philippines	3rd	Kumite 55 kg
2023	SEA Games	Phnom Penh, Cambodia	2nd	Kumite 55 kg
2023	SEA Games	Phnom Penh, Cambodia	3rd	Team kumite
2023	Karate1 Premier League	Dublin, Ireland	3rd	Kumite 55 kg
2025	SEA Games	Bangkok, Thailand	3rd	Team kumite
2026	Asian Championships	Bali, Indonesia	3rd	Team kumite
2026	Asian Games	Aichi and Nagoya, Japan	3rd	Kumite 55 kg
