= Nguyễn Minh Phụng =

Vietnamese karateka (born 1991)

Personal information
- Born: 22 January 1991 (age 35)

Sport
- Country: Vietnam
- Sport: Karate
- Event: Kumite
Medal record
Men's karate
Representing Vietnam
Asian Games
Silver medal – second place	2018 Jakarta	Kumite +84 kg
Southeast Asian Games
Gold medal – first place	2017 Kuala Lumpur	Kumite +75 kg
Gold medal – first place	2017 Kuala Lumpur	Team kumite

Nguyễn Minh Phụng (born 22 January 1991) is a Vietnamese karateka. He won the silver medal in the men's kumite +84 kg event at the 2018 Asian Games held in Jakarta, Indonesia. In the final, he lost against Sajjad Ganjzadeh of Iran.

In 2017, he won the gold medal in the men's +75 kg event and the men's team kumite event at the Southeast Asian Games held in Kuala Lumpur, Malaysia.

== Achievements ==
Year	Competition	Venue	Rank	Event
2017	Southeast Asian Games	Kuala Lumpur, Malaysia	1st	Kumite +75 kg
2017	Southeast Asian Games	Kuala Lumpur, Malaysia	1st	Team kumite
2018	Asian Games	Jakarta, Indonesia	2nd	Kumite +84 kg
