= Celine Lee =

Malaysian karateka (born 1994)

Celine Lee Xin Yi
Personal information
- Born: 30 June 1994 (age 32)

Sport
- Country: Malaysia
- Sport: Karate
- Events: Individual kata; Team kata
Medal record
Women's karate
Representing Malaysia
Southeast Asian Games
Gold medal – first place	2017 Kuala Lumpur	Individual kata
Silver medal – second place	2011 Jakarta	Team kata
Silver medal – second place	2017 Kuala Lumpur	Team kata
Silver medal – second place	2019 Philippines	Team kata
Bronze medal – third place	2013 Naypyidaw	Team kata
Islamic Solidarity Games
Bronze medal – third place	2013 Palembang	Individual kata
Asian Karate Championships
Silver medal – second place	2018 Amman	Individual kata
Silver medal – second place	2018 Amman	Team kata
Bronze medal – third place	2015 Yokohama	Individual kata
Bronze medal – third place	2017 Astana	Individual kata
Bronze medal – third place	2017 Astana	Team kata

Celine Lee Xin Yi (born 30 June 1994) is a Malaysian karateka. She won the gold medal in the women's individual kata event at the 2017 Southeast Asian Games in Kuala Lumpur, Malaysia.

She won one of the bronze medals in the women's individual kata event at the 2013 Islamic Solidarity Games held in Palembang, Indonesia.

At the 2018 Asian Karate Championships held in Amman, Jordan, she won the silver medal in the women's kata event. In 2018, she also represented Malaysia at the Asian Games in the women's kata event where she was eliminated in her second match by Monsicha Tararattanakul of Thailand. In the same year, she also competed in the women's individual kata event at the World Karate Championships held in Madrid, Spain.
