= Ceyco Georgia Zefanya =

Indonesian karateka (born 1999)

Personal information
- Born: 24 June 1999 (age 27)

Sport
- Country: Indonesia
- Sport: Karate
- Weight class: 68 kg
- Events: Kumite; Team kumite
Medal record
Women's karate
Representing Indonesia
World Championships
Bronze medal – third place	2023 Budapest	Kumite 68 kg
Asian Championships
Gold medal – first place	2019 Tashkent	Kumite 68 kg
Gold medal – first place	2023 Malacca	Kumite 68 kg
Bronze medal – third place	2018 Amman	Kumite 68 kg
Bronze medal – third place	2022 Tashkent	Kumite 68 kg
Bronze medal – third place	2026 Bali	Team kumite
Karate1 Premier League
Bronze medal – third place	2023 Dublin	Kumite 68 kg
Karate1 Series A
Bronze medal – third place	2022 Jakarta	Kumite 68 kg
SEA Games
Silver medal – second place	2019 Philippines	Kumite +61 kg
Silver medal – second place	2021 Vietnam	Kumite 68 kg
Silver medal – second place	2021 Vietnam	Team kumite
Silver medal – second place	2025 Thailand	Kumite 68 kg
Bronze medal – third place	2023 Cambodia	Kumite 68 kg
Bronze medal – third place	2023 Cambodia	Team kumite
Bronze medal – third place	2025 Thailand	Team kumite
Southeast Asian Championships
Gold medal – first place	2022 Phnom Penh	Team kumite
Gold medal – first place	2023 Manila	Kumite 68 kg
Silver medal – second place	2022 Phnom Penh	Kumite 68 kg
ASEAN University Games
Gold medal – first place	2018 Naypyidaw	Kumite +61 kg
Gold medal – first place	2022 Ubon Ratchathani	Kumite 68 kg
Gold medal – first place	2022 Ubon Ratchathani	Team kumite
Gold medal – first place	2024 Surabaya–Malang	Kumite 68 kg
Gold medal – first place	2024 Surabaya–Malang	Team kumite
World Championships Junior
Gold medal – first place	2015 Jakarta	Kumite +59 kg
Asian Championships Junior
Bronze medal – third place	2016 Makassar	Kumite +59 kg

Ceyco Georgia Zefanya (born 24 June 1999) is an Indonesian karateka. She competes in the women's kumite 68 kg and team kumite events. She is a five-time medalist at the SEA Games and a five-time medalist, including two gold medals, at the Asian Karate Championships.

== Career ==
She competed in the women's kumite 68 kg event at the 2018 Asian Games held in Jakarta, Indonesia without winning a medal. She was eliminated in her first match by Nguyễn Thị Ngoan of Vietnam.

At the 2018 Asian Karate Championships held in Amman, Jordan, she won one of the bronze medals in the women's kumite 68 kg event. The following year, at the 2019 Asian Karate Championships held in Tashkent, Uzbekistan, she won the silver medal in the women's kumite 68 kg event. This became the gold medal after a confirmed doping violation of Nodira Djumaniyazova of Uzbekistan, the original gold medalist.

In June 2021, she competed at the World Olympic Qualification Tournament held in Paris, France hoping to qualify for the 2020 Summer Olympics in Tokyo, Japan. She was eliminated in her second match. In November 2021, she competed in the women's 68 kg event at the World Karate Championships held in Dubai, United Arab Emirates.

She won the silver medal in her event at the 2021 SEA Games held in Hanoi, Vietnam. She also won the silver medal in the women's team kumite event.

She won one of the bronze medals in her event at the 2022 Asian Karate Championships held in Tashkent, Uzbekistan. In 2023, she won the gold medal in her event at the Asian Karate Championships held in Malacca, Malaysia. She lost her bronze medal match in the women's kumite 68 kg event at the 2022 Asian Games held in Hangzhou, China. In the same month, she won one of the bronze medals in the women's 68 kg event at the 2023 World Karate Championships held in Budapest, Hungary. She defeated Madeleine Schröter of Germany in her bronze medal match.

== Achievements ==
Year	Competition	Venue	Rank	Event
2015	World Championships Junior	Jakarta, Indonesia	1st	Kumite +59 kg
2016	Asian Championships Junior	Makassar, Indonesia	3rd	Kumite +59 kg
2018	Asian Championships	Amman, Jordan	3rd	Kumite 68 kg
2018	ASEAN University Games	Naypyidaw, Myanmar	1st	Kumite +61 kg
2019	Asian Championships	Tashkent, Uzbekistan	1st	Kumite 68 kg
2019	SEA Games	Manila, Philippines	2nd	Kumite +61 kg
2022	SEA Games	Hanoi, Vietnam	2nd	Kumite 68 kg
2022	SEA Games	Hanoi, Vietnam	2nd	Team kumite
2022	ASEAN University Games	Ubon Ratchathani, Thailand	1st	Kumite 68 kg
2022	ASEAN University Games	Ubon Ratchathani, Thailand	1st	Team kumite
2022	Asian Championships	Tashkent, Uzbekistan	3rd	Kumite 68 kg
2023	Southeast Asian Championships	Manila, Philippines	1st	Kumite 68 kg
2023	SEA Games	Phnom Penh, Cambodia	3rd	Kumite 68 kg
2023	SEA Games	Phnom Penh, Cambodia	3rd	Team kumite
2023	Asian Championships	Malacca, Malaysia	1st	Kumite 68 kg
2023	Karate1 Premier League	Dublin, Ireland	3rd	Kumite 68 kg
2023	World Championships	Budapest, Hungary	3rd	Kumite 68 kg
2023	Moscow Karate Universe International	Moscow, Russia	2nd	Kumite 68 kg
