= Wang Yi-ta =

Taiwanese karateka

- Born: August 28, 1991 (age 35)
- Style: Kata

Wang Yi-ta (Chinese: 王翌達; pinyin: Wáng Yìdá) is a Taiwanese karateka.

Wang won third place at the Karate1 Premier League games in Busan in 2012, and took second place at the Karate1 Premier League games in Paris in 2018, and two third places at the events in Rotterdam and Rabat. He has competed several times at the Asian Karate Championships, winning silver at the 2013 Championships in Dubai, bronze at the 2017 Championships in Astana, and silver at the 2018 Championships in Amman.

At the 2018 Asian Games in Jakarta, Wang competed in the Men's kata events, defeating Chris Cheng, Kuok Kin Hang, and Park Heejun to reach the final, but losing to Ryo Kiyuna of Japan, to take the silver medal. At the 2019 World Beach Games in Doha, Wang took silver in the Kata. Wang, then 13th in the World Karate Federation's rankings, defeated a number of higher-ranked favourites to reach the final. He completed at the 2020 Summer Olympics, finishing fifth in his pool during the elimination round.

== Achievements ==
Year	Competition	Venue	Rank	Event
2019	World Beach Games	Doha, Qatar	2nd	Individual kata
2018	Asian games	Jakarta and Palembang, Indonesia	2nd	Men's Kata
2018	Asian Karate Championships	Amman, Jordan	2nd	Individual kata
2017	Asian Karate Championships	Astana, Kazakhstan	3rd	Individual kata
2013	Asian Karate Championships	Dubai, United Arab Emirates	2nd	Individual kata
