= Hồ Thị Thu Hiền =

Vietnamese karateka (born 1995)

Personal information
- Born: 4 November 1995 (age 30)

Sport
- Country: Vietnam
- Sport: Karate
- Event: Kumite
Medal record
Women's karate
Representing Vietnam
Asian Championships
| Gold medal – first place | 2021 Almaty | Team kumite |
| Silver medal – second place | 2018 Amman | Kumite 68 kg |
| Bronze medal – third place | 2017 Astana | Kumite 68 kg |
| Bronze medal – third place | 2018 Amman | Team kumite |
| Bronze medal – third place | 2019 Tashkent | Team kumite |
| Bronze medal – third place | 2021 Almaty | Kumite 68 kg |
Southeast Asian Games
| Gold medal – first place | 2017 Kuala Lumpur | Kumite 68 kg |
| Bronze medal – third place | 2019 Philippines | Kumite 61 kg |

Hồ Thị Thu Hiền (born 4 November 1995) is a Vietnamese karateka. She won the gold medal in the women's kumite 68 kg event at the 2017 Southeast Asian Games held in Kuala Lumpur, Malaysia. She also won one of the bronze medals in the women's kumite 61 kg event at the 2019 Southeast Asian Games held in the Philippines.

She competed in the women's kumite 61 kg event at the 2018 Asian Games held in Jakarta, Indonesia.

In 2021, she won one of the bronze medals in her event at the Asian Karate Championships held in Almaty, Kazakhstan. She also won the gold medal in the women's team kumite event.

== Achievements ==
| Year | Competition | Venue | Rank | Event |
|---|---|---|---|---|
| 2017 | Asian Championships | Astana, Kazakhstan | 3rd | Kumite 68 kg |
| 2017 | Southeast Asian Games | Kuala Lumpur, Malaysia | 1st | Kumite 68 kg |
| 2018 | Asian Championships | Amman, Jordan | 2nd | Kumite 68 kg |
| 2018 | Asian Championships | Amman, Jordan | 3rd | Team kumite |
| 2019 | Asian Championships | Tashkent, Uzbekistan | 3rd | Team kumite |
| 2019 | Southeast Asian Games | Manila, Philippines | 3rd | Kumite 61 kg |
| 2021 | Asian Championships | Almaty, Kazakhstan | 3rd | Kumite 68 kg |
| 2021 | Asian Championships | Almaty, Kazakhstan | 1st | Team kumite |
