= Darlene Berberabe =

Filipino lawyer and 39th Solicitor General of the Philippines

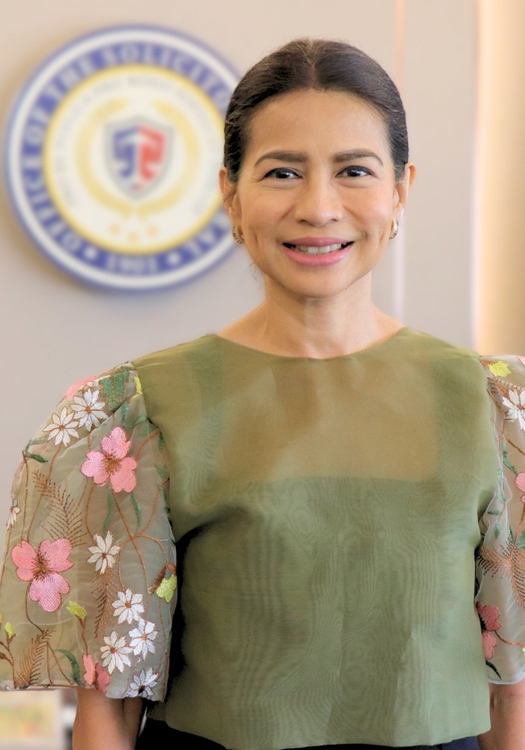
- Official portrait, 2025

39th Solicitor General of the Philippines
- Incumbent
- Assumed office May 29, 2025
- President: Bongbong Marcos
- Preceded by: Menardo Guevarra

17th Dean of the University of the Philippines College of Law
- In office November 30, 2023 – August 28, 2025
- Preceded by: Edgardo Vistan
- Succeeded by: Gwen Grecia-De Vera

Personal details
- Born: Darlene Marie Basco Berberabe
- Spouse: Samboy Lim (sep. 2008)
- Children: Jamie Lim
- Education: University of the Philippines Diliman (BA, MA, LLB)
- Occupation: Lawyer; academic administrator; corporate executive

Darlene Marie "Lelen" Basco Berberabe is a Filipino lawyer, academic, and former corporate executive who has served as the 39th solicitor general of the Philippines since 2025. She previously served as the 17th dean of the University of the Philippines College of Law from 2023 to 2025.

A graduate of the University of the Philippines Diliman (UP), Berberabe began her legal career in the private sector, working for Baker McKenzie and Procter & Gamble Philippines. In 2010, she became the chief executive officer of the Pag-IBIG Fund, a position she held until 2017 before returning to private practice. In 2023, she succeeded Edgardo Vistan as dean of the UP College of Law, becoming the third woman to hold the office.

In 2025, President Bongbong Marcos appointed Berberabe as solicitor general during a major cabinet reshuffle, making her the second woman after Agnes Devanadera to hold the post. Before her appointment, she was briefly considered as a nominee to succeed retiring Associate Justice Mario Lopez.

Berberabe is the widow of professional basketball player Samboy Lim and the mother of athlete and 2019 SEA Games gold medalist Jamie Lim.

== Early life and education ==
Berberabe was raised in Batangas City as the fourth of five children. Her father was a mayor of their city while her mother was a medical doctor for the Government Service Insurance System.

Berberabe studied at the University of the Philippines (UP), where graduated summa cum laude in 1989 with a Bachelor's Degree in philosophy. She pursued postgraduate studies in the same institution, earning her Master's Degree in 1995 and her Bachelor of Laws in 1999.

== Career ==
=== Philosophy teaching ===
Berberabe became the first female Philosophy instructor in the University of the Philippines. She taught for 10 years and also got her masters degree in philosophy in the same university.

=== Early legal career ===
After obtaining her law degree, Berberabe was employed at the multinational law firm Baker McKenzie as an associate lawyer specializing in labor law. She was later hired as a senior counsel for Procter & Gamble Philippines working under CEO James Michael Lafferty and held that role for six years.

=== CEO of the Pag-IBIG Fund (2010–2017) ===
In 2010, President Benigno Aquino III appointed Berberabe as the chief executive officer (CEO) of the Pag-IBIG Fund on the advice of Vice President Jejomar Binay, who concurrently served as chairman of the Housing and Urban Development Coordinating Council. Berberabe was initially reluctant to accept the position, having planned to accept an offer from P&G for a position in Singapore. After repeated requests from Binay, she ultimately decided to stay in the Philippines and resign from P&G to take the office. Her appointment to the opposition was met with scrutiny, given her ties to Binay through her sister's marriage to Binay's chief of staff.

In 2014, following the Globe Asiatique housing loan scandal, Berberabe instituted a more rigid borrower evaluation system to avoid a repeat of the incident.

In January 2015, the Senate Blue Ribbon Committee probed Berberabe and Binay for alleged anomalies involving the latter. Senator Antonio Trillanes alleged Berberabe of conflict of interest and compliance with Binay's "pattern of corruption", noting that the corporation granted millions worth of developmental loans to four companies headed by Binay's associates under her leadership. She denied the allegations, affirming the corporation's strict processes in awarding loans and noting that the said loan agreements have already been "flagged off".

Leading up to the 2016 Philippine presidential election, Vice President Binay, who ran for president, stated that he would appoint Berberabe as secretary of education if he were to win the election.

Berberabe resigned from office on February 28, 2017, to pursue other ventures. President Rodrigo Duterte subsequently appointed Acmad Rizaldy Moti as the officer in charge of the position.

=== Return to the private sector (2017–2023) ===
Shortly following her resignation as the CEO of Pag-IBIG, Berberabe became the CEO of Philab Industries. She would depart from the role on October 9, 2017. On April 21, 2021, SM Prime appointed Berberabe as an independent director alongside two others.

=== Dean of the UP College of Law (2023–2025) ===
On November 30, 2023, the UP Board of Regents appointed Berberabe as dean of the UP College of Law, succeeding Edgardo Vistan, who became chancellor. Upon taking office, Berberabe became the third woman to hold the office. In applying for the position, she emphasized the values of "open-mindedness, openness to discourse and professionalism" in a prospective deanship.

During her tenure, Berberabe signed a memorandum of understanding with the Department of Justice in exploring approaches for the modernization of the Revised Penal Code. The partnership aimed to complete a draft of an updated criminal code to be subject to congressional approval by June 2025. She left the deanship following her appointment as solicitor general and was succeeded by Gwen Grecia-De Vera.

== Solicitor General of the Philippines (since 2025) ==
=== Appointment ===
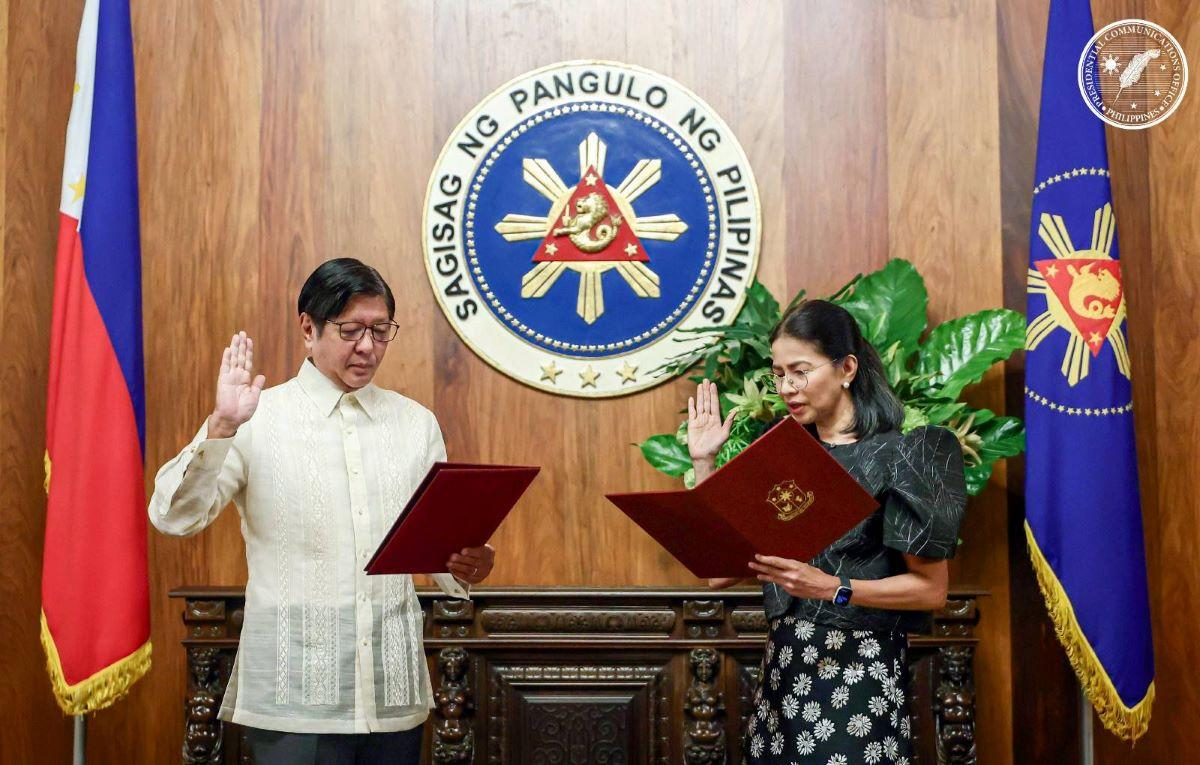
Berberabe being sworn in as solicitor general by President Bongbong Marcos on May 29, 2025

In May 2025, the Judicial and Bar Council vetted Berberabe as a potential successor to Associate Justice Mario Lopez, who was due to retire on June 4. The council publicly interviewed her for the position on May 14, alongside other applicants considered by the body. While her lack of litigation experience was a concern during her interview, she was included as the third applicant in the shortlist transmitted to President Bongbong Marcos on May 30. With a major cabinet reshuffle ongoing concurrently, Berberabe was speculated as a potential appointee to the Marcos Cabinet. Mary Ann Reyes of The Philippine Star regarded Berberabe as a potential asset to the Marcos administration if named solicitor general, owing to her credentials and track record.

President Marcos went on to appoint Berberabe as solicitor general on May 29, 2025. Her predecessor, Menardo Guevarra, welcomed her appointment to the office, describing her as a "top-caliber lawyer" with an extensive background. House Speaker Martin Romualdez praised the appointment, deeming Berberabe to be highly equipped for the role's demands.

=== Tenure ===
Berberabe took oath as solicitor general on May 29, becoming the second woman after Agnes Devanadera to hold the office.

== Personal life ==
Berberabe was married to professional basketball player Samboy Lim before separating in 2008. Together, they have one child: Jamie Lim, who is a 2019 SEA Games gold medalist.

Political offices
Preceded by Menardo Guevarra	Solicitor General of the Philippines; 2025–present	Incumbent
Order of precedence
Preceded by Elaine Masukat as Head of the Presidential Management Staff	Order of Precedence of the Philippines as Solicitor General of the Philippines	Succeeded by Anna Liza Logan as Chief Presidential Legal Counsel
