= Karate at the 2010 Asian Games – Men's kata =

Karate competitions

Men's kata at the 2010 Asian Games
- Venue: Guangdong Gymnasium
- Date: 24 November 2010
- Competitors: 15 from 15 nations

Medalists
| gold medal | Ku Jin Keat | Malaysia |
| silver medal | Itaru Oki | Japan |
| bronze medal | Yousef Al-Harbi | Athletes from Kuwait |
| bronze medal | Faisal Zainuddin | Indonesia |

The men's individual kata competition at the 2010 Asian Games in Guangzhou, China was held on 24 November 2010 at the Guangdong Gymnasium.

== Schedule ==
All times are China Standard Time (UTC+08:00)

| Date | Time | Event |
|---|---|---|
| Wednesday, 24 November 2010 | 09:30 | 1/8 finals |
| Wednesday, 24 November 2010 | 09:30 | Quarterfinals |
| Wednesday, 24 November 2010 | 09:30 | Semifinals |
| Wednesday, 24 November 2010 | 09:30 | Repechage 1 |
| Wednesday, 24 November 2010 | 09:30 | Bronze medal match |
| Wednesday, 24 November 2010 | 09:30 | Final |

== Results ==
=== Main bracket ===
1/8 finals
Noel Espinosa (PHI) | 0
Itaru Oki (JPN) | 5
Vikash Sharma (IND) | 0
Mukhammadzaid Iminov (UZB) | 5
Yousef Al-Harbi (IOC) | 3
Yen Tzu-yao (TPE) | 2
Chris Cheng (HKG) | 0
Ku Jin Keat (MAS) | 5
Kushal Shrestha (NEP) | 0
Dmitrii Kazanov (KGZ) | 5
Marwan Al-Maazmi (UAE) | 5
Md Hasan Khan (BAN) | 0
Rayappan Jebamalai Edward (SRI) | 0
Faisal Zainuddin (INA) | 5

Quarterfinals
Wong Hong Neng (MAC) | 0
Itaru Oki (JPN) | 5
Mukhammadzaid Iminov (UZB) | 0
Yousef Al-Harbi (IOC) | 5
Ku Jin Keat (MAS) | 5
Dmitrii Kazanov (KGZ) | 0
Marwan Al-Maazmi (UAE) | 1
Faisal Zainuddin (INA) | 4

Semifinals
Itaru Oki (JPN) | 4
Yousef Al-Harbi (IOC) | 1
Ku Jin Keat (MAS) | 4
Faisal Zainuddin (INA) | 1

Final
Itaru Oki (JPN) | 2
Ku Jin Keat (MAS) | 3

=== Repechage ===
Repechage 1
Noel Espinosa (PHI) | 4
Wong Hong Neng (MAC) | 1
Chris Cheng (HKG) | 5
Dmitrii Kazanov (KGZ) | 0

Bronze medal match
Noel Espinosa (PHI) | 0
Yousef Al-Harbi (IOC) | 5
Chris Cheng (HKG) | 1
Faisal Zainuddin (INA) | 4
