= Park Hee-jun (karateka) =

South Korean karateka

- Born: March 29, 1994 (age 32); South Korea
- Style: Kata

Park Hee-jun (born March 29, 1994) is a South Korean senior male karateka.

The 24-year-old became the first South Korean to win an Asian Games medal in kata, a non-sparring event in which practitioners demonstrate the Japanese martial art’s patterns and movements. Since karate became an Asiad medal sport, South Korea has won eight bronze medals over the last six Asian Games, all in kumite, a sparring discipline. He placed third in the Karate1 Premier League's 2014 Jakarta tournament.
