= 2025 World Karate Championships – Men's 60 kg =

Men's kumite 60 kg at the 2025 World Karate Championships
- Venue: Cairo Stadium Indoor Halls Complex
- Location: Cairo, Egypt
- Dates: 27–30 November
- Competitors: 32

Medalists
gold medal	Eray Şamdan	Turkey
silver medal	Islam Selmani	Kosovo
bronze medal	Christos-Stefanos Xenos	Greece
bronze medal	Hiromu Hashimoto	Japan

The men's kumite 60 kg competition at the 2025 World Karate Championships was held from 27 to 30 November 2025.

== Results ==
=== Group phase ===
==== Group A ====
Pos	Athlete	B	W	D	D^{0}	L	Pts	Score	(Georgia (country))	(Guatemala)	(Kuwait)	(Italy)
1	Tsotne Sordia (GEO)	3	2	0	0	1	6 (Note: Sordia (GEO) 4–1 De la Roca (GUA))	9–6	—	4–1	1–5	4–0
2	Pedropablo de la Roca (GUA)	3	2	0	0	1	6	11–6	1–4	—	6–0	4–2
3	Abdullah Shaaban (KUW)	3	1	0	1	1	3	5–7	5–1	0–6	—	0–0
4	Angelo Crescenzo (ITA)	3	0	0	1	2	0	2–8	0–4	2–4	0–0	—

==== Group B ====
Pos	Athlete	B	W	D	D^{0}	L	Pts	Score	(Turkey)	(Kosovo)	(Kyrgyzstan)	(Venezuela)
1	Eray Şamdan (TUR) [3]	3	2	0	0	1	6	10–3	—	1–3	7–0	2–0
2	Islam Selmani (KOS)	3	1	1	1	0	4	6–4	3–1	—	0–0	3–3
3	Bekzhan Kalykov (KGZ)	3	1	0	1	1	3	3–8	0–7	0–0	—	3–1
4	Jhoisber Chataing (VEN)	3	0	1	0	2	1	4–8	0–2	3–3	1–3	—

==== Group C ====
Pos	Athlete	B	W	D	D^{0}	L	Pts	Score		(Uzbekistan)	(Belgium)	(Colombia)
1	Akhmed Akhmedov (WKF-1)	3	2	0	0	1	6 (Note: Akhmedov (WKF) 10–0 Turakhonov (UZB))	14–7	—	10–0	0–4	4–3
2	Mekhriddin Turakhonov (UZB)	3	2	0	0	1	6	9–13	0–10	—	5–1	4–2
3	Anass Abdelmalki (BEL)	3	1	1	0	1	4	6–6	4–0	1–5	—	1–1
4	Juan Forero (COL)	3	0	1	0	2	1	6–9	3–4	2–4	1–1	—

==== Group D ====
Pos	Athlete	B	W	D	D^{0}	L	Pts	Score	(Greece)	(Iran)	(Ukraine)	(Burkina Faso)
1	Christos-Stefanos Xenos (GRE) [2]	3	3	0	0	0	9	13–2	—	4–0	2–2	7–0
2	Ali Meskini (IRI)	3	1	0	1	1	3 (Note: Meskini (IRI) 0–0 Filipov (UKR). Scores obtained: Meskini 9, Filipov 5.)	9–4	0–4	—	0–0	9–0
3	Nikita Filipov (UKR)	3	1	0	1	1	3	5–4	2–2	0–0	—	3–2
4	Mohamed Kaboré (BUR)	3	0	0	0	3	0	2–19	0–7	0–9	2–3	—

==== Group E ====
Pos	Athlete	B	W	D	D^{0}	L	Pts	Score	(Jordan)	(Montenegro)	(Benin)	(Chile)
1	Abdallah Hammad (JOR)	3	3	0	0	0	9	14–7	—	6–6	6–1	2–0
2	Balša Vojinović (MNE)	3	1	0	0	2	3 (Note: Vojinović (MNE) 1–1, Kpadonou (BEN) 1–1, Quijada (CHI) 1–1. Scores obtained: Vojinović 12, Kpadonou 7, Quijada 5. Kpadonou 5–4 Quijada.)	12–8	6–6	—	6–1	0–1
3	Martial Kpadonou (BEN)	3	1	0	0	2	3	7–16	1–6	1–6	—	5–4
4	Matías Quijada (CHI)	3	1	0	0	2	3	5–7	0–2	1–0	4–5	—

==== Group F ====
Pos	Athlete	B	W	D	D^{0}	L	Pts	Score	(Egypt)	(Saudi Arabia)	(Albania)	(Argentina)
1	Zyad Aly (EGY) [4]	3	3	0	0	0	9	13–6	—	2–1	6–2	5–3
2	Saud Al-Basher (KSA)	3	2	0	0	1	6	18–8	1–2	—	12–6	5–0
3	Orges Arifi (ALB)	3	1	0	0	2	3	11–20	2–6	6–12	—	3–2
4	Juan Gallardo (ARG)	3	0	0	0	3	0	5–13	3–5	0–5	2–3	—

==== Group G ====
Pos	Athlete	B	W	D	D^{0}	L	Pts	Score	(Romania)	(Kazakhstan)	(Australia)	(Chinese Taipei)
1	Erhan Tornaci (ROU)	3	3	0	0	0	9	7–1	—	3–1	1–0	3–0
2	Kaisar Alpysbay (KAZ)	3	2	0	0	1	6	5–4	1–3	—	2–0	2–1
3	Declan Squire (AUS)	3	1	0	0	2	3	3–3	0–1	0–2	—	3–0
4	Hsu Li-wei (TPE)	3	0	0	0	3	0	1–8	0–3	1–2	0–3	—

==== Group H ====
Pos	Athlete	B	W	D	D^{0}	L	Pts	Score	(Japan)	(Thailand)	(Tunisia)	(North Macedonia)
1	Hiromu Hashimoto (JPN) [1]	3	2	0	1	0	6 (Note: Hashimoto (JPN) 0–0 Muekthong (THA). Scores obtained: Hashimoto 15, Muekthong 4.)	15–4	—	0–0	8–2	7–2
2	Siwakon Muekthong (THA)	3	2	0	1	0	6	4–1	0–0	—	3–1	1–0
3	Mohamed Ayat (TUN)	3	1	0	0	2	3	5–11	2–8	1–3	—	2–0
4	Fahik Veseli (MKD)	3	0	0	0	3	0	2–10	2–7	0–1	0–2	—

=== Elimination phase ===
Round of 16; 27 November
Siwakon Muekthong (THA)	1
Tsotne Sordia (GEO)	3
Kaisar Alpysbay (KAZ)	0
Eray Şamdan (TUR)	5
Saud Al-Basher (KSA)	0
Akhmed Akhmedov (WKF-1)	4
Balša Vojinović (MNE)	0
Christos-Stefanos Xenos (GRE)	1
Ali Meskini (IRI)	5
Abdallah Hammad (JOR)	3
Mekhriddin Turakhonov (UZB)	2
Zyad Aly (EGY)	0
Islam Selmani (KOS)	6
Erhan Tornaci (ROU)	1
Pedropablo de la Roca (GUA)	0
Hiromu Hashimoto (JPN)	4

Quarterfinals; 29 November
Tsotne Sordia (GEO)	2
Eray Şamdan (TUR)	3
Akhmed Akhmedov (WKF-1)	0
Christos-Stefanos Xenos (GRE)	1
Ali Meskini (IRI)	1
Mekhriddin Turakhonov (UZB)	3
Islam Selmani (KOS)	6
Hiromu Hashimoto (JPN)	3

Semifinals; 29 November
Eray Şamdan (TUR)	1
Christos-Stefanos Xenos (GRE)	1
Mekhriddin Turakhonov (UZB)	1
Islam Selmani (KOS)	9

Final; 30 November
Eray Şamdan (TUR)	4
Islam Selmani (KOS)	0

Bronze medals 30 November
Tsotne Sordia (GEO)	3
Christos-Stefanos Xenos (GRE)	9
Hiromu Hashimoto (JPN)	5
Mekhriddin Turakhonov (UZB)	4
