= Turkey at the 2025 World Games =

- IOC code: TUR
- NOC: Turkish Olympic Committee

in Chengdu, China 7 August 2025 – 17 August 2025
- Competitors: 22 (10 men and 12 women) in 8 sports and 22 events
- Medals Ranked 37th: Gold 1 Silver 4 Bronze 0 Total 5

World Games appearances
- 1981; 1985; 1989; 1993; 1997; 2001; 2005; 2009; 2013; 2017; 2022; 2025

Turkey competed at the 2025 World Games held in Chengdu, China from 7 to 17 August 2025.

Athletes representing Turkey won one gold medal and four silver medals. The country finished in 37th place in the medal table.

== Medalists ==
| Medal | Name | Sport | Event | Day |
|---|---|---|---|---|
| Gold | Eray Şamdan | Karate | Men's kumite 60 kg | 8 August |
| Silver | Kübra Kocakuş | Muaythai | Women's 60 kg | 10 August |
| Silver | Emin Özer | Kickboxing | Men's K1 style 91 kg | 14 August |
| Silver | Aybüke Kılınç | Kickboxing | Women's point fighting 50 kg | 14 August |
| Silver | İnci Ece Öztürk | Boules sports | Women's precision shooting | 17 August |

== Competitors ==
The following is the list of number of competitors in the Games.

| Sport | Men | Women | Total |
|---|---|---|---|
| Air sports | 1 | 0 | 1 |
| Archery | 2 | 3 | 5 |
| Boules sports | 1 | 1 | 2 |
| Carom | 1 | 1 | 2 |
| Finswimming sports | 1 | 0 | 1 |
| Karate | 3 | 3 | 6 |
| Kickboxing | 1 | 2 | 3 |
| Muaythai | 0 | 2 | 2 |
| Total | 10 | 12 | 22 |

== Air sports ==
Drone Racing

| Athlete | Event | Classification | | Round of 32 Race 7 | | Round of 16 Race 4 | | Quarterfinal Race 2 | | Repechage Round 4 Race 2 | |
| Athlete | Event | Result | Rank | Result | Rank | Result | Rank | Result | Rank | Result | Rank |
|---|---|---|---|---|---|---|---|---|---|---|---|
| Nazım Tüzün | Drone racing | 28.863 | 10 | 1:35.667 | 1 Q | 1:35.383 | 1 Q | DNF | 3 q | DNF | 10 |

== Archery ==
Compound

| Athlete | Event | Ranking round | | Round of 32 | Round of 16 | Quarterfinals | Semifinals | Final / BM | |
| Athlete | Event | Score | Seed | Opposition Score | Opposition Score | Opposition Score | Opposition Score | Opposition Score | Rank |
|---|---|---|---|---|---|---|---|---|---|
| Batuhan Akçaoğlu | Men's individual | 704 | 14 | Kumar (IND); W 147–146 | Wiener (AUT); W 148–147 | Broadnax (USA); L 146-148 | Did not advance | | 6 |
| Yağız Sezgin | Men's individual | 704 | 15 | Ghazalli (MAS); W 147–145 | Fullerton (DEN); W 146–145 | Yadav (IND); L 145-147 | Did not advance | | 7 |
| Begüm Yuva | Women's individual | 699 | 7 | Bye | Paas (EST); L 141-146 | Did not advance | | | 9 |
| Öznur Cüre | Women's individual | 699 | 8 | Lin (CHN); W 145–138 | Gibson (GBR); L 145-150 | Did not advance | | | 9 |
| Hazal Burun | Women's individual | 681 | 20 | Roner (ITA); W 145–143 | Usquiano (COL); L 143-147 | Did not advance | | | 9 |
| Begüm Yuva; Batuhan Akçaoğlu | Mixed team | 1403 | 6 | — | | Mexico; L 155-156 | Did not advance | | 6 |

== Boules Sports ==
Lyonnaise

| Athlete | Event | Qualification | | Semifinals | Final / BM | |
| Athlete | Event | Result | Rank | Opposition Result | Opposition Result | Rank |
|---|---|---|---|---|---|---|
| Mehmet Can Yakın | Men's precision shooting | 73 | 6 | Did not advance | | |
| İnci Ece Öztürk | Women's precision shooting | 72 | 1 Q | Košir (SLO); W 39–27 | Chenyi (CHN); L 37–40 | 2nd place, silver medalist(s) |
| İnci Ece Öztürk; Mehmet Can Yakın | Quick shooting | 91 | 4 Q | Italy; L 44-47 | France; L 46-49 | 4 |

== Carom sports ==
| Athlete | Event | Preliminary round | | | | Quarterfinals | Semifinals | Final / BM | |
| Athlete | Event | Opposition Result | Opposition Result | Opposition Result | Rank | Opposition Result | Opposition Result | Opposition Result | Rank |
|---|---|---|---|---|---|---|---|---|---|
| Tayfun Taşdemir | Men's 3-cushion carom | Qian (CHN); W 40–17 | Sidhom (EGY); L 36–40 | — | 2 Q | Sidhom (EGY); L 21–40 | Did not advance | | |
| Gülşen Degener | Women's 3-cushion carom | Jetten (NED); W 25–10 | Klompenhouwer (NED); L 18–25 | Miyashita (JPN); L 20–25 | 3 | Did not advance | | | |

== Finswimming ==
| Athlete | Event | Time | Rank |
|---|---|---|---|
| Derin Toparlak | Men's 200 metres surface | 1:26.04 | 8 |
| Derin Toparlak | Men's 400 metres surface | 3:05.17 | 8 |

== Karate ==
| Athlete | Event | Group stage | | | | Semifinals | Final / BM | |
| Athlete | Event | Opposition Result | Opposition Result | Opposition Result | Rank | Opposition Result | Opposition Result | Rank |
|---|---|---|---|---|---|---|---|---|
| Eray Şamdan | Men's kumite 60 kg | Jina (MAR); W 3–2 | Hashimoto (JPN); W 1–0 | Crescenzo (ITA); D 0–0 | 1 Q | Shaaban (KUW); W 6–1 | Hashimoto (JPN); W 12–2 | 1st place, gold medalist(s) |
| Ömer Abdurrahim Özer | Men's kumite 67 kg | Dulović (MNE); D 0–0 | Kozaki (JPN); D 0–0 | Al-Masatfa (JOR); L 0–9 | 4 | Did not advance | | 7 |
| Tarık Koç | Men's kata | Kangwei (CHN); W 39.3-38.4 | El-Lithy (EGY); L 39.4-40.1 | Torres (USA); L 37.8-41.6 | 3 | Did not advance | | 5 |
| Tuba Yakan | Women's kumite 55 kg | Toro (CHI); W 4–2 | Terliuga (UKR); L 0–4 | — | 3 | Did not advance | | 5 |
| Fatma Naz Yenen | Women's kumite 61 kg | Mahjoub (TUN); L 0–3 | Gong Li (CHN); L 3–6 | Shimada (JPN); L 1–4 | 4 | Did not advance | | 7 |
| Eda Eltemur | Women's kumite 68 kg | Quirici (SUI); L 0–6 | Kama (JPN); L 2–6 | Sombe (FRA); L 4–5 | 4 | Did not advance | | 7 |

== Kickboxing ==
| Athlete | Event | Quarterfinal | Semifinal | Final / BM | |
| Athlete | Event | Opposition Result | Opposition Result | Opposition Result | Rank |
|---|---|---|---|---|---|
| Emin Özer | Men's K1 style 91 kg | Dochód (POL); W 2–1 | Baratov (UZB); W 3–0 | Shcherbatiuk (UKR); L 0–3 | 2nd place, silver medalist(s) |
| Feyzanur Azizoğlu | Women's K1 style 52 kg | Thủy (VIE); W 3–0 | Strnadová (CZE); L 0–3 | Ivanova (UKR); L 0–3 | 4 |
| Aybüke Kılınç | Women's point fighting 50 kg | Maswara (INA); W 12–2 | Aguilar (GUA); W 11–7 | Trovalusci (ITA); L 2–10 | 2nd place, silver medalist(s) |

== Muaythai ==
| Athlete | Event | Quarterfinal | Semifinal | Final / BM | |
| Athlete | Event | Opposition Result | Opposition Result | Opposition Result | Rank |
|---|---|---|---|---|---|
| Sibel Oruç | Women's 48 kg | Belouarrat (MAR); L 27–30 | Did not advance | | 5 |
| Kübra Kocakuş | Women's 60 kg | Ates (SWE); W 29–28 | Kamtakrapoom (THA); W 29–28 | Xin (CHN); L 28–39 | 2nd place, silver medalist(s) |
