= Karate at the 2025 World Games – Men's kumite 60 kg =

Men's kumite 60 kg at the 2025 World Games
- Venue: Jianyang Cultural and Sports Centre Gymnasium
- Location: Chengdu, China
- Dates: 8 August
- Competitors: 8 from 8 nations

Medalists
gold medal	Eray Şamdan	Turkey
silver medal	Hiromu Hashimoto	Japan
bronze medal	Christos-Stefanos Xenos	Greece

The men's kumite 60 kg competition in karate at the 2025 World Games took place on 8 August 2025 at the Jianyang Cultural and Sports Centre Gymnasium in Chengdu, China.

== Results ==
=== Pool round ===
==== Pool A ====
Pos	Athlete	B	W	D	D^{0}	L	Pts	Score	(Greece)	(Kuwait)	(Kazakhstan)	(China)
1	Christos-Stefanos Xenos (GRE)	3	3	0	0	0	9	21–13	—	5–4	10–4	6–5
2	Abdullah Shaaban (KUW)	3	2	0	0	1	6	16–9	4–5	—	9–2	3–2
3	Kaisar Alpysbay (KAZ)	3	1	0	0	2	3	7–19	4–10	2–9	—	1–0
4	Shi Leilei (CHN)	3	0	0	0	3	0	7–10	5–6	2–3	0–1	—

Source: Chengdu 2025

==== Pool B ====
Pos	Athlete	B	W	D	D^{0}	L	Pts	Score	(Turkey)	(Japan)	(Italy)	(Morocco)
1	Eray Şamdan (TUR)	3	2	0	1	0	6 (Note: Şamdan (TUR) 1–0 Hashimoto (JPN))	4–2	—	1–0	0–0	3–2
2	Hiromu Hashimoto (JPN)	3	2	0	0	1	6	12–11	0–1	—	8–7	4–3
3	Angelo Crescenzo (ITA)	3	1	0	1	1	3	9–9	0–0	7–8	—	2–1
4	Abdel Ali Jina (MAR)	3	0	0	0	3	0	6–9	2–3	3–4	1–2	—

Source: Chengdu 2025

=== Finals ===
Semi-finals
Hiromu Hashimoto (JPN)	8
Christos-Stefanos Xenos (GRE)	4
Abdullah Shaaban (KUW)	1
Eray Şamdan (TUR)	6

Gold medal bout
Hiromu Hashimoto (JPN)	2
Eray Şamdan (TUR)	12
Bronze medal bout
Christos-Stefanos Xenos (GRE)	3
Abdullah Shaaban (KUW)	3
