= 2021 World Karate Championships – Men's 60 kg =

World Karate Championship

Men's kumite 60 kg at the 2021 World Karate Championships
- Venue: Hamdan Sports Complex
- Location: Dubai, United Arab Emirates
- Dates: 17–20 November
- Competitors: 69 from 69 nations

Medalists
gold medal	Douglas Brose	Brazil
silver medal	Angelo Crescenzo	Italy
bronze medal	Abdelali Jina	Morocco
bronze medal	Iurik Ogannisian

The Men's 60 kg competition at the 2021 World Karate Championships was held from 17 to 20 November 2021.

== Results ==
=== Finals ===
Semifinals
(Brazil) Douglas Brose	3
(Morocco) Abdelali Jina	1
(France) Enzo Berthon	2
(Italy) Angelo Crescenzo	3

Final
(Brazil) Douglas Brose	3
(Italy) Angelo Crescenzo	0

=== Repechage ===
Repechage 1
(Slovenia) Niklas Tamše	0
(Kuwait) Abdullah Shaaban	1

Repechage 2
(Kuwait) Abdullah Shaaban	1
(South Korea) Gu Ju-yeong	2

Repechage 3
(South Korea) Gu Ju-yeong	2
(Kazakhstan) Kaisar Alpysbay	3

Bronze medal
(Kazakhstan) Kaisar Alpysbay	5
(Morocco) Abdelali Jina	5

Repechage 1
(Uruguay) Maximiliano Larrosa	0
(Mexico) José Luque	2

Repechage 2
(Mexico) José Luque	5
(Turkey) Eray Şamdan	3

Repechage 3
(Mexico) José Luque	0
Iurik Ogannisian	1

Bronze medal
Iurik Ogannisian	2
(France) Enzo Berthon	0

=== Top half ===
==== Section 1 ====
First round
(Spain) Fernando Delestal	4
(Nepal) Bijay Shrestha	5
(Saudi Arabia) Bader Al-Otaibi	2
(Uzbekistan) Komiljon Zokirov	3

Second round
(Nepal) Bijay Shrestha	1
(Romania) Bogdan Gogolosi	4
(Kazakhstan) Kaisar Alpysbay	3
(Sweden) Nematollah Noori	1
(Bangladesh) Md Alamin Islam	0
(Bosnia and Herzegovina) Pavle Dujaković	3
(San Marino) Michele Callini	0
(Japan) Shota Uchino	8
(Uzbekistan) Komiljon Zokirov	0
(South Korea) Gu Ju-yeong	4
(England) Mathieu Ross	2
(Singapore) Chua Sheng Da	2
(Iraq) Rahand Rashid	1
(Kuwait) Abdullah Shaaban	2
(Brazil) Douglas Brose	4
(Slovenia) Niklas Tamše	2

Third round
(Romania) Bogdan Gogolosi	1
(Kazakhstan) Kaisar Alpysbay	6
(Bosnia and Herzegovina) Pavle Dujaković	2
(Japan) Shota Uchino	3
(South Korea) Gu Ju-yeong	7
(England) Mathieu Ross	2
(Kuwait) Abdullah Shaaban	1
(Brazil) Douglas Brose	2

Fourth round
(Kazakhstan) Kaisar Alpysbay	6
(Japan) Shota Uchino	3
(South Korea) Gu Ju-yeong	0
(Brazil) Douglas Brose	2

Quarterfinals
(Kazakhstan) Kaisar Alpysbay	0
(Brazil) Douglas Brose	3

==== Section 2 ====
First round
(Azerbaijan) Aminagha Guliyev	8
(Bahrain) Bander Abdulla	0

Second round
(Azerbaijan) Aminagha Guliyev	4
(Pakistan) Murad Khan	0
(Latvia) Kalvis Kalniņš	5
(Colombia) Juan Forero	1
(North Macedonia) Fahik Veseli	3
(United States) Alex Jinesta	0
(Belgium) Michael Dasoul	0
(Egypt) Karim Abou Etta	6
(Morocco) Abdelali Jina	8
(Germany) Florian Haas	0
(Hungary) András Kiss	4
(India) Gaurav Sindhya	4
(Serbia) Miloš Radojević	5
Puris Saiyasombat	4
(South Africa) Dylan Flusk	0
(Switzerland) Luca Spitz	1

Third round
(Azerbaijan) Aminagha Guliyev	13
(Latvia) Kalvis Kalniņš	4
(North Macedonia) Fahik Veseli	1
(Egypt) Karim Abou Etta	6
(Morocco) Abdelali Jina	6
(India) Gaurav Sindhya	3
(Serbia) Miloš Radojević	0
(Switzerland) Luca Spitz	0

Fourth round
(Azerbaijan) Aminagha Guliyev	3
(Egypt) Karim Abou Etta	8
(Morocco) Abdelali Jina	4
(Serbia) Miloš Radojević	2

Quarterfinals
(Egypt) Karim Abou Etta	3
(Morocco) Abdelali Jina	4

=== Bottom half ===
==== Section 3 ====
First round
Amir Khani	6
(Jordan) Afeef Ghaith	1

Second round
Amir Khani	2
(Ukraine) Nikita Filipov	1
(France) Enzo Berthon	11
(Chile) Víctor Jara	3
(Kyrgyzstan) Rafael Akbarov	6
(Poland) Hubert Kaczmarek	1
(Cyprus) Christos Theopemtou	1
(Kosovo) Albinot Selmani	2
(Bolivia) André Quezada	6
(Algeria) Alaeddine Salmi	4
(Oman) Abdullah Al-Thani	0
(Kenya) John Thuo	3
(Hong Kong) Chau Ka Him	4
(Belarus) Oleg Melyokhin	2
(Chinese Taipei) Huang Chun-hsien	11
(Turkmenistan) Arzuw Seýtgulyýew	2

Third round
Amir Khani	1
(France) Enzo Berthon	1
(Kyrgyzstan) Rafael Akbarov	0
(Kosovo) Albinot Selmani	1
(Algeria) Alaeddine Salmi	2
(Kenya) John Thuo	0
(Hong Kong) Chau Ka Him	6
(Chinese Taipei) Huang Chun-hsien	4

Fourth round
(France) Enzo Berthon	3
(Kosovo) Albinot Selmani	2
(Algeria) Alaeddine Salmi	6
(Hong Kong) Chau Ka Him	1

Quarterfinals
(France) Enzo Berthon	4
(Algeria) Alaeddine Salmi	0

==== Section 4 ====
First round
(Israel) Ronen Gehtbarg	3
(Republic of Ireland) Conor O'Sullivan	2

Second round
(Israel) Ronen Gehtbarg	4
(Armenia) Gegham Nikoghosyan	0
(Slovakia) Dominik Imrich	2
(Bulgaria) Todor Nastev	3
(Denmark) Casper Lidegaard	1
(Malaysia) Prem Kumar Selvam	1
Iurik Ogannisian	4
(Greece) Christos-Stefanos Xenos	4
(Turkey) Eray Şamdan	7
(Ecuador) Kevin Pazmiño	5
(Georgia (country)) Aleksandre Tkvatsiria	0
(Albania) Orges Arifi	0
(Croatia) Kristijan Lacković	0
(Mexico) José Luque	0
(Uruguay) Maximiliano Larrosa	2
(Italy) Angelo Crescenzo	4

Third round
(Israel) Ronen Gehtbarg	3
(Bulgaria) Todor Nastev	3
(Malaysia) Prem Kumar Selvam	0
Iurik Ogannisian	0
(Turkey) Eray Şamdan	1
(Georgia (country)) Aleksandre Tkvatsiria	0
(Mexico) José Luque	2
(Italy) Angelo Crescenzo	3

Fourth round
(Bulgaria) Todor Nastev	2
Iurik Ogannisian	2
(Turkey) Eray Şamdan	0
(Italy) Angelo Crescenzo	0

Quarterfinals
Iurik Ogannisian	2
(Italy) Angelo Crescenzo	6
