= 2023 World Karate Championships – Men's 60 kg =

Men's kumite 60 kg at the 2023 World Karate Championships
- Venue: László Papp Budapest Sports Arena
- Location: Budapest, Hungary
- Dates: 25, 28 October
- Competitors: 74 from 74 nations

Medalists
gold medal	Christos-Stefanos Xenos	Greece
silver medal	Kaisar Alpysbay	Kazakhstan
bronze medal	Angelo Crescenzo	Italy
bronze medal	Eray Şamdan	Turkey

The men's kumite 60 kg competition at the 2023 World Karate Championships was held on 25 and 28 October 2023.

== Results ==
=== Finals ===
Semifinals
(Kazakhstan) Kaisar Alpysbay	5
(Italy) Angelo Crescenzo	1
(Greece) Christos-Stefanos Xenos	4
(Turkey) Eray Şamdan	1

Final
(Kazakhstan) Kaisar Alpysbay	1
(Greece) Christos-Stefanos Xenos	7

=== Repechage ===
Repechage 1
Reza Heidari	1
Oleg Melyokhin	7

Repechage 2
Oleg Melyokhin	7
(Senegal) Talla Razakh Ndiaye	3

Repechage 3
Oleg Melyokhin	0
(Slovakia) Dominik Imrich	1

Bronze medal
(Slovakia) Dominik Imrich	1
(Italy) Angelo Crescenzo	4

Repechage 1
(Uruguay) Maximiliano Larrosa	0
(Egypt) Amr Alaa Aboukora	5

Repechage 2
(Egypt) Amr Alaa Aboukora	3
(Algeria) Alaeddine Salmi	2

Repechage 3
(Egypt) Amr Alaa Aboukora	11
(China) Shi Leilei	3

Bronze medal
(Egypt) Amr Alaa Aboukora	1
(Turkey) Eray Şamdan	7

=== Top half ===
==== Section 1 ====
First round
(Senegal) Talla Razakh Ndiaye	3
(Canada) Yassin Miri	3
(Mexico) Raúl González	3
(Georgia (country)) David Tkebuchava	2
(Portugal) João Ribeiro	6
(Slovakia) Dominik Imrich	9

Second round
(Senegal) Talla Razakh Ndiaye	2
(Hong Kong) Chau Ka Him	1
(Chinese Taipei) Hsu Li-wei	0
(North Macedonia) Matej Belistojanoski	0
(Mexico) Raúl González	0
Oleg Melyokhin	1
Reza Heidari	1
(Kazakhstan) Kaisar Alpysbay	9
(Slovakia) Dominik Imrich	8
(Venezuela) Wilmer Pérez	1
(Israel) Ronen Gehtbarg	1
(Hungary) András László Kiss	0
(Kosovo) Albinot Selmani	2
(Netherlands) Bilal Bouzakri	7
(Japan) Yoshihito Yatoji	8
(Jordan) Abdallah Hammad	3

Third round
(Senegal) Talla Razakh Ndiaye	3
(North Macedonia) Matej Belistojanoski	0
Oleg Melyokhin	4
(Kazakhstan) Kaisar Alpysbay	5
(Slovakia) Dominik Imrich	2
(Israel) Ronen Gehtbarg	0
(Netherlands) Bilal Bouzakri	1
(Japan) Yoshihito Yatoji	1

Fourth round
(Senegal) Talla Razakh Ndiaye	0
(Kazakhstan) Kaisar Alpysbay	5
(Slovakia) Dominik Imrich	6
(Netherlands) Bilal Bouzakri	1

Quarterfinals
(Kazakhstan) Kaisar Alpysbay	5
(Slovakia) Dominik Imrich	4

==== Section 2 ====
First round
(Austria) Hamsat Israilov	1
(Indonesia) Ari Saputra	3
(Slovenia) Niklas Tamše	1
(Scotland) Adam Hamill	0

Second round
(Indonesia) Ari Saputra	1
(Spain) Álex Ortiz de Zárate	1
(Belgium) Anass Abdelmalki	9
(Philippines) John Christian Lachica	3
(Thailand) Siwakon Muekthong	4
(Serbia) Stefan Stanojević	1
(Saudi Arabia) Saud Al-Basher	0
(Brazil) Douglas Brose	1
(Slovenia) Niklas Tamše	4
(Switzerland) Eric Timmer	1
(Chad) Kesse Iye Toudja	0
(Iran) Ali Meskini	6
(Azerbaijan) Aminagha Guliyev	1
(Latvia) Deniss Kalvāns	0
(Turkmenistan) Rasul Atajanow	0
(Italy) Angelo Crescenzo	8

Third round
(Spain) Álex Ortiz de Zárate	1
(Belgium) Anass Abdelmalki	5
(Thailand) Siwakon Muekthong	1
(Brazil) Douglas Brose	3
(Slovenia) Niklas Tamše	0
(Iran) Ali Meskini	3
(Azerbaijan) Aminagha Guliyev	1
(Italy) Angelo Crescenzo	9

Fourth round
(Belgium) Anass Abdelmalki	3
(Brazil) Douglas Brose	3
(Iran) Ali Meskini	1
(Italy) Angelo Crescenzo	5

Quarterfinals
(Belgium) Anass Abdelmalki	0
(Italy) Angelo Crescenzo	2

=== Bottom half ===
==== Section 3 ====
First round
(Oman) Idris Al-Batrani	0
(Peru) Kurt García	0
(Bulgaria) Todor Nastev	2
(Denmark) Rasmus Abildgaard	1
(Uzbekistan) Sardor Ruzimurodov	1
(Algeria) Alaeddine Salmi	9

Second round
(Oman) Idris Al-Batrani	2
(China) Shi Leilei	5
(France) Sami Tas	4
(Romania) Bogdan Gogoloși	5
(Bulgaria) Todor Nastev	9
(England) Joby Wilson	1
(Poland) Bartosz Wojciechowski	0
(Morocco) Abdelali Jina	4
(Algeria) Alaeddine Salmi	4
(Ukraine) Nikita Filipov	3
(Chile) Bastián Arce	2
(Costa Rica) Reinier Palma	1
(Egypt) Amr Alaa Aboukora	6
(Albania) Orges Arifi	2
(Uruguay) Maximiliano Larrosa	0
(Greece) Christos-Stefanos Xenos	2

Third round
(China) Shi Leilei	3
(Romania) Bogdan Gogoloși	2
(Bulgaria) Todor Nastev	0
(Morocco) Abdelali Jina	2
(Algeria) Alaeddine Salmi	3
(Chile) Bastián Arce	1
(Egypt) Amr Alaa Aboukora	2
(Greece) Christos-Stefanos Xenos	3

Fourth round
(China) Shi Leilei	7
(Morocco) Abdelali Jina	6
(Algeria) Alaeddine Salmi	1
(Greece) Christos-Stefanos Xenos	3

Quarterfinals
(China) Shi Leilei	1
(Greece) Christos-Stefanos Xenos	9

==== Section 4 ====
First round
(Benin) Martial Kpadonou	2
(United States) Joseph Tolentino	3
(Kenya) John Thuo	11
(San Marino) Michele Callini	3

Second round
(United States) Joseph Tolentino	4
(Bosnia and Herzegovina) Pavle Dujaković	6
(Republic of Ireland) Hieu Power	4
(Croatia) Noa Rumenjak	6
(Czech Republic) Daniel Drábek	0
(Turkey) Eray Şamdan	6
(Sweden) Nematollah Noori	11
(Germany) Florian Haas	1
(Kenya) John Thuo	0
(Australia) Trevor Kan	2
(Montenegro) Matija Bojić	3
(Malaysia) Prem Kumar Selvam	6
(El Salvador) Pedro Recinos	2
(Colombia) Juan Forero	8
Iurik Ogannisian	2
(Kuwait) Abdullah Shaaban	4

Third round
(Bosnia and Herzegovina) Pavle Dujaković	3
(Croatia) Noa Rumenjak	3
(Turkey) Eray Şamdan	1
(Sweden) Nematollah Noori	0
(Australia) Trevor Kan	0
(Malaysia) Prem Kumar Selvam	4
(Colombia) Juan Forero	0
(Kuwait) Abdullah Shaaban	1

Fourth round
(Bosnia and Herzegovina) Pavle Dujaković	4
(Turkey) Eray Şamdan	4
(Malaysia) Prem Kumar Selvam	2
(Kuwait) Abdullah Shaaban	5

Quarterfinals
(Turkey) Eray Şamdan	0
(Kuwait) Abdullah Shaaban	0
