= Algeria at the 2022 World Games =

- IOC code: ALG
- NOC: Algerian Olympic Committee

in Birmingham, United States 7 July 2022 – 17 July 2022
- Competitors: 1 (1 man) in 1 sport and 1 event
- Medals Ranked 47th: Gold 1 Silver 0 Bronze 0 Total 1

World Games appearances
- 1981; 1985; 1989; 1993; 1997; 2001; 2005; 2009; 2013; 2017; 2022

Algeria competed at the 2022 World Games held in Birmingham, United States from 7 to 17 July 2022. One athlete represented Algeria and he won one gold medal. The country finished in 47th place in the medal table.

== Medalists ==
Medal	Name	Sport	Event	Date
Gold	Ayoub Anis Helassa	Karate	Men's kumite 60 kg	8 July

== Competitors ==
The following is the list of number of competitors in the Games.

Sport	Men	Women	Total
Karate	1	0	1
Total	1	0	1

== Karate ==
Algeria won one gold medal in karate.

Men

Athlete	Event	Elimination round				Semifinal	Final / BM	
Athlete	Event	Opposition Result	Opposition Result	Opposition Result	Rank	Opposition Result	Opposition Result	Rank
Ayoub Anis Helassa	Men's kumite 60 kg	Crescenzo (ITA); W 1–1	Assadilov (KAZ); L 2–5	Ruiz (USA); W 3–1	1 Q	Shaaban (KUW); W 2–0	Brose (BRA); W 4–0	1st place, gold medalist(s)
