= 2025 European Karate Championships – Men's 60 kg =

European Karate Championship

Men's 60 kg at the 2025 European Karate Championships
- Venue: Karen Demirchyan Sports and Concerts Complex
- Location: Yerevan, Armenia
- Dates: 8, 10 May
- Competitors: 32 from 32 nations

Medalists
gold medal	Akhmed Akhmedov
silver medal	Orges Arifi	Albania
bronze medal	Balša Vojinović	Montenegro
bronze medal	Yura Zalyan	Armenia

The Men's 60 kg competition at the 2025 European Karate Championships was held on 8 and 10 May 2025.

== Results ==
=== Finals ===
Semifinals
(Albania) Orges Arifi	5
(Bosnia and Herzegovina) Kenan Šiljak	3
Akhmed Akhmedov	5
(Kosovo) Islam Selmani	2

Final
(Albania) Orges Arifi	1
Akhmed Akhmedov	2

=== Repechage ===
Repechage 1
(Montenegro) Balša Vojinović	9
(Czech Republic) Martin Drábek	9

Repechage 2
(Montenegro) Balša Vojinović	4
(Spain) Urko Primicia	2

Bronze medal
(Montenegro) Balša Vojinović	2
(Bosnia and Herzegovina) Kenan Šiljak	1

Repechage 1
(Denmark) Mads Christensen	2
(Armenia) Yura Zalyan	2

Repechage 2
(Armenia) Yura Zalyan	1
Maksim Kashyrski	1

Bronze medal
(Armenia) Yura Zalyan	5
(Kosovo) Islam Selmani	3

=== Top half ===
==== Section 1 ====
Round of 32
(Switzerland) Eric Timmer	2
(France) Ahmed El Amine Hellal	3
(San Marino) Michele Callini	1
(Spain) Urko Primicia	9
(Israel) Mark Filshchynskyi	3
(Czech Republic) Martin Drábek	3
(Montenegro) Balša Vojinović	1
(Albania) Orges Arifi	2

Round of 16
(Switzerland) Eric Timmer	4
(Spain) Urko Primicia	7
(Czech Republic) Martin Drábek	2
(Albania) Orges Arifi	4

Quarterfinals
(Spain) Urko Primicia	0
(Albania) Orges Arifi	1

==== Section 2 ====
Round of 32
(Bulgaria) Velin Ivanov	3
(Norway) Petter Kristensen	2
(Ukraine) Nikita Filipov	1
(Bosnia and Herzegovina) Kenan Šiljak	3
(North Macedonia) Fahik Veseli	3
(Sweden) Nematollah Noori	2
(Slovakia) Dominik Imrich	1
(Turkey) Eray Şamdan	0

Round of 16
(Bulgaria) Velin Ivanov	0
(Bosnia and Herzegovina) Kenan Šiljak	3
(North Macedonia) Fahik Veseli	2
(Slovakia) Dominik Imrich	1

Quarterfinals
(Bosnia and Herzegovina) Kenan Šiljak	6
(North Macedonia) Fahik Veseli	4

=== Bottom half ===
==== Section 3 ====
Round of 32
Akhmed Akhmedov	8
(Denmark) Mads Christensen	0
(Armenia) Yura Zalyan	3
(Croatia) Nino Donadić	1
(Poland) Bartosz Wojciechowski	1
Maksim Kashyrski	3
(Serbia) Marko Đurđić	2
(Italy) Angelo Crescenzo	3

Round of 16
Akhmed Akhmedov	9
(Armenia) Yura Zalyan	0
Maksim Kashyrski	1
(Italy) Angelo Crescenzo	1

Quarterfinals
Akhmed Akhmedov	9
Maksim Kashyrski	0

==== Section 4 ====
Round of 32
(Kosovo) Islam Selmani	4
(Scotland) Adam Hamill	2
(Romania) Mario Petre	5
(Georgia (country)) Tsotne Sordia	3
(Cyprus) Andreas Gavriel	5
(Belgium) Anass Abdelmalki	2
(Germany) Florian Haas	3
(Greece) Christos-Stefanos Xenos	7

Round of 16
(Kosovo) Islam Selmani	9
(Romania) Mario Petre	1
(Cyprus) Andreas Gavriel	0
(Greece) Christos-Stefanos Xenos	5

Quarterfinals
(Kosovo) Islam Selmani	7
(Greece) Christos-Stefanos Xenos	7
