= 2024 European Karate Championships – Men's 60 kg =

European Karate Championship

Men's 60 kg at the 2024 European Karate Championships
- Venue: Krešimir Ćosić Hall
- Location: Zadar, Croatia
- Dates: 9, 11 May
- Competitors: 33 from 33 nations

Medalists
| gold medal | Christos-Stefanos Xenos | Greece |
| silver medal | Orges Arifi | Albania |
| bronze medal | Ahmed El Amine Hellal | France |
| bronze medal | Eray Şamdan | Turkey |

The Men's 60 kg competition at the 2024 European Karate Championships was held on 9 and 11 May 2024.

== Results ==
=== Finals ===
Semifinals
(Azerbaijan) Farid Savadov | 1
(Albania) Orges Arifi | 1
(Belgium) Anass Abdelmalik | 3
(Greece) Christos-Stefanos Xenos | 9

Final
(Albania) Orges Arifi | 1
(Greece) Christos-Stefanos Xenos | 3

=== Repechage ===
Repechage 1
(Scotland) Adam Hamill | 3
(Sweden) Nematollah Noori | 2

Repechage 2
(Scotland) Adam Hamill | 3
(France) Ahmed El Amine Hellal | 4

Bronze medal
(France) Ahmed El Amine Hellal | 8
(Belgium) Anass Abdelmalik | 5

Repechage 1
(Switzerland) Eric Timmer | 2
(Turkey) Eray Şamdan | 3

Repechage 2
(Turkey) Eray Şamdan | 2
(Czech Republic) Martin Drábek | 2

Bronze medal
(Turkey) Eray Şamdan | 1
(Azerbaijan) Farid Savadov | 1

=== Top half ===
==== Section 1 ====
Round of 64
(Serbia) Stefan Stanojević | 8
(Cyprus) Andreas Gavriel | 5

Round of 32
(Serbia) Stefan Stanojević | 8
(Bulgaria) Velin Ivanov | 0
(Azerbaijan) Farid Savadov | 3
(Ukraine) Nikita Filipov | 1
(Bosnia and Herzegovina) Pavle Dujaković | 7
(Slovakia) Dominik Imrich | 2
(Portugal) João Ribeiro | 8
(Italy) Angelo Crescenzo | 5

Round of 16
(Serbia) Stefan Stanojević | 4
(Azerbaijan) Farid Savadov | 5
(Bosnia and Herzegovina) Pavle Dujaković | 5
(Portugal) João Ribeiro | 1

Quarterfinals
(Azerbaijan) Farid Savadov | 2
(Bosnia and Herzegovina) Pavle Dujaković | 0

==== Section 2 ====
Round of 64

Round of 32
(Czech Republic) Martin Drábek | 8
(Spain) Hugo Álvarez | 3
(Georgia (country)) David Tkebuchava | 2
(North Macedonia) Nedim Shaqiri | 2
(Switzerland) Eric Timmer | 2
(Albania) Orges Arifi | 3
(Montenegro) Ognjen Bjelajac | 0
(Turkey) Eray Şamdan | 9

Round of 16
(Czech Republic) Martin Drábek | 4
(North Macedonia) Nedim Shaqiri | 2
(Albania) Orges Arifi | 4
(Turkey) Eray Şamdan | 2

Quarterfinals
(Czech Republic) Martin Drábek | 2
(Albania) Orges Arifi | 3

=== Bottom half ===
==== Section 3 ====
Round of 64
(Poland) Bartek Wojciechowski | 9
(Croatia) Bruno Jelinić | 5

Round of 32
(Poland) Bartek Wojciechowski | 1
(Germany) Florian Haas | 0
(Belgium) Anass Abdelmalik | 4
(Kosovo) Islam Selmani | 2
(Hungary) András Kiss | 2
(Norway) Benjamin Helbak Lunde | 0
(Israel) Ronen Gehtbarg | 4
(Romania) Bogdan Gogoloși | 1

Round of 16
(Germany) Florian Haas | 2
(Belgium) Anass Abdelmalik | 8
(Hungary) András Kiss | 3
(Israel) Ronen Gehtbarg | 0

Quarterfinals
(Belgium) Anass Abdelmalik | 7
(Hungary) András Kiss | 2

==== Section 4 ====
Round of 64

Round of 32
Oleg Melyokhin | 0
(France) Ahmed El Amine Hellal | 0
(Denmark) Rasmus Abildgaard | 0
(Latvia) Deniss Kalvans | 0
(San Marino) Michele Callini | 4
(Sweden) Nematollah Noori | 5
(Scotland) Adam Hamill | 2
(Greece) Christos-Stefanos Xenos | 3

Round of 16
(France) Ahmed El Amine Hellal | 3
(Denmark) Rasmus Abildgaard | 1
(Sweden) Nematollah Noori | 0
(Greece) Christos-Stefanos Xenos | 3

Quarterfinals
(France) Ahmed El Amine Hellal | 1
(Greece) Christos-Stefanos Xenos | 5
