= Karate at the 2019 European Games – Men's kumite 60 kg =

Men's kumite 60 kg at the 2019 European Games
- Venue: Čyžoŭka-Arena
- Date: 30 June
- Competitors: 8 from 8 nations

Medalists
gold medal	Kalvis Kalniņš	Latvia
silver medal	Firdovsi Farzaliyev	Azerbaijan
bronze medal	Angelo Crescenzo	Italy
bronze medal	Evgeny Plakhutin	Russia

The men's kumite 60 kg competition at the 2019 European Games in Minsk was held on 30 June 2019 at the Čyžoŭka-Arena.

== Schedule ==
All times are local (UTC+3).

Date	Time	Event
Sunday, 30 June 2019	10:30	Elimination round
Sunday, 30 June 2019	15:48	Semifinals
Sunday, 30 June 2019	17:16	Final

== Results ==
=== Elimination round ===
==== Group A ====
Rank	Athlete	B	W	D	L	Pts	Score
1	Kalvis Kalniņš (LAT)	3	3	0	0	6	6–4
2	Evgeny Plakhutin (RUS)	3	2	0	1	4	10–2
3	Eray Şamdan (TUR)	3	1	0	2	2	6–11
4	Bogdan Gogoloşi (ROU)	3	0	0	3	0	3–8

	Score	
Evgeny Plakhutin (RUS)	0–1	Kalvis Kalniņš (LAT)
Eray Şamdan (TUR)	2–2	Bogdan Gogoloşi (ROU)
Eray Şamdan (TUR)	3–4	Kalvis Kalniņš (LAT)
Evgeny Plakhutin (RUS)	5–0	Bogdan Gogoloşi (ROU)
Bogdan Gogoloşi (ROU)	1–1	Kalvis Kalniņš (LAT)
Evgeny Plakhutin (RUS)	5–1	Eray Şamdan (TUR)

==== Group B ====
Rank	Athlete	B	W	D	L	Pts	Score
1	Firdovsi Farzaliyev (AZE)	3	2	1	0	5	11–3
2	Angelo Crescenzo (ITA)	3	1	2	0	4	8–0
3	Emil Pavlov (MKD)	3	1	1	1	3	8–3
4	Ilya Bulatau (BLR)	3	0	0	3	0	0–21

	Score	
Angelo Crescenzo (ITA)	0–0	Emil Pavlov (MKD)
Firdovsi Farzaliyev (AZE)	8–0	Ilya Bulatau (BLR)
Firdovsi Farzaliyev (AZE)	3–3	Emil Pavlov (MKD)
Angelo Crescenzo (ITA)	8–0	Ilya Bulatau (BLR)
Ilya Bulatau (BLR)	0–5	Emil Pavlov (MKD)
Angelo Crescenzo (ITA)	0–0	Firdovsi Farzaliyev (AZE)

=== Finals ===
Semifinals
Kalvis Kalniņš (LAT)	3
Angelo Crescenzo (ITA)	1
Firdovsi Farzaliyev (AZE)	0
Evgeny Plakhutin (RUS)	0

Final
Kalvis Kalniņš (LAT)	4
Firdovsi Farzaliyev (AZE)	0
