= Karate at the 2022 Asian Games – Men's kumite 60 kg =

Men's kumite 60 kg at the 2022 Asian Games
- Venue: Linping Sports Centre Gymnasium
- Date: 6 October 2023
- Competitors: 19 from 19 nations

Medalists
gold medal	Kaisar Alpysbay	Kazakhstan
silver medal	Abdullah Shaaban	Kuwait
bronze medal	Abdallah Hammad	Jordan
bronze medal	Siwakon Muekthong	Thailand

The men's kumite 60 kilograms competition at the 2022 Asian Games took place on 6 October 2023 at Linping Sports Centre Gymnasium, Hangzhou.

== Schedule ==
All times are China Standard Time (UTC+08:00)

Date	Time	Event
Friday, 6 October 2023	08:30	Round of 32
Friday, 6 October 2023	08:30	Round of 16
Friday, 6 October 2023	08:30	Quarterfinals
Friday, 6 October 2023	08:30	Semifinals
Friday, 6 October 2023	08:30	Repechages
Friday, 6 October 2023	14:30	Finals

== Results ==
=== Main bracket ===
==== Final ====
Gold medal contest
Abdullah Shaaban (KUW)	5
Kaisar Alpysbay (KAZ)	7

==== Top half ====
Round of 32
Arzuw Seýitgulyýew (TKM)	1
Saud Al-Basher (KSA)	9

Round of 16
Chu Văn Đức (VIE)	0
Saud Al-Basher (KSA)	6
Abdullah Shaaban (KUW)	1
Ulugbek Aliboev (UZB)	0
Hamayun (PAK)	2
Júlio da Silva (TLS)	0
Abdallah Hammad (JOR)	2
Rafael Akbarov (KGZ)	0

Quarterfinals
Saud Al-Basher (KSA)	1
Abdullah Shaaban (KUW)	6
Hamayun (PAK)	2
Abdallah Hammad (JOR)	8

Semifinals
Abdullah Shaaban (KUW)	7
Abdallah Hammad (JOR)	0

==== Bottom half ====
Round of 32
Kaisar Alpysbay (KAZ)	5
Chau Ka Him (HKG)	4
Ly Kouy Hav (CAM)	0
Ari Saputra (INA)	8

Round of 16
Sureeya Sankar (MAS)	3
Kaisar Alpysbay (KAZ)	5
Siwakon Muekthong (THA)	8
Tshering Phuntsho (BHU)	0
Harith Dahlan (BRU)	1
John Christian Lachica (PHI)	3
Ari Saputra (INA)	6
Al Amin Islam (BAN)	0

Quarterfinals
Kaisar Alpysbay (KAZ)	8
Siwakon Muekthong (THA)	0
John Christian Lachica (PHI)	1
Ari Saputra (INA)	4

Semifinals
Kaisar Alpysbay (KAZ)	12
Ari Saputra (INA)	3

=== Repechage ===
Repechage round 1
Chau Ka Him (HKG)	5
Sureeya Sankar (MAS)	5

Repechage round 2
Ulugbek Aliboev (UZB)	3
Saud Al-Basher (KSA)	6
Sureeya Sankar (MAS)	5
Siwakon Muekthong (THA)	7

Bronze medal bouts
Saud Al-Basher (KSA)	2
Abdallah Hammad (JOR)	5
Siwakon Muekthong (THA)	7
Ari Saputra (INA)	6
