= 2026 European Karate Championships – Men's 60 kg =

Men's 60 kg at the 2026 European Karate Championships
- Venue: Eissporthalle Frankfurt
- Location: Frankfurt, Germany
- Dates: 21, 23 May
- Competitors: 28 from 28 nations

Medalists
gold medal	Christos-Stefanos Xenos	Greece
silver medal	Aleksandar Vučković	Serbia
bronze medal	Balša Vojinović	Montenegro
bronze medal	Tsotne Sordia	Georgia

The men's 60 kg competition at the 2026 European Karate Championships was held on 21 and 23 May 2026.

== Results ==
=== Finals ===
Semifinals
Akhmed Akhmedov	2
(Serbia) Aleksandar Vučković	1
(Georgia (country)) Tsotne Sordia	1
(Greece) Christos-Stefanos Xenos	2

Final
(Serbia) Aleksandar Vučković	0
(Greece) Christos-Stefanos Xenos	7

=== Repechage ===
Repechage 1
(Cyprus) Andreas Gavriel	1
(Azerbaijan) Aslan Dostuyev	8

Repechage 2
(Azerbaijan) Aslan Dostuyev	2
(Montenegro) Balša Vojinović	7

Bronze medal
(Montenegro) Balša Vojinović	w/o
Akhmed Akhmedov	DSQ

Repechage 1
(North Macedonia) Nedim Shaqiri	4
(Spain) Unai Chica	1

Bronze medal
(North Macedonia) Nedim Shaqiri	1
(Georgia (country)) Tsotne Sordia	9

=== Top half ===
==== Section 1 ====
Round of 32
(Scotland) Adam Hamill	2
(Poland) Bartosz Wojciechowski	0
(Armenia) Avetik Ghazaryan	2
(Denmark) Mads Christensen	1
(Croatia) Lovro Maslov	1
(Italy) Christian Sabatino	6

Round of 16
(Scotland) Adam Hamill	4
(Armenia) Avetik Ghazaryan	2
(Italy) Christian Sabatino	0
Akhmed Akhmedov	4

Quarterfinals
(Scotland) Adam Hamill	0
Akhmed Akhmedov	5

==== Section 2 ====
Round of 32
(Albania) Orges Arifi	2
(Azerbaijan) Aslan Dostuyev	4
(Serbia) Aleksandar Vučković	3
(Cyprus) Andreas Gavriel	2
(Montenegro) Balša Vojinović	2
(Sweden) Nematollah Noori	0

Round of 16
(Azerbaijan) Aslan Dostuyev	3
(Serbia) Aleksandar Vučković	4
(Montenegro) Balša Vojinović	5
(Turkey) Nuri Kılıç	6

Quarterfinals
(Serbia) Aleksandar Vučković	3
(Montenegro) Balša Vojinović	1

=== Bottom half ===
==== Section 3 ====
Round of 32
(France) Sami Tas	3
(Ukraine) Mykyta Filipov	7
(Switzerland) Eric Timmer	5
(Germany) Florian Haas	3
(Bulgaria) Nikolay Stefanov	3
(Belgium) Anass Abdelmalki	1

Round of 16
(Ukraine) Mykyta Filipov	2
(Switzerland) Eric Timmer	4
(Bulgaria) Nikolay Stefanov	0
(Georgia (country)) Tsotne Sordia	1

Quarterfinals
(Switzerland) Eric Timmer	0
(Georgia (country)) Tsotne Sordia	0

==== Section 4 ====
Round of 32
(Romania) Erhan Tornaci	5
(Hungary) Máté Nagy	0
(Kosovo) Islam Selmani	1
(Spain) Unai Chica	7
(North Macedonia) Nedim Shaqiri	7
(Bosnia and Herzegovina) Seldin Vejo	6

Round of 16
(Romania) Erhan Tornaci	6
(Spain) Unai Chica	9
(North Macedonia) Nedim Shaqiri	1
(Greece) Christos-Stefanos Xenos	1

Quarterfinals
(Spain) Unai Chica	2
(Greece) Christos-Stefanos Xenos	4
