= 2022 European Karate Championships – Men's 60 kg =

European Karate Championship

Men's 60 kg at the 2022 European Karate Championships
- Venue: Karataş Şahinbey Sport Hall
- Location: Gaziantep, Turkey
- Dates: 26–28 May
- Competitors: 32 from 32 nations

Medalists
| gold medal | Eray Şamdan | Turkey |
| silver medal | Angelo Crescenzo | Italy |
| bronze medal | Ronen Gehtbarg | Israel |
| bronze medal | Christos-Stefanos Xenos | Greece |

The Men's 60 kg competition at the 2022 European Karate Championships was held from 26 to 28 May 2022.

== Results ==
=== Finals ===
Semifinals
(Israel) Ronen Gehtbarg | 3
(Italy) Angelo Crescenzo | 1
(Greece) Christos-Stefanos Xenos | 2
(Turkey) Eray Şamdan | 6

Final
(Italy) Angelo Crescenzo | 0
(Turkey) Eray Şamdan | 1

=== Repechage ===
Repechage 1
(Switzerland) Kjetil Waber | 0
(Slovakia) Dominik Imrich | 8

Repechage 2
(Slovakia) Dominik Imrich | 8
(Croatia) Noa Rumenjak | 0

Bronze medal
(Slovakia) Dominik Imrich | 0
(Israel) Ronen Gehtbarg | 6

Repechage 1
(Germany) Florian Haas | 1
(North Macedonia) Fahik Veseli | 1

Repechage 2
(Germany) Florian Haas | 4
(Kosovo) Albinot Selmani | 3

Bronze medal
(Germany) Florian Haas | 2
(Greece) Christos-Stefanos Xenos | 10

=== Top half ===
==== Section 1 ====
Round of 32
(Israel) Ronen Gehtbarg | 5
(Spain) Urko Primicia | 3
(Azerbaijan) Aminagha Guliyev | 3
(Poland) Bartosz Wojciechowski | 0
(Georgia (country)) David Tkebuchava | 3
(France) Rayan Meziane | 2
(Belgium) Anass Abdelmalki | 3
(Slovenia) Niklas Tamše | 2

Round of 16
(Israel) Ronen Gehtbarg | 1
(Azerbaijan) Aminagha Guliyev | 0
(Georgia (country)) David Tkebuchava | 2
(Belgium) Anass Abdelmalki | 1

Quarterfinals
(Israel) Ronen Gehtbarg | 1
(Georgia (country)) David Tkebuchava | 0

==== Section 2 ====
Round of 32
(England) Ethan Day | 2
(Croatia) Noa Rumenjak | 4
(Cyprus) Christos Theopemptou | 4
(Republic of Ireland) Conor O'Sullivan | 0
(Montenegro) Matija Bojić | 1
(Slovakia) Dominik Imrich | 2
(Italy) Angelo Crescenzo | 4
(Switzerland) Kjetil Waber | 0

Round of 16
(Croatia) Noa Rumenjak | 5
(Cyprus) Christos Theopemptou | 1
(Slovakia) Dominik Imrich | 2
(Italy) Angelo Crescenzo | 4

Quarterfinals
(Croatia) Noa Rumenjak | 1
(Italy) Angelo Crescenzo | 5

=== Bottom half ===
==== Section 3 ====
Round of 32
(Albania) Orges Arifi | 3
(Bulgaria) Todor Nastev | 1
(Armenia) Gegham Nikoghosyan | 1
(Portugal) José Xavier | 3
(Czech Republic) Daniel Drábek | 8
(Austria) Hamsat Israilov | 4
(Bosnia and Herzegovina) Pavle Dujaković | 0
(Greece) Christos-Stefanos Xenos | 3

Round of 16
(Albania) Orges Arifi | 3
(Portugal) José Xavier | 0
(Czech Republic) Daniel Drábek | 0
(Greece) Christos-Stefanos Xenos | 3

Quarterfinals
(Albania) Orges Arifi | 0
(Greece) Christos-Stefanos Xenos | 2

==== Section 4 ====
Round of 32
(Hungary) András Kiss | 0
(Romania) Vlad Pamfil | 4
(Ukraine) Nikita Filippov | 0
(Kosovo) Albinot Selmani | 3
(Sweden) Alireza Hosseini | 0
(North Macedonia) Fahik Veseli | 4
(Germany) Florian Haas | 0
(Turkey) Eray Şamdan | 5

Round of 16
(Romania) Vlad Pamfil | 0
(Kosovo) Albinot Selmani | 3
(North Macedonia) Fahik Veseli | 0
(Turkey) Eray Şamdan | 1

Quarterfinals
(Kosovo) Albinot Selmani | 0
(Turkey) Eray Şamdan | 5
