= 2023 European Karate Championships – Men's 60 kg =

European Karate Championship

Men's 60 kg at the 2023 European Karate Championships
- Venue: Palacio Multiusos de Guadalajara
- Location: Guadalajara, Spain
- Dates: 23, 25 March
- Competitors: 35 from 35 nations

Medalists
gold medal	Angelo Crescenzo	Italy
silver medal	Christos-Stefanos Xenos	Greece
bronze medal	Eray Şamdan	Turkey
bronze medal	Florian Haas	Germany

The Men's 60 kg competition at the 2023 European Karate Championships was held on 23 and 25 March 2023.

== Results ==
=== Finals ===
Semifinals
(Turkey) Eray Şamdan	0
(Greece) Christos-Stefanos Xenos	3
(Germany) Florian Haas	0
(Italy) Angelo Crescenzo	0

Final
(Greece) Christos-Stefanos Xenos	4
(Italy) Angelo Crescenzo	5

=== Repechage ===
Repechage 1
(Israel) Ronen Gehtbarg	2
(Bulgaria) Todor Nastev	1

Repechage 2
(Israel) Ronen Gehtbarg	2
(Ukraine) Nikita Filipov	1

Bronze medal
(Israel) Ronen Gehtbarg	0
(Turkey) Eray Şamdan	8

Repechage 1
(Georgia (country)) David Tkebuchava	1
(England) Ethan Day	2

Repechage 2
(England) Ethan Day	2
(Portugal) João Ribeiro	5

Bronze medal
(Portugal) João Ribeiro	5
(Germany) Florian Haas	7

=== Top half ===
==== Section 1 ====
Round of 64
(Montenegro) Matija Bojić	4
(Croatia) Noa Rumenjak	10

Round of 32
(Croatia) Noa Rumenjak	0
(Spain) Álex Ortiz	9
(San Marino) Michele Callini	0
(France) Ahmed El Amine Hellal	8
(Romania) Vlad Pamfil	1
(Denmark) Mads Christensen	5
(Netherlands) Bilal Bouzakri	0
(Turkey) Eray Şamdan	2

Round of 16
(Spain) Álex Ortiz	4
(France) Ahmed El Amine Hellal	1
(Denmark) Mads Christensen	0
(Turkey) Eray Şamdan	1

Quarterfinals
(Spain) Álex Ortiz	2
(Turkey) Eray Şamdan	4

==== Section 2 ====
Round of 64
(Republic of Ireland) David Gahan	2
(Sweden) Nematollah Noori	1

Round of 32
(Republic of Ireland) David Gahan	0
(Bosnia and Herzegovina) Pavle Dujaković	3
(Slovenia) Sven Rakovnik	0
(Ukraine) Nikita Filipov	1
(Bulgaria) Todor Nastev	6
(Hungary) Bence Csöppű	0
(Israel) Ronen Gehtbarg	3
(Greece) Christos-Stefanos Xenos	5

Round of 16
(Bosnia and Herzegovina) Pavle Dujaković	1
(Ukraine) Nikita Filipov	2
(Bulgaria) Todor Nastev	0
(Greece) Christos-Stefanos Xenos	2

Quarterfinals
(Ukraine) Nikita Filipov	3
(Greece) Christos-Stefanos Xenos	3

=== Bottom half ===
==== Section 3 ====
Round of 64
(Cyprus) Christos Theopemptou	1
(Switzerland) Eric Timmer	0

Round of 32
(Cyprus) Christos Theopemptou	0
(Slovakia) Dominik Imrich	5
(Scotland) Adam Hamill	1
(Germany) Florian Haas	3
(Albania) Orges Arifi	1
Reza Heidara	4
(Armenia) Gegham Nikogjosyan	1
(Azerbaijan) Aminagha Guliyev	1

Round of 16
(Slovakia) Dominik Imrich	0
(Germany) Florian Haas	1
Reza Heidara	0
(Azerbaijan) Aminagha Guliyev	0

Quarterfinals
(Germany) Florian Haas	4
(Azerbaijan) Aminagha Guliyev	3

==== Section 4 ====
Round of 64

Round of 32
(Poland) Arkadiusz Kwaśniewski	1
(Portugal) João Ribeiro	2
(Czech Republic) Martin Drábek	0
(Belgium) Michael Dasoul	0
(England) Ethan Day	2
(North Macedonia) Fahik Veseli	0
(Georgia (country)) David Tkebuchava	0
(Italy) Angelo Crescenzo	4

Round of 16
(Portugal) João Ribeiro	3
(Belgium) Michael Dasoul	2
(England) Ethan Day	0
(Italy) Angelo Crescenzo	4

Quarterfinals
(Portugal) João Ribeiro	0
(Italy) Angelo Crescenzo	5
