= Kuwait at the 2022 World Games =

- IOC code: KUW
- NOC: Kuwait Olympic Committee

in Birmingham, United States 7 July 2022 – 17 July 2022
- Competitors: 4 (4 men) in 3 sports
- Medals: Gold 0 Silver 0 Bronze 0 Total 0

World Games appearances
- 1981; 1985; 1989; 1993; 1997; 2001; 2005; 2009; 2013; 2017; 2022; 2025

Kuwait competed at the 2022 World Games in Birmingham, Alabama, United States from 7 July to 17 July 2022.

== Competitors ==
Four athletes from Kuwait qualified for the Games.

| Sport | Men | Women | Total |
|---|---|---|---|
| Bowling | 2 | 0 | 2 |
| Cue sports | 1 | 0 | 1 |
| Karate | 1 | 0 | 1 |
| Total | 4 | 0 | 4 |

== Bowling ==
Two athletes from Kuwait competed in bowling.

| Athlete | Event | Round of 32 | Round of 16 | Quarterfinal | Semifinal | Final / BM | |
| Athlete | Event | Opposition Result | Opposition Result | Opposition Result | Opposition Result | Opposition Result | Rank |
|---|---|---|---|---|---|---|---|
| Mostafa Almousawi | Men's singles | Polizzotto (ITA); L 200–201, 185–193 | did not advance | | | | |
| Hassan Qassem | Men's singles | Kim (KOR); L 150–235, 161–209 | did not advance | | | | |
| Mostafa Almousawi; Hassan Qassem | Men's doubles | —N/a | Sewchuran/Ju (RSA); W 204–146, 149–237, 179–168 | Fach/Alexander (CAN); L 182–186, 169–176 | did not advance | | |

== Cue sports ==
Omar Al-Shaheen competed in the nine-ball men's singles tournament.

| Athlete | Event | Round of 16 | Quarterfinal | Semifinal | Final / BM | |
| Athlete | Event | Opposition Result | Opposition Result | Opposition Result | Opposition Result | Rank |
|---|---|---|---|---|---|---|
| Omar Al-Shaheen | Nine-ball men's singles | Pehlivanović (BIH); L DNF–11 | did not advance | | | |

== Karate ==
Abdullah Shaaban competed in the men's kumite 60 kg event. He qualified for the bracket, coming in second place in his pool, then lost in the semi-finals to Algerian karateka Ayoub Anis Helassa.
