= Karate at the 2023 European Games – Men's kumite 60 kg =

Men's kumite 60 kg at the 2023 European Games
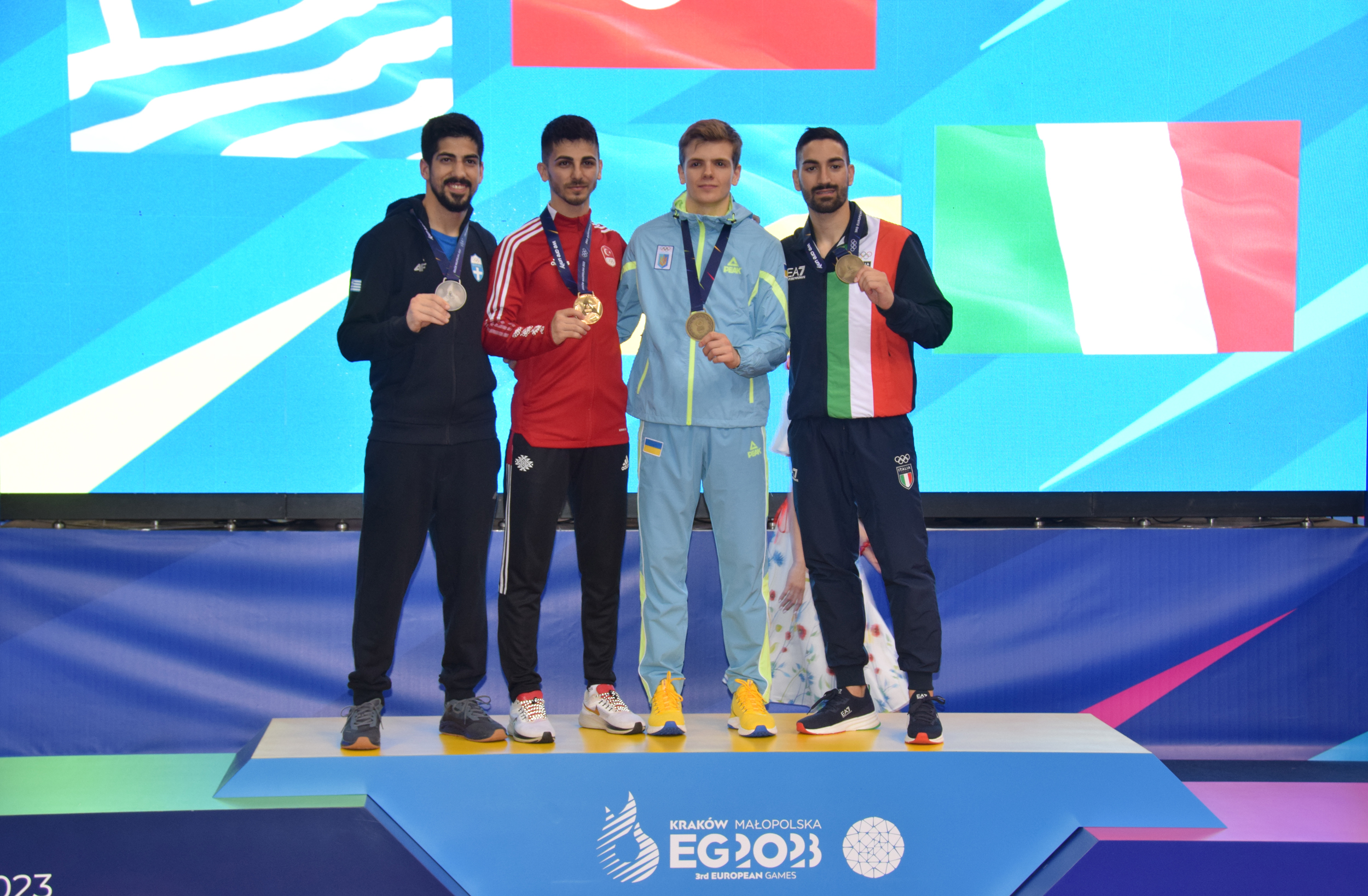
- Venue: Bielsko-Biała Arena
- Date: 22 June
- Competitors: 8 from 8 nations

Medalists
gold medal	Eray Şamdan	Turkey
silver medal	Christos-Stefanos Xenos	Greece
bronze medal	Angelo Crescenzo	Italy
bronze medal	Nikita Filipov	Ukraine

The men's kumite 60 kg competition at the 2023 European Games was held on 22 June 2023 at the Bielsko-Biała Arena.

== Results ==
=== Elimination round ===
Pool A

Pos	Athlete	B	W	D	D^{0}	L	Pts	Score	(Turkey)	(Greece)	(Azerbaijan)	(Poland)
1	Eray Şamdan (TUR)	3	3	0	0	0	9	10–1	—	2–1	7–0	1–0
2	Christos-Stefanos Xenos (GRE)	3	2	0	0	1	6	12–4	1–2	—	2–1	9–1
3	Aminagha Guliyev (AZE)	3	1	0	0	2	3	2–9	0–7	1–2	—	1–0
4	Arkadiusz Kwaśniewski (POL)	3	0	0	0	3	0	1–11	0–1	1–9	0–1	—

Source: EG2023

Pool B

Pos	Athlete	B	W	D	D^{0}	L	Pts	Score	(Ukraine)	(Italy)	(Israel)	(Germany)
1	Nikita Filipov (UKR)	3	2	0	1	0	6	3–1	—	2–1	1–0	0–0
2	Angelo Crescenzo (ITA)	3	1	0	1	1	3	2–3	1–2	—	0–0	2–0
3	Ronen Gehtbarg (ISR)	3	0	1	1	1	1 (Note: Gehtbarg (ISR) 2–2 Haas (GER). Tied on scores obtained (2). Scores got against: Gehtbarg 3, Haas 4.)	2–3	0–1	0–0	—	2–2
4	Florian Haas (GER)	3	0	1	1	1	1	2–4	0–0	0–2	2–2	—

Source: EG2023

=== Finals ===
Semifinals
Angelo Crescenzo (ITA)	0
Eray Şamdan (TUR)	0
Christos-Stefanos Xenos (GRE)	1
Nikita Filipov (UKR)	0

Gold medal bout
Eray Şamdan (TUR)	2
Christos-Stefanos Xenos (GRE)	2
