= Karate at the 2022 World Games – Men's kumite 60 kg =

Men's kumite 60 kg at the 2022 World Games
- Venue: Bill Battle Coliseum
- Location: Birmingham, United States
- Dates: 8 July
- Competitors: 8 from 8 nations

Medalists
gold medal	Ayoub Anis Helassa	Algeria
silver medal	Douglas Brose	Brazil
bronze medal	Angelo Crescenzo	Italy

The men's kumite 60 kg competition in karate at the 2022 World Games took place on 8 July 2022 at the Bill Battle Coliseum in Birmingham, United States.

== Results ==
=== Elimination round ===
==== Pool A ====
Pos	Athlete	B	W	D	L	Pts	Score	(Algeria)	(Italy)	(Kazakhstan)	(United States)
1	Ayoub Anis Helassa (ALG)	3	2	0	1	4	6–7	—	1–1	2–5	3–1
2	Angelo Crescenzo (ITA)	3	1	1	1	3	6–2	1–1	—	0–0	5–1
3	Darkhan Assadilov (KAZ)	3	1	1	1	3	5–5	5–2	0–0	—	0–3
4	Frank Ruiz (USA)	3	1	0	2	2	5–8	1–3	1–5	3–0	—

Source: Birmingham 2022

==== Pool B ====
Pos	Athlete	B	W	D	L	Pts	Score	(Brazil)	(Kuwait)	(Morocco)	(Latvia)
1	Douglas Brose (BRA)	3	2	1	0	5	8–0	—	0–0	6–0	2–0
2	Abdullah Shaaban (KUW)	3	2	1	0	5	7–2	0–0	—	2–0	5–2
3	Abdelali Jina (MAR)	3	1	0	2	2	5–11	0–6	0–2	—	5–3
4	Kalvis Kalniņš (LAT)	3	0	0	3	0	5–12	0–2	2–5	3–5	—

Source: Birmingham 2022

=== Finals ===
Semi-finals
Ayoub Anis Helassa (ALG)	2
Abdullah Shaaban (KUW)	0
Douglas Brose (BRA)	4
Angelo Crescenzo (ITA)	2

Gold medal bout
Ayoub Anis Helassa (ALG)	4
Douglas Brose (BRA)	0
Bronze medal bout
Abdullah Shaaban (KUW)	1
Angelo Crescenzo (ITA)	1
