= 2026 European Karate Championships – Men's 67 kg =

Men's 67 kg at the 2026 European Karate Championships
- Venue: Eissporthalle Frankfurt
- Location: Frankfurt, Germany
- Dates: 21, 23 May
- Competitors: 38 from 38 nations

Medalists
gold medal	Luca Maresca	Italy
silver medal	Younesse Salmi	France
bronze medal	Georgios Baliotis	Greece
bronze medal	Iurik Ogannisian

The men's 67 kg competition at the 2026 European Karate Championships was held on 21 and 23 May 2026.

== Results ==
=== Finals ===
Semifinals
(Italy) Luca Maresca	7
(Greece) Georgios Baliotis	5
(France) Younesse Salmi	6
Iurik Ogannisian	3

Final
(Italy) Luca Maresca	6
(France) Younesse Salmi	4

=== Repechage ===
Repechage 1
(Bulgaria) Denis Aprilov	0
(Moldova) Alexandr Capmoale	5

Repechage 2
(Moldova) Alexandr Capmoale	9
(Azerbaijan) Farid Hajizada	0

Bronze medal
(Moldova) Alexandr Capmoale	0
(Greece) Georgios Baliotis	4

Repechage 1
(Denmark) Mathias Bech Linaa	5
(Portugal) Joaquim Mendes	3

Repechage 2
(Denmark) Mathias Bech Linaa	1
(Turkey) Ömer Abdurrahim Özer	1

Bronze medal
(Turkey) Ömer Abdurrahim Özer	2
Iurik Ogannisian	4

=== Top half ===
==== Section 1 ====
Round of 64
(Spain) Álex Ortiz de Zárate	3
(Latvia) Artur Stepanov	6
(Moldova) Alexandr Capmoale	2
(Montenegro) Nenad Dulović	0

Round of 32
(Latvia) Artur Stepanov	3
(North Macedonia) Matej Belistojanoski	4
(Azerbaijan) Farid Hajizada	8
(Sweden) Taha Bechtioui	2
(Moldova) Alexandr Capmoale	5
(Romania) Orlando Baicu	1
(Bulgaria) Denis Aprilov	0
(Italy) Luca Maresca	8

Round of 16
(North Macedonia) Matej Belistojanoski	4
(Azerbaijan) Farid Hajizada	5
(Moldova) Alexandr Capmoale	3
(Italy) Luca Maresca	6

Quarterfinals
(Azerbaijan) Farid Hajizada	6
(Italy) Luca Maresca	8

==== Section 2 ====
Round of 64
Oleg Melyokhin	11
(Cyprus) Markos Tsangaras	4

Round of 32
Oleg Melyokhin	0
(Luxembourg) Yanis Tamim	2
(Republic of Ireland) Conor O'Sullivan	0
(Scotland) Joe Gallagher	2
(Estonia) Tan Markus Ojala	1
(Serbia) Stefan Joksić	2
(Croatia) Boran Berak	0
(Greece) Georgios Baliotis	4

Round of 16
(Luxembourg) Yanis Tamim	2
(Scotland) Joe Gallagher	5
(Serbia) Stefan Joksić	0
(Greece) Georgios Baliotis	4

Quarterfinals
(Scotland) Joe Gallagher	3
(Greece) Georgios Baliotis	5

=== Bottom half ===
==== Section 3 ====
Round of 64
(Georgia (country)) Nika Tolordava	4
(Bosnia and Herzegovina) Kenan Šiljak	4
(Albania) Rigers Rami	0
(Ukraine) Nazarii Prannychuk	2

Round of 32
(Bosnia and Herzegovina) Kenan Šiljak	1
(Portugal) Joaquim Mendes	5
(Denmark) Mathias Bech Linaa	0
(France) Younesse Salmi	7
(Ukraine) Nazarii Prannychuk	4
(England) Jed Thompson	1
(Turkey) Ömer Abdurrahim Özer	4
(Germany) Muhammed Özdemir	0

Round of 16
(Portugal) Joaquim Mendes	0
(France) Younesse Salmi	3
(Ukraine) Nazarii Prannychuk	0
(Turkey) Ömer Abdurrahim Özer	6

Quarterfinals
(France) Younesse Salmi	9
(Turkey) Ömer Abdurrahim Özer	4

==== Section 4 ====
Round of 64
(Israel) Ronen Gehtbarg	3
(Switzerland) Steven Torres	0

Round of 32
(Israel) Ronen Gehtbarg	0
(Poland) Dominik Dziuda	1
(Kosovo) Muje Krasniqi	1
(Iceland) Samuel Josh Ramos	4
(Armenia) Yura Zalyan	7
(Netherlands) Samy Achghouyab	0
(Hungary) Zsombor Tóth	3
Iurik Ogannisian	8

Round of 16
(Poland) Dominik Dziuda	8
(Iceland) Samuel Josh Ramos	0
(Armenia) Yura Zalyan	0
Iurik Ogannisian	1

Quarterfinals
(Poland) Dominik Dziuda	2
Iurik Ogannisian	2
