= Samet Agdeve =

Turkish kickboxer (born 2004)

Samet Ağdeve
- Born: 12 February 2004 (age 22); Kars, Turkey
- Other names: The King; Samed Ağdeve
- Height: 1.90 m (6 ft 3 in)
- Weight: 109 kg (240 lb; 17.2 st)
- Division: Heavyweight
- Style: Kickboxing
- Stance: Orthodox
- Fighting out of: İzmir, Turkey
- Team: Tiger Sport Academy
- Years active: 2022–present

Kickboxing record
- Total: 19
- Wins: 18
- By knockout: 12
- Losses: 1
- By knockout: 0
- Draws: 0
- No contests: 0

Samet Ağdeve (born 12 February 2004) is a Turkish kickboxer. He is a former Heavyweight Kickboxing World Champion.

== Amateur career ==
In 2021 Agdeve won the WAKO Junior European Championship in the Kick Light category.

Ağdeve represented Turkey at the 2022 WAKO Junior World Championship in Jesolo, Italy. He finished first in -89 kg class in the Kick Light discipline.

== Professional career ==
=== Early years ===
Ağdeve made his SENSHI debut at SENSHI 27 against Giannis Stoforidis. In the first round his opponent got a cut on his shin. Agdeve was declared winner after the doctor concluded his Stoforidis wasn't able to continue.

On September 13, 2025 Ağdeve took part in a Grand Prix tournament at SENSHI 28. He defeated against Ali Badawi with a first round knock out in quarterfinals. In the semifinal he knocked out Gerrardo Atti. In the final he beat Rhys Brudenell to crown himself the inaugural SENSHI Grand Prix champion. He also received the KO of the Night award.

=== ONE Championship ===
On September 19, 2025 it was announced that Ağdeve signed with ONE Championship.

Agdeve was scheduled to fight ONE Championship's reigning Muay Thai Heavyweight and Kickboxing Light Heavyweight champion Roman Kryklia for the inaugural ONE Heavyweight Kickboxing World Championship at ONE Fight Night 37 on November 7, 2025. He won the fight via unanimous decision.

== Titles and accomplishments ==
- ONE Championship
  - 2025 ONE Heavyweight Kickboxing World Championship (One time, former)
  - First ONE Championship champion from Turkey
- SENSHI
  - 2025 Senshi Heavyweight Grand Prix Winner
  - Senshi 28 KO of the Night
- World Association of Kickboxing Organizations
  - 2023 Turkish Open WAKO World Cup K-1 +91 kg (gold)
  - 2022 WAKO Junior World Championship Kick Light -89 kg (gold)
  - 2021 WAKO Junior European Championship Kick Light -84 kg (gold)

== Kickboxing record ==
18 Wins (11 (T)KO's), 1 Loss
Date	Result	Opponent	Event	Location	Method	Round	Time
2026-06-19	Loss	(Ukraine) Roman Kryklia	ONE Friday Fights 159	Bangkok, Thailand	Decision (Unanimous)	5	3:00
Loses the ONE Heavyweight Kickboxing World Championship.
2025-11-08	Win	(Ukraine) Roman Kryklia	ONE Fight Night 37	Bangkok, Thailand	Decision (Unanimous)	5	3:00
Wins the inaugural ONE Heavyweight Kickboxing World Championship.
2025-09-13	Win	(United Kingdom) Rhys Brudenell	SENSHI 28 - Grand Prix, Final	Varna, Bulgaria	Decision (Unanimous)	3	3:00
Wins the 2025 SENSHI Heavyweight Grand Prix.
2025-09-13	Win	(Togo) Gerardo Atti	SENSHI 28 - Grand Prix, Semifinals	Varna, Bulgaria	KO (Right Hook)	3	
2025-09-13	Win	(Switzerland) Ali Badawi	SENSHI 28 - Grand Prix, Quarterfinals	Varna, Bulgaria	KO (Right Overhand)	1	
2025-07-12	Win	(Greece) Giannis Stoforidis	SENSHI 27	Varna, Bulgaria	TKO (Doctor Stoppage)	1	
2025-05-17	Win	(Belgium) Tahir Della	Mix Fight Championship 52	Frankfurt, Germany	KO (Left hook)	1	1:06
2024-12-14	Win	(Egypt) Ahmad Radwan	Enfusion 145	Wuppertal, Germany	TKO (Punches)	2	
2024-05-18	Win	(Germany) Deniz Kirbach	Enfusion Rookies	Wuppertal, Germany	TKO	3	
2023-10-21	Win	(Turkey) Hasan Erīpek	Umut Fight Arena 6	İzmir, Turkey	Decision (Unanimous)	3	3:00
2023-06-29	Win	(Iran) Hamidreza Kordabadi	Umut Fight Arena 5	İzmir, Turkey	Decision (unanimous)	3	3:00
2022-12-07	Win	(Turkey) Ferit Karadagli	Umut Fight Arena 4	İzmir, Turkey	TKO	2	2:33
2022-10-28	Win	(Turkey) Muammer Can Sahin	Alray Ring Sporlari Organizasyonu	İzmit, Turkey	Decision (Unanimous)	3	3:00
2022-10-15	Win	(Iran) Alireza Sadeghi	Umut Fight Arena 3	İzmir, Turkey	KO (High kick and Punches)	1	2:50
2022-07-29	Win	(Syria) Ömer Elhaj	NFC Fight Club	Aksaray, Turkey	TKO (Doctor Stoppage)	2	3:00
2022-06-21	Win	(Turkey) Emin Özer	Army of Fighters 3	Istanbul, Turkey	Decision (Unanimous)	3	3:00
2022-03-31	Win	(Iran) Tahmores Shabanzade	NFC Fight Club	Aksaray, Turkey	KO (Punches)	1	2:50
2022-03-20	Win	(Turkey) Emin Özer	Golden Boys Fight Club	İzmir, Turkey	Decision (Unanimous)	3	3:00
Legend: Win Loss Draw/No contest Notes

Date	Result	Opponent	Event	Location	Method	Round	Time
2023-05-18	Win	(Turkey) Veysel Sahin	8th Turkish Open WAKO World Cup 2023	Istanbul, Turkey			
Wins WAKO 8th Turkish Open WAKO 2023 K-1 +91kg Gold Medal.
Legend: Win Loss Draw/No contest Notes
