= Muaythai at the 2025 World Games – Women's 60 kg =

World Games muaythai event

Women's 60 kg at the 2025 World Games
- Muaythai pictogram
- Venue: Sichuan Provincial Gymnasium
- Dates: 8–10 August 2025
- Competitors: 8 from 8 nations

Medalists
1st place, gold medalist(s)		Han Xin	China
2nd place, silver medalist(s)		Kübra Kocakuş	Turkey
3rd place, bronze medalist(s)		Kaewrudee Kamtakrapoom	Thailand

The women's 60 kg muaythai (Note: Muaythai is the official name of Muay Thai, recognized by International World Games Association and International Olympic Committee.) event at the 2025 World Games will be held from 8 to 10 August 2025 at the Sichuan Provincial Gymnasium. 8 Muay Thai practitioners from 8 nations participated in the event.

== Competition schedule ==
All times are in local time (UTC+8), according to the official schedule.

Date	Time	Event
8 August 2025	19:00	Quarterfinals
9 August 2025	20:00	Semifinals
10 August 2025	19:00	Bronze medal match
10 August 2025	20:30	Gold medal match

== Results ==
=== Legend ===
- RET — Won by Retirement
- RSC-H — Won by Referee Stopping Contest - Hard Head Blows
- WO — Won by Walkover

=== Bracket ===
Quarterfinals
Kübra Kocakuş (TUR)	29
Ewin Anna Ates (SWE)	28
Kaewrudee Kamtakrapoom (THA)	29
Astrid Johanna Grents (EST)	28
Ajsa Adel Sandorfi (HUN)	18
Han Xin (CHN)	20
Marina Bespalova (AIN)	30
Adriana Płachta (POL)	27

Semifinals
Kübra Kocakuş (TUR)	29
Kaewrudee Kamtakrapoom (THA)	28
Han Xin (CHN)	30
Marina Bespalova (AIN)	27

Gold medal bout
Kübra Kocakuş (TUR)	28
Han Xin (CHN)	29
Bronze medal bout
Kaewrudee Kamtakrapoom (THA)	29
Marina Bespalova (AIN)	28
