= Karate at the 2022 Mediterranean Games – Men's 60 kg =

Men's kumite 60 kg at the 2022 Mediterranean Games
- Venue: Mohammed ben Ahmed CCO Hall 03 and 06
- Date: 26 June
- Competitors: 12 from 12 nations

Medalists
gold medal	Eray Şamdan	Turkey
silver medal	Ala Salmi	Algeria
bronze medal	Amr Aboukora	Egypt
bronze medal	Rayyan Meziane	France

The men's 60 kg competition in karate at the 2022 Mediterranean Games was held on 26 June at the Mohammed ben Ahmed CCO Hall 03 and 06 in Oran.

== Results ==
=== Bracket ===
Round of 16
Christos Theopemtou (CYP)	0
Amr Aboukora (EGY)	0
Eray Şamdan (TUR)	0
Mohamed Rfigui (TUN)	0
Abdelali Jina (MAR)	5
Álex Ortiz (ESP)	2
Ala Salmi (ALG)	8
Niklas Tamše Marinić (SLO)	0

Quarterfinals
Amr Aboukora (EGY)	5
Christos-Stefanos Xenos (GRE)	0
Eray Şamdan (TUR)	8
Pavle Dujaković (BIH)	0
Abdelali Jina (MAR)	3
Angelo Crescenzo (ITA)	4
Ala Salmi (ALG)	2
Rayyan Meziane (FRA)	1

Semifinals
Amr Aboukora (EGY)	1
Eray Şamdan (TUR)	5
Angelo Crescenzo (ITA)	1
Ala Salmi (ALG)	2

Final
Eray Şamdan (TUR)	5
Ala Salmi (ALG)	0

=== Repechage ===
Repechage
Mohamed Rfigui (TUN)	1
Pavle Dujaković (BIH)	2

Bronze medal
Pavle Dujaković (BIH)	4
Amr Aboukora (EGY)	8

Repechage
Niklas Tamše Marinić (SLO)	0
Rayyan Meziane (FRA)	1

Bronze medal
Rayyan Meziane (FRA)	2
Angelo Crescenzo (ITA)	0
