= 2025 European Karate Championships – Men's 67 kg =

European Karate Championship

Men's 67 kg at the 2025 European Karate Championships
- Venue: Karen Demirchyan Sports and Concerts Complex
- Location: Yerevan, Armenia
- Dates: 8, 10 May
- Competitors: 36 from 36 nations

Medalists
gold medal	Ömer Abdurrahim Özer	Turkey
silver medal	Iurik Ogannisian
bronze medal	Nenad Dulović	Montenegro
bronze medal	Muhammed Özdemir	Germany

The Men's 67 kg competition at the 2025 European Karate Championships was held on 8 and 10 May 2025.

== Results ==
=== Finals ===
Semifinals
(Montenegro) Nenad Dulović	3
(Turkey) Ömer Abdurrahim Özer	5
(Germany) Muhammed Özdemir	1
Iurik Ogannisian	2

Final
(Turkey) Ömer Abdurrahim Özer	2
Iurik Ogannisian	1

=== Repechage ===
Repechage 1
(Spain) Alex Ortiz de Zarate	1
(Latvia) Artur Stepanov	5

Repechage 2
(Latvia) Artur Stepanov	6
(Moldova) Alexandr Capmoale	7

Bronze medal
(Moldova) Alexandr Capmoale	0
(Montenegro) Nenad Dulović	7

Repechage 1
(Poland) Dominik Dziuda	5
(Serbia) Mihajlo Krnajac	1

Repechage 2
(Poland) Dominik Dziuda	2
(France) Younesse Salmi	6

Bronze medal
(France) Younesse Salmi	7
(Germany) Muhammed Özdemir	8

=== Top half ===
==== Section 1 ====
Round of 64
(Croatia) Boran Berak	4
(North Macedonia) Matej Belistojanoski	4

Round of 32
(North Macedonia) Matej Belistojanoski	10
Oleg Melyokhin	1
(Albania) Abdullah Backa	0
(Belgium) Youness Oualad	10
(Portugal) Joaquim Mendes	2
(Montenegro) Nenad Dulović	4
(Republic of Ireland) Connor O'Sullivan	2
(Italy) Luca Maresca	3

Round of 16
(North Macedonia) Matej Belistojanoski	3
(Belgium) Youness Oualad	0
(Montenegro) Nenad Dulović	3
(Italy) Luca Maresca	1

Quarterfinals
(Belgium) Youness Oualad	0
(Montenegro) Nenad Dulović	4

==== Section 2 ====
Round of 64
(Cyprus) Marcos Tsangaras	0
(Israel) Ronen Gehtbarg	5

Round of 32
(Israel) Ronen Gehtbarg	3
(Moldova) Alexandr Capmoale	6
(Estonia) Tan Markus Ojala	2
(Slovakia) Martin Čiaky	6
(Latvia) Artur Stepanov	4
(Kosovo) Shpresim Shabani	2
(Spain) Alex Ortiz de Zarate	0
(Turkey) Ömer Abdurrahim Özer	3

Round of 16
(Moldova) Alexandr Capmoale	9
(Slovakia) Martin Čiaky	1
(Latvia) Artur Stepanov	0
(Turkey) Ömer Abdurrahim Özer	3

Quarterfinals
(Moldova) Alexandr Capmoale	2
(Turkey) Ömer Abdurrahim Özer	7

=== Bottom half ===
==== Section 3 ====
Round of 64
(Hungary) Dávid Enrique Nichols-izaguirre	3
(England) Joby Wilson	3

Round of 32
(Hungary) Dávid Enrique Nichols-izaguirre	1
(Romania) Baicu Orlando	0
(Luxembourg) Jordan Sibille	2
(Bulgaria) Teodor Todorov	5
Amir Reza Mirzaei	6
(Ukraine) Davyd Yanovskyi	0
(Georgia (country)) Anzor Donadze	0
(Germany) Muhammed Özdemir	4

Round of 16
(Romania) Baicu Orlando	2
(Bulgaria) Teodor Todorov	5
Amir Reza Mirzaei	2
(Germany) Muhammed Özdemir	2

Quarterfinals
(Bulgaria) Teodor Todorov	0
(Germany) Muhammed Özdemir	1

==== Section 4 ====
Round of 64
(Serbia) Mihajlo Krnajac	1
(Denmark) Mathias Bech Linaa	0

Round of 32
(Serbia) Mihajlo Krnajac	1
(Bosnia and Herzegovina) Bekir Grabus	0
Iurik Ogannisian	5
(Poland) Dominik Dziuda	0
(Scotland) Dylan Rush	1
(Armenia) Suren Harutyunyan	8
(France) Younesse Salmi	6
(Greece) Georgios Baliotis	2

Round of 16
(Serbia) Mihajlo Krnajac	0
Iurik Ogannisian	8
(Armenia) Suren Harutyunyan	0
(France) Younesse Salmi	4

Quarterfinals
Iurik Ogannisian	5
(France) Younesse Salmi	0
