= Kalvis Kalniņš =

Latvian karateka (born 1991)

Personal information
- Born: 16 February 1991 (age 35)

Sport
- Country: Latvia
- Sport: Karate
- Weight class: 60 kg
- Event: Kumite
Medal record
Men's karate
Representing Latvia
European Games
| Gold medal – first place | 2019 Minsk | Kumite 60 kg |
World Championships
| Bronze medal – third place | 2010 Belgrade | Kumite 60 kg |
European Championships
| Gold medal – first place | 2017 İzmit | Kumite 60 kg |
| Silver medal – second place | 2012 Adeje | Kumite 60 kg |
| Silver medal – second place | 2021 Poreč | Kumite 60 kg |
| Bronze medal – third place | 2013 Budapest | Kumite 60 kg |
| Bronze medal – third place | 2018 Novi Sad | Kumite 60 kg |

Kalvis Kalniņš (born 16 February 1991) is a karateka from Latvia. He is a five-time medalist at the European Karate Championships; he won one gold medal, two silver medals and two bronze medals there. He also won one of the bronze medals in the men's kumite 60 kg event at the 2010 World Karate Championships held in Belgrade, Serbia.

Kalniņš represented Latvia at the 2020 Summer Olympics in Tokyo. He competed in the men's 67 kg event and did not advance to compete in the semifinals.

== Career ==
Kalniņš won one of the bronze medals in the men's kumite 60 kg event at the 2010 World Karate Championships held in Belgrade. In 2019, Kalniņš won the gold medal in the men's kumite 60 kg event at the European Games held in Minsk, Belarus.

In May 2021, Kalniņš won the silver medal in his event at the European Karate Championships in Poreč, Croatia. In June 2021, he competed at the World Olympic Qualification Tournament held in Paris hoping to qualify for the 2020 Summer Olympics in Tokyo. Kalniņš did not qualify at the tournament, as he was eliminated in his first match, but he was able to qualify soon afterwards via continental representation.

He competed in the men's kumite 60 kg event at the 2022 World Games held in Birmingham, Alabama. He finished in fourth place in his pool and did not advance to compete in the semi-finals.

== Achievements ==
| Year | Competition | Venue | Rank | Event |
|---|---|---|---|---|
| 2010 | World Championships | Belgrade, Serbia | 3rd | Kumite 60 kg |
| 2012 | European Championships | Adeje, Spain | 2nd | Kumite 60 kg |
| 2013 | European Championships | Budapest, Hungary | 3rd | Kumite 60 kg |
| 2017 | European Championships | İzmit, Turkey | 1st | Kumite 60 kg |
| 2018 | European Championships | Novi Sad, Serbia | 3rd | Kumite 60 kg |
| 2019 | European Games | Minsk, Belarus | 1st | Kumite 60 kg |
| 2021 | European Championships | Poreč, Croatia | 2nd | Kumite 60 kg |
