= Emin Özer =

Turkish kickboxer (born 2004)

- Born: 1 November 2004 (age 21); İzmir, Turkey
- Division: K-1 +91 kg
- Style: Kickboxing
- Team: Turkey national team
- Last updated on: 17 August 2025

Emin Özer (born 1 November 2004) is a Turkish kickboxer competing in the men’s K-1 +91 kg division. He is a two-time silver medalist at major international competitions, winning at both the World Games and the European Championships.

== Career ==
Özer hails from İzmir, Turkey, where he started kickboxing at a young age despite limited facilities. Together with two other young athletes from İzmir, he overcame difficulties in training and eventually earned a place in the national team.

He first gained attention in junior competitions. At the 2021 WAKO European Kickboxing Championships in Budva, Montenegro, Turkish youth athletes, including Özer, collected 44 medals overall.

In 2022, he competed at the World Junior Kickboxing Championships in Jesolo, Italy, where the Turkish youth team achieved 49 medals.

At the 2024 WAKO European Championships in Athens, Greece, Özer advanced to the final in the men’s K-1 +91 kg category, ultimately winning the silver medal.

In 2025, he represented Turkey at the World Games in Chengdu, China. He defeated Uzbekistan’s Khusankhon Khusanov in the semifinal to secure a place in the final. In the final, Özer faced Roman Shcherbatiuk of Ukraine and won the silver medal after a 3–0 decision.

=== Professional ===
Özer made his professional debut at Golden Boys Fight Club, on March 20, 2022, against Samet Agdeve. He lost the bout via decision. He rematched Agdeve three months later, at Army of Fighters, on June 21, 2022. He again lost via decision.

Özer would return at Umut Fight Arena 6, on October 21, 2023. He faced Ufuk Karaüzümcü, winning via decision.

Following a three year absence from Professional fights, during which he focused on his amateur career, Özer made his Glory Kickboxing debut at Glory 105, on February 7, 2026. He faced Mohammed Hamdi, losing via unanimous decision.

== Kickboxing record ==
Kickboxing record
2 Wins (1 (T)KO's), 4 Losses, 0 Draw
Date	Result	Opponent	Event	Location	Method	Round	Time
2026-09-26	Loss	(Turkey) İzzet Tatarbolat	Loca Fight Club	Istanbul, Turkey	TKO	1	2:11
2026-09-05		(Tunisia) Sharif ben Mabrouk	SENSHI 33 - Light Heavyweight Grand Prix, Quarterfinals	Varna, Bulgaria	Decision (unanimous)	3	3:00
2026-02-07	Loss	(Morocco) Mohammed Hamdi	Glory 105	Arnhem, Netherlands	Decision (unanimous)	3	3:00
2023-10-21	Loss	(Turkey) Ufuk Karaüzümcü	Umut Fight Arena 6	İzmir, Turkey	Decision	3	3:00
2022-06-21	Loss	(Turkey) Samet Agdeve	Army of Fighters	Istanbul, Turkey	Decision	3	3:00
2022-03-20	Loss	(Turkey) Samet Agdeve	Golden Boys Fight Club	İzmir, Turkey	Decision	3	3:00
Legend: Win Loss Draw/No contest Notes

Amateur kickboxing record
Date	Result	Opponent	Event	Location	Method	Round	Time
2025-08-13	Loss	(Ukraine) Roman Shcherbatiuk	2025 World Games - K-1 Tournament, Final	Chengdu, China	Decision (3:0)	3	2:00
Wins 2025 World Games K-1 91 kg Gold Medal.
2025-08-13	Win	(Uzbekistan) Khusankhon Baratov	2025 World Games - K-1 Tournament, Semifinals	Chengdu, China	Decision (3:0)	3	2:00
2025-08-12	Win	(Poland) Robert Dochod	2025 World Games - K-1 Tournament, Quarterfinals	Chengdu, China	Decision (3:0)	3	2:00
2024-11-08	Loss	(Ukraine) Roman Shcherbatiuk	2024 WAKO European Championships, Final	Athens, Greece	Decision (3:0)	3	2:00
Wins the 2024 WAKO European Championship K-1 Super Heavyweight (+91 kg) Gold Medal.
2024-11-07	Win	(France) Abdarhmane Coulibaly	2024 WAKO European Championships, Semifinals	Athens, Greece	Decision (2:1)	3	2:00
2024-11-06	Win	(Greece) Ilir Bega	2024 WAKO European Championships, Quarterfinals	Athens, Greece	Decision	3	2:00
2024-05-19	Loss	(Uzbekistan) Khusankhon Baratov	2024 Turkish Open - K-1 Tournament, Final	Büyükçekmece, Turkey	Decision (3:0)	3	2:00
2024-05-19	Win	(Turkey) Ibrahim Turkoglu	2024 Turkish Open - K-1 Tournament, Semifinals	Büyükçekmece, Turkey	Decision	3	2:00
2024-05-19	Win	(Turkey) Irmak Dokuzoglu Cagan	2024 Turkish Open - K-1 Tournament, Quarterfinals	Büyükçekmece, Turkey	Decision (3:0)	3	2:00
2023-06-18	Win	(Turkey) Turan Sahin Veysel	2024 Turkish Open - K-1 Tournament, Octofinals	Büyükçekmece, Turkey	Decision (3:0)	3	2:00
Legend: Win Loss Draw/No contest Notes
