= Kaisar Alpysbay =

Kazakhstani karateka (born 1995)

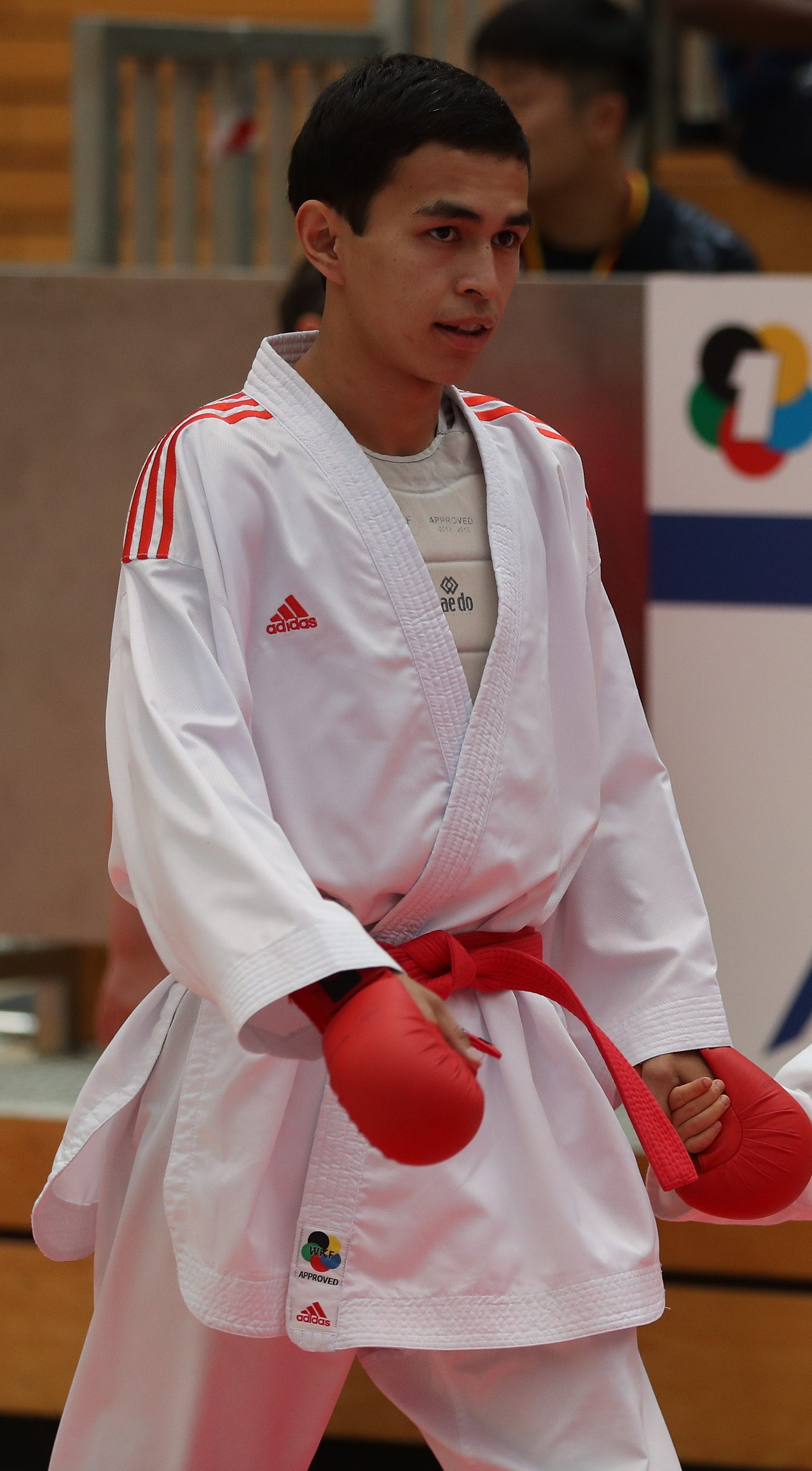
- Alpysbay in 2018

Personal information
- Born: 11 December 1995 (age 30)

Sport
- Country: Kazakhstan
- Sport: Karate
- Weight class: 60 kg
- Event: Kumite
Medal record
Men's karate
Representing Kazakhstan
World Championships
| Silver medal – second place | 2023 Budapest | Kumite 60 kg |
Asian Games
| Gold medal – first place | 2022 Hangzhou | Kumite 60 kg |
Islamic Solidarity Games
| Gold medal – first place | 2021 Konya | Kumite 60 kg |
Asian Karate Championships
| Gold medal – first place | 2023 Malacca | Kumite 60 kg |

Kaisar Alpysbay (Қайсар Күмісбекұлы Алпысбай, born 11 December 1995) is a Kazakhstani karateka. He won the silver medal in the men's kumite 60 kg event at the 2023 World Karate Championships held in Budapest, Hungary. He also won the gold medal in his event at the 2022 Asian Games held in Hangzhou, China and the 2021 Islamic Solidarity Games held in Konya, Turkey.

== Career ==
In 2021, Alpysbay lost his bronze medal match in the men's 60 kg event at the 2021 World Karate Championships held in Dubai, United Arab Emirates. In 2022, Alpysbay won the gold medal in the men's 60 kg event at the 2021 Islamic Solidarity Games held in Konya, Turkey.

Alpysbay won the gold medal in the men's 60 kg event at the 2023 Asian Karate Championships held in Malacca, Malaysia. He also won the gold medal in his event at the 2022 Asian Games held in Hangzhou, China. He defeated Abdullah Shaaban of Kuwait in his gold medal match. In the same month, he won the silver medal in the men's kumite 60 kg event at the 2023 World Karate Championships held in Budapest, Hungary. In the final, he lost against Christos-Stefanos Xenos of Greece.

== Achievements ==
| Year | Competition | Venue | Rank | Event |
|---|---|---|---|---|
| 2022 | Islamic Solidarity Games | Konya, Turkey | 1st | Kumite 60 kg |
| 2023 | Asian Championships | Malacca, Malaysia | 1st | Kumite 60 kg |
| 2023 | Asian Games | Hangzhou, China | 1st | Kumite 60 kg |
| 2023 | World Championships | Budapest, Hungary | 2nd | Kumite 60 kg |
