= Iurik Ogannisian =

Russian karateka (born 2002)

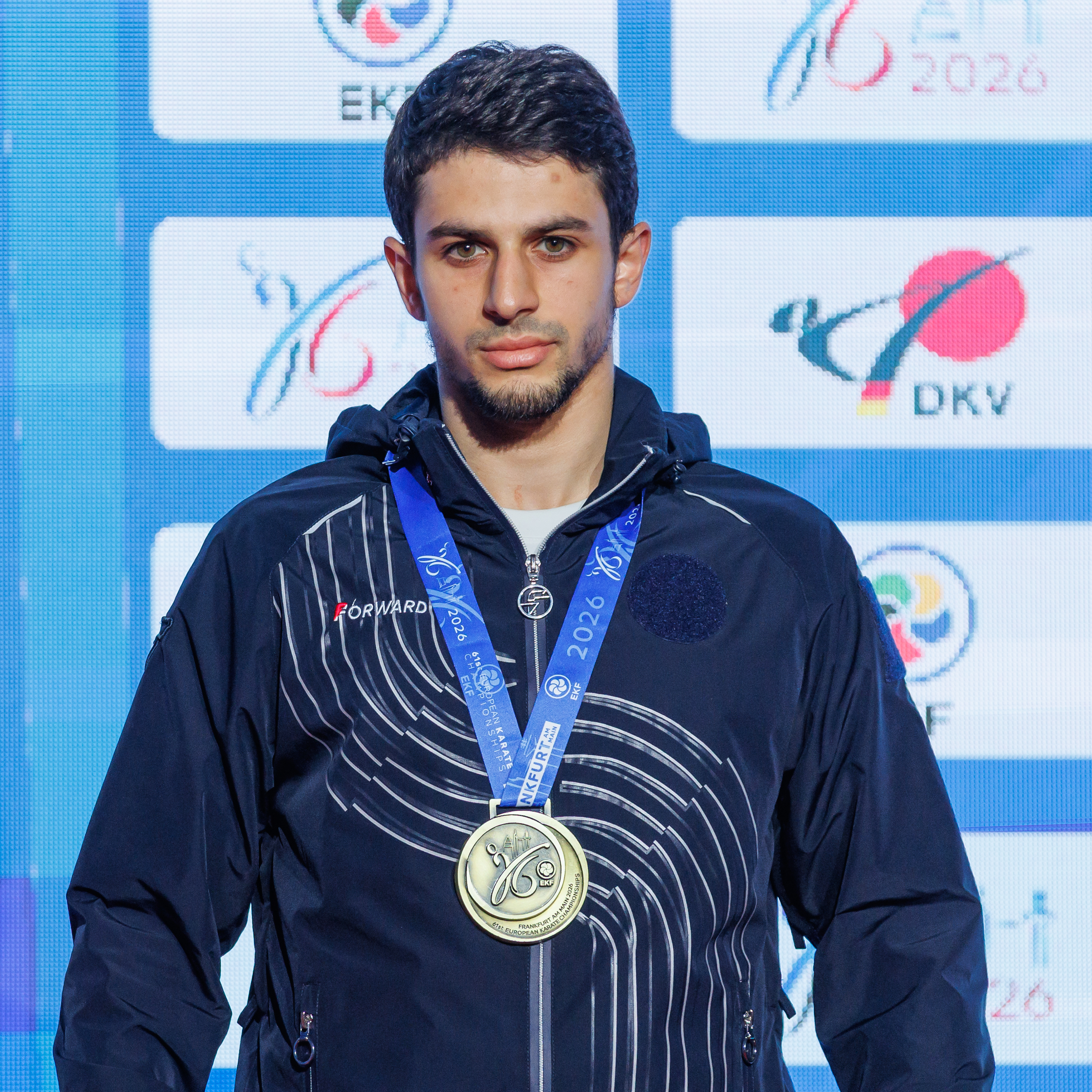

Personal information
- Born: 5 August 2002 (age 23)

Sport
- Country: Russia
- Sport: Karate
- Weight class: 60 kg
- Event: Kumite
Medal record
Men's karate
Representing European Karate Federation
European Championships
Silver medal – second place	2025 Yerevan	67 kg
Bronze medal – third place	2026 Frankfurt	67 kg
Bronze medal – third place	2026 Frankfurt	Team kumite
Representing Russian Karate Federation
World Championships
Bronze medal – third place	2021 Dubai	60 kg
Representing Russia
European Championships
Bronze medal – third place	2021 Poreč	60 kg

Iurik Norayrovich Ogannisian (Russian: Юрик Норайрович Оганнисян; born 5 August 2002) is a Russian karateka. He won one of the bronze medals in the men's 60 kg event at the 2021 World Karate Championships held in Dubai, United Arab Emirates.

In May 2021, he won one of the bronze medals in his event at the 2021 European Karate Championships held in Poreč, Croatia. In October 2021, he also won one of the bronze medals in his event at the Karate1 Premier League competition held in Moscow, Russia.
