= Kuwait at the 2025 World Games =

- IOC code: KUW
- NOC: Kuwait Olympic Committee

in Chengdu, China 7 August 2025 – 17 August 2025
- Competitors: 3 (3 men and 0 women) in 2 sports and 2 events
- Medals: Gold 0 Silver 0 Bronze 0 Total 0

World Games appearances
- 1981; 1985; 1989; 1993; 1997; 2001; 2005; 2009; 2013; 2017; 2022; 2025

Kuwait will compete at the 2025 World Games held in Chengdu, China from 7 to 17 August 2025.

== Competitors ==
The following is the list of number of competitors in the Games.

Sport	Men	Women	Total
Karate	1	0	1
Powerboating	2	0	2
Total	3	0	3
