= Christos-Stefanos Xenos =

Greek karateka (born 2000)

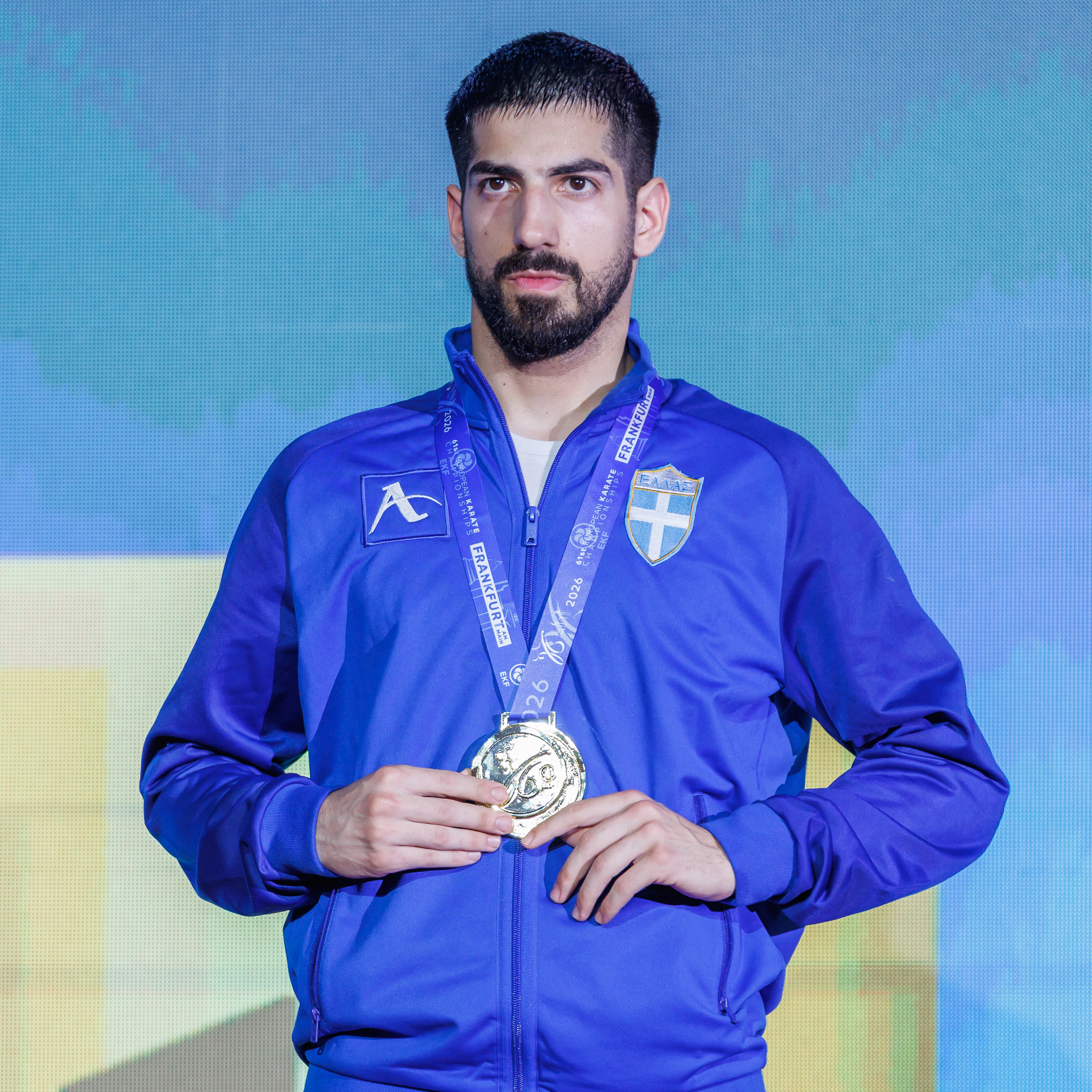
- Xenos 2026

Personal information
- Born: 21 March 2000 (age 26)

Sport
- Country: Greece
- Sport: Karate
- Weight class: 60 kg
- Events: Kumite; Team kumite
Medal record
Men's karate
Representing Greece
World Games
Bronze medal – third place	2025 Chengdu	Kumite 60 kg
World Championships
Gold medal – first place	2023 Budapest	Kumite 60 kg
Bronze medal – third place	2025 Cairo	Kumite 60 kg
European Games
Silver medal – second place	2023 Kraków-Małopolska	Kumite 60 kg
European Championships
Gold medal – first place	2024 Zadar	Kumite 60 kg
Gold medal – first place	2026 Frankfurt	Kumite 60 kg
Silver medal – second place	2023 Guadalajara	Kumite 60 kg
Silver medal – second place	2024 Zadar	Team kumite
Bronze medal – third place	2021 Poreč	Kumite 60 kg
Bronze medal – third place	2022 Gaziantep	Kumite 60 kg
Bronze medal – third place	2022 Gaziantep	Team kumite
Bronze medal – third place	2025 Yerevan	Team kumite
Mediterranean Games
Bronze medal – third place	2026 Taranto	Kumite 60 kg

Christos-Stefanos Xenos (born 21 March 2000) is a Greek karateka. He won the gold medal in the men's kumite 60 kg event at the 2023 World Karate Championships held in Budapest, Hungary. He is also a five-time medalist, including two gold medals, in this event at the European Karate Championships.

== Career ==
In May 2021, Xenos won one of the bronze medals in the men's kumite 60 kg event at the European Karate Championships held in Poreč, Croatia. In June 2021, he competed at the World Olympic Qualification Tournament held in Paris, France hoping to qualify for the 2020 Summer Olympics in Tokyo, Japan. In that same year, Xenos also competed in the men's 60 kg event at the 2021 World Karate Championships held in Dubai, United Arab Emirates.

Xenos won one of the bronze medals in the men's 60 kg event at the 2022 European Karate Championships held in Gaziantep, Turkey. He also competed in the men's 60 kg event at the 2022 Mediterranean Games held in Oran, Algeria.

Xenos won the silver medal in the men's 60 kg event at the 2023 European Karate Championships held in Guadalajara, Spain. He also won the silver medal in the men's 60 kg event at the 2023 European Games held in Poland. A few months later, Xenos won the gold medal in the men's 60 kg event at the 2023 World Karate Championships held in Budapest, Hungary. He defeated Kaisar Alpysbay of Kazakhstan in his gold medal match.

Xenos won the gold medal in the men's 60 kg event at the 2024 European Karate Championships held in Zadar, Croatia. He defeated Orges Arifi of Albania in his gold medal match.

== Personal life ==
His brother Dionysios Xenos also competes in karate.

== Achievements ==
Year	Competition	Venue	Rank	Event
2021	European Championships	Poreč, Croatia	3rd	Kumite 60 kg
2022	European Championships	Gaziantep, Turkey	3rd	Kumite 60 kg
2022	European Championships	Gaziantep, Turkey	3rd	Team kumite
2023	European Championships	Guadalajara, Spain	2nd	Kumite 60 kg
2023	European Games	Kraków and Małopolska, Poland	2nd	Kumite 60 kg
2023	World Championships	Budapest, Hungary	1st	Kumite 60 kg
2024	European Championships	Zadar, Croatia	1st	Kumite 60 kg
2024	European Championships	Zadar, Croatia	2nd	Team kumite
2025	European Championships	Yerevan, Armenia	3rd	Team kumite
2025	World Games	Chengdu, China	3rd	Kumite 60 kg
2026	European Championships	Frankfurt, Germany	1st	Kumite 60 kg
