= Maximiliano Larrosa =

Uruguayan karateka (born 1992)

Maximiliano Larrosa, also known as Maxi Larrosa (born 28 March 1992 in Maldonado, Uruguay) is a Uruguayan karateka.

== Awards ==
- Bronze at the 2019 Pan American Games, Lima, Peru
- Gold at the South American Karate Championship, Santa Cruz de la Sierra, Bolivia, 2017
- Bronze at the World University Karate Championship, Braga, Portugal, 2016
- Bronze at the XXVI South American Karate Championship, Cartagena, Colombia, 2016
