= Ayoub Anis Helassa =

Algerian karateka (born 2003)

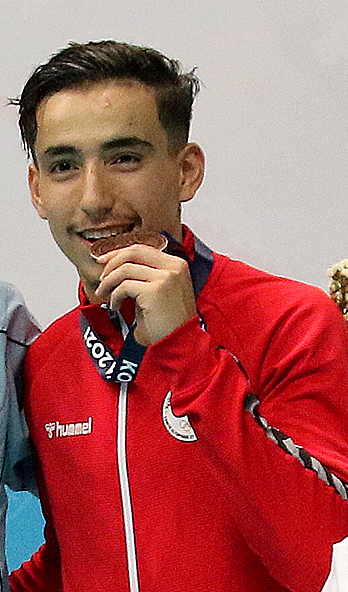
- 2021 Islamic Solidarity Games (2022)

Personal information
- Born: 27 August 2003 (age 22)

Sport
- Country: Algeria
- Sport: Karate
- Weight class: 60 kg
- Event: Kumite
Medal record
Men's karate
Representing Algeria
World Games
Gold medal – first place	2022 Birmingham	Kumite 60 kg
African Games
Gold medal – first place	2023 Accra	Kumite 67 kg
Silver medal – second place	2023 Accra	Team kumite
African Karate Championships
Silver medal – second place	2021 Cairo	Team kumite
Islamic Solidarity Games
Bronze medal – third place	2021 Konya	Kumite 60 kg
Bronze medal – third place	2025 Riyadh	Kumite 67 kg

Ayoub Anis Helassa (born 27 August 2003) is an Algerian karateka. He won the gold medal in the men's kumite 60 kg event at the 2022 World Games held in Birmingham, United States. He won one of the bronze medals in the men's 60 kg event at the 2021 Islamic Solidarity Games held in Konya, Turkey.

In November 2021, he was eliminated in his first match in the men's 67 kg event at the World Karate Championships held in Dubai, United Arab Emirates. In December 2021, he won the silver medal in the men's team kumite event at the African Karate Championships held in Cairo, Egypt.

== Achievements ==
Year	Competition	Venue	Rank	Event
2021	African Karate Championships	Cairo, Egypt	2nd	Team kumite
2022	World Games	Birmingham, United States	1st	Kumite 60 kg
2022	Islamic Solidarity Games	Konya, Turkey	3rd	Kumite 60 kg
2024	African Games	Accra, Ghana	1st	Kumite 67 kg
2024	African Games	Accra, Ghana	2nd	Team kumite
