= Saud Al-Basher =

Saudi Arabian karateka

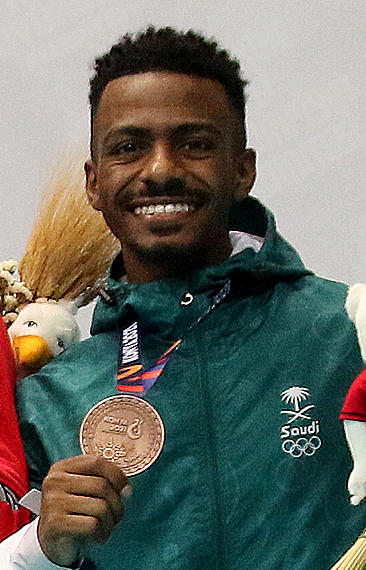

Sport
- Country: Saudi Arabia
- Sport: Karate
- Weight class: 60 kg
- Event: Kumite
Medal record
Men's karate
Representing Saudi Arabia
| Event | 1st | 2nd | 3rd |
|---|---|---|---|
| Asian Games | 0 | 0 | 1 |
| Asian Karate Championships | 1 | 2 | 1 |
| Islamic Solidarity Games | 0 | 0 | 2 |
| Total | 1 | 2 | 4 |
Asian Games
| Bronze medal – third place | 2026 Aichi-Nagoya | Kumite 60 kg |
Asian Championships
| Gold medal – first place | 2026 Bali | Kumite 60 kg |
| Silver medal – second place | 2017 Astana | Team kumite |
| Silver medal – second place | 2018 Amman | Kumite 55 kg |
| Bronze medal – third place | 2017 Astana | Kumite 60 kg |
Islamic Solidarity Games
| Bronze medal – third place | 2021 Konya | Kumite 60 kg |
| Bronze medal – third place | 2025 Riyadh | Kumite 60 kg |

Saud Al-Basher (Arabic: سعود البشير) is a Saudi Arabian karateka. He won the silver medal in the men's 55 kg event at the 2018 Asian Karate Championships held in Amman, Jordan. He won one of the bronze medals in the men's 60 kg event at the 2021 Islamic Solidarity Games held in Konya, Turkey.

== Achievements ==
| Year | Competition | Venue | Rank | Event |
|---|---|---|---|---|
| 2017 | Asian Championships | Astana, Kazakhstan | 3rd | Kumite 60 kg |
| 2017 | Asian Championships | Astana, Kazakhstan | 2nd | Team kumite |
| 2018 | Asian Championships | Amman, Jordan | 2nd | Kumite 55 kg |
| 2022 | Islamic Solidarity Games | Konya, Turkey | 3rd | Kumite 60 kg |
| 2025 | Islamic Solidarity Games | Riyadh, Saudi Arabia | 3rd | Kumite 60 kg |
| 2026 | Asian Championships | Bali, Indonesia | 1st | Kumite 60 kg |
| 2026 | Asian Games | Aichi and Nagoya, Japan | 3rd | Kumite 60 kg |
