= Mykyta Filipov =

Ukrainian karateka (born 2002)

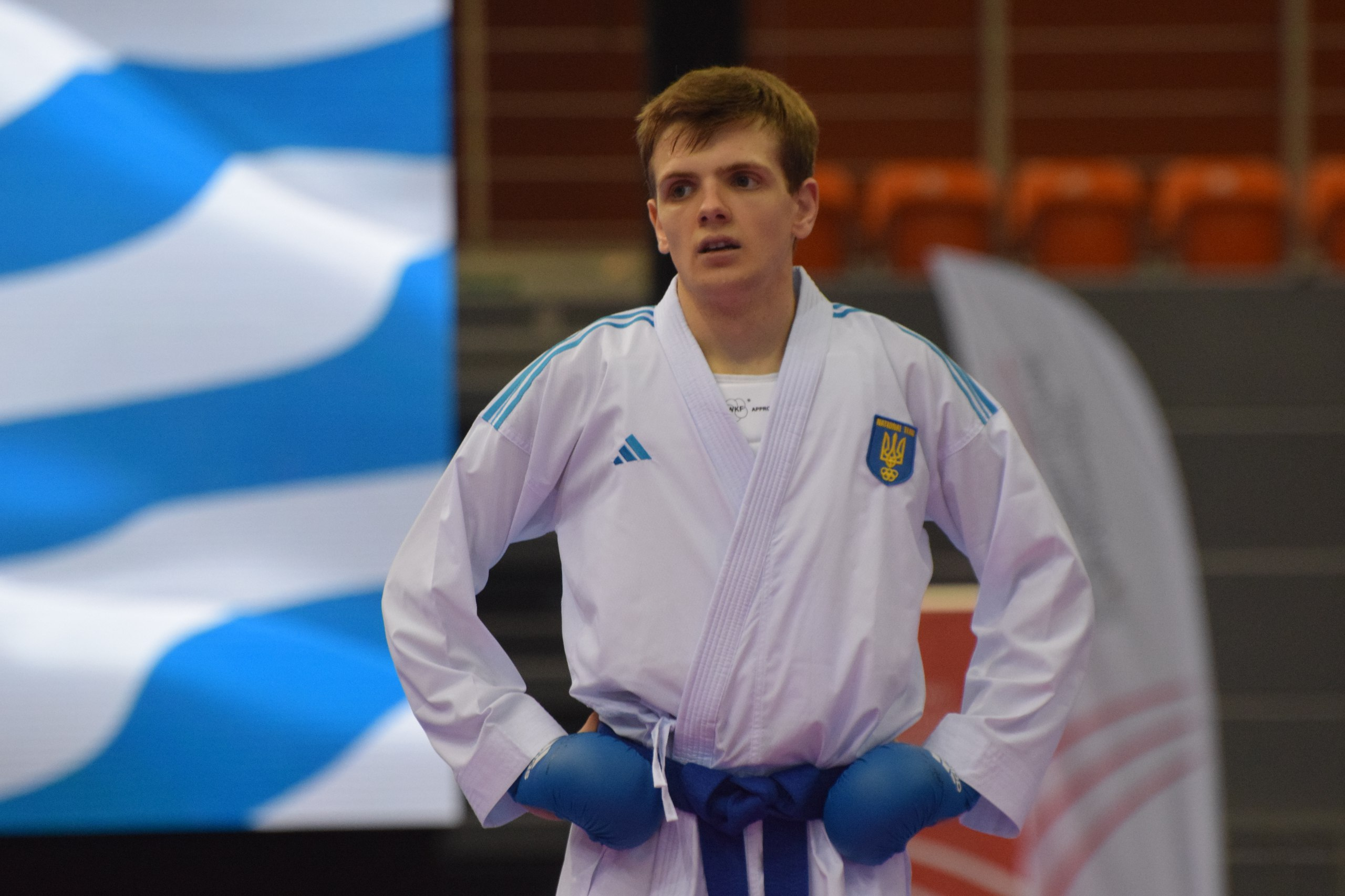
- Mykyta Filipov at the 2023 European Games
- Born: Микита (Нікіта) Філіпов; March 12, 2002 (age 24)
- Nationality: Ukrainian
- Height: 1.71 m (5 ft 7 in)
- Weight: 62 kg (137 lb; 9 st 11 lb)
- Style: Karate Kumite
- Team: "Чемпіон ГО СК" Kyiv
- Trainer: Maksym Nevmerzhytskyi, Hnat Pak

Mykyta Filipov (also Nikita Filipov, Ukrainian: Микита (Нікіта) Сергійович Філіпов; born 12 March 2002) is a Ukrainian karateka competing in the kumite 60 kg division. He is 2023 European Games bronze medallist.

Filipov represented Ukraine at the 2021 World Karate Championships in Dubai where he lost in the second round to Amir Khani. 2023 European Karate Championships was more successful for him: there he reached quarterfinals where he lost to the eventual silver medallist Christos-Stefanos Xenos from Greece. At the 2023 World Karate Championships in Budapest, Filipov again lost in the second round, this time to Algerian Alaeddine Salmi.
