= Angelo Crescenzo =

Italian karateka (born 1993)

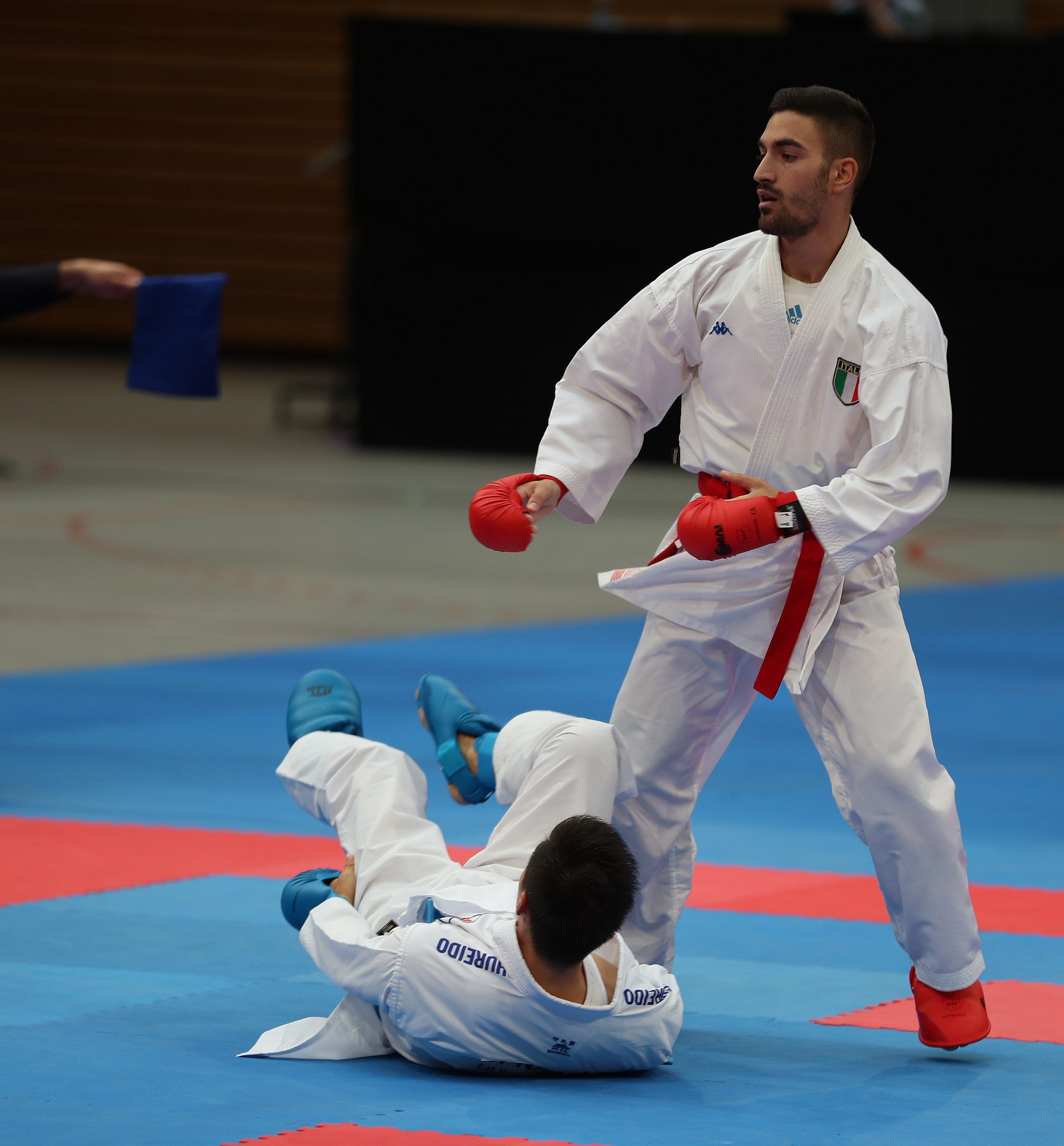
- Crescenzo in 2018

Personal information
- Born: 5 August 1993 (age 32) Sarno, Italy

Sport
- Country: Italy
- Sport: Karate
- Weight class: 60 kg
- Events: Kumite; Team kumite
Medal record
Men's karate
Representing Italy
World Championships
Gold medal – first place	2018 Madrid	−60 kg
Silver medal – second place	2021 Dubai	−60 kg
Bronze medal – third place	2023 Budapest	−60 kg
World Games
Bronze medal – third place	2022 Birmingham	−60 kg
European Games
Bronze medal – third place	2019 Minsk	−60 kg
Bronze medal – third place	2023 Kraków-Małopolska	−60 kg
European Championships
Gold medal – first place	2023 Guadalajara	−60 kg
Gold medal – first place	2024 Zadar	Team kumite
Gold medal – first place	2025 Yerevan	Team kumite
Silver medal – second place	2018 Novi Sad	−60 kg
Silver medal – second place	2019 Guadalajara	−60 kg
Silver medal – second place	2022 Gaziantep	−60 kg
Bronze medal – third place	2017 İzmit	−60 kg

Angelo Crescenzo (born 5 August 1993) is an Italian karateka athlete who won a gold medal at the 2018 World Karate Championships. He competed in the 2020 Summer Olympics, in Men's −67 kg. He won the gold medal in the men's 60 kg event at the 2023 European Karate Championships held in Guadalajara, Spain.

== Life and career ==
He was born in Sarno on 5 August 1993.

Crescenzo represented Italy at the 2020 Summer Olympics in Tokyo, Japan.

In November 2021, Crescenzo won the silver medal in the men's 60 kg event at the 2021 World Karate Championships held in Dubai, United Arab Emirates.

Crescenzo lost his bronze medal match in the men's 60 kg event at the 2022 Mediterranean Games held in Oran, Algeria. He won the bronze medal in the men's kumite 60 kg event at the 2022 World Games held in Birmingham, United States.

Crescenzo won the gold medal in the men's 60 kg event at the 2023 European Karate Championships held in Guadalajara, Spain. He won one of the bronze medals in the men's 60 kg event at the 2023 World Karate Championships held in Budapest, Hungary.

== Achievements ==
Year	Competition	Venue	Rank	Event
2018	World Championships	Madrid, Spain	1st	Kumite 60 kg
2019	European Games	Minsk, Belarus	3rd	Kumite 60 kg
2021	World Championships	Dubai, United Arab Emirates	2nd	Kumite 60 kg
2022	World Games	Birmingham, United States	3rd	Kumite 60 kg
2023	European Championships	Guadalajara, Spain	1st	Kumite 60 kg
2023	European Games	Kraków and Małopolska, Poland	3rd	Kumite 60 kg
2023	World Championships	Budapest, Hungary	3rd	Kumite 60 kg
2024	European Championships	Zadar, Croatia	1st	Team kumite
2025	European Championships	Yerevan, Armenia	1st	Team kumite
