= Abdullah Shaaban =

Kuwaiti karateka (born 1994)

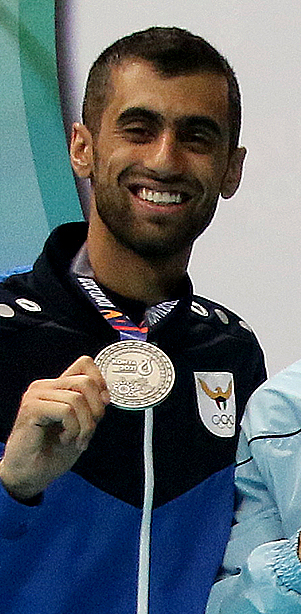
- Shaaban at the 2021 Islamic Solidarity Games in Konya, Turkey

Personal information
- Born: 12 June 1994 (age 32)

Sport
- Country: Kuwait
- Sport: Karate
- Weight class: 60 kg
- Event: Kumite
Medal record
Men's karate
Representing Kuwait
Asian Games
Gold medal – first place	2026 Aichi-Nagoya	Kumite 60 kg
Silver medal – second place	2022 Hangzhou	Kumite 60 kg
Islamic Solidarity Games
Silver medal – second place	2021 Konya	Kumite 60 kg
Silver medal – second place	2025 Riyadh	Kumite 60 kg
Bronze medal – third place	2013 Palembang	Kumite 55 kg
Asian Championships
Gold medal – first place	2018 Amman	Kumite 60 kg
Gold medal – first place	2022 Tashkent	Kumite 60 kg
Silver medal – second place	2015 Yokohama	Kumite 55 kg
Bronze medal – third place	2019 Tashkent	Kumite 60 kg
Bronze medal – third place	2021 Almaty	Kumite 60 kg
Bronze medal – third place	2025 Tashkent	Kumite 60 kg

Abdullah Shaaban (born 12 June 1994) is a Kuwaiti karateka. He won the silver medal in the men's 60 kg event at the 2021 Islamic Solidarity Games held in Konya, Turkey. He is also a two-time gold medalist in the men's 60 kg event at the Asian Karate Championships (2018 and 2022).

== Career ==
Shaaban won the gold medal in the men's 60 kg event at the 2018 Asian Karate Championships held in Amman, Jordan. He competed in the men's 60 kg event at the 2018 Asian Games held in Jakarta, Indonesia.

In 2021, Shaaban competed at the World Olympic Qualification Tournament held in Paris, France hoping to qualify for the 2020 Summer Olympics in Tokyo, Japan. He was eliminated in his third match by Firdovsi Farzaliyev of Azerbaijan and he did not qualify for the Olympics.

Shaaban competed in the men's kumite 60 kg event at the 2022 World Games held in Birmingham, United States. In 2023, he won the silver medal in the men's kumite 60 kg event at the 2022 Asian Games held in Hangzhou, China.

== Achievements ==
Year	Competition	Venue	Rank	Event
2013	Islamic Solidarity Games	Palembang, Indonesia	3rd	Kumite 55 kg
2015	Asian Championships	Yokohama, Japan	2nd	Kumite 55 kg
2018	Asian Championships	Amman, Jordan	1st	Kumite 60 kg
2019	Asian Championships	Tashkent, Uzbekistan	3rd	Kumite 60 kg
2021	Asian Championships	Almaty, Kazakhstan	3rd	Kumite 60 kg
2022	Islamic Solidarity Games	Konya, Turkey	2nd	Kumite 60 kg
2022	Asian Championships	Tashkent, Uzbekistan	1st	Kumite 60 kg
2023	Asian Games	Hangzhou, China	2nd	Kumite 60 kg
2025	Asian Championships	Tashkent, Uzbekistan	3rd	Kumite 60 kg
2026	Asian Games	Aichi and Nagoya, Japan	1st	Kumite 60 kg
