= Eray Şamdan =

Turkish karateka (born 1997)

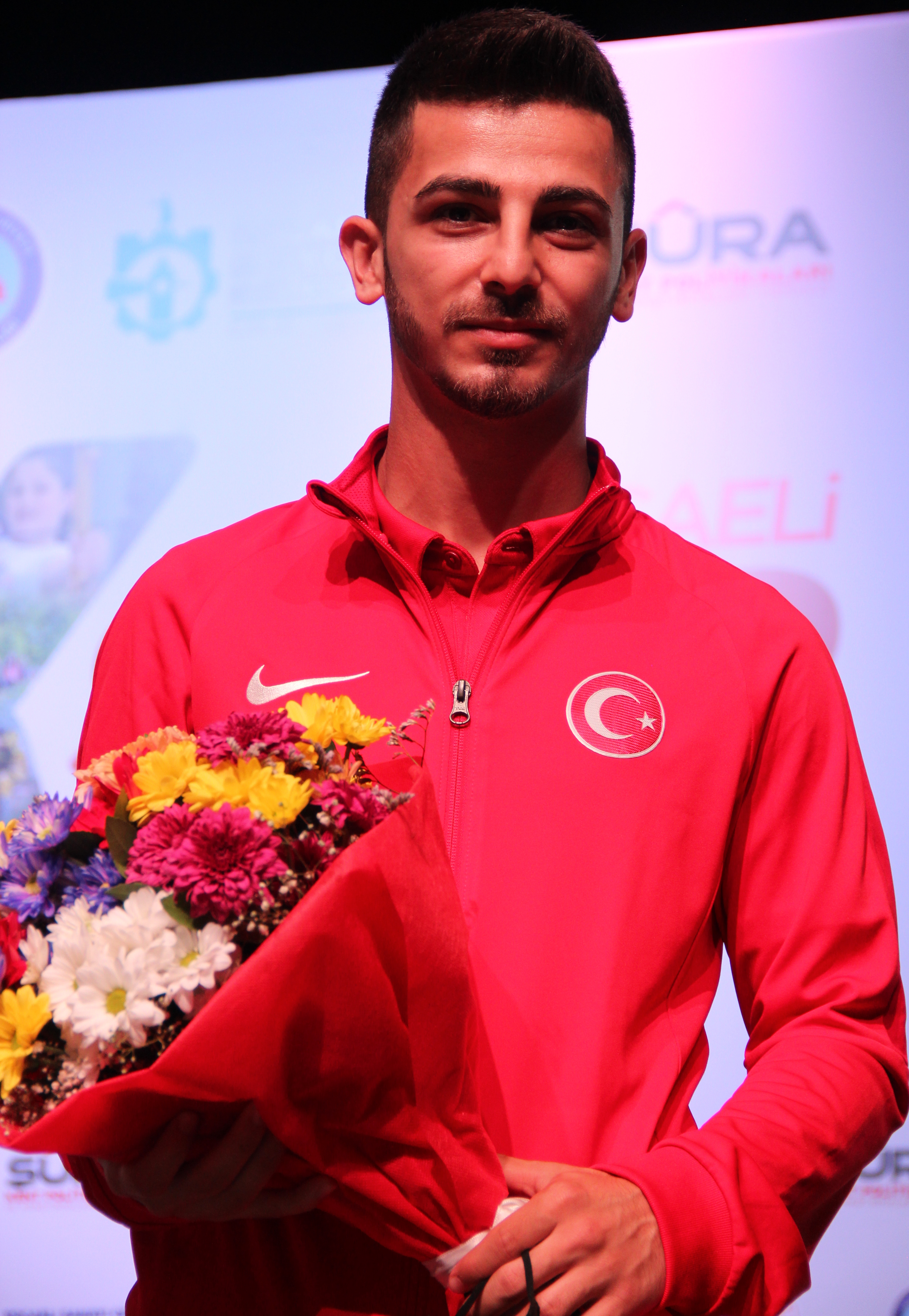
- Şamdan in 2021
- Born: 25 July 1997 (age 29); Kocaeli, Turkey
- Nationality: Turkish
- Height: 1.69 m (5 ft 7 in)
- Weight: 60 kg (132 lb; 9 st 6 lb)
- Style: Karate Kumite

Eray Şamdan (born 25 July 1997) is a Turkish karateka competing in the kumite. He won the silver medal in the men's 67 kg event at the 2020 Summer Olympics held in Tokyo, Japan.

== Career ==
In 2018, he took the bronze medal in the Kumite 60 kg event at the Mediterranean Games held in Tarragona, Spain. He won the bronze medal in the Kumite −60 kg event at the 2019 European Karate Championships in Guadalajara, Spain, and the gold medal in the same event at the 2021 European Championships in Poreč, Croatia.

He qualified at the World Olympic Qualification Tournament in Paris, France to represent Turkey at the 2020 Summer Olympics in Tokyo, Japan.

He won the gold medal in the men's 60 kg event at the 2022 Mediterranean Games held in Oran, Algeria. In the final, he defeated Ala Salmi of Algeria. He also won the gold medal in the men's 60 kg event at the 2023 European Games held in Poland. A few months later, he won one of the bronze medals in the men's 60 kg event at the 2023 World Karate Championships held in Budapest, Hungary.

He won one of the bronze medals in the men's 60 kg event at the 2024 European Karate Championships held in Zadar, Croatia.
