= 2024 European Karate Championships – Men's team kumite =

European Karate Championship

Men's team kumite at the 2024 European Karate Championships
- Venue: Krešimir Ćosić Hall
- Location: Zadar, Croatia
- Dates: 10, 12 May
- Nations: 28
- Teams: 28

Medalists
gold medal	Andrea Minardi; Lorenzo Pietromarchi; Angelo Crescenzo; Daniele De Vivo; Michele Martina; Matteo Avanzini; Matteo Fiore; Luca Maresca	Italy
silver medal	Christos-Stefanos Xenos; Athanasios Nikopoulos; Evangelos Seremetakis; Konstantinos Mastrogiannis; Sergios Karvounis; Georgios Baliotis; Nikolaos Drivas	Greece
bronze medal	Raybak Abdesselem; Enzo Berthon; Kilian Cizo; Mehdi Filali; Ryan Gari; Thanh-Liêm Lê; Adrian Marques; Younesse Salmi	France
bronze medal	Valerii Chobotar; Stanislav Horuna; Valerii Sonnykh; Ryzvan Talibov; Andrii Toroshanko; Kostiantyn Tsymbal; Andrii Zaplitnyi	Ukraine

The Men's team kumite competition at the 2024 European Karate Championships was held on 10 and 12 May 2024.

== Results ==
=== Final ===
Final
Greece	1
Italy	3

=== Top half ===
Round of 32
Hungary	1
Slovakia	3
Denmark	0
Cyprus	0
Montenegro	3
Latvia	1
Greece	3
Slovenia	0
England	0
Azerbaijan	3
Kosovo	3
Ireland	0

Round of 16
Slovakia	3
Denmark	2
Montenegro	3
Croatia	2
Greece	3
Azerbaijan	2
Kosovo	0
France	3

Quarterfinals
Slovakia	3
Montenegro	1
Greece	3
France	2

Semifinals
Slovakia	2
Greece	3

=== Bottom half ===
Round of 32
Georgia	3
Spain	0
Romania	2
Bosnia and Herzegovina	3
Portugal	0
Belgium	3
North Macedonia	2
Germany	2
Netherlands	0
Serbia	3
Albania	2
Italy	3

Round of 16
Georgia	3
Bosnia and Herzegovina	2
Belgium	0
Turkey	3
North Macedonia	3
Serbia	1
Italy	3
Ukraine	1

Quarterfinals
Georgia	1
Turkey	3
North Macedonia	0
Italy	3

Semifinals
Turkey	2
Italy	3

=== Repechage ===
Repechage round 1
Albania	1
Ukraine	3
Slovenia	1
Azerbaijan	3

Repechage round 2
North Macedonia	0
Ukraine	3
Azerbaijan	0
France	3

Bronze medals
Turkey	1
Ukraine	3
Slovakia	0
France	3
