= 2023 European Karate Championships – Men's team kumite =

European Karate Championship

Men's team kumite at the 2023 European Karate Championships
- Venue: Palacio Multiusos de Guadalajara
- Location: Guadalajara, Spain
- Dates: 23–26 March
- Nations: 27
- Teams: 27

Medalists
gold medal	Valerii Chobotar; Stanislav Horuna; Valerii Sonnykh; Ryzvan Talibov; Andrii Toroshanko; Kostiantyn Tsymbal; Andrii Zaplitnyi	Ukraine
silver medal	Enzo Berthon; Kilian Cizo; Jessie Da Costa; Steven Da Costa; Mehdi Filali; Thanh-Liêm Lê; Younesse Salmi	France
bronze medal	Jakov Bunjevac; Enes Garibović; Anđelo Kvesić; Ivan Kvesić; Ivan Martinac; Ante Mrvičić; Zvonimir Živković	Croatia
bronze medal	Eren Akkurt; Uğur Aktaş; Ömer Faruk Arslan; Enes Bulut; Ömer Abdurrahim Özer; Fatih Şen; Ömer Faruk Yürür	Turkey

The Men's team kumite competition at the 2023 European Karate Championships was held from 23 to 26 March 2023.

== Results ==
=== Finals ===
Semifinals
Ukraine	12
Croatia	6
Turkey	0
France	3

Final
Ukraine	3
France	2

=== Repechage ===
Repechage
Montenegro	3
Portugal	2

Bronze medal
Montenegro	1
Croatia	3

Repechage
Italy	2
Denmark	2

Bronze medal
Italy	2
Turkey	3

=== Top half ===
==== Section 1 ====
Round of 32
Sweden
Montenegro	w/o
Slovakia	(15)
Netherlands	(20)
Belgium	0
Portugal	0

Round of 16
Montenegro	3
Netherlands	1
Portugal	0
Ukraine	3

Quarterfinals
Montenegro	0
Ukraine	3

==== Section 2 ====
Round of 32
England	(22)
Scotland	(19)
Slovenia	1
Hungary	3
Germany	0
Croatia	3

Round of 16
England	(5)
Hungary	(10)
Croatia	(16)
Azerbaijan	(1)

Quarterfinals
Hungary	(0)
Croatia	(12)

=== Bottom half ===
==== Section 3 ====
Round of 32
Serbia	(2)
Turkey	(13)
Albania	3
Cyprus	1
Spain	(13)
Bosnia and Herzegovina	(6)

Round of 16
Turkey	3
Albania	0
Spain	1
Greece	3

Quarterfinals
Turkey	3
Greece	0

==== Section 4 ====
Round of 32
Italy	3
Poland	0
Ireland	(15)
Denmark	(23)

Round of 16
Italy	3
North Macedonia	1
Denmark	1
France	3

Quarterfinals
Italy	0
France	3
