= 2022 European Karate Championships – Men's team kumite =

European Karate Championship

Men's team kumite at the 2022 European Karate Championships
- Venue: Karataş Şahinbey Sport Hall
- Location: Gaziantep, Turkey
- Dates: 26–29 May
- Nations: 27
- Teams: 27

Medalists
gold medal	Enzo Berthon; Kilian Cizo; Hendrick Confiac; Jessie Da Costa; Steven Da Costa; Mehdi Filali; Younesse Salmi	France
silver medal	Panah Abdullayev; Tural Aghalarzade; Rafael Aghayev; Asiman Gurbanli; Rafiz Hasanov; Turgut Hasanov; Aykhan Mamayev	Azerbaijan
bronze medal	Valerii Chobotar; Stanislav Horuna; Valerii Sonnykh; Ryzvan Talibov; Andrii Toroshanko; Kostiantyn Tsymbal; Andrii Zaplitnyi	Ukraine
bronze medal	Theoharis Giannakos; Konstantinos Mastrogiannis; Dimitrios Stolis; Georgios Tzanos; Dionysios Xenos; Christos-Stefanos Xenos	Greece

The Men's team kumite competition at the 2022 European Karate Championships was held from 26 to 29 May 2022.

== Results ==
=== Finals ===
Semifinals
France	3
Belgium	1
Azerbaijan	3
Greece	0

Final
France	3
Azerbaijan	1

=== Repechage ===
Repechage 1
Sweden	0
Slovakia	3

Repechage 2
Slovakia	0
Ukraine	3

Bronze medal
Ukraine	3
Belgium	0

Repechage 2
Kosovo	1
Portugal	3

Bronze medal
Portugal	0
Greece	3

=== Top half ===
==== Section 1 ====
Round of 32
Hungary	1
Slovakia	3
France	3
Sweden	0
Bosnia and Herzegovina	3
Romania	2

Round of 16
Slovakia	1
France	3
Bosnia and Herzegovina	2
Ukraine	3

Quarterfinals
France	3
Ukraine	0

==== Section 2 ====
Round of 32
Turkey	3
Germany	0
Italy	3
Georgia	0
Denmark	2
Belgium	3

Round of 16
Turkey	2
Italy	0
Belgium	3
Montenegro	2

Quarterfinals
Turkey	1
Belgium	3

=== Bottom half ===
==== Section 3 ====
Round of 32
Portugal	3
Israel	1
Austria	3
Bulgaria	2
Slovenia	2
Kosovo	3

Round of 16
Portugal	2
Austria	0
Kosovo	1
Azerbaijan	3

Quarterfinals
Portugal	0
Azerbaijan	2

==== Section 4 ====
Round of 32
Greece	3
Serbia	1
Spain	3
North Macedonia	1

Round of 16
Greece	3
Cyprus	0
Spain	3
Croatia	1

Quarterfinals
Greece	3
Spain	1
