= 2025 World Karate Championships – Men's +84 kg =

Men's kumite +84 kg at the 2025 World Karate Championships
- Venue: Cairo Stadium Indoor Halls Complex
- Location: Cairo, Egypt
- Dates: 28–30 November
- Competitors: 32

Medalists
gold medal	Matteo Avanzini	Italy
silver medal	Saleh Abazari	Iran
bronze medal	Sanad Sufyani	Saudi Arabia
bronze medal	Ivan Kudzinau

The men's kumite +84 kg competition at the 2025 World Karate Championships was held from 28 to 30 November 2025.

== Results ==
=== Group phase ===
==== Group A ====
Pos	Athlete	B	W	D	D^{0}	L	Pts	Score	(Saudi Arabia)	(Algeria)	(Georgia (country))	(Dominican Republic)
1	Sanad Sufyani (KSA)	3	2	0	0	1	6 (Note: Sufyani (KSA) 8–3 Daikhi (ALG))	11–8	—	8–3	3–1	0–4
2	Hocine Daikhi (ALG)	3	2	0	0	1	6	8–9	3–8	—	1–1	4–0
3	Merabi Gelashvili (GEO)	3	1	0	0	2	3 (Note: Gelashvili (GEO) 5–2 Castillo (DOM))	7–6	1–3	1–1	—	5–2
4	Anel Castillo (DOM)	3	1	0	0	2	3	6–9	4–0	0–4	2–5	—

==== Group B ====
Pos	Athlete	B	W	D	D^{0}	L	Pts	Score	(Iran)	(Libya)	(Croatia)	(Greece)
1	Saleh Abazari (IRI)	3	2	0	1	0	6 (Note: Abazari (IRI) 4–0 Abdulsalam (LBA))	7–0	—	4–0	0–0	3–0
2	Nuri Abdulsalam (LBA)	3	2	0	0	1	6	3–5	0–4	—	1–0	2–1
3	Anđelo Kvesić (CRO) [3]	3	1	0	1	1	3	3–1	0–0	0–1	—	3–0
4	Athanasios Nikopoulos (GRE)	3	0	0	0	3	0	1–8	0–3	1–2	0–3	—

==== Group C ====
Pos	Athlete	B	W	D	D^{0}	L	Pts	Score	(Australia)		(Serbia)	(Ecuador)
1	Angel Georgieff (AUS)	3	2	0	0	1	6 (Note: Georgieff (AUS) 1–1, Kudzinau (WKF) 1–1, Quijada (SRB) 1–1. Scores obtained: Georgieff 13, Kudzinau 12, Tešanović 12. Kudzinau 1–0 Tešanović.)	13–11	—	4–0	1–7	8–4
2	Ivan Kudzinau (WKF-2)	3	2	0	0	1	6	12–5	0–4	—	1–0	11–1
3	Đorđe Tešanović (SRB)	3	2	0	0	1	6	12–2	7–1	0–1	—	5–0
4	César Vallejo (ECU)	0	0	0	0	3	0	5–24	4–8	1–11	0–5	—

==== Group D ====
Pos	Athlete	B	W	D	D^{0}	L	Pts	Score	(Chile)	(Italy)	(Ukraine)	(India)
1	Rodrigo Rojas (CHI)	3	3	0	0	0	9	21–4	—	3–1	9–3	9–0
2	Matteo Avanzini (ITA) [2]	3	2	0	0	1	6	14–3	1–3	—	8–0	5–0
3	Ryzvan Talibov (UKR)	3	1	0	0	2	3	11–19	3–9	0–8	—	8–2
4	Sudhir Sehrawat (IND)	3	0	0	0	3	0	2–22	0–9	0–5	2–8	—

==== Group E ====
Pos	Athlete	B	W	D	D^{0}	L	Pts	Score	(France)	(Senegal)	(Japan)	(Aruba)
1	Mehdi Filali (FRA)	3	3	0	0	0	9	18–4	—	5–0	7–1	6–3
2	Mouhamadou Falilou Diop (SEN)	3	1	0	0	2	3 (Note: Diop (SEN) 1–1, Yoshimura (JPN) 1–1, Timmermans (ARU) 1–1. Scores obtained: Diop 15, Timmermans 13, Yoshimura 11. Yoshimura 5–3 Timmermans.)	15–17	0–5	—	10–5	5–7
3	Fumiya Yoshimura (JPN)	3	1	0	0	2	3	11–20	1–7	5–10	—	5–3
4	Rob Timmermans (ARU)	3	1	0	0	2	3	13–16	3–6	7–5	3–5	—

==== Group F ====
Pos	Athlete	B	W	D	D^{0}	L	Pts	Score		(Bosnia and Herzegovina)	(Kazakhstan)	(South Africa)
1	Makar Golovin (WKF-1)	3	3	0	0	0	9	17–2	—	3–0	6–2	8–0
2	Anes Bostandžić (BIH) [4]	3	2	0	0	1	6	16–3	0–3	—	7–0	9–0
3	Dias Ulbek (KAZ)	3	1	0	0	2	3	10–13	2–6	0–7	—	8–0
4	Breshnev Dhlamini (RSA)	3	0	0	0	3	0	0–25	0–8	0–9	0–8	—

==== Group G ====
Pos	Athlete	B	W	D	D^{0}	L	Pts	Score	(United States)	(Czech Republic)	(Morocco)	(Luxembourg)
1	Eduard Sagilyan (USA)	3	3	0	0	0	9	16–9	—	5–0	7–6	4–3
2	Ondřej Bosák (CZE)	3	2	0	0	1	6	8–8	0–5	—	4–2	4–1
3	Reda Hanni (MAR)	3	1	0	0	2	3	15–13	6–7	2–4	—	7–2
4	Alexander Davies (LUX)	3	0	0	0	3	0	6–15	3–4	1–4	2–7	—

==== Group H ====
Pos	Athlete	B	W	D	D^{0}	L	Pts	Score	(Azerbaijan)	(Egypt)	(Brazil)	(Spain)
1	Asiman Gurbanli (AZE)	3	3	0	0	0	9	18–10	—	8–7	6–3	4–0
2	Taha Tarek Mahmoud (EGY) [1]	3	2	0	0	1	6	20–8	7–8	—	5–0	8–0
3	Giovani Salgado (BRA)	3	1	0	0	2	3	7–13	3–6	0–5	—	4–2
4	Borja Gutiérrez (ESP)	3	0	0	0	3	0	2–16	0–4	0–8	2–4	—

=== Elimination phase ===
Round of 16; 28 November
Taha Tarek Mahmoud (EGY)	3
Sanad Sufyani (KSA)	4
Ondřej Bosák (CZE)	3
Saleh Abazari (IRI)	4
Anes Bostandžić (BIH)	8
Angel Georgieff (AUS)	0
Mouhamadou Falilou Diop (SEN)	2
Rodrigo Rojas (CHI)	4
Matteo Avanzini (ITA)	1
Mehdi Filali (FRA)	0
Ivan Kudzinau (WKF-2)	4
Makar Golovin (WKF-1)	3
Nuri Abdulsalam (LBA)	7
Eduard Sagilyan (USA)	11
Hocine Daikhi (ALG)	2
Asiman Gurbanli (AZE)	4

Quarterfinals; 29 November
Sanad Sufyani (KSA)	0
Saleh Abazari (IRI)	3
Anes Bostandžić (BIH)	0
Rodrigo Rojas (CHI)	1
Matteo Avanzini (ITA)	4
Ivan Kudzinau (WKF-2)	0
Eduard Sagilyan (USA)	1
Asiman Gurbanli (AZE)	10

Semifinals; 29 November
Saleh Abazari (IRI)	7
Rodrigo Rojas (CHI)	0
Matteo Avanzini (ITA)	3
Asiman Gurbanli (AZE)	3

Final; 30 November
Saleh Abazari (IRI)	2
Matteo Avanzini (ITA)	2

Bronze medals 30 November
Sanad Sufyani (KSA)	9
Rodrigo Rojas (CHI)	1
Ivan Kudzinau (WKF-2)	8
Asiman Gurbanli (AZE)	2
