= 2023 European Karate Championships – Men's +84 kg =

European Karate Championship

Men's +84 kg at the 2023 European Karate Championships
- Venue: Palacio Multiusos de Guadalajara
- Location: Guadalajara, Spain
- Dates: 22, 25 March
- Competitors: 32 from 32 nations

Medalists
| gold medal | Mehdi Filali | France |
| silver medal | Georgios Tzanos | Greece |
| bronze medal | Babacar Seck | Spain |
| bronze medal | Anđelo Kvesić | Croatia |

The Men's +84 kg competition at the 2023 European Karate Championships was held on 22 and 25 March 2023.

== Results ==
=== Finals ===
Semifinals
(France) Mehdi Filali
(Ukraine) Ryzvan Talibov
(Greece) Georgios Tzanos | 2
(Turkey) Fatih Şen | 0

Final
(France) Mehdi Filali | 4
(Greece) Georgios Tzanos | 0

=== Repechage ===
Repechage 1
(North Macedonia) Stefan Stojanovikj | 3
(Belgium) Luca Costa | 3

Repechage 2
(Belgium) Luca Costa | 1
(Spain) Babacar Seck | 2

Bronze medal
(Spain) Babacar Seck | 3
(Ukraine) Ryzvan Talibov | 1

Repechage 1
(Romania) Ciprian Budui | 0
(Bosnia and Herzegovina) Anes Bostandžić | 2

Repechage 2
(Bosnia and Herzegovina) Anes Bostandžić | 0
(Croatia) Anđelo Kvesić | 0

Bronze medal
(Croatia) Anđelo Kvesić | 7
(Turkey) Fatih Şen | 3

=== Top half ===
==== Section 1 ====
Round of 32
(France) Mehdi Filali | 7
(North Macedonia) Stefan Stojanovikj | 1
(Republic of Ireland) Seán McCarthy Crean | 1
(Belgium) Luca Costa | 3
(Lithuania) Petras Ąžuolas Kalpokas | 0
(Poland) Maciej Gębka | 1
(Scotland) Greg Anderson | 0
(Spain) Babacar Seck | 1

Round of 16
(France) Mehdi Filali | 6
(Belgium) Luca Costa | 0
(Poland) Maciej Gębka | 0
(Spain) Babacar Seck | 1

Quarterfinals
(France) Mehdi Filali | 0
(Spain) Babacar Seck | 0

==== Section 2 ====
Round of 32
(Bulgaria) Roberto Petrov | 1
(Albania) Blodin Pakashtica | 0
(Hungary) Dániel Frankó | 0
(Ukraine) Ryzvan Talibov | 4
(Serbia) Đorđe Tešanović | 5
(Czech Republic) Ondřej Bosák | 3
(Portugal) Nuno Moreira | 0
(Azerbaijan) Asiman Gurbanli | 4

Round of 16
(Bulgaria) Roberto Petrov | 1
(Ukraine) Ryzvan Talibov | 5
(Serbia) Đorđe Tešanović | 9
(Azerbaijan) Asiman Gurbanli | 0

Quarterfinals
(Ukraine) Ryzvan Talibov | 5
(Serbia) Đorđe Tešanović | 0

=== Bottom half ===
==== Section 3 ====
Round of 32
(Romania) Ciprian Budui | 0
(Greece) Georgios Tzanos | 8
(Latvia) Artjom Jermolaev | 0
(Bosnia and Herzegovina) Anes Bostandžić | 1
(Denmark) Christian Petersen | 1
(Israel) Ahmad Abu Bassal | 0
(Montenegro) Nemanja Jovović | 1
(Croatia) Anđelo Kvesić | 4

Round of 16
(Greece) Georgios Tzanos | 1
(Bosnia and Herzegovina) Anes Bostandžić | 0
(Denmark) Christian Petersen | 1
(Croatia) Anđelo Kvesić | 2

Quarterfinals
(Greece) Georgios Tzanos | 1
(Croatia) Anđelo Kvesić | 0

==== Section 4 ====
Round of 32
(Austria) Thomas Reindl | 0
(Italy) Matteo Avanzini | 0
(Slovakia) Tomáš Kósa | 0
(Turkey) Fatih Şen | 0
(Cyprus) Matthaios Stylianou | 6
(Germany) Nikolai Sekot | 4
(Slovenia) Stefan Joksimović | 1
(Georgia (country)) Gogita Arkania | 5

Round of 16
(Italy) Matteo Avanzini | 0
(Turkey) Fatih Şen | 2
(Cyprus) Matthaios Stylianou | 1
(Georgia (country)) Gogita Arkania | 2

Quarterfinals
(Turkey) Fatih Şen | 3
(Georgia (country)) Gogita Arkania | 0
