= 2023 World Karate Championships – Men's +84 kg =

World Karate Championship

Men's kumite +84 kg at the 2023 World Karate Championships
- Venue: Budapest Arena
- Location: Budapest, Hungary
- Dates: 24, 28 October
- Competitors: 61 from 61 nations

Medalists
gold medal	Mehdi Filali	France
silver medal	Taha Mahmoud	Egypt
bronze medal	Đorđe Tešanović	Serbia
bronze medal	Sajad Ganjzadeh	Iran

The men's kumite +84 kg competition at the 2023 World Karate Championships was held on 24 and 28 October 2023.

== Results ==
=== Finals ===
Semifinals
(Brazil) Giovani Salgado	2
(Egypt) Taha Mahmoud	5
(France) Mehdi Filali	8
(Iran) Sajad Ganjzadeh	3

Final
(Egypt) Taha Mahmoud	1
(France) Mehdi Filali	3

=== Repechage ===
Repechage 2
(Serbia) Đorđe Tešanović	2
(Republic of Ireland) Seán McCarthy Crean	0

Repechage 3
(Serbia) Đorđe Tešanović	8
(Kazakhstan) Abylay Toltay	7

Bronze medal
(Serbia) Đorđe Tešanović	7
(Brazil) Giovani Salgado	6

Repechage 1
(Kenya) John Kyalo	0
(Thailand) Teerawat Kangtong	4

Repechage 2
(Thailand) Teerawat Kangtong	0
(Croatia) Anđelo Kvesić	5

Repechage 3
(Croatia) Anđelo Kvesić	2
(Curaçao) Rob Timmermans	1

Bronze medal
(Croatia) Anđelo Kvesić	0
(Iran) Sajad Ganjzadeh	1

=== Top half ===
==== Section 1 ====
First round
(Albania) Blodin Pakashtica	1
(Hungary) Botond Kapdebo	2
(Kuwait) Yousef Al-Otaibi
(Montenegro) Nemanja Jovović	w/o
(Kosovo) Benjamin Shabani	1
(Serbia) Stefan Joksimović	3
(Senegal) Mouhamadou Falilou Diop	1
(Bosnia and Herzegovina) Anes Bostandžić	6
(India) Yadav Amit Gorakh	0
(Tunisia) Houssem Eddine Choiya	6
Konstantin Kokovurov	8
(Venezuela) Edgar Chávez	1
(Canada) Fernando Aguilera	1
(Brazil) Giovani Salgado	4
(Algeria) Hocine Daikhi	0
(Ukraine) Ryzvan Talibov	0

Second round
(Hungary) Botond Kapdebo	2
(Montenegro) Nemanja Jovović	3
(Serbia) Stefan Joksimović	2
(Bosnia and Herzegovina) Anes Bostandžić	3
(Tunisia) Houssem Eddine Choiya	2
Konstantin Kokovurov	0
(Brazil) Giovani Salgado	6
(Ukraine) Ryzvan Talibov	4

Third round
(Montenegro) Nemanja Jovović	0
(Bosnia and Herzegovina) Anes Bostandžić	1
(Tunisia) Houssem Eddine Choiya	1
(Brazil) Giovani Salgado	2

Quarterfinals
(Bosnia and Herzegovina) Anes Bostandžić	4
(Brazil) Giovani Salgado	5

==== Section 2 ====
First round
(Portugal) Nuno Moreira	1
(Azerbaijan) Asiman Gurbanli	5
(Slovakia) Tomáš Kósa	2
(Jordan) Yousef Nofal	1
(Japan) Daiki Ando	2
(Turkey) Ahmet Bulut	3
(Chile) Benjamin Núñez	3
(Kazakhstan) Abylay Toltay	7
(Republic of Ireland) Seán McCarthy Crean	8
(Uzbekistan) Islombek Ismatullayev	5
(Argentina) Marcos Molina	0
(England) James Francis	6
(Serbia) Đorđe Tešanović	2
(Germany) Nikolai Sekot	1

Second round
(Azerbaijan) Asiman Gurbanli	2
(Slovakia) Tomáš Kósa	2
(Turkey) Ahmet Bulut	0
(Kazakhstan) Abylay Toltay	4
(Republic of Ireland) Seán McCarthy Crean	2
(England) James Francis	2
(Serbia) Đorđe Tešanović	0
(Egypt) Taha Mahmoud	2

Third round
(Azerbaijan) Asiman Gurbanli	3
(Kazakhstan) Abylay Toltay	6
(Republic of Ireland) Seán McCarthy Crean	1
(Egypt) Taha Mahmoud	5

Quarterfinals
(Kazakhstan) Abylay Toltay	0
(Egypt) Taha Mahmoud	2

=== Bottom half ===
==== Section 3 ====
First round
(Macau) Lou Wai Kit	1
(Thailand) Teerawat Kangtong	2
(Kenya) John Kyalo	0
(France) Mehdi Filali	8
(Italy) Simone Marino	5
(Poland) Maciej Gębka	1
(Greece) Georgios Tzanos	0
(Croatia) Anđelo Kvesić	3
(Romania) Ciprian Budui	1
(Bulgaria) Roberto Petrov	7
Aliaksei Vodchyts	5
(Denmark) Frederik Godthjælp Petersen	2
(Georgia (country)) Merabi Gelashvili	6
(Belgium) Luca Costa	14

Second round
(Thailand) Teerawat Kangtong	1
(France) Mehdi Filali	1
(Italy) Simone Marino	2
(Croatia) Anđelo Kvesić	6
(Bulgaria) Roberto Petrov	0
Aliaksei Vodchyts	8
(Belgium) Luca Costa	0
(Curaçao) Rob Timmermans	3

Third round
(France) Mehdi Filali	4
(Croatia) Anđelo Kvesić	0
Aliaksei Vodchyts	0
(Curaçao) Rob Timmermans	0

Quarterfinals
(France) Mehdi Filali	6
(Curaçao) Rob Timmermans	1

==== Section 4 ====
First round
(Czech Republic) Ondřej Bosák	1
(Chinese Taipei) Chen Yi-an	3
(North Macedonia) Berat Jakupi	1
(Iran) Sajad Ganjzadeh	2
(Colombia) Yerwin Mercado	2
(Australia) Daniel Tielen	4
(Morocco) Achraf Hbila	0
(Saudi Arabia) Tareg Hamedi	2
(United States) Emre Kivanc	1
(Cyprus) Demetris Demetriades	1
(China) Zhai Ang	1
(Scotland) Greg Anderson	5
(Israel) Ahmad Abu Basal	0
(Lithuania) Petras Ąžuolas Kalpokas	1

Second round
(Chinese Taipei) Chen Yi-an	0
(Iran) Sajad Ganjzadeh	5
(Australia) Daniel Tielen	0
(Saudi Arabia) Tareg Hamedi	5
(Cyprus) Demetris Demetriades	1
(Scotland) Greg Anderson	8
(Lithuania) Petras Ąžuolas Kalpokas	1
(Spain) Babacar Seck	6

Third round
(Iran) Sajad Ganjzadeh	3
(Saudi Arabia) Tareg Hamedi	3
(Scotland) Greg Anderson	1
(Spain) Babacar Seck	11

Quarterfinals
(Iran) Sajad Ganjzadeh	5
(Spain) Babacar Seck	3
