= 2022 European Karate Championships – Men's +84 kg =

European Karate Championship

Men's +84 kg at the 2022 European Karate Championships
- Venue: Karataş Şahinbey Sport Hall
- Location: Gaziantep, Turkey
- Dates: 25–28 May
- Competitors: 30 from 30 nations

Medalists
gold medal	Anđelo Kvesić	Croatia
silver medal	Luca Costa	Belgium
bronze medal	Ryzvan Talibov	Ukraine
bronze medal	Gogita Arkania	Georgia

The Men's +84 competition at the 2022 European Karate Championships was held from 25 to 28 May 2022.

== Results ==
=== Finals ===
Semifinals
(Ukraine) Ryzvan Talibov	0
(Belgium) Luca Costa	1
(Croatia) Anđelo Kvesić	6
(Scotland) Greg Anderson	1

Final
(Belgium) Luca Costa	7
(Croatia) Anđelo Kvesić	13

=== Repechage ===
Repechage 1
(Montenegro) Nemanja Jovović	0
(Turkey) Ömer Faruk Arslan	0

Repechage 2
(Turkey) Ömer Faruk Arslan	0
(Slovakia) Tomáš Kósa	1

Bronze medal
(Slovakia) Tomáš Kósa	1
(Ukraine) Ryzvan Talibov	6

Repechage 1
(Israel) Ahmad Abu Basal	0
(Czech Republic) Ondřej Bosák	3

Repechage 2
(Czech Republic) Ondřej Bosák	0
(Georgia (country)) Gogita Arkania	2

Bronze medal
(Georgia (country)) Gogita Arkania	1
(Scotland) Greg Anderson	0

=== Top half ===
==== Section 1 ====
Round of 32
(France) Mehdi Filali	8
(Hungary) Balázs Gyimesi	0
(Portugal) Mauro Hernandez	0
(Bosnia and Herzegovina) Rijad Džuho	1
(Ukraine) Ryzvan Talibov	4
(Poland) Maciej Gębka	0
(Azerbaijan) Asiman Gurbanli	2
(Greece) Georgios Tzanos	0

Round of 16
(France) Mehdi Filali	1
(Bosnia and Herzegovina) Rijad Džuho	0
(Ukraine) Ryzvan Talibov	3
(Azerbaijan) Asiman Gurbanli	0

Quarterfinals
(France) Mehdi Filali	7
(Ukraine) Ryzvan Talibov	7

==== Section 2 ====
Round of 32
(Montenegro) Nemanja Jovović	0
(Belgium) Luca Costa	8
(Turkey) Ömer Faruk Arslan	3
(Kosovo) Benjamin Shabani	0
(Austria) Robin Rettenbacher	0
(North Macedonia) Berat Jakupi	1

Round of 16
(Belgium) Luca Costa	0
(Turkey) Ömer Faruk Arslan	0
(North Macedonia) Berat Jakupi	0
(Slovakia) Tomáš Kósa	1

Quarterfinals
(Belgium) Luca Costa	1
(Slovakia) Tomáš Kósa	0

=== Bottom half ===
==== Section 3 ====
Round of 32
(Slovenia) Stefan Joksimović	1
(Georgia (country)) Gogita Arkania	7
(Serbia) Bogdan Trikoš	0
(Cyprus) Matthaios Stylianou	1
(Spain) Babacar Seck	0
(Czech Republic) Ondřej Bosák	4
(Israel) Ahmad Abu Basal	0
(Croatia) Anđelo Kvesić	3

Round of 16
(Georgia (country)) Gogita Arkania	1
(Cyprus) Matthaios Stylianou	0
(Czech Republic) Ondřej Bosák	0
(Croatia) Anđelo Kvesić	2

Quarterfinals
(Georgia (country)) Gogita Arkania	0
(Croatia) Anđelo Kvesić	2

==== Section 4 ====
Round of 32
(Germany) Konstantinos Papastergios	2
(Romania) Claudiu Cheleș	0
(Scotland) Greg Anderson	5
(Albania) Blodin Pakashtica	0
(Bulgaria) Roberto Petrov	2
(Denmark) Christian Petersen	5

Round of 16
(Germany) Konstantinos Papastergios	1
(Scotland) Greg Anderson	3
(Denmark) Christian Petersen	0
(Latvia) Artjom Jermolaev	3

Quarterfinals
(Scotland) Greg Anderson	4
(Latvia) Artjom Jermolaev	0
