= 2024 European Karate Championships – Men's +84 kg =

European Karate Championship

Men's +84 kg at the 2024 European Karate Championships
- Venue: Krešimir Ćosić Hall
- Location: Zadar, Croatia
- Dates: 10–11 May
- Competitors: 32 from 32 nations

Medalists
| gold medal | Anđelo Kvesić | Croatia |
| silver medal | Matteo Avanzini | Italy |
| bronze medal | Anes Bostandžić | Bosnia and Herzegovina |
| bronze medal | Mehdi Filali | France |

The men's +84 kg competition at the 2024 European Karate Championships was held from 10 to 11 May 2024.

== Results ==
=== Final ===
| Final |
| Anđelo Kvesić (CRO) | 6 |
| Matteo Avanzini (ITA) | 2 |

=== Top half ===
Round of 32
Bogdan Birdes (ROU) | 2
Greg Anderson (SCO) | 10
Niko Mantere (FIN) | 4
Murad Hajizade (AZE) | 5
Luka Vuković (SRB) | 2
Luca Costa (BEL) | 3
Blodin Pakashtica (ALB) | 0
Anes Bostandžić (BIH) | 2
Merabi Gelashvili (GEO) | 2
Kadir Furkan Genç (TUR) | 3
Danilo Bozhovikj (MKD) | 3
Matthaios Stylianou (CYP) | 4
Daniel Pedersen (DEN) | 0
Nikolai Sekot (GER) | 1
Ismail Bellemkhannate (NOR) | 0
Anđelo Kvesić (CRO) | 6

Round of 16
Greg Anderson (SCO) | 0
Murad Hajizade (AZE) | 3
Luca Costa (BEL) | 0
Anes Bostandžić (BIH) | 8
Kadir Furkan Genç (TUR) | 8
Matthaios Stylianou (CYP) | 4
Nikolai Sekot (GER) | 2
Anđelo Kvesić (CRO) | 2

Quarterfinals
Murad Hajizade (AZE) | 2
Anes Bostandžić (BIH) | 4
Kadir Furkan Genç (TUR) | 1
Anđelo Kvesić (CRO) | 8

Semifinals
Anes Bostandžić (BIH) | 1
Anđelo Kvesić (CRO) | 2

=== Bottom half ===
Round of 32
Matteo Avanzini (ITA) | 4
Benjamin Shabani (KOS) | 0
Ahmad Abu Bassal (ISR) | 0
Nemanja Jovović (MNE) | 3
Nuno Moreira (POR) | 2
Petras Ąžuolas Kalpokas (LTU) | 0
Stefan Petkov (BUL) | 0
Mehdi Filali (FRA) | 4
Stefan Joksimović (SLO) | 1
Alejandro Jiménez Diaz (ESP) | 0
Aliaksei Vodchyts (ANA) | 2
Issam Najdi (NED) | 0
Athanasios Nikolopoulos (GRE) | 0
Tomáš Kósa (SVK) | 0
Ondřej Bosák (CZE) | 0
Ryzvan Talibov (UKR) | 0

Round of 16
Matteo Avanzini (ITA) | 0
Nemanja Jovović (MNE) | 0
Petras Ąžuolas Kalpokas (LTU) | 0
Mehdi Filali (FRA) | 8
Stefan Joksimović (SLO) | 1
Aliaksei Vodchyts (ANA) | 0
Tomáš Kósa (SVK) | 3
Ondřej Bosák (CZE) | 4

Quarterfinals
Matteo Avanzini (ITA) | 2
Mehdi Filali (FRA) | 1
Stefan Joksimović (SLO) | 2
Ondřej Bosák (CZE) | 0

Semifinals
Matteo Avanzini (ITA) | 4
Stefan Joksimović (SLO) | 2

=== Repechage ===
Repechage round 1
Ismail Bellemkhannate (NOR) | 0
Nikolai Sekot (GER) | 5
Nemanja Jovović (MNE) | 0
Benjamin Shabani (KOS) | 1

Repechage round 2
Nikolai Sekot (GER) | 0
Kadir Furkan Genç (TUR) | 0
Benjamin Shabani (KOS) | 1
Mehdi Filali (FRA) | 5

Bronze medals
Anes Bostandžić (BIH) | 4
Kadir Furkan Genç (TUR) | 0
Stefan Joksimović (SLO) | 1
Mehdi Filali (FRA) | 2
