= Karate at the 2025 World Games – Men's kumite +84 kg =

Men's kumite +84 kg at the 2025 World Games
- Venue: Jianyang Cultural and Sports Centre Gymnasium
- Location: Chengdu, China
- Dates: 9 August
- Competitors: 8 from 8 nations

Medalists
gold medal	Ryzvan Talibov	Ukraine
silver medal	Anđelo Kvesić	Croatia
bronze medal	Saleh Abazari	Iran

The men's kumite +84 kg competition in karate at the 2025 World Games took place on 9 August 2025 at the Jianyang Cultural and Sports Centre Gymnasium in Chengdu, China.

== Results ==
=== Pool round ===
==== Pool A ====
Pos	Athlete	B	W	D	D^{0}	L	Pts	Score	(Ukraine)	(Croatia)	(Aruba)	(France)
1	Ryzvan Talibov (UKR)	3	3	0	0	0	9	14–5	—	3–0	6–2	5–3
2	Anđelo Kvesić (CRO)	3	2	0	0	1	6	2–3	0–3	—	1–0	1–0
3	Rob Timmermans (ARU)	3	1	0	0	2	3	4–8	2–6	0–1	—	2–1
4	Mehdi Filali (FRA)	3	0	0	0	3	0	4–8	3–5	0–1	1–2	—

Source: Chengdu 2025

==== Pool B ====
Pos	Athlete	B	W	D	D^{0}	L	Pts	Score	(Egypt)	(Iran)	(United States)	(China)
1	Taha Mahmoud (EGY)	3	2	1	0	0	7	14–4	—	2–2	4–2	8–0
2	Saleh Abazari (IRI)	3	1	1	0	1	4	8–8	2–2	—	4–3	2–3
3	Eddie Sagilyan (USA)	3	1	0	0	2	3 (Note: Sagilyan (USA) 10–5 Zhai (CHN))	15–13	2–4	3–4	—	10–5
4	Zhai Ang (CHN)	3	1	0	0	2	3	8–20	0–8	3–2	5–10	—

Source: Chengdu 2025

=== Finals ===
Semi-finals
Saleh Abazari (IRI)	0
Ryzvan Talibov (UKR)	4
Anđelo Kvesić (CRO)	6
Taha Mahmoud (EGY)	5

Gold medal bout
Ryzvan Talibov (UKR)	4
Anđelo Kvesić (CRO)	0
Bronze medal bout
Saleh Abazari (IRI)	6
Taha Mahmoud (EGY)	4
