= 2025 European Karate Championships – Men's +84 kg =

European Karate Championship

Men's +84 kg at the 2025 European Karate Championships
- Venue: Karen Demirchyan Sports and Concerts Complex
- Location: Yerevan, Armenia
- Dates: 7, 10 May
- Competitors: 26 from 28 nations

Medalists
| gold medal | Mehdi Filali | France |
| silver medal | Anđelo Kvesić | Croatia |
| bronze medal | Ryzvan Talibov | Ukraine |
| bronze medal | Matteo Avanzini | Italy |

The Men's +84 kg competition at the 2025 European Karate Championships was held on 7 and 10 May 2025.

== Results ==
=== Finals ===
Semifinals
(Croatia) Anđelo Kvesić | 1
(Ukraine) Ryzvan Talibov | 0
(Bosnia and Herzegovina) Anes Bostandžić | 0
(France) Mehdi Filali | 1

Final
(Croatia) Anđelo Kvesić | 1
(France) Mehdi Filali | 2

=== Repechage ===
Repechage 1
(Greece) Athanasios Nikopoulos | 1
(Czech Republic) Ondřej Bosák | 5

Bronze medal
(Czech Republic) Ondřej Bosák | 1
(Ukraine) Ryzvan Talibov | 4

Repechage 1
(Spain) Borja Gutiérrez | 4
(Estonia) Mihkel Mets | 2

Repechage 2
(Spain) Borja Gutiérrez | 2
(Italy) Matteo Avanzini | 4

Bronze medal
(Italy) Matteo Avanzini | 3
(Bosnia and Herzegovina) Anes Bostandžić | 0

=== Top half ===
==== Section 1 ====
Round of 32
(Czech Republic) Ondřej Bosák | 5
(Austria) Armin Selimovic | 1
(Germany) Nikolai Sekot | 5
(Finland) Niko Mantere | 0
(Greece) Athanasios Nikopoulos | 1
(Albania) Blondin Pakashtica | 1

Round of 16
(Czech Republic) Ondřej Bosák | 5
(Germany) Nikolai Sekot | 4
(Greece) Athanasios Nikopoulos | 0
(Croatia) Anđelo Kvesić | 2

Quarterfinals
(Czech Republic) Ondřej Bosák | 3
(Croatia) Anđelo Kvesić | 3

==== Section 2 ====
Round of 32
(Montenegro) Nemanja Jovović | 1
(Israel) Ahmad Abu Basal | 0
(Luxembourg) Alexander Davies | 2
(North Macedonia) Stefan Stojanovikj | 8
(Turkey) Kadir Furkan Genç | 5
Kirill Kovalev | 6

Round of 16
(Montenegro) Nemanja Jovović | 0
(North Macedonia) Stefan Stojanovikj | 0
Kirill Kovalev | 3
(Ukraine) Ryzvan Talibov | 10

Quarterfinals
(Montenegro) Nemanja Jovović | 0
(Ukraine) Ryzvan Talibov | 5

=== Bottom half ===
==== Section 3 ====
Round of 32
Ivan Kudzinau | 1
(Scotland) Greg Anderson | 1
(Denmark) Christian Godthjælp Petersen | 0
(Armenia) Davit Makyan | 3
(Cyprus) Mathaios Stylianou | 1
(Serbia) Luka Vuković | 3

Round of 16
(Scotland) Greg Anderson | 4
(Armenia) Davit Makyan | 1
(Serbia) Luka Vuković | 1
(Bosnia and Herzegovina) Anes Bostandžić | 1

Quarterfinals
(Scotland) Greg Anderson | 1
(Bosnia and Herzegovina) Anes Bostandžić | 3

==== Section 4 ====
Round of 32
(Estonia) Mihkel Mets | 7
(England) Bakary Darboe | 2
(Spain) Borja Gutiérrez | 0
(France) Mehdi Filali | 6
(Georgia (country)) Merabi Gelashvili | 5
(Slovakia) Tomáš Kósa | 0

Round of 16
(Estonia) Mihkel Mets | 2
(France) Mehdi Filali | 4
(Georgia (country)) Merabi Gelashvili | 2
(Italy) Matteo Avanzini | 3

Quarterfinals
(France) Mehdi Filali | 6
(Italy) Matteo Avanzini | 0
