= Luca Maresca =

Italian karateka (born 1993)

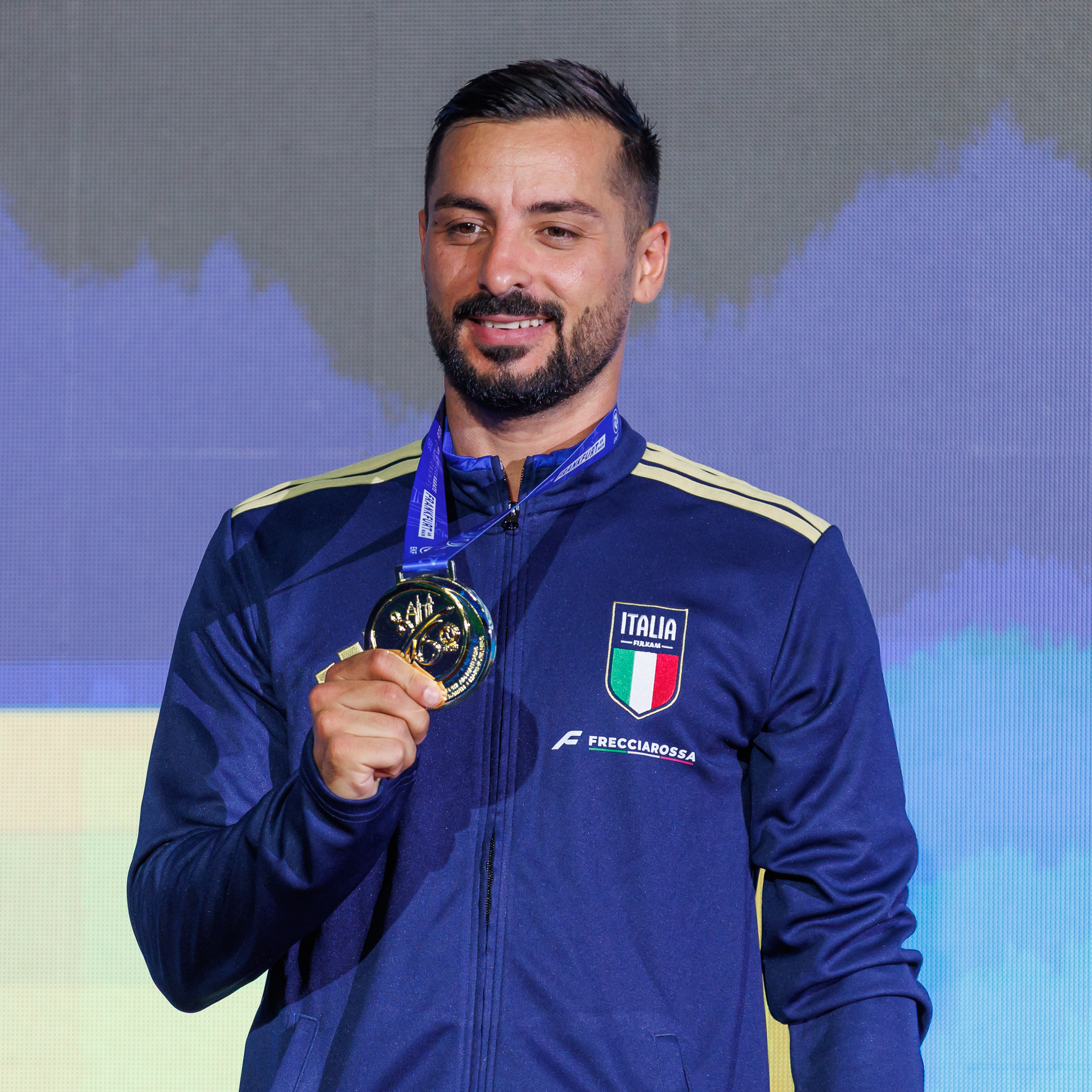
- Maresca in 2026

Personal information
- Born: 28 December 1993 (age 32) Naples, Italy

Sport
- Country: Italy
- Sport: Karate
- Weight class: 67 kg
- Events: Kumite; Team kumite
- Club: Fiamme Oro
Medal record
Men's karate
Representing Italy
World Championships
Gold medal – first place	2021 Dubai	Team kumite
Bronze medal – third place	2018 Madrid	Team kumite
Bronze medal – third place	2023 Budapest	Team kumite
European Games
Gold medal – first place	2019 Minsk	Kumite 67 kg
Silver medal – second place	2015 Baku	Kumite 60 kg
European Championships
Gold medal – first place	2015 Istanbul	Kumite 60 kg
Gold medal – first place	2024 Zadar	Team kumite
Gold medal – first place	2025 Yerevan	Team kumite
Gold medal – first place	2026 Frankfurt	Kumite 67 kg
Gold medal – first place	2026 Frankfurt	Team kumite
Mediterranean Games
Gold medal – first place	2013 Mersin	Kumite 60 kg
Silver medal – second place	2022 Oran	Kumite 67 kg
Bronze medal – third place	2026 Taranto	Kumite 67 kg

Luca Maresca (born 28 December 1993) is an Italian karateka. He won the gold medal in the men's kumite 67 kg event at the 2019 European Games held in Minsk, Belarus. Four years earlier, he won the silver medal in the men's kumite 60 kg event at the 2015 European Games held in Baku, Azerbaijan.

== Career ==
In 2013, Maresca represented Italy at the Mediterranean Games held in Mersin, Turkey, and he won the gold medal in the men's kumite 60 kg event. He also competed at the 2018 Mediterranean Games held in Tarragona, Catalonia, Spain, but did not win a medal this time; he finished in 5th place.

At the 2015 European Karate Championships held in Istanbul, Turkey, he won the gold medal in the men's kumite 60 kg event. In 2018, Maresca competed in the men's 67 kg event at the World Karate Championships held in Madrid, Spain. He won his first match against Rory Kavanagh of Ireland but lost his next match against Ali Elsawy of Egypt.

Maresca won the silver medal in the men's 67 kg event at the 2022 Mediterranean Games held in Oran, Algeria. In the final, he lost against Dionysios Xenos of Greece. Maresca lost his bronze medal match in the men's 67 kg event at the 2023 European Karate Championships held in Guadalajara, Spain.

== Achievements ==
Year	Competition	Venue	Rank	Event
2013	Mediterranean Games	Mersin, Turkey	1st	Kumite 60 kg
2015	European Championships	Istanbul, Turkey	1st	Kumite 60 kg
2015	European Games	Baku, Azerbaijan	2nd	Kumite 60 kg
2018	World Championships	Madrid, Spain	3rd	Team kumite
2019	European Games	Minsk, Belarus	1st	Kumite 67 kg
2021	World Championships	Dubai, United Arab Emirates	1st	Team kumite
2022	Mediterranean Games	Oran, Algeria	2nd	Kumite 67 kg
2023	World Championships	Budapest, Hungary	3rd	Team kumite
2024	European Championships	Zadar, Croatia	1st	Team kumite
2025	European Championships	Yerevan, Armenia	1st	Team kumite
