= 2026 European Karate Championships – Men's +84 kg =

Men's +84 kg at the 2026 European Karate Championships
- Venue: Eissporthalle Frankfurt
- Location: Frankfurt, Germany
- Dates: 20, 23 May
- Competitors: 33 from 33 nations

Medalists
gold medal	Matteo Avanzini	Italy
silver medal	Uğur Aktaş	Turkey
bronze medal	Anđelo Kvesić	Croatia
bronze medal	Hendrick Confiac	France

The men's +84 kg competition at the 2026 European Karate Championships was held on 20 and 23 May 2026.

== Results ==
=== Finals ===
Semifinals
(Croatia) Anđelo Kvesić	0
(Turkey) Uğur Aktaş	2
(Georgia (country)) Merabi Gelashvili	3
(Italy) Matteo Avanzini	4

Final
(Turkey) Uğur Aktaş	1
(Italy) Matteo Avanzini	4

=== Repechage ===
Repechage 1
(Serbia) Đorđe Tešanović	11
(Cyprus) Mathaios Stylianou	6

Repechage 2
(Serbia) Đorđe Tešanović	1
Ivan Kudzinau	3

Bronze medal
Ivan Kudzinau	0
(Croatia) Anđelo Kvesić	0

Repechage 1
(Albania) Blodin Pakashtica	0
(France) Hendrick Confiac	1

Repechage 2
(France) Hendrick Confiac	6
(Estonia) Mihkel Mets	3

Bronze medal
(France) Hendrick Confiac	8
(Georgia (country)) Merabi Gelashvili	0

=== Top half ===
==== Section 1 ====
Round of 64
(Spain) Borja Gutiérrez	3
(England) James Francis	1

Round of 32
(Spain) Borja Gutiérrez	0
(Azerbaijan) Asiman Gurbanli	1
(Armenia) Suren Kosakyan	2
(Denmark) Lucas Houlberg Mejlhede	0
(Croatia) Anđelo Kvesić	0
(Montenegro) Lazar Potpara	0
(Germany) Nikolai Sekot	2
(Bosnia and Herzegovina) Anes Bostandžić	1

Round of 16
(Azerbaijan) Asiman Gurbanli	6
(Armenia) Suren Kosakyan	2
(Croatia) Anđelo Kvesić	0
(Germany) Nikolai Sekot	0

Quarterfinals
(Azerbaijan) Asiman Gurbanli	0
(Croatia) Anđelo Kvesić	0

==== Section 2 ====
Round of 32
(Scotland) Greg Anderson	1
(Cyprus) Mathaios Stylianou	5
(Turkey) Uğur Aktaş	2
(Serbia) Đorđe Tešanović	0
Makar Golovin	1
(Switzerland) Mathis Bandelier	0
(North Macedonia) Stefan Stojanovikj	0
Ivan Kudzinau	2

Round of 16
(Cyprus) Mathaios Stylianou	2
(Turkey) Uğur Aktaş	7
Makar Golovin	0
Ivan Kudzinau	1

Quarterfinals
(Turkey) Uğur Aktaş	5
Ivan Kudzinau	2

=== Bottom half ===
==== Section 3 ====
Round of 32
(Poland) Krzysztof Sarba	0
(Georgia (country)) Merabi Gelashvili	1
(Kosovo) Benjamin Shabani	0
(Netherlands) Issam Najdi	1
(Greece) Michail Mokas	3
(Slovakia) Dominik Bohunický	0
(Romania) Ștefan Stanciu	1
(Ukraine) Ryzvan Talibov	7

Round of 16
(Georgia (country)) Merabi Gelashvili	3
(Netherlands) Issam Najdi	1
(Greece) Michail Mokas	0
(Ukraine) Ryzvan Talibov	3

Quarterfinals
(Georgia (country)) Merabi Gelashvili	4
(Ukraine) Ryzvan Talibov	4

==== Section 4 ====
Round of 32
(Estonia) Mihkel Mets	6
(Finland) Jimi Mantere	1
(Czech Republic) Ondřej Bosák	4
(Israel) Ahmad Abu Basal	7
(Lithuania) Petras Ažuolas Kalpokas	2
(France) Hendrick Confiac	4
(Albania) Blodin Pakashtica	1
(Italy) Matteo Avanzini	3

Round of 16
(Estonia) Mihkel Mets	7
(Israel) Ahmad Abu Basal	1
(France) Hendrick Confiac	3
(Italy) Matteo Avanzini	4

Quarterfinals
(Estonia) Mihkel Mets	1
(Italy) Matteo Avanzini	2
