= Saleh Abazari =

Iranian karateka (born 1998)

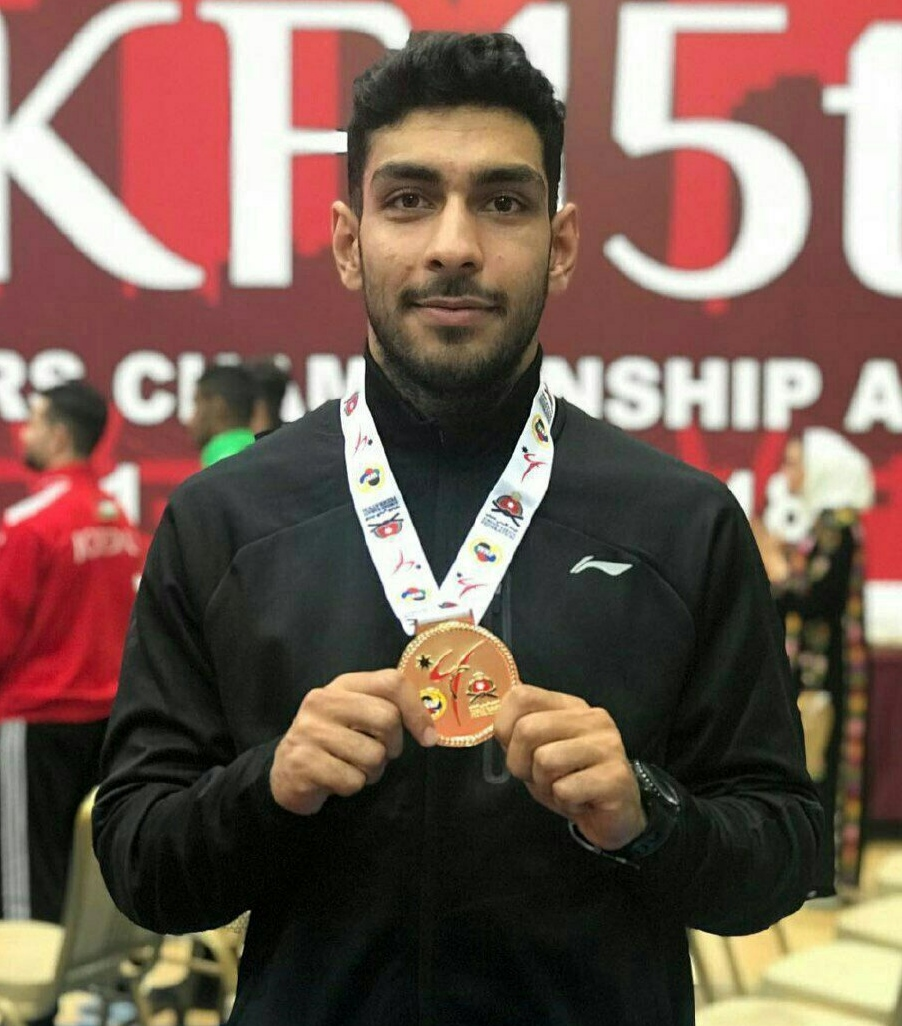
- Abazari in 2020

Personal information
- Born: 3 March 1998 (age 28) Arak, Iran

Sport
- Country: Iran
- Sport: Karate
- Weight class: +84 kg
- Events: Kumite; Team kumite
Medal record
Men's karate
Representing Iran
World Games
Bronze medal – third place	2025 Chengdu	Kumite +84 kg
World Championships
Gold medal – first place	2018 Madrid	Team kumite
Silver medal – second place	2025 Cairo	Kumite +84 kg
Asian Championships
Gold medal – first place	2018 Amman	Kumite +84 kg
Gold medal – first place	2018 Amman	Team kumite
Gold medal – first place	2019 Tashkent	Team kumite
Gold medal – first place	2023 Malacca	Team kumite
Silver medal – second place	2021 Almaty	Kumite +84 kg
Silver medal – second place	2021 Almaty	Team kumite
Silver medal – second place	2025 Tashkent	Team kumite
Silver medal – second place	2026 Bali	Team kumite
Bronze medal – third place	2022 Tashkent	Kumite +84 kg
Islamic Solidarity Games
Silver medal – second place	2025 Riyadh	Kumite +84 kg

Saleh Abazari (Persian: صالح اباذری, born 3 March 1998) is an Iranian karateka. At the 2018 Asian Karate Championships held in Amman, Jordan, he won the gold medal in the men's kumite +84 kg event. Iran also won the gold medal in the men's team kumite event.

Iran repeated this the following year in the men's team kumite event at the 2019 Asian Karate Championships held in Tashkent, Uzbekistan.

In July 2018, he won the gold medal in the men's kumite +84 kg event at the World University Karate Championships held in Kobe, Japan. He also won the silver medal in the men's team kumite event. A few months later, he was part of the Iranian team that won the gold medal in the men's team kumite event at the 2018 World Karate Championships held in Madrid, Spain.

In 2021, he won the silver medal in his event at the Asian Karate Championships held in Almaty, Kazakhstan. He also won the silver medal in the men's team kumite event.

He won one of the bronze medals in the men's kumite +84 kg event at the 2022 Asian Karate Championships held in Tashkent, Uzbekistan.

== Achievements ==
Year	Competition	Venue	Rank	Event
2018	Asian Championships	Amman, Jordan	1st	Kumite +84 kg
2018	Asian Championships	Amman, Jordan	1st	Team kumite
2018	World Championships	Madrid, Spain	1st	Team kumite
2019	Asian Championships	Tashkent, Uzbekistan	1st	Team kumite
2021	Asian Championships	Almaty, Kazakhstan	2nd	Kumite +84 kg
2021	Asian Championships	Almaty, Kazakhstan	2nd	Team kumite
2022	Asian Championships	Tashkent, Uzbekistan	3rd	Kumite +84 kg
2023	Asian Championships	Malacca, Malaysia	1st	Team kumite
2025	Asian Championships	Tashkent, Uzbekistan	2nd	Team kumite
2025	World Games	Chengdu, China	3rd	Kumite +84 kg
2026	Asian Championships	Bali, Indonesia	2nd	Team kumite
