= Knarik Airapetian =

Ukrainian karateka (born 1992)

- Born: 22 May 1992 (age 34)
- Nationality: Ukrainian
- Style: Kata

Knarik Airapetian (born 22 May 1992) is a Ukrainian karateka competing in kata in the K-30 category. She has won multiple medals at the World Karate Championships and the European Karate Championships.

== Career ==
In 2016, at the 2016 World Championships held in Linz, Austria, Airapetian, who is of Armenian descent, won the gold medal in her category where she was also awarded the women's para-karate MVP. In 2019, she won a silver medal at the European Championships.

In May 2021, Airapetian competed at the European Karate Championships and won a silver medal. She also won a bronze medal at the 2021 World Championships.

In May 2023, Airapetian competed at the European Karate Championships held in Guadalajara, Spain, where she won a silver medal. She also won a silver medal at the World Karate Championships following her disqualification for failing to bow.

In May 2024, Airapetian competed at the European Karate Championships held in Zadar, Croatia, finishing in seventh and last place.

Airapetian won a silver medal in the women's K-30 event at the 2025 European Karate Championships held in Yerevan, Armenia. She then competed at the World Karate Championships and won the silver medal.
