= 2025 European Karate Championships – Men's team kumite =

European Karate Championship

Men's team kumite at the 2025 European Karate Championships
- Venue: Karen Demirchyan Complex
- Location: Yerevan, Armenia
- Dates: 8–10 May
- Nations: 20

Medalists
gold medal	Luca Maresca; Angelo Crescenzo; Matteo Fiore; Daniele De Vivo; Matteo Avanzini; Michele Martina; Simone Marino	Italy
silver medal	Ivan Martinac; Boran Berak; Ivan Kvesić; Anđelo Kvesić; Dino Šimunec; Ivan Pehar; Toma Mileta; Mislav Plesivčak	Croatia
bronze medal	Ilias Psomas; Konstantinos Mastrogiannis; Georgios Baliotis; Konstantinos Zygouris; Athanasios Nikopoulos; Christos-Stefanos Xenos; Nikolaos Moraitis	Greece
bronze medal	Ryan Gari; Ilies Elguir; Issa Lardjoum; Kilian Cizo; Enzo Berthon; Mehdi Filali; Younesse Salmi; Thanh-Liêm Lê	France

The men's team kumite competition at the 2025 European Karate Championships was held from 8 to 10 May 2025.

== Results ==
=== Final ===
Final
Croatia	2
Italy	3

=== Top half ===
Round of 32
Denmark	0
Turkey	3
Kosovo	3
North Macedonia	1

Round of 16
Turkey	3
Serbia	1
Croatia	3
Ukraine	1
Kosovo	0
Spain	3
Montenegro	0
Greece	3

Quarterfinals
Turkey	2
Croatia	3
Spain	1
Greece	4

Semifinals
Croatia	3
Greece	2

=== Bottom half ===
Round of 32
England	2
Germany	2
Bosnia and Herzegovina	3
Georgia	0

Round of 16
Germany	2
Armenia	3
Netherlands	0
France	3
Bosnia and Herzegovina	3
Portugal	0
Slovakia	1
Italy	3

Quarterfinals
Armenia	0
France	3
Bosnia and Herzegovina	1
Italy	3

Semifinals
France	0
Italy	3

=== Repechage ===
Repechage round 1
Turkey	0
Ukraine	3
Slovakia	0
Bosnia and Herzegovina	3

Bronze medal match
Greece	3
Ukraine	1
France	3
Bosnia and Herzegovina	0
