= Michele Martina =

Italian karateka (born 1996)

Personal information
- Born: 18 November 1996 (age 29) Tivoli, Italy

Sport
- Country: Italy
- Sport: Karate
- Weight class: 84 kg
- Events: Kumite; Team kumite
Medal record
Men's karate
Representing Italy
World Championships
Gold medal – first place	2021 Dubai	Team kumite
Bronze medal – third place	2018 Madrid	Team kumite
Bronze medal – third place	2023 Budapest	Team kumite
European Games
Bronze medal – third place	2019 Minsk	Kumite 84 kg
Bronze medal – third place	2023 Kraków-Małopolska	Kumite 84 kg
European Championships
Gold medal – first place	2018 Novi Sad	Kumite 84 kg
Gold medal – first place	2023 Guadalajara	Kumite 84 kg
Gold medal – first place	2024 Zadar	Team kumite
Gold medal – first place	2025 Yerevan	Team kumite
Gold medal – first place	2026 Frankfurt	Team kumite
Bronze medal – third place	2021 Poreč	Kumite 84 kg
Mediterranean Games
Bronze medal – third place	2018 Tarragona	Kumite 84 kg

Michele Martina (born 18 November 1996) is an Italian karateka. Born in Tivoli, he won the gold medal in the men's kumite 84 kg event at the 2018 European Karate Championships held in Novi Sad, Serbia. He also won the gold medal in this event at the 2023 European Karate Championships held in Guadalajara, Spain.

== Career ==
At the 2018 Mediterranean Games held in Tarragona, Spain, he won one of the bronze medals in the men's kumite 84 kg event. In that same year, Martina won one of the bronze medals in the men's team kumite event at the 2018 World Karate Championships held in Madrid, Spain.

In 2019, Martina won one of the bronze medals in the men's kumite 84 kg event at the European Games held in Minsk, Belarus. In June 2021, he competed at the World Olympic Qualification Tournament held in Paris, France hoping to qualify for the 2020 Summer Olympics in Tokyo, Japan. In October 2021, Martina won the gold medal in his event at the 2021 Mediterranean Karate Championships held in Limassol, Cyprus. In November 2021, he competed in the men's 84 kg event at the World Karate Championships held in Dubai, United Arab Emirates.

Martina competed in the men's 84 kg event at the 2022 Mediterranean Games held in Oran, Algeria. He won the gold medal in the men's 84 kg event at the 2023 European Karate Championships held in Guadalajara, Spain.

== Achievements ==
Year	Competition	Venue	Rank	Event
2018	European Championships	Novi Sad, Serbia	1st	Kumite 84 kg
2018	Mediterranean Games	Tarragona, Spain	3rd	Kumite 84 kg
2018	World Championships	Madrid, Spain	3rd	Team kumite
2019	European Games	Minsk, Belarus	3rd	Kumite 84 kg
2021	European Championships	Poreč, Croatia	3rd	Kumite 84 kg
2021	World Championships	Dubai, United Arab Emirates	1st	Team kumite
2023	European Championships	Guadalajara, Spain	1st	Kumite 84 kg
2023	European Games	Kraków and Małopolska, Poland	3rd	Kumite 84 kg
2023	World Championships	Budapest, Hungary	3rd	Team kumite
2024	European Championships	Zadar, Croatia	1st	Team kumite
2025	European Championships	Yerevan, Armenia	1st	Team kumite
2026	European Championships	Frankfurt, Germany	1st	Team kumite
