= 2023 World Karate Championships – Men's team kumite =

Men's team kumite at the 2023 World Karate Championships
- Venue: László Papp Budapest Sports Arena
- Location: Budapest, Hungary
- Dates: 26–29 October
- Nations: 46
- Teams: 46

Medalists
gold medal	Zaki Abu Qaoud; Mohammad Al-Jafari; Afeef Ghaith; Abdallah Hammad; Hasan Masarweh; Yousef Nofal; Ahmad Shadid	Jordan
silver medal	Abdalla Abdelaziz; Abdalla Hesham Abdelgawad; Youssef Badawy; Ahmed El-Masry; Ali El-Sawy; Taha Tarek Mahmoud; Omar Ashraf Mohamed	Egypt
bronze medal	Enzo Berthon; Kilian Cizo; Jessie Da Costa; Steven Da Costa; Mehdi Filali; Thanh-Liêm Lê; Younesse Salmi	France
bronze medal	Matteo Avanzini; Matteo Fiore; Luca Maresca; Simone Marino; Michele Martina; Andre Minardi; Lorenzo Pietromarchi	Italy

The men's team kumite competition at the 2023 World Karate Championships was held from 26 to 29 October 2023.

== Results ==
=== Finals ===
Semifinals
Egypt	3
France	1
Azerbaijan	0
Jordan	3

Final
Egypt	(10)
Jordan	(14)

=== Repechage ===
Repechage 1
Croatia	0
Kazakhstan	3

Repechage 2
Kazakhstan	3
Ukraine	0

Bronze medal
Kazakhstan	2
France	3

Repechage 1
Kosovo	0
Italy	3

Repechage 2
Italy	3
Slovakia	1

Bronze medal
Italy	3
Azerbaijan	1

=== Top half ===
==== Section 1 ====
First round
Albania	0
Turkey	3
Ireland	2
Netherlands	3
Kenya	0
Croatia	3
Portugal	2
Australia	3

Second round
Turkey	2
Ukraine	3
Netherlands	0
Morocco	3
Croatia	1
Egypt	3
Australia	2
Kazakhstan	3

Third round
Ukraine	3
Morocco	0
Egypt	3
Kazakhstan	1

Quarterfinals
Ukraine	0
Egypt	3

==== Section 2 ====
First round
Germany	2
Hungary	2
Senegal	1
Bosnia and Herzegovina	3
Scotland	1
Saudi Arabia	3

Second round
Hungary	2
Romania	1
Bosnia and Herzegovina	3
Canada	0
Saudi Arabia	3
Czech Republic	0
France	3
Serbia	0

Third round
Hungary	0
Bosnia and Herzegovina	3
Saudi Arabia	0
France	3

Quarterfinals
Bosnia and Herzegovina	2
France	3

=== Bottom half ===
==== Section 3 ====
First round
Switzerland	0
Iran	3
Kuwait	0
Chinese Taipei	3
Georgia	3
North Macedonia	1
Spain	3
Greece	2

Second round
Iran	3
Latvia	0
Chinese Taipei	1
Algeria	3
Georgia	3
Bulgaria	0
Spain	1
Azerbaijan	3

Third round
Iran	3
Algeria	1
Georgia	0
Azerbaijan	3

Quarterfinals
Iran	2
Azerbaijan	3

==== Section 4 ====
First round
United States	2
Denmark	3
Slovenia	2
Uzbekistan	3
Kosovo	3
Belgium	1

Second round
Denmark	1
Montenegro	3
Uzbekistan	1
Slovakia	3
Kosovo	0
Jordan	3
Japan	2
Italy	3

Third round
Montenegro	1
Slovakia	3
Jordan	3
Italy	0

Quarterfinals
Slovakia	0
Jordan	3
