= 2024 European Karate Championships =

2024 European Championships
- Venue: Krešimir Ćosić Hall
- Location: Zadar, Croatia
- Dates: 8–12 May
- Competitors: 578 from 51 nations

The 2024 European Karate Championships is the 59th edition of the European Karate Championships and 6th European Para Karate Championships and were held in Zadar, Croatia from 8 to 12 May 2024.

== Medal table ==
* Host nation (Croatia)

Rank	Nation	Gold	Silver	Bronze	Total
1	Turkey	3	0	7	10
2	Germany	3	0	2	5
3	Croatia*	3	0	1	4
4	Greece	2	1	2	5
5	Italy	1	5	3	9
6	Spain	1	3	2	6
7	France	1	0	6	7
8	Hungary	1	0	0	1
8	Slovakia	1	0	0	1
10	Albania	0	1	0	1
10	Austria	0	1	0	1
10	England	0	1	0	1
10	Montenegro	0	1	0	1
10	Netherlands	0	1	0	1
10	North Macedonia	0	1	0	1
10	Switzerland	0	1	0	1
17	Ukraine	0	0	3	3
18	Azerbaijan	0	0	2	2
19	Bosnia and Herzegovina	0	0	1	1
19	Portugal	0	0	1	1
19	Slovenia	0	0	1	1
19	Sweden	0	0	1	1
Totals (22 entries)		16	16	32	64

== Medalists ==
=== Men ===
Event	Gold	Silver	Bronze
Individual kata	Ali Sofuoğlu; Turkey	Damián Quintero; Spain	Anthony Vu; Sweden
Individual kata	Ali Sofuoğlu; Turkey	Damián Quintero; Spain	Alessio Ghinami; Italy
Team kata	Turkey; Ali Sofuoğlu; Emre Vefa Göktaş; Enes Özdemir	Spain; Salvador Cisneros; Sergio Galán; Raúl Martín; Damián Quintero	Italy; Mattia Busato; Gianluca Gallo; Alessio Ghinami; Alessandro Iodice
Team kata	Turkey; Ali Sofuoğlu; Emre Vefa Göktaş; Enes Özdemir	Spain; Salvador Cisneros; Sergio Galán; Raúl Martín; Damián Quintero	Azerbaijan; Rovshan Aliyev; Ismayil Guliyev; Hasanali Hasanov; Roman Heydarov
Kumite −60 kg	Christos-Stefanos Xenos; Greece	Orges Arifi; Albania	Ahmed El Amine Hellal; France
Kumite −60 kg	Christos-Stefanos Xenos; Greece	Orges Arifi; Albania	Eray Şamdan; Turkey
Kumite −67 kg	Yves Martial Tadissi; Hungary	Nenad Dulović; Montenegro	Huseyn Mammadli; Azerbaijan
Kumite −67 kg	Yves Martial Tadissi; Hungary	Nenad Dulović; Montenegro	Georgios Baliotis; Greece
Kumite −75 kg	Ivan Martinac; Croatia	Daniele De Vivo; Italy	Enes Bulut; Turkey
Kumite −75 kg	Ivan Martinac; Croatia	Daniele De Vivo; Italy	Tiago Duarte; Portugal
Kumite −84 kg	Konstantinos Mastrogiannis; Greece	Brian Timmermans; Netherlands	Ivan Kvesić; Croatia
Kumite −84 kg	Konstantinos Mastrogiannis; Greece	Brian Timmermans; Netherlands	Valerii Chobotar; Ukraine
Kumite +84 kg	Anđelo Kvesić; Croatia	Matteo Avanzini; Italy	Anes Bostandžić; Bosnia and Herzegovina
Kumite +84 kg	Anđelo Kvesić; Croatia	Matteo Avanzini; Italy	Mehdi Filali; France
Team kumite	Italy; Andrea Minardi; Lorenzo Pietromarchi; Angelo Crescenzo; Daniele De Vivo; Michele Martina; Matteo Avanzini; Matteo Fiore; Luca Maresca	Greece; Christos-Stefanos Xenos; Athanasios Nikopoulos; Evangelos Seremetakis; Konstantinos Mastrogiannis; Sergios Karvounis; Georgios Baliotis; Nikolaos Drivas	France; Raybak Abdesselem; Enzo Berthon; Kilian Cizo; Mehdi Filali; Ryan Gari; Thanh-Liêm Lê; Adrian Marques; Younesse Salmi
Team kumite	Italy; Andrea Minardi; Lorenzo Pietromarchi; Angelo Crescenzo; Daniele De Vivo; Michele Martina; Matteo Avanzini; Matteo Fiore; Luca Maresca	Greece; Christos-Stefanos Xenos; Athanasios Nikopoulos; Evangelos Seremetakis; Konstantinos Mastrogiannis; Sergios Karvounis; Georgios Baliotis; Nikolaos Drivas	Ukraine; Valerii Chobotar; Stanislav Horuna; Valerii Sonnykh; Ryzvan Talibov; Andrii Toroshanko; Kostiantyn Tsymbal; Andrii Zaplitnyi

=== Women ===
Event	Gold	Silver	Bronze
Individual kata	Dilara Bozan; Turkey	Terryana D'Onofrio; Italy	Paola García; Spain
Individual kata	Dilara Bozan; Turkey	Terryana D'Onofrio; Italy	Jasmin Jüttner; Germany
Team kata	Spain; María López; Gema Ozuna; Raquel Roy	Italy; Terryana D'Onofrio; Michela Rizzo; Elena Roversi	Turkey; Damla Su Türemen; Zehra Kaya; Damla Pelit; Elif Karaboğa
Team kata	Spain; María López; Gema Ozuna; Raquel Roy	Italy; Terryana D'Onofrio; Michela Rizzo; Elena Roversi	France; Maï-Linh Bui; Marie Bui; Léa Severan
Kumite −50 kg	Ema Sgardelli; Croatia	Mihaela Mishovska; North Macedonia	Selva Küçükoğlu; Turkey
Kumite −50 kg	Ema Sgardelli; Croatia	Mihaela Mishovska; North Macedonia	Erminia Perfetto; Italy
Kumite −55 kg	Mia Bitsch; Germany	Sonia Pereira; Spain	Maria Stoli; Greece
Kumite −55 kg	Mia Bitsch; Germany	Sonia Pereira; Spain	Tuba Yakan; Turkey
Kumite −61 kg	Ingrida Bakoš Suchánková; Slovakia	Lejla Topalovic; Austria	Fatma Naz Yenen; Turkey
Kumite −61 kg	Ingrida Bakoš Suchánková; Slovakia	Lejla Topalovic; Austria	Reem Khamis; Germany
Kumite −68 kg	Alizée Agier; France	Elena Quirici; Switzerland	María Nieto; Spain
Kumite −68 kg	Alizée Agier; France	Elena Quirici; Switzerland	Elina Sieliemienieva; Ukraine
Kumite +68 kg	Johanna Kneer; Germany	Rochelle Walters; England	Nancy Garcia; France
Kumite +68 kg	Johanna Kneer; Germany	Rochelle Walters; England	Zala Maria Žibret; Slovenia
Team kumite	Germany; Mia Bitsch; Shara Hubrich; Reem Khamis; Johanna Kneer; Madeleine Schröter	Italy; Giulia Angelucci; Anna Pia Desiderio; Pamela Bodei; Clio Ferracuti; Viola Lallo	Turkey; Sudenur Aksoy; Eda Eltemur; Gülbahar Gözütok; Tuba Yakan; Fatma Naz Yenen
Team kumite	Germany; Mia Bitsch; Shara Hubrich; Reem Khamis; Johanna Kneer; Madeleine Schröter	Italy; Giulia Angelucci; Anna Pia Desiderio; Pamela Bodei; Clio Ferracuti; Viola Lallo	France; Alizée Agier; Léa Avazeri; Thalya Sombe; Jennifer Zameto

== Participating nations ==
578 athletes from 51 countries participated:

1. Albania (5)
2. Andorra (1)
3. Armenia (3)
4. Austria (13)
5. Azerbaijan (16)
6. Belgium (13)
7. Bosnia and Herzegovina (23)
8. Bulgaria (7)
9. Croatia (27)
10. Cyprus (9)
11. Czech Republic (13)
12. Denmark (12)
13. England (14)
14. Estonia (1)
15. Finland (6)
16. France (26)
17. Georgia (8)
18. Germany (20)
19. Greece (14)
20. Hungary (13)
21. Iceland (2)
22. Individual Neutral Athletes – 1 (1)
23. Individual Neutral Athletes – 2 (10)
24. Ireland (8)
25. Israel (3)
26. Italy (22)
27. Kosovo (14)
28. Latvia (11)
29. Liechtenstein (3)
30. Lithuania (5)
31. Luxembourg (3)
32. Moldova (2)
33. North Macedonia (17)
34. Montenegro (19)
35. Netherlands (12)
36. Norway (4)
37. Poland (14)
38. Portugal (18)
39. Refugee Karate Team (2)
40. Romania (11)
41. San Marino (2)
42. Scotland (8)
43. Serbia (22)
44. Slovakia (15)
45. Slovenia (12)
46. Spain (22)
47. Sweden (9)
48. Switzerland (16)
49. Turkey (25)
50. Ukraine (20)
51. Wales (2)

== Para Karate ==
Event	Gold	Silver	Bronze
Men's K-10	Nohan Dudon; France	Nihat Mammadzada; Azerbaijan	Francisco Lozano; Spain
Men's K-10	Nohan Dudon; France	Nihat Mammadzada; Azerbaijan	Dorin Alexe; Romania
Men's K-21	Carlos Huertas; Spain	Albert Singer; Germany	Mike Richter; Germany
Men's K-21	Carlos Huertas; Spain	Albert Singer; Germany	António Pereira; Portugal
Men's K-22	Mattia Allesina; Italy	Stipe Barić; Croatia	Víctor Prieto; Spain
Men's K-22	Mattia Allesina; Italy	Stipe Barić; Croatia	Jordan Fontenay; France
Men's K-30	Eldar Ahmadov; Azerbaijan	Vidadi Khaligov; Azerbaijan	Berkay Uslu; Turkey
Men's K-30	Eldar Ahmadov; Azerbaijan	Vidadi Khaligov; Azerbaijan	Valerio Di Cocco; Italy
Women's K-10	Benedetta Belotti; Italy	Emiliya Mitlinova; Azerbaijan	Veronika Kamenská; Czech Republic
Women's K-10	Benedetta Belotti; Italy	Emiliya Mitlinova; Azerbaijan	Karmen Vask; Estonia
Women's K-21	Olívia Kákosy; Hungary	Lucía Sánchez; Spain	Elise Reedijk; Netherlands
Women's K-21	Olívia Kákosy; Hungary	Lucía Sánchez; Spain	Federica Yakymashko; Italy
Women's K-22	Daniela Topić; Croatia	Tijana Stamenović; Serbia	Andrea Pátkai; Hungary
Women's K-22	Daniela Topić; Croatia	Tijana Stamenović; Serbia	Diandra Bekčič; Slovenia
Women's K-30	Nesrin Cavadzade; Turkey	Julija Karadakić; Croatia	Helen Morrissey-Marsh; England
Women's K-30	Nesrin Cavadzade; Turkey	Julija Karadakić; Croatia	Virginie Boyer; France

=== Medal table ===
* Host nation (Croatia)

Rank	Nation	Gold	Silver	Bronze	Total
1	Italy	2	0	2	4
2	Azerbaijan	1	3	0	4
3	Croatia*	1	2	0	3
4	Spain	1	1	2	4
5	France	1	0	2	3
6	Hungary	1	0	1	2
6	Turkey	1	0	1	2
8	Germany	0	1	1	2
9	Serbia	0	1	0	1
10	Czech Republic	0	0	1	1
10	England	0	0	1	1
10	Estonia	0	0	1	1
10	Netherlands	0	0	1	1
10	Portugal	0	0	1	1
10	Romania	0	0	1	1
10	Slovenia	0	0	1	1
Totals (16 entries)		8	8	16	32

=== Participating nations ===
68 athletes from 18 countries participated:

1. Azerbaijan (5)
2. Croatia (9)
3. Czech Republic (1)
4. England (1)
5. Estonia (1)
6. France (5)
7. Georgia (1)
8. Germany (5)
9. Hungary (12)
10. Italy (6)
11. Netherlands (1)
12. Portugal (2)
13. Romania (1)
14. Serbia (2)
15. Slovenia (1)
16. Spain (6)
17. Turkey (5)
18. Ukraine (4)
