= 2023 European Karate Championships =

Sports competition

2023 European Championships
- Venue: Palacio Multiusos de Guadalajara
- Location: Guadalajara, Spain
- Dates: 22–26 March
- Competitors: 535 from 47 nations

The 2023 European Karate Championships was the 58th edition of the European Karate Championships and 5th European Para Karate Championships and were held in Guadalajara, Spain from 22 to 26 March 2023.

== Medal table ==
* Host nation (Spain)

Rank	Nation	Gold	Silver	Bronze	Total
1	Germany	4	0	2	6
2	Italy	3	2	6	11
3	Ukraine	3	1	0	4
4	France	2	2	3	7
4	Spain*	2	2	3	7
6	Turkey	1	2	7	10
7	Switzerland	1	0	1	2
8	Greece	0	3	2	5
9	Azerbaijan	0	2	2	4
9	Croatia	0	2	2	4
11	Belgium	0	0	1	1
11	Montenegro	0	0	1	1
11	Netherlands	0	0	1	1
11	Sweden	0	0	1	1
Totals (14 entries)		16	16	32	64

== Medalists ==
=== Men ===
Event	Gold	Silver	Bronze
Individual kata	Damián Quintero; Spain	Mattia Busato; Italy	Kutluhan Duran; Turkey
Individual kata	Damián Quintero; Spain	Mattia Busato; Italy	Yuki Ujihara; Switzerland
Team kata	Turkey; Ali Sofuoğlu; Emre Vefa Göktaş; Enes Özdemir; Furkan Kaynar	Spain; Sergio Galán; Óscar García; Alejandro Manzana; Raúl Martín	Montenegro; Arijan Kočan; Vladimir Mijač; Nikola Milić; Kenan Nikočević
Team kata	Turkey; Ali Sofuoğlu; Emre Vefa Göktaş; Enes Özdemir; Furkan Kaynar	Spain; Sergio Galán; Óscar García; Alejandro Manzana; Raúl Martín	Italy; Mattia Busato; Gianluca Gallo; Alessandro Iodice
Kumite −60 kg	Angelo Crescenzo; Italy	Christos-Stefanos Xenos; Greece	Eray Şamdan; Turkey
Kumite −60 kg	Angelo Crescenzo; Italy	Christos-Stefanos Xenos; Greece	Florian Haas; Germany
Kumite −67 kg	Steven Da Costa; France	Dionysios Xenos; Greece	Burak Uygur; Turkey
Kumite −67 kg	Steven Da Costa; France	Dionysios Xenos; Greece	Tural Aghalarzade; Azerbaijan
Kumite −75 kg	Andrii Zaplitnyi; Ukraine	Erman Eltemur; Turkey	Farid Aghayev; Azerbaijan
Kumite −75 kg	Andrii Zaplitnyi; Ukraine	Erman Eltemur; Turkey	Quentin Mahauden; Belgium
Kumite −84 kg	Michele Martina; Italy	Enes Garibović; Croatia	Konstantinos Mastrogiannis; Greece
Kumite −84 kg	Michele Martina; Italy	Enes Garibović; Croatia	Brian Timmermans; Netherlands
Kumite +84 kg	Mehdi Filali; France	Georgios Tzanos; Greece	Babacar Seck; Spain
Kumite +84 kg	Mehdi Filali; France	Georgios Tzanos; Greece	Anđelo Kvesić; Croatia
Team kumite	Ukraine; Valerii Chobotar; Stanislav Horuna; Valerii Sonnykh; Ryzvan Talibov; Andrii Toroshanko; Kostiantyn Tsymbal; Andrii Zaplitnyi	France; Enzo Berthon; Kilian Cizo; Jessie Da Costa; Steven Da Costa; Mehdi Filali; Thanh-Liêm Lê; Younesse Salmi	Croatia; Jakov Bunjevac; Enes Garibović; Anđelo Kvesić; Ivan Kvesić; Ivan Martinac; Ante Mrvičić; Zvonimir Živković
Team kumite	Ukraine; Valerii Chobotar; Stanislav Horuna; Valerii Sonnykh; Ryzvan Talibov; Andrii Toroshanko; Kostiantyn Tsymbal; Andrii Zaplitnyi	France; Enzo Berthon; Kilian Cizo; Jessie Da Costa; Steven Da Costa; Mehdi Filali; Thanh-Liêm Lê; Younesse Salmi	Turkey; Eren Akkurt; Uğur Aktaş; Ömer Faruk Arslan; Enes Bulut; Ömer Abdurrahim Özer; Fatih Şen; Ömer Faruk Yürür

=== Women ===
Event	Gold	Silver	Bronze
Individual kata	Paola García; Spain	Helvétia Taily; France	Terryana D'Onofrio; Italy
Individual kata	Paola García; Spain	Helvétia Taily; France	Dilara Bozan; Turkey
Team kata	Italy; Carola Casale; Terryana D'Onofrio; Noemi Nicosanti	Spain; María López; Lidia Rodríguez; Raquel Roy	France; Maï-Linh Bui; Romane Leitao; Helvétia Taily
Team kata	Italy; Carola Casale; Terryana D'Onofrio; Noemi Nicosanti	Spain; María López; Lidia Rodríguez; Raquel Roy	Turkey; Şule Azra Akbulut; Zehra Kaya; Damla Pelit; Damla Su Türemen
Kumite −50 kg	Shara Hubrich; Germany	Serap Özçelik; Turkey	Erminia Perfetto; Italy
Kumite −50 kg	Shara Hubrich; Germany	Serap Özçelik; Turkey	Nadia Gómez; Spain
Kumite −55 kg	Anzhelika Terliuga; Ukraine	Veronica Brunori; Italy	Tuba Yakan; Turkey
Kumite −55 kg	Anzhelika Terliuga; Ukraine	Veronica Brunori; Italy	Gizem Bugur; Germany
Kumite −61 kg	Reem Khamis; Germany	Anita Serogina; Ukraine	Anna-Johanna Nilsson; Sweden
Kumite −61 kg	Reem Khamis; Germany	Anita Serogina; Ukraine	Konstantina Chrysopoulou; Greece
Kumite −68 kg	Elena Quirici; Switzerland	Irina Zaretska; Azerbaijan	Silvia Semeraro; Italy
Kumite −68 kg	Elena Quirici; Switzerland	Irina Zaretska; Azerbaijan	María Nieto; Spain
Kumite +68 kg	Johanna Kneer; Germany	Farida Aliyeva; Azerbaijan	Nancy Garcia; France
Kumite +68 kg	Johanna Kneer; Germany	Farida Aliyeva; Azerbaijan	Clio Ferracuti; Italy
Team kumite	Germany; Gizem Bugur; Reem Khamis; Johanna Kneer; Madeleine Schröter	Croatia; Sadea Bećirović; Lucija Lesjak; Lea Vukoja; Mia Greta Zorko	Italy; Pamela Bodei; Clio Ferracuti; Alessandra Mangiacapra; Silvia Semeraro
Team kumite	Germany; Gizem Bugur; Reem Khamis; Johanna Kneer; Madeleine Schröter	Croatia; Sadea Bećirović; Lucija Lesjak; Lea Vukoja; Mia Greta Zorko	France; Alizée Agier; Léa Avazeri; Thalya Sombe; Jennifer Zameto

== Participating nations ==
535 athletes from 47 countries participated:

1. Albania (5)
2. Andorra (1)
3. Armenia (5)
4. Austria (12)
5. Azerbaijan (18)
6. Belgium (7)
7. Bosnia and Herzegovina (18)
8. Bulgaria (7)
9. Croatia (26)
10. Cyprus (11)
11. Czech Republic (5)
12. Denmark (11)
13. England (16)
14. Estonia (3)
15. Finland (9)
16. France (24)
17. Georgia (5)
18. Germany (16)
19. Greece (14)
20. Hungary (21)
21. Iceland (1)
22. Ireland (10)
23. Israel (6)
24. Italy (20)
25. Latvia (6)
26. Liechtenstein (3)
27. Lithuania (4)
28. Luxembourg (5)
29. Moldova (2)
30. Montenegro (21)
31. Netherlands (12)
32. North Macedonia (15)
33. Norway (3)
34. Poland (15)
35. Portugal (17)
36. Refugee Karate Team (1)
37. Romania (12)
38. San Marino (1)
39. Scotland (9)
40. Serbia (17)
41. Slovakia (15)
42. Slovenia (13)
43. Spain (23)
44. Sweden (9)
45. Switzerland (11)
46. Turkey (28)
47. Ukraine (22)

== Para Karate ==
Event	Gold	Silver	Bronze
Men's K-10	Dorin Alexe; Romania	Nihat Mammadzada; Azerbaijan	Nohan Dudon; France
Men's K-10	Dorin Alexe; Romania	Nihat Mammadzada; Azerbaijan	Francisco Lozano; Spain
Men's K-21	Carlos Huertas; Spain	Albert Singer; Germany	János Csatári; Hungary
Men's K-21	Carlos Huertas; Spain	Albert Singer; Germany	Michael Lesic; Germany
Men's K-22	Mattia Allesina; Italy	Jordan Fontenay; France	Stipe Barić; Croatia
Men's K-22	Mattia Allesina; Italy	Jordan Fontenay; France	Víctor Prieto; Spain
Men's K-30	Vicente Yángüez; Spain	Eldar Ahmadov; Azerbaijan	Berkay Uslu; Turkey
Men's K-30	Vicente Yángüez; Spain	Eldar Ahmadov; Azerbaijan	Valerio Di Cocco; Italy
Women's K-10	Emiliya Mitlinova; Azerbaijan	Benedetta Belotti; Italy	Veronika Kamenská; Czech Republic
Women's K-10	Emiliya Mitlinova; Azerbaijan	Benedetta Belotti; Italy	Ariana Mitlinova; Azerbaijan
Women's K-21	Olívia Kákosy; Hungary	Lucía Sánchez; Spain	Petra Kárpáti; Hungary
Women's K-21	Olívia Kákosy; Hungary	Lucía Sánchez; Spain	Elise Reedijk; Netherlands
Women's K-22	Daniela Topić; Croatia	Tijana Stamenović; Serbia	Alexandra Szabó; Hungary
Women's K-22	Daniela Topić; Croatia	Tijana Stamenović; Serbia	Andrea Matarí; Spain
Women's K-30	Isabel Fernández; Spain	Knarik Airapetian; Ukraine	Virginie Ballario; France
Women's K-30	Isabel Fernández; Spain	Knarik Airapetian; Ukraine	Nesrin Cavadzade; Turkey

=== Medal table ===
* Host nation (Spain)

Rank	Nation	Gold	Silver	Bronze	Total
1	Spain*	3	1	3	7
2	Azerbaijan	1	2	1	4
3	Italy	1	1	1	3
4	Hungary	1	0	3	4
5	Croatia	1	0	1	2
6	Romania	1	0	0	1
7	France	0	1	2	3
8	Germany	0	1	1	2
9	Serbia	0	1	0	1
9	Ukraine	0	1	0	1
11	Turkey	0	0	2	2
12	Czech Republic	0	0	1	1
12	Netherlands	0	0	1	1
Totals (13 entries)		8	8	16	32

=== Participating nations ===
55 athletes from 17 countries participated:

1. Azerbaijan (4)
2. Croatia (4)
3. Czech Republic (1)
4. England (2)
5. Estonia (1)
6. France (5)
7. Germany (5)
8. Hungary (7)
9. Italy (6)
10. Netherlands (1)
11. Portugal (2)
12. Romania (1)
13. Serbia (2)
14. Slovenia (1)
15. Spain (7)
16. Turkey (3)
17. Ukraine (3)
