= Şule Azra Akbulut =

Turkish karateka

- Born: 2003 (age 22–23); Gaziosmanpaşa, Istanbul, Turkey
- Nationality: Turkish
- Team: Gaziosmanpaşa Belediyespor

Şule Azra Akbulut (born 2003) is a Turkish karateka competing in the kata category.

== Personal life ==
Akbulut was born in 2003. . She is a native of Gaziosmanpaşa in Istanbul. She graduated from Gaziosmanpaşa Anadolu İmam Hatip High School in Istanbul.

== Sports career ==
=== Early years ===
Akbulut started her sports career at the age of eight in 2011 in the Gaziosmanpaşa Belediye Sports Club, and won various medals in the age categories of domestic tournaments. In 2015, she debuted internationally at the 20th Balkan Championships for Children held in Herceg Novi, Montenegro, and won the gold medal in the individual kata event of her age group. In 2016, she took bronze medals in the U13 individual kata event and the U13-U14 team kata event at the 21st Balkan Championships for Children in Belgrade, Serbia. She took the bronze medal with her teammates in the juniors team kata event at the 47th EKF Junior & Cadet and U21 Championships held in Budapest, Hungary in 2020.

=== Senior career ===
She won the bronze medal in the team kata event at the 2023 European Karate Championships in Guadalajara, Spain.
