= 2021 World Karate Championships – Men's +84 kg =

World Karate Championship

Men's kumite +84 kg at the 2021 World Karate Championships
- Venue: Hamdan Sports Complex
- Location: Dubai, United Arab Emirates
- Dates: 16–20 November
- Competitors: 64 from 64 nations

Medalists
| gold medal | Gogita Arkania | Georgia |
| silver medal | Simone Marino | Italy |
| bronze medal | Anđelo Kvesić | Croatia |
| bronze medal | Asiman Gurbanli | Azerbaijan |

The Men's +84 kg competition at the 2021 World Karate Championships was held from 16 to 20 November 2021.

== Results ==
=== Finals ===
Semifinals
(Georgia (country)) Gogita Arkania | 3
(Croatia) Anđelo Kvesić | 1
(Italy) Simone Marino | 2
(Azerbaijan) Asiman Gurbanli | 1

Final
(Georgia (country)) Gogita Arkania | 3
(Italy) Simone Marino | 2

=== Repechage ===
Repechage 1
(Mexico) Miguel Garibay | 0
(Montenegro) Predrag Smolović | 7

Repechage 2
(Montenegro) Predrag Smolović | 0
(Spain) Babacar Seck | 1

Repechage 3
(Spain) Babacar Seck | 1
(United States) Brian Irr | 0

Bronze medal
(Spain) Babacar Seck | 0
(Croatia) Anđelo Kvesić | 5

Repechage 1
(Kazakhstan) Daniyar Yuldashev | 8
(India) Sudhir Sehrawat | 0

Repechage 2
(Kazakhstan) Daniyar Yuldashev | 0
(Chile) Rodrigo Rojas | 5

Repechage 3
(Chile) Rodrigo Rojas | 2
(France) Faadel Boussag | 0

Bronze medal
(Chile) Rodrigo Rojas | 2
(Azerbaijan) Asiman Gurbanli | 5

=== Top half ===
==== Section 1 ====
First round
(Kosovo) Herolind Nishevci | 1
(Serbia) Luka Vuković | 0
(South Africa) Morgan Moss | 1
(Egypt) Hazem Ahmed Mohamed | 0
(Germany) Konstantinos Papastergios | 0
(United States) Brian Irr | 1
(Hong Kong) Lung Tak Yeung | 0
(Hungary) Dániel Molnár | 9
(Georgia (country)) Gogita Arkania | 8
(Mexico) Miguel Garibay | 0
(Montenegro) Predrag Smolović | 0
(Czech Republic) Ondřej Bosák | 0
(Uzbekistan) Ikhtiyorjon Abdulatibov | 0
(Belgium) Luca Costa | 5
(Iraq) Mabast Tawfeeq | 1
(Spain) Babacar Seck | 9

Second round
(Kosovo) Herolind Nishevci | 0
(South Africa) Morgan Moss | 0
(United States) Brian Irr | 1
(Hungary) Dániel Molnár | 0
(Georgia (country)) Gogita Arkania | 1
(Montenegro) Predrag Smolović | 0
(Belgium) Luca Costa | 1
(Spain) Babacar Seck | 4

Third round
(Kosovo) Herolind Nishevci | 1
(United States) Brian Irr | 1
(Georgia (country)) Gogita Arkania | 8
(Spain) Babacar Seck | 0

Quarterfinals
(United States) Brian Irr | 0
(Georgia (country)) Gogita Arkania | 2

==== Section 2 ====
First round
(Greece) Georgios Tzanos | 2
(Democratic Republic of the Congo) Tshiovo Tshipata | 0
(Albania) Blodin Pakashtica | 1
(Kenya) John Kyalo | 0
(Saint Lucia) Karim Sifflet | 0
(Brazil) Giovani Salgado | 6
(Poland) Maciej Gębka | 0
(Saudi Arabia) Tareg Hamedi | 0
(Jordan) Mahmoud Sajan | 4
(Morocco) Mohamed El Bahry | 4
(Chinese Taipei) Chen Yi-an | 1
(Netherlands) Tyron-Darnell Lardy | 4
(Croatia) Anđelo Kvesić | 4
(South Korea) Kim Junh-yeok | 0
(North Macedonia) Zarko Arsovski | 1
(Curaçao) Rob Timmermans | 1

Second round
(Greece) Georgios Tzanos | 0
(Albania) Blodin Pakashtica | 0
(Brazil) Giovani Salgado | 1
(Saudi Arabia) Tareg Hamedi | 5
(Morocco) Mohamed El Bahry | 2
(Netherlands) Tyron-Darnell Lardy | 3
(Croatia) Anđelo Kvesić | 3
(Curaçao) Rob Timmermans | 0

Third round
(Greece) Georgios Tzanos | 3
(Saudi Arabia) Tareg Hamedi | 3
(Netherlands) Tyron-Darnell Lardy | 0
(Croatia) Anđelo Kvesić | 3

Quarterfinals
(Greece) Georgios Tzanos | 1
(Croatia) Anđelo Kvesić | 2

=== Bottom half ===
==== Section 3 ====
First round
(India) Sudhir Sehrawat | 3
(Kuwait) Rasheed Al-Mutairi | 0
(Italy) Simone Marino | 5
(Kazakhstan) Daniyar Yuldashev | 0
(Colombia) Diego Lenis | 0
(Chile) Rodrigo Rojas | 0
(Kyrgyzstan) Adilet Shadykanov | 3
(Israel) Ahmad Abu Bassal | 1
(France) Faadel Boussag | 3
(Tunisia) Houssem Eddine Choiya | 2
(Bulgaria) Roberto Petrov | 0
(Ukraine) Ryzvan Talibov | 5
(Republic of Ireland) Seán McCarthy Crean | 4
(Canada) Alexandre Benjamin Rivest | 2
(Algeria) Hocine Daikhi | 7
(Armenia) Azat Galstyan | 0

Second round
(India) Sudhir Sehrawat | 0
(Italy) Simone Marino | 4
(Chile) Rodrigo Rojas | 1
(Kyrgyzstan) Adilet Shadykanov | 0
(France) Faadel Boussag | 4
(Ukraine) Ryzvan Talibov | 2
(Republic of Ireland) Seán McCarthy Crean | 6
(Algeria) Hocine Daikhi | 4

Third round
(Italy) Simone Marino | 2
(Chile) Rodrigo Rojas | 0
(France) Faadel Boussag | 4
(Republic of Ireland) Seán McCarthy Crean | 0

Quarterfinals
(Italy) Simone Marino | 1
(France) Faadel Boussag | 0

==== Section 4 ====
First round
(Slovakia) Tomáš Kósa | 0
(United Arab Emirates) Sulaiman Al-Mulla | 0
Maksim Sachkov | 0
(Bosnia and Herzegovina) Edin Šarić | 0
(Ecuador) Yeiro Mina | 1
(Australia) Daniel Tielen | 3
(Turkmenistan) Perman Işanow | 0
(Denmark) Christian Godthjælp Petersen | 1
(Romania) Vlad Rizea | 2
(Cyprus) Mathaios Stylianou | 1
(Latvia) Andrejs Ozerovs | 3
(Bangladesh) Muhammad Ramzan | 1
(Azerbaijan) Asiman Gurbanli | 3
(Turkey) Rıdvan Kaptan | 0
(Belarus) Aliaksei Vodchyts | 1
(Japan) Daiki Ando | 1

Second round
(United Arab Emirates) Sulaiman Al-Mulla | 5
Maksim Sachkov | 6
(Australia) Daniel Tielen | 1
(Denmark) Christian Godthjælp Petersen | 2
(Romania) Vlad Rizea | 1
(Latvia) Andrejs Ozerovs | 4
(Azerbaijan) Asiman Gurbanli | 0
(Belarus) Aliaksei Vodchyts | 0

Third round
Maksim Sachkov | 2
(Denmark) Christian Godthjælp Petersen | 4
(Latvia) Andrejs Ozerovs | 0
(Azerbaijan) Asiman Gurbanli | 8

Quarterfinals
(Denmark) Christian Godthjælp Petersen | 1
(Azerbaijan) Asiman Gurbanli | 2
