= Enzo Berthon =

French karateka (born 2000)

Personal information
- Born: 10 April 2000 (age 26)

Sport
- Country: France
- Sport: Karate
- Events: Kumite; Team kumite
Medal record
Men's karate
Representing France
World Games
Gold medal – first place	2025 Chengdu	Kumite 75 kg
World Championships
Bronze medal – third place	2023 Budapest	Team kumite
European Championships
Gold medal – first place	2022 Gaziantep	Team kumite
Silver medal – second place	2023 Guadalajara	Team kumite
Bronze medal – third place	2024 Zadar	Team kumite
Bronze medal – third place	2025 Yerevan	Team kumite

Enzo Berthon (born 10 April 2000) is a French karateka. He won the gold medal in the men's kumite 75 kg event at the 2025 World Games held in Chengdu, China.

== Achievements ==
Year	Competition	Venue	Rank	Event
2022	European Championships	Gaziantep, Turkey	1st	Team kumite
2023	European Championships	Guadalajara, Spain	2nd	Team kumite
2023	World Championships	Budapest, Hungary	3rd	Team kumite
2024	European Championships	Zadar, Croatia	3rd	Team kumite
2025	European Championships	Yerevan, Armenia	3rd	Team kumite
2025	World Games	Chengdu, China	1st	Kumite 75 kg
