= Karate at the 2025 World Games – Men's kumite 75 kg =

Men's kumite 75 kg at the 2025 World Games
- Venue: Jianyang Cultural and Sports Centre Gymnasium
- Location: Chengdu, China
- Dates: 9 August
- Competitors: 8 from 8 nations

Medalists
| gold medal | Enzo Berthon | France |
| silver medal | Yusei Sakiyama | Japan |
| bronze medal | Abdalla Abdelaziz | Egypt |

The men's kumite 75 kg competition in karate at the 2025 World Games took place on 9 August 2025 at the Jianyang Cultural and Sports Centre Gymnasium in Chengdu, China.

== Results ==
=== Pool round ===
==== Pool A ====
| Pos | Athlete | B | W | D | D^{0} | L | Pts | Score | (France) | (Japan) | (China) | (Ukraine) |
|---|---|---|---|---|---|---|---|---|---|---|---|---|
| 1 | Enzo Berthon (FRA) | 3 | 2 | 0 | 0 | 1 | 6 (Note: Berthon (FRA) 5–4 Sakiyama (JPN)) | 11–7 | — | 5–4 | 6–2 | 0–1 |
| 2 | Yusei Sakiyama (JPN) | 3 | 2 | 0 | 0 | 1 | 6 | 10–7 | 4–5 | — | 5–2 | 1–0 |
| 3 | Xu Junbo (CHN) | 3 | 1 | 0 | 0 | 2 | 3 (Note: Xu (CHN) 2–0 Zaplitnyi (UKR)) | 6–11 | 2–6 | 2–5 | — | 2–0 |
| 4 | Andrii Zaplitnyi (UKR) | 3 | 1 | 0 | 0 | 2 | 3 | 1–3 | 1–0 | 0–1 | 0–2 | — |

Source: Chengdu 2025

==== Pool B ====
| Pos | Athlete | B | W | D | D^{0} | L | Pts | Score | (Kazakhstan) | (Egypt) | (Hungary) | (Australia) |
|---|---|---|---|---|---|---|---|---|---|---|---|---|
| 1 | Nurkanat Azhikanov (KAZ) | 3 | 2 | 0 | 0 | 1 | 6 (Note: Azhikanov (KAZ) 7–7 Abdelaziz (EGY)) | 15–17 | — | 7–7 | 4–4 | 4–6 |
| 2 | Abdalla Abdelaziz (EGY) | 3 | 2 | 0 | 0 | 1 | 6 | 20–9 | 7–7 | — | 6–1 | 7–1 |
| 3 | Gábor Hárspataki (HUN) | 3 | 1 | 0 | 0 | 2 | 3 (Note: Hárspataki (HUN) 4–4 Durham (AUS)) | 9–14 | 4–4 | 1–6 | — | 4–4 |
| 4 | Mitchell Durham (AUS) | 3 | 1 | 0 | 0 | 2 | 3 | 11–15 | 6–4 | 1–7 | 4–4 | — |

Source: Chengdu 2025

=== Finals ===
Semi-finals
Abdalla Abdelaziz (EGY) | 3
Enzo Berthon (FRA) | 5
Yusei Sakiyama (JPN) | 11
Nurkanat Azhikanov (KAZ) | 3

Gold medal bout
Enzo Berthon (FRA) | 3
Yusei Sakiyama (JPN) | 1
Bronze medal bout
Abdalla Abdelaziz (EGY) | 5
Nurkanat Azhikanov (KAZ) | 3
