= Simone Marino =

Italian karateka (born 1996)

Personal information
- Born: 8 December 1996 (age 29)

Sport
- Country: Italy
- Sport: Karate
- Weight class: +84 kg
- Events: Kumite; Team kumite
Medal record
Men's karate
Representing Italy
World Championships
Gold medal – first place	2021 Dubai	Team kumite
Silver medal – second place	2021 Dubai	Kumite +84 kg
Bronze medal – third place	2018 Madrid	Team kumite
Bronze medal – third place	2023 Budapest	Team kumite
European Championships
Gold medal – first place	2017 İzmit	Kumite +84 kg
Gold medal – first place	2025 Yerevan	Team kumite

Simone Marino (born 8 December 1996) is an Italian karateka. He won the silver medal in the men's +84 kg event at the 2021 World Karate Championships held in Dubai, United Arab Emirates. In 2017, he won the gold medal in the men's +84 kg event at the European Karate Championships held in İzmit, Turkey.

At the 2018 Mediterranean Games held in Tarragona, Spain, he competed in the men's kumite +84 kg event.
