= 2026 European Karate Championships – Men's team kumite =

Men's team kumite at the 2026 European Karate Championships
- Venue: Eissporthalle Frankfurt
- Location: Frankfurt, Germany
- Dates: 21–24 May
- Nations: 26
- Teams: 26

Medalists
gold medal	Matteo Avanzini; Michele Ciani; Daniele De Vivo; Matteo Fiore; Luca Maresca; Michele Martina; Lorenzo Pietromarchi; Christian Sabatino	Italy
silver medal	Eren Akkurt; Uğur Aktaş; Hasan Arslan; Enes Bulut; Kadir Furkan Genç; Umut Eren Gündoğ; Yusuf Eren Temizel; Ömer Faruk Yürür	Turkey
bronze medal	Davit Davituri; Anzor Donadze; Merabi Gelashvili; Valiko Poniava; Tsotne Sordia; Ika Sulamanidze; Nika Tolordava	Georgia
bronze medal	Gadzhi Gadzhiev; Eduard Gasparian; Makar Golovin; Konstantin Kokovurov; Iurik Ogannisian; Ernest Sharafutdinov

The men's team kumite competition at the 2026 European Karate Championships was held from 21 to 24 May 2026.

== Results ==
=== Finals ===
Semifinals
Turkey	3
Georgia	2
Montenegro	0
Italy	3

Final
Turkey	0
Italy	3

=== Repechage ===
Repechage 1
Germany	2
France	3

Repechage 2
France	3
Scotland	1

Bronze medal
France	0
Georgia	3

Repechage
EKF-1	3
EKF-2	1

Bronze medal
EKF-1	3
Montenegro	1

=== Top half ===
==== Section 1 ====
Round of 32
Spain	2
Azerbaijan	3
Finland	1
Scotland	3
Germany	0
Turkey	3

Round of 16
Azerbaijan	2
Scotland	3
Turkey	3
France	2

Quarterfinals
Scotland	0
Turkey	3

==== Section 2 ====
Round of 32
Serbia	3
Switzerland	0
Georgia	3
Netherlands	0

Round of 16
Serbia	2
Bosnia and Herzegovina	2
Georgia	3
Croatia	0

Quarterfinals
Bosnia and Herzegovina	1
Georgia	3

=== Bottom half ===
==== Section 3 ====
Round of 32
Denmark	3
Cyprus	1
Slovakia	2
North Macedonia	2
Montenegro	3
Albania	0

Round of 16
Denmark	0
North Macedonia	3
Montenegro	3
Greece	1

Quarterfinals
North Macedonia	2
Montenegro	3

==== Section 4 ====
Round of 32
Kosovo	2
EKF-2	3
Ireland	0
EKF-1	3

Round of 16
EKF-2	3
Ukraine	2
EKF-1	2
Italy	3

Quarterfinals
EKF-2	2
Italy	3
