= 2025 European Karate Championships =

Karate tournament

2025 European Championships
- Venue: Karen Demirchyan Complex
- Location: Yerevan, Armenia
- Dates: 7–11 May
- Competitors: 558 from 46 nations

The 2025 European Karate Championships is the 60th edition of the European Karate Championships and was held in Yerevan, Armenia from 7 to 11 May 2025. Russian and Belarusian karate athletes participated in the tournament as part of the European Karate Federation.

== Event videos ==
Broadcasting
7 May 2025 Tatami 1	7 May 2025 Tatami 2	7 May 2025 Tatami 3	7 May 2025 Tatami 4
8 May 2025 Tatami 1	8 May 2025 Tatami 2	8 May 2025 Tatami 3	8 May 2025 Tatami 4
9 May 2025 Tatami 1	9 May 2025 Tatami 2	9 May 2025 Tatami 3	9 May 2025 Tatami 4
10 May 2025 Finals	10 May 2025 Finals	10 May 2025 Finals	
11 May 2025 Finals

== Medal table ==
* Host nation (Armenia)

Rank	Nation	Gold	Silver	Bronze	Total
1	Germany	3	0	4	7
2	Italy	2	2	4	8
3	Spain	2	2	2	6
4	Croatia	2	2	1	5
–	European Karate Federation-1	2	1	1	4
5	Turkey	2	0	2	4
6	France	1	2	3	6
7	Ukraine	1	2	2	5
8	Greece	1	0	2	3
9	Montenegro	0	1	3	4
10	Latvia	0	1	1	2
11	Albania	0	1	0	1
11	Luxembourg	0	1	0	1
11	Portugal	0	1	0	1
14	Armenia*	0	0	2	2
14	Kosovo	0	0	2	2
16	Bulgaria	0	0	1	1
16	Sweden	0	0	1	1
16	Switzerland	0	0	1	1
Totals (18 entries)		16	16	32	64

== Medalists ==
=== Men ===
Event	Gold	Silver	Bronze
Individual kata	Enes Özdemir; Turkey	Raúl Martín; Spain	Vladimir Mijač; Montenegro
Individual kata	Enes Özdemir; Turkey	Raúl Martín; Spain	Alessio Ghinami; Italy
Team kata	Spain; Raúl Martín; Salvador Balbuena; Iván Martín; Alejandro Galán	Italy; Alessio Ghinami; Gianluca Gallo; Mattia Busato; Alessandro Iodice	France; Lucas Hoffmann; Tom Peltier; Mahel Stassiaux; Gaëtan Coutière
Team kata	Spain; Raúl Martín; Salvador Balbuena; Iván Martín; Alejandro Galán	Italy; Alessio Ghinami; Gianluca Gallo; Mattia Busato; Alessandro Iodice	Turkey; Enes Özdemir; Emre Vefa Göktaş; Hüseyin Can Göksu
Kumite −60 kg	Akhmed Akhmedov; European Karate Federation-1	Orges Arifi; Albania	Balša Vojinović; Montenegro
Kumite −60 kg	Akhmed Akhmedov; European Karate Federation-1	Orges Arifi; Albania	Yura Zalyan; Armenia
Kumite −67 kg	Ömer Abdurrahim Özer; Turkey	Iurik Ogannisian; European Karate Federation-1	Nenad Dulović; Montenegro
Kumite −67 kg	Ömer Abdurrahim Özer; Turkey	Iurik Ogannisian; European Karate Federation-1	Muhammed Özdemir; Germany
Kumite −75 kg	Ernest Sharafutdinov; European Karate Federation-1	Nemanja Mikulić; Montenegro	Betim Maliqi; Kosovo
Kumite −75 kg	Ernest Sharafutdinov; European Karate Federation-1	Nemanja Mikulić; Montenegro	Konstantinos Zygouris; Greece
Kumite −84 kg	Ivan Kvesić; Croatia	Valerii Chobotar; Ukraine	Janne Haubold; Germany
Kumite −84 kg	Ivan Kvesić; Croatia	Valerii Chobotar; Ukraine	Gor Nersisyan; Armenia
Kumite +84 kg	Mehdi Filali; France	Anđelo Kvesić; Croatia	Ryzvan Talibov; Ukraine
Kumite +84 kg	Mehdi Filali; France	Anđelo Kvesić; Croatia	Matteo Avanzini; Italy
Team kumite	Italy; Luca Maresca; Angelo Crescenzo; Matteo Fiore; Daniele De Vivo; Matteo Avanzini; Michele Martina; Simone Marino	Croatia; Ivan Martinac; Boran Berak; Ivan Kvesić; Anđelo Kvesić; Dino Šimunec; Ivan Pehar; Toma Mileta; Mislav Plesivčak	Greece; Ilias Psomas; Konstantinos Mastrogiannis; Georgios Baliotis; Konstantinos Zygouris; Athanasios Nikopoulos; Christos-Stefanos Xenos; Nikolaos Moraitis
Team kumite	Italy; Luca Maresca; Angelo Crescenzo; Matteo Fiore; Daniele De Vivo; Matteo Avanzini; Michele Martina; Simone Marino	Croatia; Ivan Martinac; Boran Berak; Ivan Kvesić; Anđelo Kvesić; Dino Šimunec; Ivan Pehar; Toma Mileta; Mislav Plesivčak	France; Ryan Gari; Ilies Elguir; Issa Lardjoum; Kilian Cizo; Enzo Berthon; Mehdi Filali; Younesse Salmi; Thanh-Liêm Lê

=== Women ===
Event	Gold	Silver	Bronze
Individual kata	Terryana D'Onofrio; Italy	Helvétia Taily; France	Dilara Bozan; Turkey
Individual kata	Terryana D'Onofrio; Italy	Helvétia Taily; France	Paola García; Spain
Team kata	Spain; Paola García; Carla Guardeño; Irene Carrión; Sara Tabuenca	Portugal; Ana Sofia Cruz; Natacha Fernandes; Maisa Caridade; Beatriz Portal	Italy; Terryana D'Onofrio; Michela Rizzo; Elena Roversi; Orsola D'Onofrio
Team kata	Spain; Paola García; Carla Guardeño; Irene Carrión; Sara Tabuenca	Portugal; Ana Sofia Cruz; Natacha Fernandes; Maisa Caridade; Beatriz Portal	France; Maï-Linh Bui; Marie Bui; Léa Severan
Kumite −50 kg	Ema Sgardelli; Croatia	Erminia Perfetto; Italy	Aleksandra Mihailova; Latvia
Kumite −50 kg	Ema Sgardelli; Croatia	Erminia Perfetto; Italy	Shara Hubrich; Germany
Kumite −55 kg	Mia Bitsch; Germany	Jennifer Warling; Luxembourg	Ivet Goranova; Bulgaria
Kumite −55 kg	Mia Bitsch; Germany	Jennifer Warling; Luxembourg	Anna Chernysheva; European Karate Federation-1
Kumite −61 kg	Oleksandra Soholova; Ukraine	Beata Girvica; Latvia	Anna-Johanna Nilsson; Sweden
Kumite −61 kg	Oleksandra Soholova; Ukraine	Beata Girvica; Latvia	Anastasiia Semenenko; Germany
Kumite −68 kg	Hannah Riedel; Germany	María Nieto; Spain	Elina Sieliemienieva; Ukraine
Kumite −68 kg	Hannah Riedel; Germany	María Nieto; Spain	Elena Quirici; Switzerland
Kumite +68 kg	Kyriaki Kydonaki; Greece	Dariia Bulay; Ukraine	Nikolina Golomboš; Croatia
Kumite +68 kg	Kyriaki Kydonaki; Greece	Dariia Bulay; Ukraine	María Torres; Spain
Team kumite	Germany; Johanna Kneer; Shara Hubrich; Mia Bitsch; Hannah Riedel; Madeleine Schröter	France; Thalya Sombe; Sydney Yvon; Natanaële Flamand; Clémence Péa; Jenna Touvrey	Italy; Viola Lallo; Silvia Semeraro; Clio Ferracuti; Veronica Brunori; Sofia Ferrarini
Team kumite	Germany; Johanna Kneer; Shara Hubrich; Mia Bitsch; Hannah Riedel; Madeleine Schröter	France; Thalya Sombe; Sydney Yvon; Natanaële Flamand; Clémence Péa; Jenna Touvrey	Kosovo; Elmedina Istogu; Vlera Qerimi; Fortesa Orana; Behije Mustafa

== Participating nations ==
558 athletes from 46 countries participated:

1. Albania (5)
2. Andorra (1)
3. Armenia (13)
4. Austria (10)
5. Belgium (7)
6. Bosnia and Herzegovina (21)
7. Bulgaria (5)
8. Croatia (24)
9. Cyprus (9)
10. Czech Republic (14)
11. Denmark (12)
12. England (16)
13. Estonia (2)
14. Finland (7)
15. France (27)
16. Georgia (16)
17. Germany (22)
18. Greece (16)
19. Hungary (12)
20. Iceland (3)
21. European Karate Federation – 1 (Russia) (12)
22. European Karate Federation – 2 (Belarus) (10)
23. Ireland (5)
24. Israel (5)
25. Italy (21)
26. Kosovo (12)
27. Latvia (7)
28. Lithuania (4)
29. Luxembourg (3)
30. Malta (3)
31. Moldova (2)
32. North Macedonia (15)
33. Montenegro (22)
34. Netherlands (10)
35. Norway (7)
36. Poland (11)
37. Portugal (14)
38. Refugee Karate Team (1)
39. Romania (11)
40. San Marino (1)
41. Scotland (8)
42. Serbia (21)
43. Slovakia (15)
44. Slovenia (5)
45. Spain (22)
46. Sweden (9)
47. Switzerland (15)
48. Turkey (26)
49. Ukraine (19)

== Para Karate ==
Event	Gold	Silver	Bronze
Men's K-10	Nohan Dudon; France	Dorin Alexe; Romania	Josip Steko; Croatia
Men's K-10	Nohan Dudon; France	Dorin Alexe; Romania	Alexei Nurkenov; European Karate Federation-1
Men's K-21	Carlos Huertas; Spain	Albert Singer; Germany	Mike Richter; Germany
Men's K-21	Carlos Huertas; Spain	Albert Singer; Germany	António Pereira; Portugal
Men's K-22	Mattia Allesina; Italy	Stipe Barić; Croatia	Patrick Buwalda; Italy
Men's K-22	Mattia Allesina; Italy	Stipe Barić; Croatia	Jordan Fontenay; France
Men's K-30	Berkay Uslu; Turkey	Alexandre Schoegel; France	Airat Urazaev; European Karate Federation-1
Men's K-30	Berkay Uslu; Turkey	Alexandre Schoegel; France	Pietro Merlo; Italy
Women's K-10	Veronika Kamenská; Czech Republic	None awarded	None awarded
Women's K-21	Olívia Kákosy; Hungary	Lucía Sánchez; Spain	Elise Reedijk; Netherlands
Women's K-21	Olívia Kákosy; Hungary	Lucía Sánchez; Spain	Federica Yakymashko; Italy
Women's K-22	Daniela Topić; Croatia	Diandra Bekčič; Slovenia	Maria Matari; Spain
Women's K-22	Daniela Topić; Croatia	Diandra Bekčič; Slovenia	Zina Szőke; Hungary
Women's K-30	Nesrin Cavadzade; Turkey	Knarik Airapetian; Ukraine	Virginie Boyer; France
Women's K-30	Nesrin Cavadzade; Turkey	Knarik Airapetian; Ukraine	Helen Morrissey-Marsh; England

=== Medal table ===
* Host nation (Armenia)

Rank	Nation	Gold	Silver	Bronze	Total
1	Turkey	2	0	0	2
2	France	1	1	2	4
3	Croatia	1	1	1	3
3	Spain	1	1	1	3
5	Italy	1	0	3	4
6	Hungary	1	0	1	2
7	Czech Republic	1	0	0	1
8	Germany	0	1	1	2
9	Romania	0	1	0	1
9	Slovenia	0	1	0	1
9	Ukraine	0	1	0	1
–	European Karate Federation-1	0	0	2	2
12	England	0	0	1	1
12	Netherlands	0	0	1	1
12	Portugal	0	0	1	1
Totals (14 entries)		8	7	14	29
