= Giovani Salgado =

Brazilian karateka (born 2001)

Personal information
- Born: 8 May 2001 (age 25) Caçapava, São Paulo, Brazil

Sport
- Country: Brazil
- Sport: Karate
- Weight class: 84 kg
- Event: Kumite
Medal record
Men's karate
Representing Brazil
Pan American Games
Bronze medal – third place	2023 Santiago	Kumite +84 kg
Pan American Championship
Bronze medal – third place	2022 Curaçao	Kumite +84 kg
Junior Pan American Games
Gold medal – first place	2021 Cali-Valle	Kumite +84 kg

Giovani Felipin Salgado (born 8 May 2001) is a Brazilian karateka.

== Career ==
At the 2021 World Karate Championships held in Dubai, Salgado won his first fight, but was eliminated in the 2nd round.

At the 2021 Junior Pan American Games held in Cali, Colombia, he won a gold medal in the Men's +84 kg category.

At the 2022 Pan American Karate Championships held in Curaçao, he obtained a bronze in the +84 kg category.

At the 2023 World Karate Championships held in Budapest, Hungary, he almost won a medal, reaching the semi-final but losing the fight, and then the bronze medal match, in the Men's +84 kg category.

At the 2023 Pan American Games held in Santiago, Chile, he won a bronze medal in the +84 kg category.
