= Matteo Avanzini =

Italian karateka

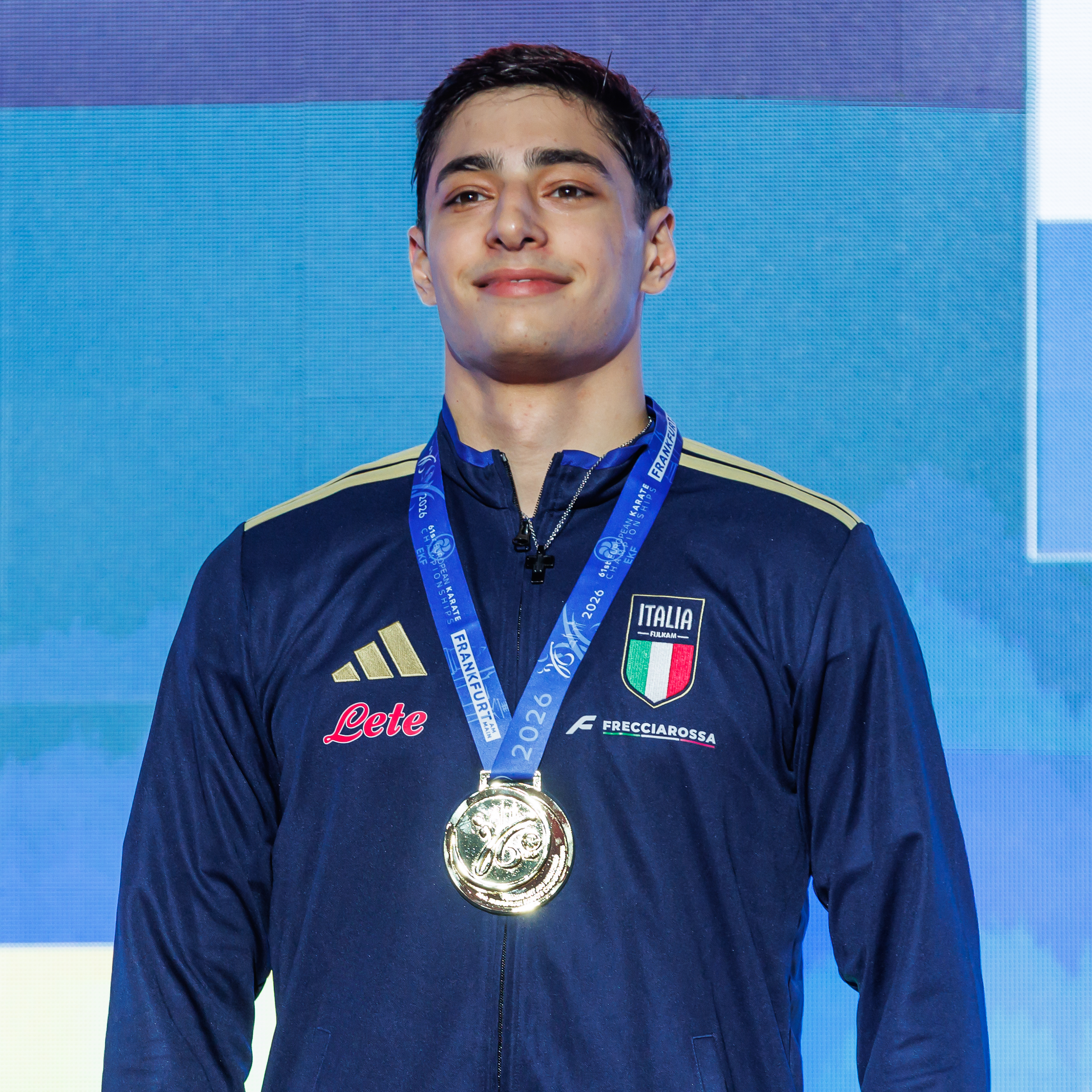

Sport
- Country: Italy
- Sport: Karate
- Weight class: +84 kg
- Events: Kumite; Team kumite
Medal record
Men's karate
Representing Italy
World Championships
Gold medal – first place	2025 Cairo	Kumite +84 kg
Bronze medal – third place	2023 Budapest	Team kumite
European Championships
Gold medal – first place	2024 Zadar	Team kumite
Gold medal – first place	2025 Yerevan	Team kumite
Gold medal – first place	2026 Frankfurt	Kumite +84 kg
Gold medal – first place	2026 Frankfurt	Team kumite
Silver medal – second place	2024 Zadar	Kumite +84 kg
Bronze medal – third place	2025 Yerevan	Kumite +84 kg

Matteo Avanzini is an Italian karateka. He is a three-time medalist in the men's +84 kg event at the European Karate Championships. He is also a three-time gold medalist in the men's team kumite event at this competition.

== Achievements ==
Year	Competition	Venue	Rank	Event
2023	World Championships	Budapest, Hungary	3rd	Team kumite
2024	European Championships	Zadar, Croatia	1st	Team kumite
2024	European Championships	Zadar, Croatia	2nd	Kumite +84 kg
2025	European Championships	Yerevan, Armenia	3rd	Kumite +84 kg
2025	European Championships	Yerevan, Armenia	1st	Team kumite
2025	World Championships	Cairo, Egypt	1st	Kumite +84 kg
2026	European Championships	Frankfurt, Germany	1st	Kumite +84 kg
2026	European Championships	Frankfurt, Germany	1st	Team kumite
