= Anđelo Kvesić =

Croatian karateka (born 1995)

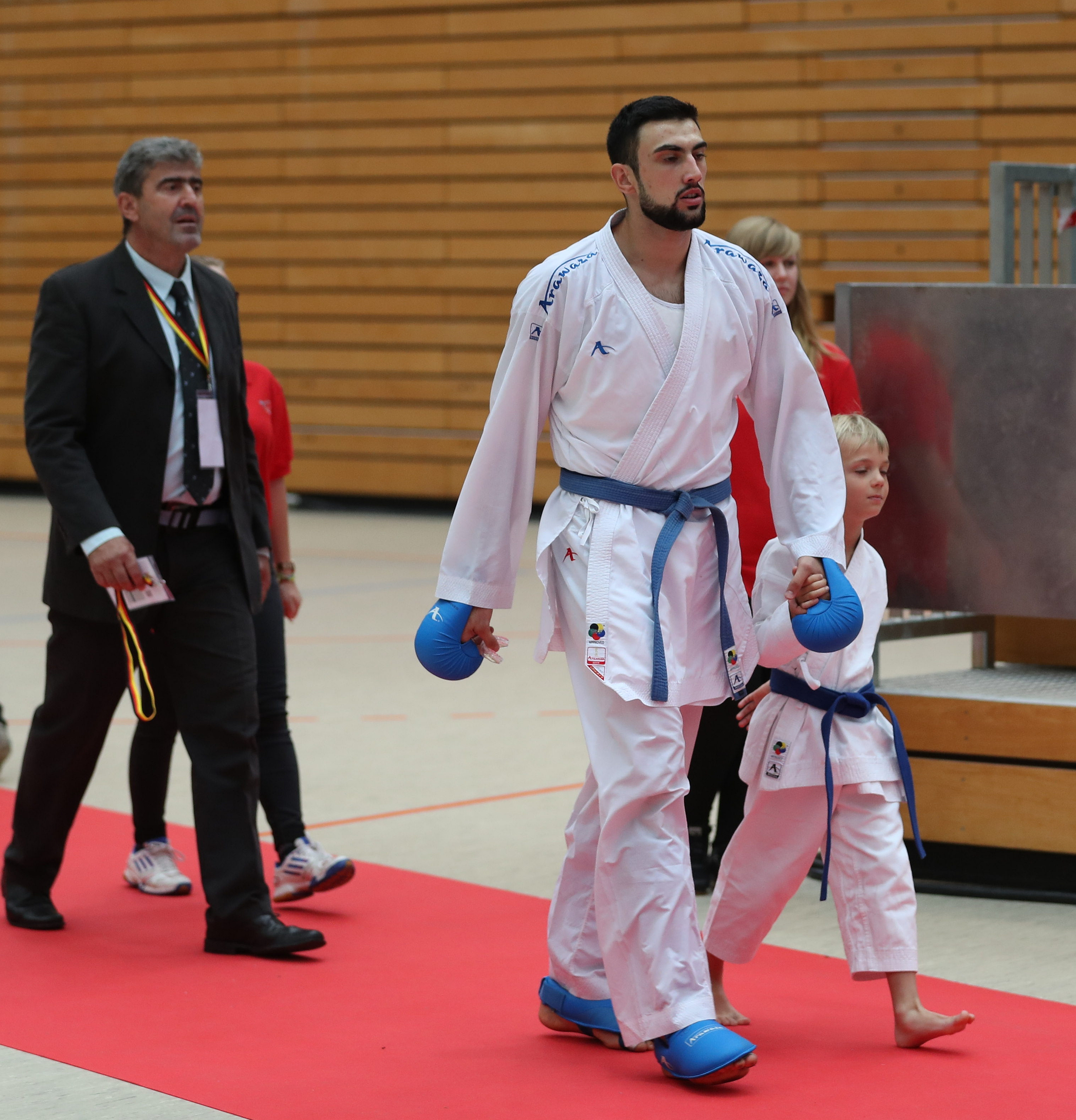
- Kvesić in 2018

Personal information
- Born: 8 June 1995 (age 31)

Sport
- Country: Croatia
- Sport: Karate
- Weight class: +84 kg
- Events: Kumite; Team kumite
Medal record
Men's karate
Representing Croatia
World Championships
Bronze medal – third place	2016 Linz	Kumite +84 kg
Bronze medal – third place	2021 Dubai	Kumite +84 kg
World Games
Silver medal – second place	2022 Birmingham	Kumite +84 kg
Silver medal – second place	2025 Chengdu	Kumite +84 kg
European Games
Gold medal – first place	2023 Kraków-Małopolska	Kumite +84 kg
Silver medal – second place	2019 Minsk	Kumite +84 kg
European Championships
Gold medal – first place	2021 Poreč	Team kumite
Gold medal – first place	2022 Gaziantep	Kumite +84 kg
Gold medal – first place	2024 Zadar	Kumite +84 kg
Silver medal – second place	2025 Yerevan	Kumite +84 kg
Silver medal – second place	2025 Yerevan	Team kumite
Bronze medal – third place	2017 İzmit	Team kumite
Bronze medal – third place	2019 Guadalajara	Kumite +84 kg
Bronze medal – third place	2019 Guadalajara	Team kumite
Bronze medal – third place	2023 Guadalajara	Kumite +84 kg
Bronze medal – third place	2023 Guadalajara	Team kumite
Bronze medal – third place	2026 Frankfurt	Kumite +84 kg
Mediterranean Games
Gold medal – first place	2022 Oran	Kumite +84 kg
Silver medal – second place	2026 Taranto	Kumite +84 kg

Anđelo Kvesić (born 8 June 1995) is a Croatian karateka. He is a two-time gold medalist in the men's +84 kg event at the European Karate Championships. He is a two-time bronze medalist in his event at the World Karate Championships and a two-time medalist, including gold, at the European Games.

== Career ==
In 2017, Kvesić competed in the men's kumite +84 kg event at the World Games held in Wrocław, Poland. He was eliminated in the elimination round.

Kvesić won the silver medal in the men's kumite +84 kg event at the 2019 European Games held in Minsk, Belarus. In 2021, he won one of the bronze medals in the men's +84 kg event at the World Karate Championships held in Dubai, United Arab Emirates.

Kvesić won the gold medal in the men's kumite +84 kg event at the 2022 European Karate Championships held in Gaziantep, Turkey. He won the gold medal in the men's +84 kg event at the 2022 Mediterranean Games held in Oran, Algeria. In the final, he defeated Hocine Daikhi of Algeria. He won the silver medal in the men's kumite +84 kg event at the 2022 World Games held in Birmingham, United States.

Kvesić won one of the bronze medals in the men's +84 kg event at the 2023 European Karate Championships held in Guadalajara, Spain. He also won one of the bronze medals in the men's team kumite event. A few months later, he won the gold medal in his event at the 2023 European Games held in Poland. During the gold medal match, his opponent Fatih Şen of Turkey was disqualified and no silver medal was awarded.

He won the gold medal in the men's +84 kg event at the 2024 European Karate Championships held in Zadar, Croatia. Kvesić won the silver medal in his event at the 2025 European Karate Championships held in Yerevan, Armenia. He also won the silver medal in the men's team kumite event.

== Personal life ==
His brother Ivan Kvesić also competes in karate.

== Achievements ==
Year	Competition	Location	Rank	Event
2016	World Championships	Linz, Austria	3rd	Kumite +84 kg
2017	European Championships	İzmit, Turkey	3rd	Team kumite
2019	European Championships	Guadalajara, Spain	3rd	Kumite +84 kg
2019	European Championships	Guadalajara, Spain	3rd	Team kumite
2019	European Games	Minsk, Belarus	2nd	Kumite +84 kg
2021	European Championships	Poreč, Croatia	1st	Team kumite
2021	World Championships	Dubai, United Arab Emirates	3rd	Kumite +84 kg
2022	European Championships	Gaziantep, Turkey	1st	Kumite +84 kg
2022	Mediterranean Games	Oran, Algeria	1st	Kumite +84 kg
2022	World Games	Birmingham, United States	2nd	Kumite +84 kg
2023	European Championships	Guadalajara, Spain	3rd	Kumite +84 kg
2023	European Championships	Guadalajara, Spain	3rd	Team kumite
2023	European Games	Kraków and Małopolska, Poland	1st	Kumite +84 kg
2024	European Championships	Zadar, Croatia	1st	Kumite +84 kg
2025	European Championships	Yerevan, Armenia	2nd	Kumite +84 kg
2025	European Championships	Yerevan, Armenia	2nd	Team kumite
2025	World Games	Chengdu, China	2nd	Kumite +84 kg
