= Mehdi Filali =

French karateka (born 1999)

Personal information
- Born: 5 July 1999 (age 26)

Sport
- Country: France
- Sport: Karate
- Weight class: +84 kg
- Events: Kumite; Team kumite
Medal record
Men's karate
Representing France
World Championships
Gold medal – first place	2023 Budapest	Kumite +84 kg
European Championships
Gold medal – first place	2022 Gaziantep	Team kumite
Gold medal – first place	2023 Guadalajara	Kumite +84 kg
Gold medal – first place	2025 Yerevan	Kumite +84 kg
Silver medal – second place	2023 Guadalajara	Team kumite
Bronze medal – third place	2024 Zadar	Team kumite
Bronze medal – third place	2024 Zadar	Kumite +84 kg
Bronze medal – third place	2025 Yerevan	Team kumite

Mehdi Filali (born 5 July 1999) is a French karateka. He won the gold medal in the men's +84 kg event at the 2023 World Karate Championships held in Budapest, Hungary. He is also a two-time gold medalist in this event at the European Karate Championships (2023 and 2025).

Filali also competes in the Karate1 Premier League.

== Achievements ==
Year	Competition	Location	Rank	Event
2022	European Championships	Gaziantep, Turkey	1st	Team kumite
2023	European Championships	Guadalajara, Spain	1st	Kumite +84 kg
2023	European Championships	Guadalajara, Spain	2nd	Team kumite
2023	World Championships	Budapest, Hungary	1st	Kumite +84 kg
2024	European Championships	Zadar, Croatia	3rd	Kumite +84 kg
2024	European Championships	Zadar, Croatia	3rd	Team kumite
2025	European Championships	Yerevan, Armenia	1st	Kumite +84 kg
2025	European Championships	Yerevan, Armenia	3rd	Team kumite
