= 2018 World Karate Championships – Men's team kumite =

Karate competition

Men's team kumite at the 2018 World Karate Championships
- Location: Madrid, Spain
- Dates: 8-11 November

The first round of the Men's team kumite competition at the 2018 World Karate Championships was held on November 8, 2018, the preliminaries and repechages on November 9 and the finals on November 11, 2018.

== Results ==
=== Finals ===
Semi-finals
Azerbaijan
Turkey
Italy	0
Iran	3

Final
Turkey	2
Iran	3

=== Repechage ===
Repechage round 1
Saudi Arabia	3
Peru	0

Repechage round 2
Saudi Arabia	0
Japan	2
Armenia	0
Senegal	3

Repechage round 3
Japan	3
Macedonia	0
Senegal	3
Jordan	0

Bronze medals
Japan
Azerbaijan
Senegal	0
Italy	3

=== Pool A ===
First round
Canada	1
Latvia	3
India	0
Belarus	3
Dominican Republic	1
Spain	3
Panama	1
Egypt	3
Ukraine	3
Costa Rica	0

Second round
Latvia	0
Belarus	3
Spain	1
Azerbaijan	3
Egypt	3
England	1
Ukraine	3
France	1

Third round
Belarus	1
Azerbaijan	2
Egypt	3
Ukraine	2

Quarterfinals
Azerbaijan	3
Egypt	1

=== Pool B ===
First round
Lithuania	0
Brazil	3
Israel	3
Angola	1
Turkey	3
Saudi Arabia	0
Belgium	3
Ireland	0

Second round
Brazil	3
Finland	0
Israel	0
Macedonia	3
Turkey	3
Peru	0
Belgium	0
Japan	3

Third round
Brazil	0
Macedonia	3
Turkey	3
Japan	1

Quarterfinals
Macedonia	1
Turkey	3

=== Pool C ===
First round
Bosnia and Herzegovina	3
Austria	1
Republic of the Congo	0
Kosovo	3
China	1
Algeria	3
Italy	3
Cameroon	1
Croatia	3
Hong Kong	0

Second round
Bosnia and Herzegovina	3
Kosovo	1
Algeria	0
Kazakhstan	3
Italy	3
Chinese Taipei	0
Croatia	3
Germany	0

Third round
Bosnia and Herzegovina	3
Kazakhstan	1
Italy	3
Croatia	2

Quarterfinals
Bosnia and Herzegovina	1
Italy	3

=== Pool D ===
First round
Slovakia	3
Kuwait	0
Russia	0
Jordan	3
Australia	1
Portugal	3
Armenia	3
Romania	1

Second round
Slovakia	3
Serbia	2
Jordan	3
United States	2
Portugal	1
Senegal	2
Armenia	0
Iran	3

Third round
Slovakia	0
Jordan	3
Senegal	1
Iran	3

Quarterfinals
Jordan	1
Iran	3
