= Stefan Joksimović =

Slovenian basketball player (born 2008)

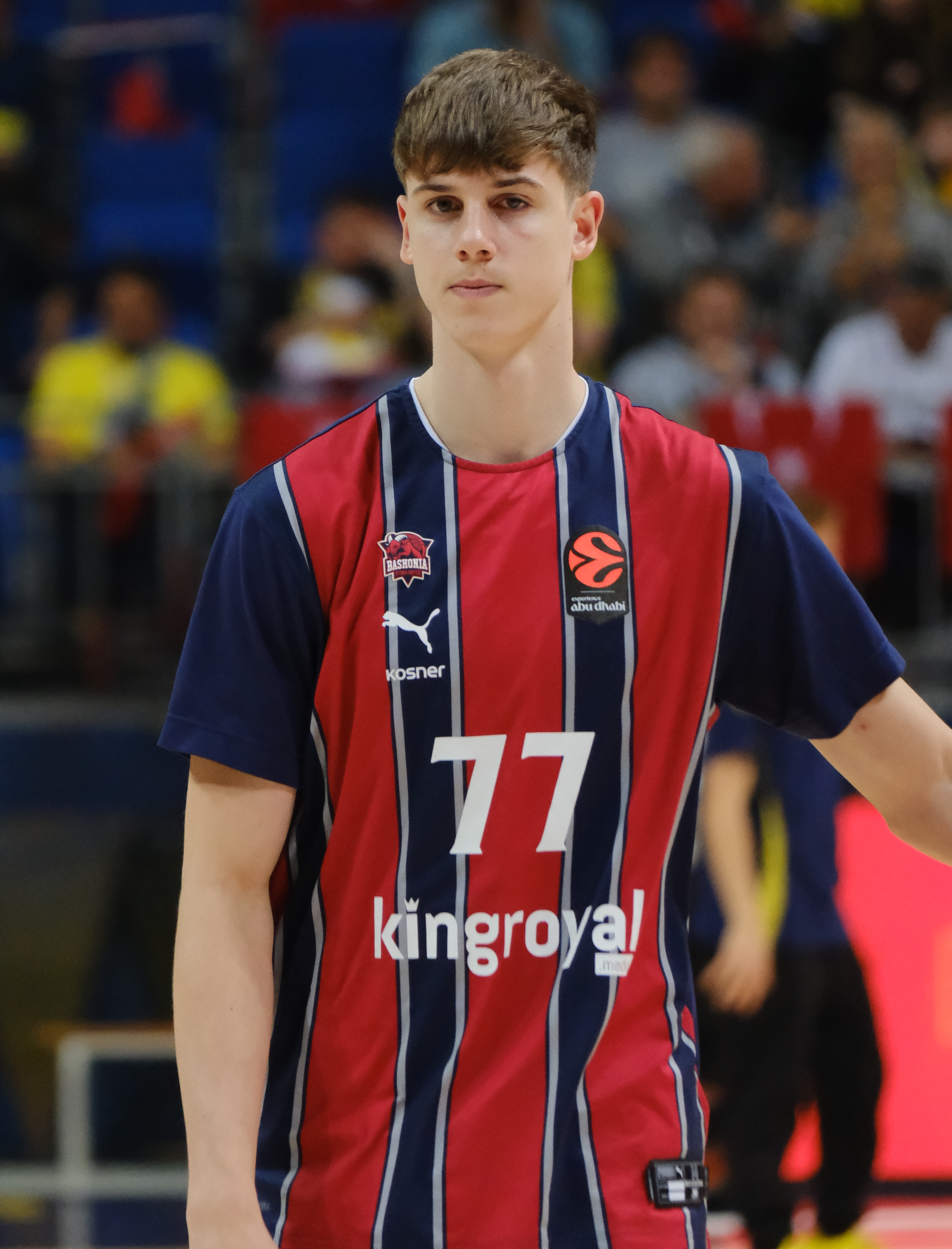
- Joksimović with Baskonia in 2026

No. 6 – Baskonia
- Position: Shooting guard
- League: Liga ACB; EuroLeague

Personal information
- Born: 16 November 2008 (age 17) Belgrade, Serbia
- Listed height: 2.04 m (6 ft 8 in)
- Listed weight: 85 kg (187 lb)

Career information
- Playing career: 2025–present

Career history
- 2025–present: Baskonia

Career highlights
- Spanish Cup winner (2026); FIBA U18 EuroBasket MVP (2026)
Medals
Men's basketball
Representing Slovenia
FIBA U18 EuroBasket
Gold medal – first place	2026 Italy	Team

Stefan Joksimović (born 16 November 2008) is a Slovenian professional basketball player for Baskonia of the Spanish Liga ACB and the EuroLeague.

== Early life ==
Joksimović was born on 16 November 2008. He is the son of former Slovenia national team player Nebojša Joksimović, and was born in Belgrade, Serbia, when his father was playing professionally there. He grew up in Ljubljana, Slovenia. At age 14, Joksimović moved to Spain to join the club Saski Baskonia, where he started in the youth academy. He averaged 10.2 points, 4.3 rebounds and 2.8 assists per game with the Baskonia reserve team in 2024–25.

== Professional career ==
Joksimović joined the Baskonia senior team during the 2025–26 season at the age of 16 in Liga ACB and EuroLeague play. He debuted in October 2025 and became one of the youngest players in team history, as well as the all-time youngest Baskonia player in the EuroLeague. Later that season, he became Baskonia's youngest-ever player at the Copa del Rey de Baloncesto tournament, helping them to the 2026 championship. Joksimović appeared 11 times in the EuroLeague during the 2025–26 season and also averaged 2.9 points and 1.1 rebounds in Liga ACB play. He had interest from NCAA teams in the U.S. recruiting him to play college basketball, but opted to stay with Baskonia for the 2026–27 season.

Joksimović has been regarded as a top prospect for the 2027 NBA draft. He has received comparisons to fellow Slovenian basketball player and NBA star Luka Dončić.

== International career ==
Joksimović has competed for Slovenia internationally at several levels. He was a standout performer with the national under-16 team at the 2024 FIBA U16 EuroBasket tournament, averaging 14.5 points, 5.6 rebounds and 3.4 assists. The following year, he helped the under-18 team to sixth at the 2025 FIBA U18 EuroBasket, posting 13.6 points, 4.9 rebounds and 2.9 assists in play against players two years older than himself. In August 2025, he won MVP of the Basketball Without Borders Europe camp after leading the competition with an average of 8.9 points per game. He made his first appearance with the senior national team in November 2025, shortly after his 17th birthday.
