= Kostiantyn Tsymbal =

Ukrainian karateka

- Born: Цимбал Костянтин Олександрович; July 26, 1993 (age 33)
- Nationality: Ukrainian
- Style: Karate Kumite
- Team: "МГО СК Сен-бін", Kyiv

Kostiantyn Tsymbal (Ukrainian: Цимбал Костянтин Олександрович, born July 27, 1993) is a Ukrainian karateka competing in the kumite 84 kg division. He is 2017 and 2018 European Team Championships medalist.
