= Andriy Toroshanko =

Ukrainian karateka

- Born: Торошанко Андрій Іванович; May 31, 1998 (age 28)
- Nationality: Ukrainian
- Style: Karate Kumite
- Team: "МГО СК Сен-бін", Kyiv

Andriy Toroshanko (Ukrainian: Торошанко Андрій Іванович; born May 31, 1998) is a Ukrainian karateka competing in the kumite 84 kg division. He is 2017 and 2018 European Team Championships medalist.
