= Valerii Sonnykh =

Ukrainian karateka (born 1997)

- Born: Сонних Валерій Віталійович; June 10, 1997 (age 29); Sumy, Ukraine
- Nationality: Ukrainian
- Style: Karate Kumite
- Team: "Чемпіон ГО СК" Kyiv
- Trainer: Maksym Nevmerzhytskyi

Valerii Sonnykh (Ukrainian: Сонних Валерій Віталійович; born 10 June 1997) is a Ukrainian karateka competing in the kumite 75 kg division. He is 2023 European champion in men's team event.
