= Ryzvan Talibov =

Ukrainian karateka (born 1998)

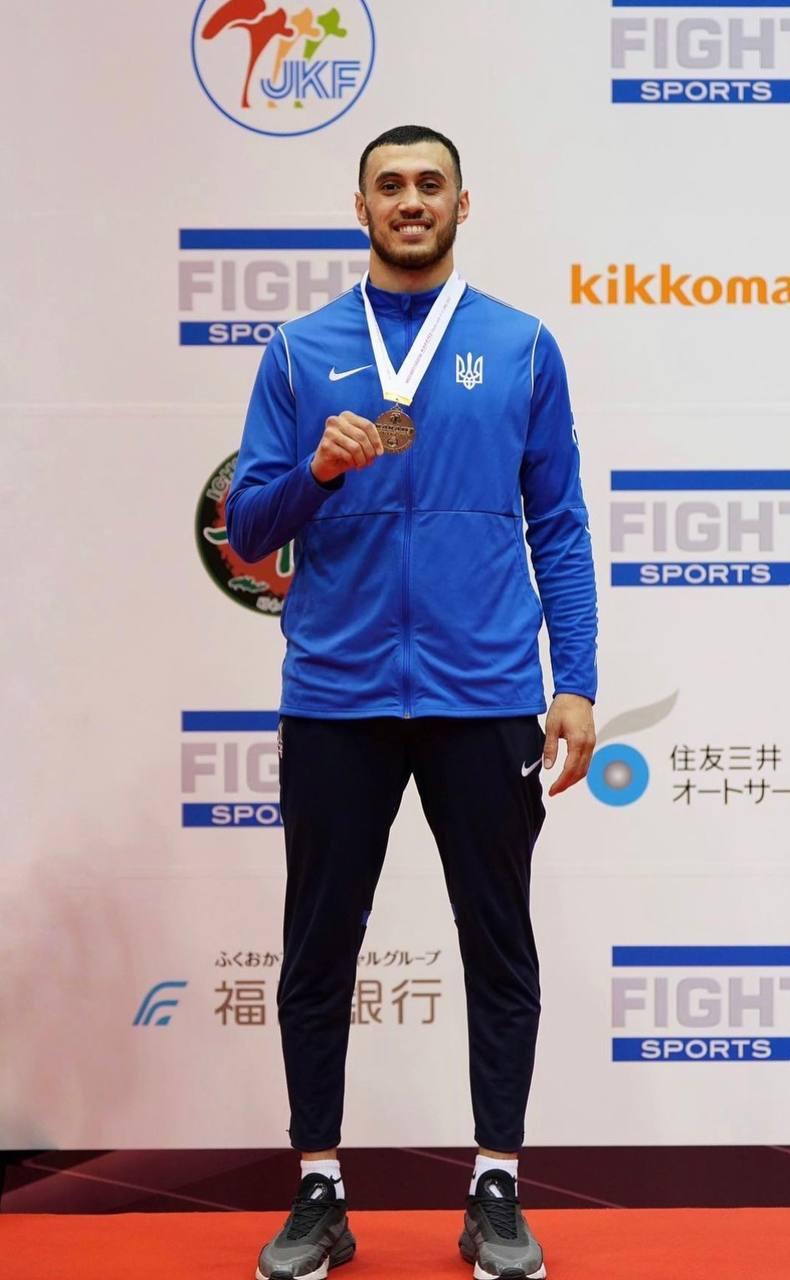
- Born: Талібов Різван Шахмамед-огли; 20 January 1998 (age 28)
- Nationality: Ukrainian
- Style: Karate Kumite
- Team: "ЧОГО СК Максимум", Chernivtsi

Ryzvan Talibov (Ukrainian: Талібов Різван Шахмамед-огли, born 20 January 1998) is a Ukrainian karateka competing in the kumite 75 kg division. He is 2018 European Team Championships medalist.

In November 2021, he competed in the men's +84 kg event at the 2021 World Karate Championships held in Dubai, United Arab Emirates.
