= 2019 Karate1 Premier League =

The Karate 1 – Premier League 2019 is a series of international karate competitions organized by the World Karate Federation (WKF) during the year 2019. The series consists of multiple stages held in different countries as part of the Premier League circuit and brings together the world's top karate athletes competing in both kata and kumite disciplines.

This series is considered one of the most important events in international karate, as it contributes to the WKF world ranking system and Olympic qualification pathways.

== Events ==
Karate 1 – Premier League 2019
Stages	Date	Series	City	Country
1	25–27 January 2019	Premier League – Paris	Paris	France
2	15–17 February 2019	Premier League – Dubai	Dubai	United Arab Emirates
3	19–21 April 2019	Premier League – Rabat	Rabat	Morocco
4	7–9 June 2019	Premier League – Shanghai	Shanghai	China
5	6–8 September 2019	Premier League – Tokyo	Tokyo	Japan
6	4–6 October 2019	Premier League – Moscow	Moscow	Russia
7	29 November – 1 December 2019	Premier League – Madrid	Madrid	Spain

== Karate1 Premier League - Paris 2019 ==
The Karate 1 Premier League – Paris 2019 was held on 25–27 January 2019 in Paris, France.

=== Men ===
Event	Gold	Silver	Bronze
Individual kata	Ryo Kiyuna; Japan	Damián Quintero; Spain	Issei Shimbaba; Japan
Individual kata	Ryo Kiyuna; Japan	Damián Quintero; Spain	Kazumasa Moto; Japan
Kumite -60 kg	Majid Hassanniaideilami; Iran	Angelo Crescenzo; Italy	Darkhan Assadilov; Kazakhstan
Kumite -60 kg	Majid Hassanniaideilami; Iran	Angelo Crescenzo; Italy	Evgeny Plakhutin; Russia
Kumite -67 kg	Steven Da Costa; France	Luca Maresca; Italy	Assylbek Muratov; Kazakhstan
Kumite -67 kg	Steven Da Costa; France	Luca Maresca; Italy	Amirali Didar; Kazakhstan
Kumite -75 kg	Ken Nishimura; Japan	Rafael Aghayev; Azerbaijan	Stanislav Horuna; Ukraine
Kumite -75 kg	Ken Nishimura; Japan	Rafael Aghayev; Azerbaijan	Ali Asghar Asiabar; Iran
Kumite -84 kg	Anton Isakau; Belarus	Mahdi Ghararizadeh Mahani; Iran	Rikito Shimada; Japan
Kumite -84 kg	Anton Isakau; Belarus	Mahdi Ghararizadeh Mahani; Iran	Ahmed Ramadan Mohamed; Egypt
Kumite +84 kg	Gogita Arkania; Georgia	Saleh Abazari; Iran	Sajad Ganjzadeh; Iran
Kumite +84 kg	Gogita Arkania; Georgia	Saleh Abazari; Iran	Mehdi Filali; France
Team kata	Kuwait; Sayed Mohammad Almosawi; Mohammad Husain; Sayed Salman Almosawi	Spain; Jose Manuel Carbonell Lopez; Francisco Jose Salazar Jover; Sergio Galan Lopez	Turkey; Emre Vefa Goktas; Ali Sofuoglu; Kutluhan Duran
Team kata	Kuwait; Sayed Mohammad Almosawi; Mohammad Husain; Sayed Salman Almosawi	Spain; Jose Manuel Carbonell Lopez; Francisco Jose Salazar Jover; Sergio Galan Lopez	Morocco; Bilal Benkacem; Adnane Elhakimi; Mohammed Elhanni

=== Women ===
Event	Gold	Silver	Bronze
Individual kata	Kiyou Shimizu; Japan	Sandra Sanchez Jaime; Spain	Viviana Bottaro; Italy
Individual kata	Kiyou Shimizu; Japan	Sandra Sanchez Jaime; Spain	Hikaru Ono; Japan
Kumite -50 kg	Serap Ozcelik Arapoglu; Turkey	Miho Miyahara; Japan	Shara Hubrich; Germany
Kumite -50 kg	Serap Ozcelik Arapoglu; Turkey	Miho Miyahara; Japan	Jessica De Paula; Brazil
Kumite -55 kg	Anzhelika Terliuga; Ukraine	Dorota Banaszczyk; Poland	Shiori Nakamura; Japan
Kumite -55 kg	Anzhelika Terliuga; Ukraine	Dorota Banaszczyk; Poland	Lorena Busa; Italy
Kumite -61 kg	Gwendoline Philippe; France	Giana Lotfy; Egypt	Laura Sivert; France
Kumite -61 kg	Gwendoline Philippe; France	Giana Lotfy; Egypt	Merve Coban; Turkey
Kumite -68 kg	Elena Quirici; Switzerland	Kayo Someya; Japan	Johanna Kneer; Germany
Kumite -68 kg	Elena Quirici; Switzerland	Kayo Someya; Japan	Sachiko Akita Ramos; Mexico
Kumite 68+ kg	Ayumi Uekusa; Japan	Nancy Garcia; France	Ayaka Saito; Japan
Kumite 68+ kg	Ayumi Uekusa; Japan	Nancy Garcia; France	Menna Shaaban Okila; Egypt
Team kata	Russia; Polina Kotlyarova; Irina Troitskaya; Mariya Zotova	Iran; Najmesadat Ghazizadeh Fard; Elnaz Taghipour; Shadi Jafarizadeh	Italy; Noemi Nicosanti; Carola Casale; Michela Pezzetti
Team kata	Russia; Polina Kotlyarova; Irina Troitskaya; Mariya Zotova	Iran; Najmesadat Ghazizadeh Fard; Elnaz Taghipour; Shadi Jafarizadeh	Morocco; Aya En-Nesyry; Lamiae Bertali; Sanae Agalmame

== Karate1 Premier League - Dubai 2019 ==
The Karate 1 Premier League – Dubai 2019 was held on 15–17 February 2019 in Dubai, United Arab Emirates.

=== Men ===
Event	Gold	Silver	Bronze
Individual kata	Ryo Kiyuna; Japan	Damián Quintero; Spain	Issei Shimbaba; Japan
Individual kata	Ryo Kiyuna; Japan	Damián Quintero; Spain	Mattia Busato; Italy
Kumite -60 kg	Darkhan Assadilov; Kazakhstan	Yunosuke Minami; Japan	Eray Samdan; Turkey
Kumite -60 kg	Darkhan Assadilov; Kazakhstan	Yunosuke Minami; Japan	Kaisar Alpysbay; Kazakhstan
Kumite -67 kg	Steven Da Costa; France	Didar Amirali; Kazakhstan	Amir Reza Mirzaei; Iran
Kumite -67 kg	Steven Da Costa; France	Didar Amirali; Kazakhstan	Hamoon Derafshipour; Iran
Kumite -75 kg	Bahman Asgari Ghoncheh; Iran	Luigi Busà; Italy	Rafael Aghayev; Azerbaijan
Kumite -75 kg	Bahman Asgari Ghoncheh; Iran	Luigi Busà; Italy	Thomas Scott; United States
Kumite -84 kg	Uğur Aktaş; Turkey	Ali Fadakar; Iran	Zabiollah Poorshab; Iran
Kumite -84 kg	Uğur Aktaş; Turkey	Ali Fadakar; Iran	Farouk Abdesselem; France
Kumite +84 kg	Hideyoshi Kagawa; Japan	Mehdi Filali; France	Sajad Ganjzadeh; Iran
Kumite +84 kg	Hideyoshi Kagawa; Japan	Mehdi Filali; France	Hocine Daikhi; Algeria
Team kata	Turkey; Emre Vefa Göktaş; Ali Sofuoğlu; Kutluhan Duran	Kuwait; Mohammad Husain; Sayed Mohammad Almosawi; Sayed Salman Almosawi	Spain; José Manuel Carbonell López; Francisco José Salazar Jover; Sergio Galán López
Team kata	Turkey; Emre Vefa Göktaş; Ali Sofuoğlu; Kutluhan Duran	Kuwait; Mohammad Husain; Sayed Mohammad Almosawi; Sayed Salman Almosawi	Iran; Ali Zand; Abolfazl Shahrjerdi; Milad Delikhoun

=== Women ===
Event	Gold	Silver	Bronze
Individual kata	Sandra Sánchez; Spain	Kiyou Shimizu; Japan	Emiri Iwamoto; Japan
Individual kata	Sandra Sánchez; Spain	Kiyou Shimizu; Japan	Viviana Bottaro; Italy
Kumite -50 kg	Serap Özçelik Arapoğlu; Turkey	Kateryna Kryva; Ukraine	Reem Salama; Egypt
Kumite -50 kg	Serap Özçelik Arapoğlu; Turkey	Kateryna Kryva; Ukraine	Sophia Bouderbane; France
Kumite -55 kg	Wen Tzu-yun; Chinese Taipei	Anzhelika Terliuga; Ukraine	Valeria Kumizaki; Brazil
Kumite -55 kg	Wen Tzu-yun; Chinese Taipei	Anzhelika Terliuga; Ukraine	Fatemeh Chalak; Iran
Kumite -61 kg	Gwendoline Philippe; France	Giana Lotfy; Egypt	Haya Jumaa; Canada
Kumite -61 kg	Gwendoline Philippe; France	Giana Lotfy; Egypt	Rozita Alipourkeshka; Iran
Kumite +68 kg	Anne-Laure Florentin; France	Clio Ferracuti; Italy	Amelia Harvey; England
Kumite +68 kg	Anne-Laure Florentin; France	Clio Ferracuti; Italy	Menna Okila; Egypt
Team kata	Italy; Noemi Nicosanti; Carola Casale; Michela Pezzetti	Iran; Maedeh Nasiripey; Mahsa Afsaneh; Parisa Rahmani	Australia; Mishela Dimoska; Marijana Dimoska; Kiriana Kamcheska
Team kata	Italy; Noemi Nicosanti; Carola Casale; Michela Pezzetti	Iran; Maedeh Nasiripey; Mahsa Afsaneh; Parisa Rahmani	Russia; Polina Kotlyarova; Irina Troitskaya; Mariia Zotova

== Karate1 Premier League - Rabat 2019 ==
The Karate 1 Premier League – Rabat 2019 was held on 19–21 April 2019 in Rabat, Morocco.

=== Men ===
Event	Gold	Silver	Bronze
Individual kata	Ryo Kiyuna; Japan	Damián Quintero; Spain	Enes Özdemir; Turkey
Individual kata	Ryo Kiyuna; Japan	Damián Quintero; Spain	Kazumasa Moto; Japan
Kumite -60 kg	Darkhan Assadilov; Kazakhstan	Eray Samdan; Turkey	Angelo Crescenzo; Italy
Kumite -60 kg	Darkhan Assadilov; Kazakhstan	Eray Samdan; Turkey	Sadriddin Saymatov; Uzbekistan
Kumite -67 kg	Ali Elsawy; Egypt	Burak Uygur; Turkey	Masamichi Funahashi; Japan
Kumite -67 kg	Ali Elsawy; Egypt	Burak Uygur; Turkey	Abdalla Abdelgawad; Egypt
Kumite -75 kg	Stanislav Horuna; Ukraine	Ali Asghar Asiabari; Iran	Ken Nishimura; Japan
Kumite -75 kg	Stanislav Horuna; Ukraine	Ali Asghar Asiabari; Iran	Rafael Aghayev; Azerbaijan
Kumite -84 kg	Valerii Chobotar; Ukraine	Ryutaro Araga; Japan	Igor Chikhmarev; Kazakhstan
Kumite -84 kg	Valerii Chobotar; Ukraine	Ryutaro Araga; Japan	Uğur Aktaş; Turkey
Kumite +84 kg	Sajad Ganjzadeh; Iran	Alparslan Yamanoğlu; Turkey	Saleh Abazari; Iran
Kumite +84 kg	Sajad Ganjzadeh; Iran	Alparslan Yamanoğlu; Turkey	Jonathan Horne; Germany
Team kata	Turkey; Emre Vefa Göktaş; Kutluhan Duran; Enes Özdemir	Russia; Emil Skovorodnikov; Mehman Rzaev; Maksim Ksenofontov	Morocco; Mohammed Elhanni; Adnane Elhakimi; Bilal Benkacem
Team kata	Turkey; Emre Vefa Göktaş; Kutluhan Duran; Enes Özdemir	Russia; Emil Skovorodnikov; Mehman Rzaev; Maksim Ksenofontov	Morocco; Mohammed Sedraoui; Mouad Ouarzazi; Marouane Maanaoui

=== Women ===
Event	Gold	Silver	Bronze
Individual kata	Kiyou Shimizu; Japan	Sandra Sánchez; Spain	Dilara Eltemur; Turkey
Individual kata	Kiyou Shimizu; Japan	Sandra Sánchez; Spain	Hikaru Ono; Japan
Kumite -50 kg	Serap Özçelik Arapoğlu; Turkey	Radwa Sayed; Egypt	Bettina Plank; Austria
Kumite -50 kg	Serap Özçelik Arapoğlu; Turkey	Radwa Sayed; Egypt	Junna Tsukii; Philippines
Kumite -55 kg	Anzhelika Terliuga; Ukraine	Wen Tzu-yun; Chinese Taipei	Travat Khaksar; Iran
Kumite -55 kg	Anzhelika Terliuga; Ukraine	Wen Tzu-yun; Chinese Taipei	Tuba Yakan; Turkey
Kumite -61 kg	Yin Xiaoyan; China	Giana Lotfy; Egypt	Gwendoline Philippe; France
Kumite -61 kg	Yin Xiaoyan; China	Giana Lotfy; Egypt	Mayumi Someya; Japan
Kumite -68 kg	Elena Quirici; Switzerland	Halyna Melnyk; Ukraine	Kayo Someya; Japan
Kumite -68 kg	Elena Quirici; Switzerland	Halyna Melnyk; Ukraine	Vasiliki Panetsidou; Greece
Kumite +68 kg	Meltem Hocaoğlu; Turkey	Guadalupe Quintal; Mexico	Hamideh Abbasli; Iran
Kumite +68 kg	Meltem Hocaoğlu; Turkey	Guadalupe Quintal; Mexico	María Torres García; Spain
Team kata	Italy; Terryana D'Onofrio; Michela Pezzetti; Carola Casale	Russia; Polina Kotlyarova; Irina Troitskaya; Mariia Zotova	Morocco; Aya En-Nesyry; Lamyae Bertali; Sanae Agalmame
Team kata	Italy; Terryana D'Onofrio; Michela Pezzetti; Carola Casale	Russia; Polina Kotlyarova; Irina Troitskaya; Mariia Zotova	Russia; Anastasiia Muracheva; Ekaterina Gorshunova; Daria Tuliakova

== Karate1 Premier League - Shanghai 2019 ==
The Karate 1 Premier League – Shanghai 2019 was held on 7–9 June 2019 in Shanghai, China.

=== Men ===
Event	Gold	Silver	Bronze
Individual kata	Ryo Kiyuna; Japan	Damián Quintero; Spain	Kazumasa Moto; Japan
Individual kata	Ryo Kiyuna; Japan	Damián Quintero; Spain	Issei Shimbaba; Japan
Kumite -60 kg	Darkhan Assadilov; Kazakhstan	Kaisar Alpysbair; Kazakhstan	Firdovsi Farzaliyev; Azerbaijan
Kumite -60 kg	Darkhan Assadilov; Kazakhstan	Kaisar Alpysbair; Kazakhstan	Majid Hassanniaideilami; Iran
Kumite -67 kg	Andrés Madera; Venezuela	Seyedali Karimi; Iran	Ali Elsawy; Egypt
Kumite -67 kg	Andrés Madera; Venezuela	Seyedali Karimi; Iran	Yves Martial Tadissi; Hungary
Kumite -75 kg	Dastonbek Otabolaev; Uzbekistan	Bahman Asgari Ghoncheh; Iran	Yusei Sakiyama; Japan
Kumite -75 kg	Dastonbek Otabolaev; Uzbekistan	Bahman Asgari Ghoncheh; Iran	Erman Eltemur; Turkey
Kumite -84 kg	Uğur Aktaş; Turkey	Ivan Kvesić; Croatia	Panah Abdullayev; Azerbaijan
Kumite -84 kg	Uğur Aktaş; Turkey	Ivan Kvesić; Croatia	Mahdi Khodabakhshi; Iran
Kumite +84 kg	Sajad Ganjzadeh; Iran	Saleh Abazari; Iran	Gogita Arkania; Georgia
Kumite +84 kg	Sajad Ganjzadeh; Iran	Saleh Abazari; Iran	Mehdi Filali; France
Team kata	Kuwait; Sayed Mohammed Almosawi; Mohammad Husain; Sayed Salman Almosawi	Hong Kong; Howard Hung Ho-wai; Leung Shing-ho; Lau Chi-ming	Malaysia; Hoe Thomson; Oh Theng Wei Ivan; Leong Emmanuel
Team kata	Kuwait; Sayed Mohammed Almosawi; Mohammad Husain; Sayed Salman Almosawi	Hong Kong; Howard Hung Ho-wai; Leung Shing-ho; Lau Chi-ming	China; Lu Jinchun; Zhang Shihong; Yao Mengjie

=== Women ===
Event	Gold	Silver	Bronze
Individual kata	Sandra Sánchez; Spain	Kiyou Shimizu; Japan	Hikaru Ono; Japan
Individual kata	Sandra Sánchez; Spain	Kiyou Shimizu; Japan	Grace Lau; Hong Kong
Kumite -50 kg	Serap Özçelik Arapoğlu; Turkey	Alexandra Recchia; France	Radwa Sayed; Egypt
Kumite -50 kg	Serap Özçelik Arapoğlu; Turkey	Alexandra Recchia; France	Reem Salama; Egypt
Kumite -55 kg	Anzhelika Terliuga; Ukraine	Ding Jiamei; China	Sabrina Ouihaddadene; France
Kumite -55 kg	Anzhelika Terliuga; Ukraine	Ding Jiamei; China	Travat Khaksar; Iran
Kumite -61 kg	Yin Xiaoyan; China	Jovana Preković; Serbia	Leila Heurtault; France
Kumite -61 kg	Yin Xiaoyan; China	Jovana Preković; Serbia	Ayami Moriguchi; Japan
Kumite -68 kg	Alizée Agier; France	Gong Li; China	Elena Quirici; Switzerland
Kumite -68 kg	Alizée Agier; France	Gong Li; China	Vasiliki Panetsidou; Greece
Kumite +68 kg	Sofya Berultseva; Kazakhstan	Gao Mengmeng; China	Ayumi Uekusa; Japan
Kumite +68 kg	Sofya Berultseva; Kazakhstan	Gao Mengmeng; China	Hamideh Abbasali; Iran
Team kata	Japan; Mao Yasui; Akari Igawa; Ayaka Takeshita	China; Chen Ye; Liao Yilin; Tao Yiwei	Hong Kong; Ma Ka-man; Wu Lok-man; Jenny To Siu-fung
Team kata	Japan; Mao Yasui; Akari Igawa; Ayaka Takeshita	China; Chen Ye; Liao Yilin; Tao Yiwei	Vietnam; Le Thi Khanh Ly; Luu Thi Thu Uyen; Nguyen Thi Phuong

== Karate1 Premier League - Tokyo 2019 ==
The Karate 1 Premier League – Tokyo 2019 was held on 6–8 September 2019 in Tokyo, Japan.

=== Men ===
Event	Gold	Silver	Bronze
Individual kata	Ryo Kiyuna; Japan	Issei Shimbaba; Japan	Damian Hugo Quintero Capdevila; Spain
Individual kata	Ryo Kiyuna; Japan	Issei Shimbaba; Japan	Kazumasa Moto; Japan
Kumite -60 kg	Darkhan Assadilov; Kazakhstan	Angelo Crescenzo; Italy	Majid Hassanniaideilami; Iran
Kumite -60 kg	Darkhan Assadilov; Kazakhstan	Angelo Crescenzo; Italy	Eray Samdan; Turkey
Kumite -67 kg	Hiroto Gomyo; Japan	Burak Uygur; Turkey	Vinicius Figueira; Brazil
Kumite -67 kg	Hiroto Gomyo; Japan	Burak Uygur; Turkey	Soichiro Nakano; Japan
Kumite -75 kg	Ken Nishimura; Japan	Rafael Aghayev; Azerbaijan	Bahman Asgari; Iran
Kumite -75 kg	Ken Nishimura; Japan	Rafael Aghayev; Azerbaijan	Stanislav Horuna; Ukraine
Kumite -84 kg	Ryutaro Araga; Japan	Zabihollah Poorshab; Iran	Ayhan Mamayev; Azerbaijan
Kumite -84 kg	Ryutaro Araga; Japan	Zabihollah Poorshab; Iran	Ivan Kvesic; Croatia
Kumite +84 kg	Jonathan Horne; Germany	Saleh Abazari; Iran	Gogita Arkania; Georgia
Kumite +84 kg	Jonathan Horne; Germany	Saleh Abazari; Iran	Mehdi Filali; France
Team kata	Japan; Arata Kinjo; Takuya Uemura; Ryo Kiyuna	Japan; Takeru Sasaoka; Kanta Matsumoto; Futa Matsumoto	Turkey; Ali Sofuoglu; Enes Ozdemir; Emre Vefa Goktas
Team kata	Japan; Arata Kinjo; Takuya Uemura; Ryo Kiyuna	Japan; Takeru Sasaoka; Kanta Matsumoto; Futa Matsumoto	Japan; Koji Arimoto; Ryuji Moto; Kazumasa Moto

=== Women ===
Event	Gold	Silver	Bronze
Individual kata	Kiyou Shimizu; Japan	Sandra Sanchez Jaime; Spain	Emiri Iwamoto; Japan
Individual kata	Kiyou Shimizu; Japan	Sandra Sanchez Jaime; Spain	Viviana Bottaro; Italy
Kumite -50 kg	Serap Özçelik Arapoğlu; Turkey	Alexandra Recchia; France	Ayaka Tadano; Japan
Kumite -50 kg	Serap Özçelik Arapoğlu; Turkey	Alexandra Recchia; France	Ranran Li; China
Kumite -55 kg	Anzhelika Terliuga; Ukraine	Tzu-Yun Wen; Chinese Taipei	Shiori Nakamura; Japan
Kumite -55 kg	Anzhelika Terliuga; Ukraine	Tzu-Yun Wen; Chinese Taipei	Carlota Fernandez Osorio; Spain
Kumite -61 kg	Giana Lotfy; Egypt	Leila Heurtault; France	Xiaoyan Yin; China
Kumite -61 kg	Giana Lotfy; Egypt	Leila Heurtault; France	Mayumi Someya; Japan
Kumite -68 kg	Irina Zaretska; Azerbaijan	Alizée Agier; France	Alisa Buchinger; Austria
Kumite -68 kg	Irina Zaretska; Azerbaijan	Alizée Agier; France	Li Gong; China
Kumite +68 kg	Ayumi Uekusa; Japan	Clio Ferracuti; Italy	Eleni Chatziliadou; Greece
Kumite +68 kg	Ayumi Uekusa; Japan	Clio Ferracuti; Italy	Titta Keinänen; Finland
Team kata	Japan; Natsuki Shimizu; Yui Umekage; Azuki Ogawa	Japan; Maho Ono; Mirei Shirotani; Nana Kawakami	Japan; Ayana Iwata; Yurika Izumi; Runa Hanaoka
Team kata	Japan; Natsuki Shimizu; Yui Umekage; Azuki Ogawa	Japan; Maho Ono; Mirei Shirotani; Nana Kawakami	Vietnam; Thi Phuong Nguyen; Thi Thu Uyen Luu; Thi Khanh Ly Le

== Karate1 Premier League - Moscow 2019 ==
The Karate 1 Premier League – Moscow 2019 was held on 4–6 October 2019 in Moscow, Russia.

=== Men ===
Event	Gold	Silver	Bronze
Individual kata	Ryo Kiyuna; Japan	Damian Hugo Quintero Capdevila; Spain	Issei Shimbaba; Japan
Individual kata	Ryo Kiyuna; Japan	Damian Hugo Quintero Capdevila; Spain	Kazumasa Moto; Japan
Kumite -60 kg	Emil Pavlov; North Macedonia	Eray Samdan; Turkey	Kalvis Kalnins; Latvia
Kumite -60 kg	Emil Pavlov; North Macedonia	Eray Samdan; Turkey	Daulet Shymyrbekov; Kazakhstan
Kumite -67 kg	Steven Da Costa; France	Ali Elsawy; Egypt	Didar Amirali; Kazakhstan
Kumite -67 kg	Steven Da Costa; France	Ali Elsawy; Egypt	Masamichi Funahashi; Japan
Kumite -75 kg	Rafael Aghayev; Azerbaijan	Yermek Ainazarov; Kazakhstan	Bahman Asgari Ghoncheh; Iran
Kumite -75 kg	Rafael Aghayev; Azerbaijan	Yermek Ainazarov; Kazakhstan	Luigi Busa; Italy
Kumite -84 kg	Zabihollah Poorshab; Iran	Ryutaro Araga; Japan	Jessie Da Costa; France
Kumite -84 kg	Zabihollah Poorshab; Iran	Ryutaro Araga; Japan	Denis Denisenko; Russia
Kumite +84 kg	Gogita Arkania; Georgia	Sajad Ganjzadeh; Iran	Mehdi Filali; France
Team kata	Turkey; Ali Sofuoglu; Enes Ozdemir; Kutluhan Duran	Italy; Giuseppe Panagia; Alessandro Iodice; Gianluca Gallo	Spain; Jose Manuel Carbonell Lopez; Alejandro Manzana Diaz; Sergio Galan Lopez
Team kata	Turkey; Ali Sofuoglu; Enes Ozdemir; Kutluhan Duran	Italy; Giuseppe Panagia; Alessandro Iodice; Gianluca Gallo	Russia; Maksim Ksenofontov; Mehman Rzaev; Emil Skovorodnikov

=== Women ===
Event	Gold	Silver	Bronze
Individual kata	Sandra Sánchez Jaime; Spain	Kiyou Shimizu; Japan	Viviana Bottaro; Italy
Individual kata	Sandra Sánchez Jaime; Spain	Kiyou Shimizu; Japan	Hikaru Ono; Japan
Kumite -50 kg	Sara Bahmanyar; Iran	Shara Hubrich; Germany	Ranran Li; China
Kumite -50 kg	Sara Bahmanyar; Iran	Shara Hubrich; Germany	Nurane Aliyeva; Azerbaijan
Kumite -55 kg	Anzhelika Terliuga; Ukraine	Sara Yamada; Japan	Shiori Nakamura; Japan
Kumite -55 kg	Anzhelika Terliuga; Ukraine	Sara Yamada; Japan	Tzu-Yun Wen; Chinese Taipei
Kumite -61 kg	Rozita Alipourkeshka; Iran	Haya Jumaa; Canada	Jovana Prekovic; Serbia
Kumite -61 kg	Rozita Alipourkeshka; Iran	Haya Jumaa; Canada	Xiaoyan Yin; China
Kumite -68 kg	Irina Zaretska; Azerbaijan	Li Gong; China	Katrine Pedersen; Denmark
Kumite -68 kg	Irina Zaretska; Azerbaijan	Li Gong; China	Eda Eltemur; Turkey
Kumite +68 kg	Ivanna Zaytseva; Russia	Ayumi Uekusa; Japan	Sofya Berultseva; Kazakhstan
Kumite +68 kg	Ivanna Zaytseva; Russia	Ayumi Uekusa; Japan	Maria Torres Garcia; Spain
Team kata	Spain; Raquel Roy Rubio; Lidia Rodriguez Encabo; Marta Vega Letamendi	Russia; Polina Kotlyarova; Irina Troitskaya; Mariia Zotova	Malaysia; Chang Sin Yi; Lee Celine Xin Yi; Khaw Yee Voon
Team kata	Spain; Raquel Roy Rubio; Lidia Rodriguez Encabo; Marta Vega Letamendi	Russia; Polina Kotlyarova; Irina Troitskaya; Mariia Zotova	Russia; Ekaterina Gorshunova; Daria Tuliakova; Anastasiia Muracheva

== Karate1 Premier League - Madrid 2019 ==
The Karate 1 Premier League – Madrid 2019 was held on 29 November – 1 December 2019 in Madrid, Spain.

=== Men ===
Event	Gold	Silver	Bronze
Individual kata	Damian Hugo Quintero Capdevila; Spain	Ali Sofuoglu; Turkey	Arata Kinjo; Japan
Individual kata	Damian Hugo Quintero Capdevila; Spain	Ali Sofuoglu; Turkey	Kazumasa Moto; Japan
Kumite -60 kg	Darkhan Assadilov; Kazakhstan	Kaisar Alpysbay; Kazakhstan	Eray Samdan; Turkey
Kumite -60 kg	Darkhan Assadilov; Kazakhstan	Kaisar Alpysbay; Kazakhstan	Oussama Edari; Morocco
Kumite -67 kg	Amir Mehdizadeh; Iran	Omer Ozer; Turkey	Vinicius Figueira; Brazil
Kumite -67 kg	Amir Mehdizadeh; Iran	Omer Ozer; Turkey	Steven Da Costa; France
Kumite -75 kg	Yermek Ainazarov; Kazakhstan	Logan Da Costa; France	Rodrigo Ibanez Saenz-Torre; Spain
Kumite -75 kg	Yermek Ainazarov; Kazakhstan	Logan Da Costa; France	Luigi Busa; Italy
Kumite -84 kg	Ugur Aktas; Turkey	Daniyar Yuldashev; Kazakhstan	Panah Abdullayev; Azerbaijan
Kumite -84 kg	Ugur Aktas; Turkey	Daniyar Yuldashev; Kazakhstan	Ryutaro Araga; Japan
Kumite +84 kg	Sajad Ganjzadeh; Iran	Dnylson Jacquet; France	Andjelo Kvesic; Croatia
Kumite +84 kg	Sajad Ganjzadeh; Iran	Dnylson Jacquet; France	Saleh Abazari; Iran
Team kata	Turkey; Enes Ozdemir; Ali Sofuoglu; Emre Vefa Goktas	Italy; Gianluca Gallo; Alessandro Iodice; Giuseppe Panagia	Spain; Jose Manuel Carbonell Lopez; Alejandro Manzana Diaz; Sergio Galan Lopez
Team kata	Turkey; Enes Ozdemir; Ali Sofuoglu; Emre Vefa Goktas	Italy; Gianluca Gallo; Alessandro Iodice; Giuseppe Panagia	Morocco; Bilal Benkacem; Mohammed El Hanni; Adnane El Hakimi

=== Women ===
Event	Gold	Silver	Bronze
Individual kata	Sandra Sánchez Jaime; Spain	Kiyou Shimizu; Japan	Emiri Iwamoto; Japan
Individual kata	Sandra Sánchez Jaime; Spain	Kiyou Shimizu; Japan	Hikaru Ono; Japan
Kumite -50 kg	Bakhriniso Babaeva; Uzbekistan	Serap Özçelik Arapoğlu; Turkey	Radwa Sayed; Egypt
Kumite -50 kg	Bakhriniso Babaeva; Uzbekistan	Serap Özçelik Arapoğlu; Turkey	Rinka Tahata; Japan
Kumite -55 kg	Yassmin Attia; Egypt	Tuba Yakan; Turkey	Tzu-Yun Wen; Chinese Taipei
Kumite -55 kg	Yassmin Attia; Egypt	Tuba Yakan; Turkey	Carlota Fernandez Osorio; Spain
Kumite -61 kg	Xiaoyan Yin; China	Nailya Gataullina; Russia	Gwendoline Philippe; France
Kumite -61 kg	Xiaoyan Yin; China	Nailya Gataullina; Russia	Haya Jumaa; Canada
Kumite -68 kg	Irina Zaretska; Azerbaijan	Silvia Semeraro; Italy	Halyna Melnyk; Ukraine
Kumite -68 kg	Irina Zaretska; Azerbaijan	Silvia Semeraro; Italy	Elena Quirici; Switzerland
Kumite +68 kg	Sofya Berultseva; Kazakhstan	Eleni Chatziliadou; Greece	Maria Torres Garcia; Spain
Kumite +68 kg	Sofya Berultseva; Kazakhstan	Eleni Chatziliadou; Greece	Hamideh Abbasali; Iran
Team kata	Japan; Natsuki Shimizu; Yui Umekage; Azuki Ogawa	Portugal; Mariana Belo; Patricia Esparteiro; Ana Sofia Carrico Cruz	Spain; Jessica Moreno Wilkinson; Maria Lopez Pintado; Nuria Escudero Solis
Team kata	Japan; Natsuki Shimizu; Yui Umekage; Azuki Ogawa	Portugal; Mariana Belo; Patricia Esparteiro; Ana Sofia Carrico Cruz	Spain; Raquel Roy Rubio; Lidia Rodriguez Encabo; Marta Vega Letamendi
