= 2022 European Karate Championships – Men's individual kata =

European Karate Championship

Men's individual kata at the 2022 European Karate Championships
- Venue: Karataş Şahinbey Sport Hall
- Location: Gaziantep, Turkey
- Dates: 25–28 May
- Competitors: 33 from 33 nations

Medalists
gold medal	Ali Sofuoğlu	Turkey
silver medal	Damián Quintero	Spain
bronze medal	Yuki Ujihara	Switzerland
bronze medal	Mattia Busato	Italy

The Men's individual kata competition at the 2022 European Karate Championships was held from 25 to 28 May 2022.

== Results ==
=== Round 1 ===
Rank	Pool 1		Pool 2		Pool 3		Pool 4	
Rank	Athlete	Total	Athlete	Total	Athlete	Total	Athlete	Total
1	(Switzerland) Yuki Ujihara	24.48	(Spain) Damián Quintero	25.08	(Italy) Mattia Busato	25.46	(Turkey) Ali Sofuoğlu	25.54
2	(Germany) Ilja Smorguner	24.46	(Slovakia) Pavol Szolár	24.06	(Azerbaijan) Roman Heydarov	24.08	(France) Franck Ngoan	23.98
3	(Hungary) Botond Nagy	24.14	(Czech Republic) Matteo Tamborlani	22.66	(Montenegro) Vladimir Mijač	23.88	(Poland) Maksymilian Szczypkowski	23.00
4	(Croatia) Matija Relić	24.12	(Finland) Saku Virtanen	22.26	(Romania) Petru Comănescu	23.68	(Bosnia and Herzegovina) Senaid Veladžić	22.68
5	(Netherlands) Mitchell Beckers	23.14	(Israel) Rami Shamilov	21.70	(Ukraine) Yaroslav Fedorov	23.40	(North Macedonia) Kristijan Bajovski	22.66
6	(Armenia) Mikhail Mkhitaryan	22.44	(Cyprus) Vryonis Soteriou	21.12	(Serbia) Uroš Subota	23.22	(Slovenia) Nejc Sterniša	22.40
7	(Austria) Patrick Valet	21.60	(Lithuania) Dovydas Žymantas	21.00	(Portugal) José Pedro Lemos	22.02	(Greece) Marios Lamprinos	20.98
8	(Kosovo) Ventor Gjuka	21.20	(Latvia) Ivars Pričins	19.54	(Bulgaria) Georgi Matuski	21.08	(Iceland) Þórður Jökull Henrysson	20.88
9	(Norway) Ruben Fagerland	21.06						

=== Round 2 ===
Rank	Pool 1		Pool 2	
Rank	Athlete	Total	Athlete	Total
1	(Spain) Damián Quintero	25.86	(Turkey) Ali Sofuoğlu	25.82
2	(Germany) Ilja Smorguner	24.42	(Italy) Mattia Busato	24.66
3	(Switzerland) Yuki Ujihara	24.40	(France) Franck Ngoan	24.48
4	(Hungary) Botond Nagy	23.54	(Azerbaijan) Roman Heydarov	24.26
5	(Croatia) Matija Relić	23.20	(Romania) Petru Comănescu	24.06
6	(Slovakia) Pavol Szolár	22.94	(Montenegro) Vladimir Mijač	23.80
7	(Czech Republic) Matteo Tamborlani	22.72	(Bosnia and Herzegovina) Senaid Veladžić	22.00
8	(Finland) Saku Virtanen	21.20	(Poland) Maksymilian Szczypkowski	21.34

=== Round 3 ===
Rank	Pool 1		Pool 2	
Rank	Athlete	Total	Athlete	Total
1	(Spain) Damián Quintero	25.96	(Turkey) Ali Sofuoğlu	26.14
2	(Switzerland) Yuki Ujihara	25.56	(Italy) Mattia Busato	25.14
3	(Hungary) Botond Nagy	24.28	(France) Franck Ngoan	24.72
4	(Germany) Ilja Smorguner	23.94	(Azerbaijan) Roman Heydarov	24.46

=== Finals ===
Final
(Spain) Damián Quintero	26.62
(Turkey) Ali Sofuoğlu	27.34

Bronze medal
(Switzerland) Yuki Ujihara	25.06
(France) Franck Ngoan	24.40
(Hungary) Botond Nagy	24.94
(Italy) Mattia Busato	25.60
