= 2021 World Karate Championships – Men's individual kata =

World Karate Championship

Men's individual kata at the 2021 World Karate Championships
- Venue: Hamdan Sports Complex
- Location: Dubai, United Arab Emirates
- Dates: 18–20 November
- Competitors: 64 from 64 nations

Medalists
gold medal	Ryo Kiyuna	Japan
silver medal	Damián Quintero	Spain
bronze medal	Mattia Busato	Italy
bronze medal	Ali Sofuoğlu	Turkey

The Men's individual kata competition at the 2021 World Karate Championships was held from 18 to 20 November 2021.

== Results ==
=== Round 1 ===
Rank	Pool 1		Pool 2		Pool 3		Pool 4	
Rank	Athlete	Total	Athlete	Total	Athlete	Total	Athlete	Total
1	(France) Franck Ngoan	23.74	(Italy) Mattia Busato	25.26	(Slovakia) Pavol Szolár	25.06	(Spain) Damián Quintero	26.82
2	(North Macedonia) Aleksandar Nedelkovski	23.52	(Switzerland) Yuki Ujihara	23.86	(India) Arka Banerjee	24.12	(Peru) Mariano Wong	23.24
3	(Ukraine) Yaroslav Fedorov	22.80	(Romania) Petru Comănescu	23.82	(Hungary) Botond Nagy	23.80	(Philippines) John Enrico Vasquez	22.52
4	(South Africa) Jesse Sim	22.68	(Poland) Maksymilian Szczypkowski	23.46	(Republic of Ireland) David Gannon	23.34	(Serbia) Uroš Subota	22.24
5	(Panama) Héctor Cención	22.62	Konstantin Sutiagin	23.40	(Iraq) Salih Binar Hama	22.86	(Mexico) Ahxel Tepal	22.08
6	(Bosnia and Herzegovina) Senaid Veladžić	21.88	(Colombia) Luis Aguilar	23.02	(Greece) Lamprinos Marios Markesinis	22.82	(Algeria) Abdelhakim Haoua	21.86
7	(Luxembourg) Patrick Marques	21.62	(Austria) Patrick Valet	21.48	(England) James Harrison	21.94	(Scotland) Jordan Szafranek	21.24
8	(Uzbekistan) Khamdamjon Shodibekov	21.14	(Turkmenistan) Baýram Ýalkabow	18.96	(Canada) William Claveau	21.26	(Pakistan) Naimatullah Habib	20.90
9	(San Marino) Matteo Mucciolil	DNS			(Tunisia) Bilel Salimi	20.66		
Rank	Pool 5		Pool 6		Pool 7		Pool 8	
Rank	Athlete	Total	Athlete	Total	Athlete	Total	Athlete	Total
1	(Germany) Ilja Smorguner	25.48	(Turkey) Ali Sofuoğlu	25.54	(Australia) Shaun Yuen	23.76	(Japan) Ryo Kiyuna	27.86
2	Ahmad Zigi Zaresta Yuda	24.64	(Azerbaijan) Roman Heydarov	24.34	(Hong Kong) Howard Hung	23.54	(United States) Gakuji Tozaki	25.60
3	(Kuwait) Mohammad Al-Mosawi	24.28	(Sweden) Khai Truong	23.40	(Morocco) Adnane El Hakimi	22.70	(South Korea) Park Hee-jun	22.92
4	(Egypt) Karim Waleed Ghaly	24.24	(Chinese Taipei) Chen Chao-ching	23.28	(Brazil) Rafael Santos	21.74	(Singapore) Eden Yuteng Ang	21.52
5	(Latvia) Kirils Membo	23.74	(Kazakhstan) Madi Kateshov	23.02	(Lithuania) Dovydas Žymantas	21.66	(Oman) Ali Al-Raisi	21.22
6	(United Arab Emirates) Marwan Al-Maazmi	23.46	(Saudi Arabia) Mesfer Al-Asmari	22.68	(Armenia) Mikhayil Mkhitaryan	20.74	(Bangladesh) Md Hasan Khan	19.56
7	(Montenegro) Vladimir Mijač	23.24	(Iceland) Þórður Jökull Henrysson	22.02	(Chile) Luis Aros	20.32	(Kenya) Labib Mohamed	19.08
8	(Botswana) Kagiso Mophuting	21.52	(Cameroon) Pierre Clery Aboya Baya	20.86	(Croatia) Matija Relić	DNS	(El Salvador) Mario López	DNS
9	(Bolivia) Leandro Subirana	20.86						

=== Round 2 ===
Rank	Pool 1		Pool 2		Pool 3		Pool 4	
Rank	Athlete	Total	Athlete	Total	Athlete	Total	Athlete	Total
1	(Italy) Mattia Busato	25.06	(Spain) Damián Quintero	27.20	(Turkey) Ali Sofuoğlu	25.88	(Japan) Ryo Kiyuna	26.52
2	(France) Franck Ngoan	24.70	(Slovakia) Pavol Szolár	25.32	Ahmad Zigi Zaresta Yuda	25.48	(United States) Gakuji Tozaki	25.88
3	(Switzerland) Yuki Ujihara	24.60	(Peru) Mariano Wong	24.80	(Azerbaijan) Roman Heydarov	25.14	(Australia) Shaun Yuen	24.14
4	(North Macedonia) Aleksandar Nedelkovski	24.00	(Hungary) Botond Nagy	24.12	(Germany) Ilja Smorguner	24.82	(South Korea) Park Hee-jun	23.86
5	(Ukraine) Yaroslav Fedorov	23.14	(Serbia) Uroš Subota	23.00	(Egypt) Karim Waleed Ghaly	24.18	(Hong Kong) Howard Hung	23.62
6	(South Africa) Jesse Sim	22.34	(India) Arka Banerjee	22.92	(Sweden) Khai Truong	23.80	(Morocco) Adnane El Hakimi	23.08
7	(Romania) Petru Comănescu	22.20	(Philippines) John Enrico Vasquez	22.66	(Kuwait) Mohammad Al-Mosawi	23.48	(Brazil) Rafael Santos	22.38
8	(Poland) Maksymilian Szczypkowski	21.60	(Republic of Ireland) David Gannon	22.24	(Chinese Taipei) Chen Chao-ching	23.34	(Singapore) Eden Yuteng Ang	22.38

=== Round 3 ===
Rank	Pool 1		Pool 2	
Rank	Athlete	Total	Athlete	Total
1	(Spain) Damián Quintero	27.28	(Japan) Ryo Kiyuna	27.00
2	(Italy) Mattia Busato	26.26	(Turkey) Ali Sofuoğlu	26.12
3	(Switzerland) Yuki Ujihara	25.06	(United States) Gakuji Tozaki	25.20
4	(North Macedonia) Aleksandar Nedelkovski	24.48	(South Korea) Park Hee-jun	24.18
5	(Slovakia) Pavol Szolár	24.32	Ahmad Zigi Zaresta Yuda	24.04
6	(France) Franck Ngoan	24.14	(Germany) Ilja Smorguner	24.00
7	(Peru) Mariano Wong	23.26	(Azerbaijan) Roman Heydarov	23.76
8	(Hungary) Botond Nagy	23.18	(Australia) Shaun Yuen	22.52

=== Finals ===
Final
(Spain) Damián Quintero	26.66
(Japan) Ryo Kiyuna	28.38

Bronze medal
(Italy) Mattia Busato	26.32
(United States) Gakuji Tozaki	25.54
(Switzerland) Yuki Ujihara	25.60
(Turkey) Ali Sofuoğlu	26.92
