= 2023 European Karate Championships – Men's individual kata =

European Karate Championship

Men's individual kata at the 2023 European Karate Championships
- Venue: Palacio Multiusos de Guadalajara
- Location: Guadalajara, Spain
- Dates: 22, 25 March
- Competitors: 32 from 32 nations

Medalists
gold medal	Damián Quintero	Spain
silver medal	Mattia Busato	Italy
bronze medal	Kutluhan Duran	Turkey
bronze medal	Yuki Ujihara	Switzerland

The Men's individual kata competition at the 2023 European Karate Championships was held on 22 and 25 March 2023.

== Results ==
=== Round 1 ===
Rank	Pool 1		Pool 2		Pool 3		Pool 4	
Rank	Athlete	Total	Athlete	Total	Athlete	Total	Athlete	Total
1	(Italy) Mattia Busato	41.4	(Montenegro) Vladimir Mijač	40.5	(Turkey) Kutluhan Duran	40.2	(Spain) Damián Quintero	41.8
2	(Hungary) Botond Nagy	41.2	(Switzerland) Yuki Ujihara	40.2	(Azerbaijan) Roman Heydarov	40.0	(Germany) Ilja Smorguner	39.4
3	(Serbia) Uroš Subota	40.6	(Ukraine) Yaroslav Fedorov	39.3	(Sweden) Anthony Vu	39.2	(Slovakia) Pavol Szolár	39.3
4	(Croatia) Matija Relić	40.1	(Bosnia and Herzegovina) Tarik Salkić	37.7	(France) Franck Ngoan	38.2	(Romania) Petru Comănescu	38.5
5	(North Macedonia) Kristijan Bajovski	39.1	(Slovenia) Nejc Sterniša	37.4	(Czech Republic) Matteo Tamborlani	37.2	(England) Nat Hearn	36.8
6	(Portugal) David Fernandes	38.4	(Netherlands) Mitchell Beckers	36.8	(Bulgaria) Penyo Penev	36.1	(Republic of Ireland) David Gannon	35.5
7	(Latvia) Kirils Membo	37.7	(Poland) Maksymilian Szczypkowski	36.0	(Austria) Patrick Valet	36.0	(Andorra) Silvio Moreira	35.2
8	(Greece) Lamprinos Marios Markesinis	36.9	(Liechtenstein) Antonio Pagliarulo	31.2	(Norway) Ruben Fagerland	35.9	(Iceland) Þórður Jökull Henrysson	34.8

=== Round 2 ===
Rank	Pool 1		Pool 2	
Rank	Athlete	Total	Athlete	Total
1	(Switzerland) Yuki Ujihara	41.2	(Spain) Damián Quintero	42.6
2	(Italy) Mattia Busato	40.5	(Turkey) Kutluhan Duran	40.7
3	(Hungary) Botond Nagy	40.4	(France) Franck Ngoan	40.3
4	(Montenegro) Vladimir Mijač	38.4	(Sweden) Anthony Vu	39.6
5	(Ukraine) Yaroslav Fedorov	37.6	(Azerbaijan) Roman Heydarov	39.5
6	(Croatia) Matija Relić	37.6	(Romania) Petru Comănescu	39.0
7	(Serbia) Uroš Subota	37.0	(Slovakia) Pavol Szolár	38.9
8	(Bosnia and Herzegovina) Tarik Salkić	36.9	(Germany) Ilja Smorguner	38.5

=== Round 3 ===
Rank	Pool 1		Pool 2	
Rank	Athlete	Total	Athlete	Total
1	(Italy) Mattia Busato	40.4	(Spain) Damián Quintero	42.6
2	(Hungary) Botond Nagy	39.9	(Sweden) Anthony Vu	41.2
3	(Switzerland) Yuki Ujihara	39.8	(Turkey) Kutluhan Duran	40.9
4	(Montenegro) Vladimir Mijač	38.6	(France) Franck Ngoan	39.5

=== Finals ===
Final
(Italy) Mattia Busato	42.2
(Spain) Damián Quintero	43.5

Bronze medal
(Hungary) Botond Nagy	42.3
(Turkey) Kutluhan Duran	42.4
(Switzerland) Yuki Ujihara	41.8
(Sweden) Anthony Vu	41.2
