= 2024 European Karate Championships – Men's individual kata =

European Karate Championship

Men's individual kata at the 2024 European Karate Championships
- Venue: Krešimir Ćosić Hall
- Location: Zadar, Croatia
- Dates: 8, 11 May
- Competitors: 33 from 33 nations

Medalists
gold medal	Ali Sofuoğlu	Turkey
silver medal	Damián Quintero	Spain
bronze medal	Anthony Vu	Sweden
bronze medal	Alessio Ghinami	Italy

The men's individual kata competition at the 2024 European Karate Championships was held on 8 and 11 May 2024.

== Results ==
=== Final ===
Final
(Spain) Damián Quintero	42.40
(Turkey) Ali Sofuoğlu	43.90

=== Top half ===
Round of 64
	Score	
(Denmark) Mark Løytved	37.50–38.40	(Latvia) Kirils Membo

Round of 32
(Latvia) Kirils Membo	37.70
(Azerbaijan) Roman Heydarov	39.90
(Czech Republic) Matteo Tamborlani	37.60
(Germany) Lukas Grimm	39.20
(Slovakia) Roman Hrčka	39.00
(Poland) Wojciech Niedziela	37.20
(Switzerland) Yuki Ujihara	39.80
(Italy) Alessio Ghinami	41.20
(Netherlands) Mitchell Beckers	36.80
(Authorised Neutral Athletes) Maksim Bareika	37.60
(Andorra) Silvio Moreira	37.20
(Liechtenstein) Antonio Pagliarulo	34.60
(England) James Harrison	39.10
(Bosnia and Herzegovina) Senaid Veladžić	32.70
(Ukraine) Yaroslav Fedorov	38.80
(Spain) Damián Quintero	42.20

Round of 16
(Azerbaijan) Roman Heydarov	40.00
(Germany) Lukas Grimm	39.30
(Slovakia) Roman Hrčka	41.30
(Italy) Alessio Ghinami	43.20
(Authorised Neutral Athletes) Maksim Bareika	37.70
(Andorra) Silvio Moreira	37.60
(England) James Harrison	38.20
(Spain) Damián Quintero	41.10

Quarterfinals
(Azerbaijan) Roman Heydarov	42.50
(Italy) Alessio Ghinami	42.90
(Authorised Neutral Athletes) Maksim Bareika	36.60
(Spain) Damián Quintero	41.60

Semifinals
(Italy) Alessio Ghinami	41.90
(Spain) Damián Quintero	43.00

=== Bottom half ===
Round of 32
(Kosovo) Ventor Gjuka	36.00
(Sweden) Anthony Vu	39.20
(France) Franck Ngoan	38.40
(Croatia) Dino Huić	38.20
(Montenegro) Vladimir Mijač	38.80
(Greece) Lamprinos Markesinis	36.70
(Iceland) Þórður Jökull Henrysson	36.00
(Hungary) Botond Nagy	39.00
(Bulgaria) Georgi Matuski	36.40
(Romania) Petru Comănescu	39.00
(North Macedonia) Kristijan Bajovski	33.70
(Austria) Florian Zöchling	36.90
(Slovenia) Jure Sluga	38.50
(Portugal) Artur Neto	39.70
(Serbia) Uroš Subota	37.80
(Turkey) Ali Sofuoğlu	39.60

Round of 16
(Sweden) Anthony Vu	39.50
(France) Franck Ngoan	36.80
(Montenegro) Vladimir Mijač	40.00
(Hungary) Botond Nagy	39.70
(Romania) Petru Comănescu	38.60
(Austria) Florian Zöchling	36.00
(Portugal) Artur Neto	39.10
(Turkey) Ali Sofuoğlu	40.10

Quarterfinals
(Sweden) Anthony Vu	40.70
(Montenegro) Vladimir Mijač	40.50
(Romania) Petru Comănescu	39.60
(Turkey) Ali Sofuoğlu	41.70

Semifinals
(Sweden) Anthony Vu	40.40
(Turkey) Ali Sofuoğlu	42.40

=== Repechage ===
Repechage round 1
(England) James Harrison	37.90
(Ukraine) Yaroslav Fedorov	39.40
(Serbia) Uroš Subota	39.10
(Portugal) Artur Neto	39.70

Repechage round 2
(Authorised Neutral Athletes) Maksim Bareika	37.90
(Ukraine) Yaroslav Fedorov	39.80
(Romania) Petru Comănescu	38.90
(Portugal) Artur Neto	39.30

Bronze medals
(Italy) Alessio Ghinami	43.50
(Ukraine) Yaroslav Fedorov	40.90
(Sweden) Anthony Vu	41.70
(Portugal) Artur Neto	41.00
