= 2021 World Karate Championships – Men's team kata =

World Karate Championship

Men's team kata at the 2021 World Karate Championships
- Venue: Hamdan Sports Complex
- Location: Dubai, United Arab Emirates
- Dates: 19–21 November
- Competitors: 63 from 21 nations
- Teams: 21

Medalists
gold medal	Koji Arimoto; Kazumasa Moto; Ryuji Moto	Japan
silver medal	Sergio Galán; Alejandro Manzana; Raúl Martín	Spain
bronze medal	Mattia Busato; Gianluca Gallo; Alessandro Iodice	Italy
bronze medal	Emre Vefa Göktaş; Enes Özdemir; Ali Sofuoğlu	Turkey

The Men's team kata competition at the 2021 World Karate Championships was held from 19 to 21 November 2021.

== Results ==
=== Round 1 ===
Rank	Pool 1		Pool 2	
Rank	Team	Total	Team	Total
1	Italy	25.26	Japan	26.94
2	Spain	25.20	Turkey	26.20
3	France	24.46	Morocco	24.40
4	Brazil	23.60	Kuwait	24.40
5	INAKF	23.18	RKF	23.74
6	Peru	22.58	Azerbaijan	23.66
7	Algeria	22.06	Egypt	23.12
8	Poland	21.74	Montenegro	22.78
9	Croatia	21.54	Colombia	22.38
10	DR Congo	19.82	Iraq	21.64
11	United Arab Emirates	DNS	India	19.32

=== Round 2 ===
Rank	Pool 1		Pool 2	
Rank	Team	Total	Team	Total
1	Spain	25.92	Japan	26.46
2	Italy	25.08	Turkey	26.20
3	France	24.32	Morocco	25.12
4	Brazil	23.06	Kuwait	24.32

=== Finals ===
Final
Spain	26.08
Japan	28.28

Bronze medal
Italy	25.86
Morocco	24.60
France	25.22
Turkey	26.16
