= 2024 European Karate Championships – Men's team kata =

European Karate Championship

Men's team kata at the 2024 European Karate Championships
- Venue: Krešimir Ćosić Hall
- Location: Zadar, Croatia
- Dates: 9, 12 May
- Nations: 16
- Teams: 16

Medalists
gold medal	Ali Sofuoğlu; Emre Vefa Göktaş; Enes Özdemir	Turkey
silver medal	Salvador Cisneros; Sergio Galán; Raúl Martín; Damián Quintero	Spain
bronze medal	Mattia Busato; Gianluca Gallo; Alessio Ghinami; Alessandro Iodice	Italy
bronze medal	Rovshan Aliyev; Ismayil Guliyev; Hasanali Hasanov; Roman Heydarov	Azerbaijan

The men's team kata competition at the 2024 European Karate Championships was held on 9 and 12 May 2024.

== Results ==
Round of 16
Switzerland	38.00
Croatia	39.60
Sweden	38.90
Italy	40.70
France	39.90
Bosnia and Herzegovina	37.90
Poland	39.00
Spain	41.40
Germany	38.90
Czech Republic	38.60
Serbia	36.00
Montenegro	38.70
North Macedonia	37.00
Austria	36.20
Azerbaijan	39.80
Turkey	41.80

Quarterfinals
Croatia	39.30
Italy	40.70
France	38.60
Spain	41.10
Germany	39.90
Montenegro	40.10
North Macedonia	36.30
Turkey	40.20

Semifinals
Italy	40.90
Spain	42.40
Montenegro	39.00
Turkey	41.90

Final
Spain	44.00
Turkey	44.40

Repechage round 1
North Macedonia	37.70
Azerbaijan	40.40
Poland	38.60
France	40.40

Bronze medal match
Montenegro	40.60
Azerbaijan	41.10
Italy	42.70
France	41.70
