= 2023 European Karate Championships – Men's team kata =

European Karate Championship

Men's team kata at the 2023 European Karate Championships
- Venue: Palacio Multiusos de Guadalajara
- Location: Guadalajara, Spain
- Dates: 23, 26 March
- Nations: 11
- Teams: 11

Medalists
gold medal	Ali Sofuoğlu; Emre Vefa Göktaş; Enes Özdemir; Furkan Kaynar	Turkey
silver medal	Sergio Galán; Óscar García; Alejandro Manzana; Raúl Martín	Spain
bronze medal	Arijan Kočan; Vladimir Mijač; Nikola Milić; Kenan Nikočević	Montenegro
bronze medal	Mattia Busato; Gianluca Gallo; Alessandro Iodice	Italy

The Men's team kata competition at the 2023 European Karate Championships was held from 23 and 26 March 2023.

== Results ==
=== Round 1 ===
Rank	Pool 1		Pool 2	
Rank	Team	Total	Team	Total
1	Spain	41.5	Turkey	41.9
2	Azerbaijan	39.4	Italy	41.3
3	Montenegro	39.1	England	38.4
4	France	39.0	North Macedonia	37.8
5	Croatia	36.8	Hungary	37.1
6	Ukraine	35.9		

=== Round 2 ===
Rank	Pool 1		Pool 2	
Rank	Team	Total	Team	Total
1	Spain	41.6	Turkey	41.7
2	Montenegro	39.1	Italy	41.0
3	France	39.0	England	38.3
4	Azerbaijan	38.6	North Macedonia	36.8

=== Finals ===
Final
Spain	43.6
Turkey	44.2

Bronze medal
Montenegro	42.6
England	40.4
France	41.7
Italy	42.9
