= 2019 European Karate Championships =

- Venue: Palacio Multiusos de Guadalajara
- Location: Guadalajara, Spain
- Dates: 28–31 May
- Competitors: 559 from 51 nations

The 2019 European Karate Championships were the 54th edition of the European Karate Championships, and were held in Guadalajara, Spain from 28 to 31 May 2019.

== Medal table ==
* Host nation (Spain)

Rank	Nation	Gold	Silver	Bronze	Total
1	Spain*	5	0	1	6
2	Turkey	3	4	4	11
3	France	3	0	1	4
4	Italy	1	3	4	8
5	Russia	1	0	2	3
5	Ukraine	1	0	2	3
7	Germany	1	0	1	2
8	Luxembourg	1	0	0	1
9	Serbia	0	2	1	3
10	Azerbaijan	0	1	2	3
11	Austria	0	1	1	2
11	Montenegro	0	1	1	2
13	Belarus	0	1	0	1
13	Greece	0	1	0	1
13	Slovenia	0	1	0	1
13	Switzerland	0	1	0	1
17	Croatia	0	0	3	3
18	Bulgaria	0	0	1	1
18	Denmark	0	0	1	1
18	England	0	0	1	1
18	Finland	0	0	1	1
18	Hungary	0	0	1	1
18	North Macedonia	0	0	1	1
18	Portugal	0	0	1	1
18	Scotland	0	0	1	1
18	Slovakia	0	0	1	1
Totals (26 entries)		16	16	32	64

== Medalists ==
=== Men ===
Event	Gold	Silver	Bronze
Kata	Damián Quintero; Spain	Ali Sofuoğlu; Turkey	Mattia Busato; Italy
Kata	Damián Quintero; Spain	Ali Sofuoğlu; Turkey	Roman Heydarov; Azerbaijan
Team kata	Spain; José Carbonell; Sergio Galán; Francisco Salazar	Turkey; Kutluhan Duran; Emre Vefa Göktaş; Ali Sofuoğlu	Russia; Maksim Ksenofontov; Mehman Rzaev; Emil Skovorodnikov
Team kata	Spain; José Carbonell; Sergio Galán; Francisco Salazar	Turkey; Kutluhan Duran; Emre Vefa Göktaş; Ali Sofuoğlu	Italy; Gianluca Gallo; Alessandro Iodice; Giuseppe Panagia
Kumite −60 kg	Evgeny Plakhutin; Russia	Angelo Crescenzo; Italy	Eray Şamdan; Turkey
Kumite −60 kg	Evgeny Plakhutin; Russia	Angelo Crescenzo; Italy	Emil Pavlov; North Macedonia
Kumite −67 kg	Steven Da Costa; France	Mario Hodžić; Montenegro	Yves Martial Tadissi; Hungary
Kumite −67 kg	Steven Da Costa; France	Mario Hodžić; Montenegro	Stefan Pokorny; Austria
Kumite −75 kg	Luigi Busà; Italy	Rafael Aghayev; Azerbaijan	Joe Kellaway; England
Kumite −75 kg	Luigi Busà; Italy	Rafael Aghayev; Azerbaijan	Stanislav Horuna; Ukraine
Kumite −84 kg	Uğur Aktaş; Turkey	Anton Isakau; Belarus	Ivan Kvesić; Croatia
Kumite −84 kg	Uğur Aktaş; Turkey	Anton Isakau; Belarus	Nikola Malović; Montenegro
Kumite +84 kg	Jonathan Horne; Germany	Slobodan Bitević; Serbia	Anđelo Kvesić; Croatia
Kumite +84 kg	Jonathan Horne; Germany	Slobodan Bitević; Serbia	Asiman Gurbanli; Azerbaijan
Team kumite	Turkey; Uğur Aktaş; Enes Bulut; Muratcan Deniz; Erman Eltemur; Murat Öz; Burak Uygur; Alparslan Yamanoğlu	Serbia; Vladimir Brežančić; Ljubiša Marić; Marko Martinović; Uroš Mijalković; Đorđe Salapura; Đorđe Tešanović; Bogdan Trikoš	Spain; Pablo Arenas; Raúl Cuerva; Matías Gómez; Rodrigo Ibáñez; Marcos Martínez; Alejandro Molina; Babacar Seck
Team kumite	Turkey; Uğur Aktaş; Enes Bulut; Muratcan Deniz; Erman Eltemur; Murat Öz; Burak Uygur; Alparslan Yamanoğlu	Serbia; Vladimir Brežančić; Ljubiša Marić; Marko Martinović; Uroš Mijalković; Đorđe Salapura; Đorđe Tešanović; Bogdan Trikoš	Croatia; Enes Garibović; Anđelo Kvesić; Ivan Kvesić; Ivan Martinac; Ante Mrvičić; Stjepan Štimac; Zvonimir Živković

=== Women ===
Event	Gold	Silver	Bronze
Kata	Sandra Sánchez; Spain	Viviana Bottaro; Italy	Alexandra Feracci; France
Kata	Sandra Sánchez; Spain	Viviana Bottaro; Italy	Dilara Bozan; Turkey
Team kata	Spain; Lidia Rodríguez; Raquel Roy; Marta Vega	Italy; Carola Casale; Terryana D'Onofrio; Michela Pezzetti	Portugal; Mariana Belo; Ana Cruz; Patrícia Esparteiro
Team kata	Spain; Lidia Rodríguez; Raquel Roy; Marta Vega	Italy; Carola Casale; Terryana D'Onofrio; Michela Pezzetti	Russia; Polina Kotlyarova; Irina Troitskaya; Maria Zotova
Kumite −50 kg	Sophia Bouderbane; France	Bettina Plank; Austria	Jelena Milivojčević; Serbia
Kumite −50 kg	Sophia Bouderbane; France	Bettina Plank; Austria	Serap Özçelik; Turkey
Kumite −55 kg	Jennifer Warling; Luxembourg	Tuba Yakan; Turkey	Amy Connell; Scotland
Kumite −55 kg	Jennifer Warling; Luxembourg	Tuba Yakan; Turkey	Ivet Goranova; Bulgaria
Kumite −61 kg	Merve Çoban; Turkey	Tjaša Ristić; Slovenia	Anita Serogina; Ukraine
Kumite −61 kg	Merve Çoban; Turkey	Tjaša Ristić; Slovenia	Ingrida Suchánková; Slovakia
Kumite −68 kg	Alizée Agier; France	Elena Quirici; Switzerland	Silvia Semeraro; Italy
Kumite −68 kg	Alizée Agier; France	Elena Quirici; Switzerland	Katrine Pedersen; Denmark
Kumite +68 kg	Laura Palacio; Spain	Eleni Chatziliadou; Greece	Meltem Hocaoğlu; Turkey
Kumite +68 kg	Laura Palacio; Spain	Eleni Chatziliadou; Greece	Titta Keinänen; Finland
Team kumite	Ukraine; Halyna Melnyk; Anita Serogina; Diana Shostak; Anzhelika Terliuga	Turkey; Yıldız Aras; Merve Çoban; Eda Eltemur; Meltem Hocaoğlu	Italy; Lorena Busà; Clio Ferracuti; Laura Pasqua; Silvia Semeraro
Team kumite	Ukraine; Halyna Melnyk; Anita Serogina; Diana Shostak; Anzhelika Terliuga	Turkey; Yıldız Aras; Merve Çoban; Eda Eltemur; Meltem Hocaoğlu	Germany; Jana Bitsch; Shara Hubrich; Johanna Kneer; Madeleine Schröter

== Participating nations ==
559 athletes from 51 nations competed.

- Albania (4)
- Andorra (1)
- Armenia (6)
- Austria (16)
- Azerbaijan (18)
- Belarus (18)
- Belgium (11)
- Bosnia and Herzegovina (16)
- Bulgaria (5)
- Croatia (22)
- Cyprus (2)
- Czech Republic (9)
- Denmark (12)
- England (19)
- Estonia (3)
- Finland (7)
- France (22)
- Georgia (5)
- Germany (15)
- Greece (12)
- Hungary (14)
- Iceland (2)
- Ireland (8)
- Israel (7)
- Italy (22)
- Kosovo (10)
- Latvia (10)
- Liechtenstein (1)
- Lithuania (6)
- Luxembourg (5)
- Moldova (3)
- Montenegro (15)
- Netherlands (12)
- North Macedonia (13)
- Northern Ireland (1)
- Norway (7)
- Poland (13)
- Portugal (21)
- Romania (13)
- Russia (21)
- San Marino (1)
- Scotland (5)
- Serbia (24)
- Slovakia (15)
- Slovenia (5)
- Spain (21)
- Sweden (11)
- Switzerland (11)
- Turkey (18)
- Ukraine (17)
- Wales (4)

== Para Karate ==
46 athletes from 16 nations in 6 events was competed in 2nd European Para Karate Championships. Results:

Rank	Nation	Gold	Silver	Bronze	Total
1	Spain	4	1	2	7
2	France	1	0	3	4
3	Azerbaijan	1	0	0	1
4	Russia	0	1	1	2
5	Estonia	0	1	0	1
5	Georgia	0	1	0	1
5	Hungary	0	1	0	1
5	Ukraine	0	1	0	1
Totals (8 entries)		6	6	6	18
