= 2022 European Karate Championships – Men's team kata =

European Karate Championships

Men's team kata at the 2022 European Karate Championships
- Venue: Karataş Şahinbey Sport Hall
- Location: Gaziantep, Turkey
- Dates: 26–29 May
- Competitors: 30 from 10 nations
- Teams: 10

Medalists
gold medal	Emre Vefa Göktaş; Enes Özdemir; Ali Sofuoğlu	Turkey
silver medal	Sergio Galán; Óscar García; Alejandro Manzana	Spain
bronze medal	Mattia Busato; Gianluca Gallo; Alessandro Iodice	Italy
bronze medal	Rovshan Aliyev; Tural Baljanli; Ismayil Guliyev	Azerbaijan

The Men's team kata competition at the 2022 European Karate Championships was held from 26 to 29 May 2022.

== Results ==
=== Round 1 ===
Rank	Pool 1		Pool 2	
Rank	Team	Total	Team	Total
1	Spain	25.32	Turkey	25.54
2	Italy	25.06	Azerbaijan	24.26
3	Croatia	23.26	Montenegro	22.44
4	North Macedonia	22.52	France	20.94
5	Romania	21.82	Bosnia and Herzegovina	19.94

=== Finals ===
Final
Spain	26.02
Turkey	26.80

Bronze medal
Italy	25.72
Montenegro	24.06
Croatia	23.46
Azerbaijan	25.38
