= 2018 World Karate Championships – Men's individual kata =

Karate competition

Men's individual kata at the 2018 World Karate Championships
- Location: Madrid, Spain
- Dates: 6-10 November
- Competitors: 79

The preliminaries and repechages of the Men's individual kata competition at the 2018 World Karate Championships were held on November 6, 2018, and the finals on November 10, 2018.

== Results ==
=== Finals ===
Semi-finals
(Venezuela) Antonio Diaz	0
(Spain) Damián Quintero	5
(Germany) Ilja Smorguner	0
(Japan) Ryo Kiyuna	5

Final
(Spain) Damián Quintero	0
(Japan) Ryo Kiyuna	5

=== Repechage ===
Repechage round 1
(Mexico) Waldo Ramirez	2
(Turkey) Ali Sofuoğlu	3
(Wales) Lloyd Birt	2
(Egypt) Ahmed Shawky	3

Repechage round 2
(Turkey) Ali Sofuoğlu	5
(Colombia) David Contreras	0
(Egypt) Ahmed Shawky	0
(Kuwait) Sayed Mohammad Almosawi	5

Repechage round 3
(Turkey) Ali Sofuoğlu	5
(France) Enzo Montarello	0
(Kuwait) Sayed Mohammad Almosawi	2
(Italy) Mattia Busato	3

Bronze medals
(Turkey) Ali Sofuoğlu	5
(Venezuela) Antonio Díaz	0
(Italy) Mattia Busato	4
(Germany) Ilja Smorguner	1

=== Pool A ===
Preliminary round fights

	Score	
Jesse Enkamp (Finland)	2–3	(North Macedonia) Ferri Isic
Wael Shueb Refugee Karate Team	2–3	(Andorra) Silvio Moreira
Patrick Valet (Austria)	3–2	(Latvia) Kirils Membo
Jorge Caeiros (Portugal)	4–1	(South Korea) Park Hee-jun

First round
(North Macedonia) Ferri Isic	3
(Algeria) Mouad Ouites	2
(Kazakhstan) Madi Kateshov	3
(Czech Republic) Matej Riha	2
(Andorra) Silvio Moreira	3
(United Arab Emirates) Amin Alawadhi	2
(Hungary) Botond Nagy	5
(Iceland) Aron Anh Huynh	0
(Austria) Patrick Valet	5
(Trinidad and Tobago) Zachary Alexander	0
(Qatar) Adham Hashem	0
(Poland) Bartosz Maczka	5
(Portugal) Jorge Caeiros	2
(Romania) Adrian Razvan Guta	3
(Peru) Mariano Wong	2
(Venezuela) Antonio Díaz	3

Second round
(North Macedonia) Ferri Isic	0
(Kazakhstan) Madi Kateshov	5
(Andorra) Silvio Moreira	0
(Hungary) Botond Nagy	5
(Austria) Patrick Valet	2
(Poland) Bartosz Maczka	3
(Romania) Adrian Razvan Guta	1
(Venezuela) Antonio Díaz	4

Third round
(Kazakhstan) Madi Kateshov	3
(Hungary) Botond Nagy	2
(Poland) Bartosz Maczka	0
(Venezuela) Antonio Díaz	5

Quarterfinals
(Kazakhstan) Madi Kateshov	0
(Venezuela) Antonio Díaz	5

=== Pool B ===
Preliminary round fights

	Score	
Stefan Suvajcevic (Serbia)	5–0	(Palestine) Ahmed Hamdallah
Leonardo Mattei (San Marino)	0–5	(Hong Kong) Tsz Man Chris Cheng
Jordan Szafranek (Scotland)	1–4	(Slovenia) Bor Hartl
Mu Shike (China)	4–1	(England) Christopher Karwacinski

First round
(Serbia) Stefan Suvajcevic	0
(France) Enzo Montarello	5
(Azerbaijan) Roman Heydarov	0
(Dominican Republic) Nykolai Arango	5
(Hong Kong) Tsz Man Chris Cheng	4
(Montenegro) Mijat Vojvodic	1
(Ukraine) Vitaliy Kulyk	4
(India) Arka Banerjee	1
(Slovenia) Bor Hartl	0
(Croatia) Tomislav Stolar	5
(Colombia) David Contreras	5
(Kosovo) Argjend Berjani	0
(China) Mu Shike	0
(Turkey) Ali Sofuoğlu	5
(Mexico) Waldo Ramirez	0
(Spain) Damián Quintero	5

Second round
(France) Enzo Montarello	3
(Dominican Republic) Nykolai Arango	2
(Hong Kong) Tsz Man Chris Cheng	5
(Ukraine) Vitaliy Kulyk	0
(Croatia) Tomislav Stolar	1
(Colombia) David Contreras	4
(Turkey) Ali Sofuoğlu	0
(Spain) Damián Quintero	5

Third round
(France) Enzo Montarello	3
(Hong Kong) Tsz Man Chris Cheng	2
(Colombia) David Contreras	0
(Spain) Damián Quintero	5

Quarterfinals
(France) Enzo Montarello	0
(Spain) Damián Quintero	5

=== Pool C ===
Preliminary round fights

	Score	
Khai Truong (Sweden)	4–1	(Russia) Mehman Rzaev
Amedeo Alessandro Di Giovanni (Belgium)	5–0	(Oman) Ali Al-Raisi
Mario Lopez (El Salvador)	5–0	(Armenia) Mikhayil Mkhitaryan
Luis Carlos das Mercês e Sousa (Mozambique)	5–0	(Cayman Islands) Pedro Branco dos Reis

First round
(Sweden) Khai Truong	4
(Macau) Kin Hang Kuok	1
(Slovakia) Peter Fabian	5
(Moldova) Alexei Garstea	0
(Belgium) Amedeo Alessandro Di Giovanni	5
(Burkina Faso) Allan Sanou	0
(Switzerland) Yuki Ujihara	0
(Iran) Abolfazl Shahrjerdi	5
(El Salvador) Mario Lopez	0
(Panama) Hector Cencion	5
(Costa Rica) Roy Lee Gatjens	0
(Morocco) Adnane Elhakimi	5
(Mozambique) Luis Carlos das Mercês e Sousa	1
(Netherlands) Wouter Deijl	4
(Lithuania) Dovydas Zymantas	0
(Germany) Ilja Smorguner	5

Second round
(Sweden) Khai Truong	3
(Slovakia) Peter Fabian	2
(Belgium) Amedeo Alessandro Di Giovanni	0
(Iran) Abolfazl Shahrjerdi	5
(Panama) Hector Cencion	1
(Morocco) Adnane Elhakimi	4
(Netherlands) Wouter Deijl	0
(Germany) Ilja Smorguner	5

Third round
(Sweden) Khai Truong	0
(Iran) Abolfazl Shahrjerdi	5
(Morocco) Adnane Elhakimi	2
(Germany) Ilja Smorguner	3

Quarterfinals
(Iran) Abolfazl Shahrjerdi	2
(Germany) Ilja Smorguner	3

=== Pool D ===
Preliminary round fights

	Score	
Joseph Martinez (United States)	1–4	(Indonesia) Yuda Zigi Zaresta
Michael Panduleni Nakapandi (Namibia)	0–5	(Brazil) Williames Souza Santos
Michael du Plessis (South Africa)	0–5	(Canada) Kenneth Lee

First round
(Indonesia) Yuda Zigi Zaresta	2
(Italy) Mattia Busato	3
(New Zealand) Isaac Hoshi	5
(Argentina) Walter Carrizo	0
(Brazil) Williames Souza Santos	5
(Saudi Arabia) Mesfer Alasmari	0
(Bosnia and Herzegovina) Sulejman Suljic	0
(Malaysia) Chee Wei Lim	5
(Canada) Kenneth Lee	4
(Australia) Shaun Yuen	1
(Chinese Taipei) Yi Ta Wang	2
(Kuwait) Sayed Mohammad Almosawi	3
(Egypt) Ahmed Shawky	4
(Botswana) Ofentse Bakwadi	1
(Wales) Lloyd Birt	0
(Japan) Ryo Kiyuna	5

Second round
(Italy) Mattia Busato	4
(New Zealand) Isaac Hoshi	1
(Brazil) Williames Souza Santos	0
(Malaysia) Chee Wei Lim	5
(Canada) Kenneth Lee	2
(Kuwait) Sayed Mohammad Almosawi	3
(Egypt) Ahmed Shawky	0
(Japan) Ryo Kiyuna	5

Third round
(Italy) Mattia Busato	3
(Malaysia) Chee Wei Lim	2
(Kuwait) Sayed Mohammad Almosawi	0
(Japan) Ryo Kiyuna	5

Quarterfinals
(Italy) Mattia Busato	0
(Japan) Ryo Kiyuna	5x
