= 2026 European Karate Championships – Men's team kata =

Men's team kata at the 2026 European Karate Championships
- Venue: Eissporthalle Frankfurt
- Location: Frankfurt, Germany
- Dates: 21, 24 May
- Nations: 16
- Teams: 16

Medalists
gold medal	Mattia Busato; Gianluca Gallo; Alessio Ghinami; Alessandro Iodice	Italy
silver medal	Kutluhan Duran; Furkan Kaynar; Ozan Parlak; Muhammed Efe Yurtseven	Turkey
bronze medal	Vasco Mateus; Artur Neto; Martim Oliveira; João Vieira	Portugal
bronze medal	Alejandro Galán; Antonio Lozano; Iván Martín; Raúl Martín	Spain

The men's team kata competition at the 2026 European Karate Championships was held on 21 and 24 May 2026.

== Results ==
=== Bracket ===
Round of 16
Croatia	5
Czech Republic	2
Germany	4
France	3
Azerbaijan	6
Switzerland	1
Portugal	1
Italy	6
Poland	7
England	0
EKF-1	1
Turkey	6
Slovakia	3
Montenegro	4
Hungary	0
Spain	7

Quarterfinals
Croatia	0
Germany	7
Azerbaijan	0
Italy	7
Poland	0
Turkey	7
Montenegro	1
Spain	6

Semifinals
Germany	0
Italy	7
Turkey	4
Spain	3

Final
Italy	6
Turkey	1

=== Repechage ===
Repechage
Portugal	6
Azerbaijan	1

Bronze medal
Portugal	7
Germany	0

Repechage
EKF-1	2
Poland	5

Bronze medal
Poland	0
Spain	7
