= Karate at the 2019 European Games – Men's individual kata =

Men's individual kata at the 2019 European Games
- Venue: Čyžoŭka-Arena
- Date: 29 June
- Competitors: 8 from 8 nations

Medalists
gold medal	Damián Quintero	Spain
silver medal	Ali Sofuoğlu	Turkey
bronze medal	Roman Heydarov	Azerbaijan
bronze medal	Mattia Busato	Italy

The men's individual kata competition at the 2019 European Games in Minsk was held on 29 June 2019 at the Čyžoŭka-Arena.

== Schedule ==
All times are local (UTC+3).

Date	Time	Event
Saturday, 29 June 2019	09:00	Elimination round
Saturday, 29 June 2019	10:20	Ranking round
Saturday, 29 June 2019	15:50	Bronze medal match
Saturday, 29 June 2019	17:35	Gold medal match

== Results ==
=== Elimination round ===
==== Group A ====
Rank	Athlete	Technic	Total	Factor	Result	Total kata	Average total	Notes
1	Damián Quintero (ESP)	Kururunfa	26.0	0.7	18.20	25.82	26.32	Q
1	Damián Quintero (ESP)	Kururunfa	25.4	0.3	7.62	25.82	26.32	Q
1	Damián Quintero (ESP)	Anan	27.0	0.7	18.90	26.82	26.32	Q
1	Damián Quintero (ESP)	Anan	26.4	0.3	7.92	26.82	26.32	Q
2	Ilja Smorguner (GER)	Suparinpei	24.6	0.7	17.22	24.24	24.66	Q
2	Ilja Smorguner (GER)	Suparinpei	23.4	0.7	7.02	24.24	24.66	Q
2	Ilja Smorguner (GER)	Ohan Dai	25.2	0.7	17.64	25.08	24.66	Q
2	Ilja Smorguner (GER)	Ohan Dai	24.8	0.3	7.44	25.08	24.66	Q
3	Enzo Montarello (FRA)	Gojushiho Dai	24.0	0.7	16.80	24.06	23.95	Q
3	Enzo Montarello (FRA)	Gojushiho Dai	24.2	0.3	7.26	24.06	23.95	Q
3	Enzo Montarello (FRA)	Unsu (Unshu)	23.6	0.7	16.52	23.84	23.95	Q
3	Enzo Montarello (FRA)	Unsu (Unshu)	24.4	0.3	7.32	23.84	23.95	Q
4	Aliaksei Tarashkevich (BLR)	Suparinpei	21.8	0.7	15.25	21.73	21.90	
4	Aliaksei Tarashkevich (BLR)	Suparinpei	21.6	0.3	6.48	21.73	21.90	
4	Aliaksei Tarashkevich (BLR)	Papuren	22.2	0.7	15.53	22.07	21.90	
4	Aliaksei Tarashkevich (BLR)	Papuren	21.8	0.3	6.54	22.07	21.90	

==== Group B ====
Rank	Athlete	Technic	Total	Factor	Result	Total kata	Average total	Notes
1	Ali Sofuoğlu (TUR)	Gojushiho Dai	26.0	0.7	18.20	25.94	26.31	Q
1	Ali Sofuoğlu (TUR)	Gojushiho Dai	25.8	0.3	7.74	25.94	26.31	Q
1	Ali Sofuoğlu (TUR)	Unsu (Unshu)	26.8	0.7	18.76	26.68	26.31	Q
1	Ali Sofuoğlu (TUR)	Unsu (Unshu)	26.4	0.3	7.92	26.68	26.31	Q
2	Mattia Busato (ITA)	Gojushiho Dai	25.2	0.7	17.64	25.38	25.65	Q
2	Mattia Busato (ITA)	Gojushiho Dai	25.8	0.3	7.74	25.38	25.65	Q
2	Mattia Busato (ITA)	Gojushiho Sho	25.8	0.7	18.06	25.92	25.65	Q
2	Mattia Busato (ITA)	Gojushiho Sho	26.2	0.3	7.86	25.92	25.65	Q
3	Roman Heydarov (AZE)	Gojushiho Sho	24.4	0.7	17.08	24.46	24.63	Q
3	Roman Heydarov (AZE)	Gojushiho Sho	24.6	0.3	7.38	24.46	24.63	Q
3	Roman Heydarov (AZE)	Gojushiho Dai	24.8	0.7	17.36	24.80	24.63	Q
3	Roman Heydarov (AZE)	Gojushiho Dai	24.8	0.3	7.44	24.80	24.63	Q
4	Silvio Moreira (AND)	Gojushiho Dai	20.4	0.7	14.28	20.16	19.92	
4	Silvio Moreira (AND)	Gojushiho Dai	19.6	0.3	5.88	20.16	19.92	
4	Silvio Moreira (AND)	Unsu (Unshu)	19.8	0.7	13.86	19.68	19.92	
4	Silvio Moreira (AND)	Unsu (Unshu)	19.4	0.3	5.82	19.68	19.92	

=== Ranking round ===
==== Group A ====
Rank	Athlete	Technic	Total	Factor	Result	Total kata	Notes
1	Damián Quintero (ESP)	Suparinpei	27.4	0.7	19.18	27.22	QG
1	Damián Quintero (ESP)	Suparinpei	26.8	0.3	8.04	27.22	QG
2	Ilja Smorguner (GER)	Anan Dai	25.2	0.7	17.64	24.96	QB
2	Ilja Smorguner (GER)	Anan Dai	24.4	0.3	7.32	24.96	QB
3	Enzo Montarello (FRA)	Gojushiho Sho	24.0	0.7	16.80	24.18	QB
3	Enzo Montarello (FRA)	Gojushiho Sho	24.6	0.3	7.38	24.18	QB

==== Group B ====
Rank	Athlete	Technic	Total	Factor	Result	Total kata	Notes
1	Ali Sofuoğlu (TUR)	Gojushiho Sho	27.0	0.7	18.90	27.12	QG
1	Ali Sofuoğlu (TUR)	Gojushiho Sho	27.4	0.3	8.22	27.12	QG
2	Mattia Busato (ITA)	Sansai	26.0	0.7	18.20	26.30	QB
2	Mattia Busato (ITA)	Sansai	27.0	0.3	8.10	26.30	QB
3	Roman Heydarov (AZE)	Gankaku	25.4	0.7	17.78	25.40	QB
3	Roman Heydarov (AZE)	Gankaku	25.4	0.3	7.62	25.40	QB

=== Bronze medal match ===
Rank	Athlete	Technic	Total	Factor	Result	Total kata
5	Ilja Smorguner (GER)		24.6	0.7	17.22	24.54
5	Ilja Smorguner (GER)		24.4	0.3	7.32	24.54
3rd place, bronze medalist(s)	Roman Heydarov (AZE)		25.4	0.7	17.78	25.46
3rd place, bronze medalist(s)	Roman Heydarov (AZE)		25.6	0.3	7.68	25.46

Rank	Athlete	Technic	Total	Factor	Result	Total kata
5	Enzo Montarello (FRA)		24.4	0.7	17.08	24.04
5	Enzo Montarello (FRA)		23.2	0.3	6.96	24.04
3rd place, bronze medalist(s)	Mattia Busato (ITA)		25.6	0.7	17.92	25.60
3rd place, bronze medalist(s)	Mattia Busato (ITA)		25.6	0.3	7.68	25.60

=== Gold medal match ===
Rank	Athlete	Technic	Total	Factor	Result	Total kata
2nd place, silver medalist(s)	Ali Sofuoğlu (TUR)		25.6	0.7	17.92	25.60
2nd place, silver medalist(s)	Ali Sofuoğlu (TUR)		25.6	0.3	7.68	25.60
1st place, gold medalist(s)	Damián Quintero (ESP)		27.0	0.7	18.90	26.88
1st place, gold medalist(s)	Damián Quintero (ESP)		26.6	0.3	7.98	26.88
