= 2023 World Karate Championships – Men's individual kata =

Men's individual kata at the 2023 World Karate Championships
- Venue: László Papp Budapest Sports Arena
- Location: Budapest, Hungary
- Dates: 24, 28 October
- Competitors: 73 from 73 nations

Medalists
gold medal	Ali Sofuoğlu	Turkey
silver medal	Damián Quintero	Spain
bronze medal	Ariel Torres	United States
bronze medal	Kakeru Nishiyama	Japan

The men's individual kata competition at the 2023 World Karate Championships was held on 24 and 28 October 2023.

== Results ==
=== Round 1 ===
Rank	Pool 1		Pool 2		Pool 3		Pool 4	
Rank	Athlete	Total	Athlete	Total	Athlete	Total	Athlete	Total
1	(Italy) Mattia Busato	42.5	(Spain) Damián Quintero	41.9	(Switzerland) Yuki Ujihara	40.4	(United States) Ariel Torres	41.5
2	(France) Franck Ngoan	40.9	(Slovakia) Roman Hrčka	39.5	(Morocco) Salah El Mansoury	39.7	(Azerbaijan) Roman Heydarov	39.4
3	(Latvia) Kirils Membo	39.7	(South Korea) Park Hee-jun	38.5	(Serbia) Uroš Subota	39.1	(Kuwait) Mohammad Al-Mosawi	38.8
4	(Greece) Lamprinos Marios Markesinis	39.5	Konstantin Sutiagin	37.8	(Czech Republic) Matteo Tamborlani	38.3	(Philippines) Jeremy Laurence Nopre	38.2
5	(Indonesia) Ahmad Zigi Zaresta Yuda	38.4	(Kazakhstan) Madi Kateshov	36.8	(Germany) Lukas Grimm	37.9	(Netherlands) Rick Sonnema	37.1
6	(Malaysia) Asmadie Muhammad Aiqal	37.3	(Bosnia and Herzegovina) Tarik Salkić	36.6	(Slovenia) Jure Sluga	37.4	(Peru) Mariano Wong	37.1
7	(Senegal) Omar Diop	37.1	(Australia) Shaun Yuen	35.8	(Norway) Ruben Vinje Fagerland	37.0	(Poland) Piotr Iwaszkiewicz	37.0
8	(Lithuania) Dovydas Žymantas	36.8	(Mexico) Ahxel Tepal	35.5	(Ecuador) Andrés Tejada	36.2	(New Zealand) Isaac Hoshi	37.0
9	(Cayman Islands) Nick Young	34.4	(Iceland) Þórður Jökull Henrysson	34.8	(Canada) Nathan Yuki McNeil	35.9	(Qatar) Adham Hashem	35.8
10	(San Marino) Matteo Mucciolil	30.5						
Rank	Pool 5		Pool 6		Pool 7		Pool 8	
Rank	Athlete	Total	Athlete	Total	Athlete	Total	Athlete	Total
1	(Turkey) Ali Sofuoğlu	41.6	(Egypt) Karim Waleed Ghaly	41.2	(Chinese Taipei) Chen Chao-ching	40.5	(Japan) Kakeru Nishiyama	39.7
2	(Sweden) William Tran	39.1	(Iran) Sadra Shidzi	39.4	(Hong Kong) Howard Hung	40.0	(Hungary) Botond Nagy	38.8
3	(Iraq) Salih Binar Hama	38.0	(Bulgaria) Penyo Penev	38.9	(Venezuela) Cleiver Casanova	39.4	(Ukraine) Yaroslav Fedorov	38.6
4	(Romania) Petru Comănescu	37.9	(Costa Rica) Joshua Núñez	37.3	(Montenegro) Vladimir Mijač	38.7	(England) James Harrison	37.2
5	(Algeria) Saber Ben Makhlouf	37.5	(Brazil) Dyun Thiago Kimura	37.1	(Puerto Rico) Robert Torres	38.3	(Croatia) Matija Relić	37.2
6	(Colombia) Hernán Amaya	37.2	(Republic of Ireland) David Gannon	37.0	(Argentina) Luca Impagnatiello	38.2	(Andorra) Silvio Moreira	36.9
7	(North Macedonia) David Spasovski	36.3	(South Africa) Jesse Sim	36.5	(Portugal) Artur Neto	37.9	(Denmark) David Veistrup	34.0
8	(Kenya) Labib Mohamed	33.1	(Jordan) Kareem Abu Al-Haija	36.2	(Austria) Florian Zöchling	37.2	(India) Aniket Gupta	33.7
9	(Macau) Kuok Kin Hang		(Saudi Arabia) Abdullah Al-Malki	35.3	(Kosovo) Ventor Gjuka	35.0	(Chile) Ankar Alquinta	

=== Round 2 ===
Rank	Pool 1		Pool 2		Pool 3		Pool 4	
Rank	Athlete	Total	Athlete	Total	Athlete	Total	Athlete	Total
1	(Spain) Damián Quintero	43.2	(United States) Ariel Torres	41.3	(Turkey) Ali Sofuoğlu	41.6	(Japan) Kakeru Nishiyama	42.8
2	(Italy) Mattia Busato	42.3	(Azerbaijan) Roman Heydarov	39.5	(Romania) Petru Comănescu	40.1	(Hungary) Botond Nagy	40.0
3	(France) Franck Ngoan	40.7	(Philippines) Jeremy Laurence Nopre	38.2	(Costa Rica) Joshua Núñez	39.5	(Venezuela) Cleiver Casanova	39.8
4	(South Korea) Park Hee-jun	40.2	(Kuwait) Mohammad Al-Mosawi	37.9	(Egypt) Karim Waleed Ghaly	39.1	(Chinese Taipei) Chen Chao-ching	39.7
5	Konstantin Sutiagin	39.4	(Switzerland) Yuki Ujihara	37.7	(Iraq) Salih Binar Hama	38.9	(Hong Kong) Howard Hung	39.6
6	(Slovakia) Roman Hrčka	39.3	(Serbia) Uroš Subota	37.3	(Iran) Sadra Shidzi	38.5	(Montenegro) Vladimir Mijač	39.0
7	(Greece) Lamprinos Marios Markesinis	38.5	(Czech Republic) Matteo Tamborlani	37.1	(Sweden) William Tran	37.4	(Ukraine) Yaroslav Fedorov	38.9
8	(Latvia) Kirils Membo	38.1	(Morocco) Salah El Mansoury	34.6	(Bulgaria) Penyo Penev		(England) James Harrison	38.3

=== Round 3 ===
Rank	Pool 1		Pool 2	
Rank	Athlete	Total	Athlete	Total
1	(Spain) Damián Quintero	43.1	(Turkey) Ali Sofuoğlu	43.5
2	(United States) Ariel Torres	41.7	(Japan) Kakeru Nishiyama	43.3
3	(Italy) Mattia Busato	41.4	(Egypt) Karim Waleed Ghaly	41.3
4	(South Korea) Park Hee-jun	41.1	(Hungary) Botond Nagy	40.4
5	(Azerbaijan) Roman Heydarov	40.7	(Chinese Taipei) Chen Chao-ching	39.5
6	(Kuwait) Mohammad Al-Mosawi	39.7	(Romania) Petru Comănescu	39.1
7	(Philippines) Jeremy Laurence Nopre	38.9	(Venezuela) Cleiver Casanova	39.0
8	(France) Franck Ngoan	38.4	(Costa Rica) Joshua Núñez	38.6

=== Finals ===
Final
(Spain) Damián Quintero	44.5
(Turkey) Ali Sofuoğlu	45.6

Bronze medal
(United States) Ariel Torres	43.2
(Egypt) Karim Waleed Ghaly	42.4
(Italy) Mattia Busato	42.9
(Japan) Kakeru Nishiyama	44.4
