= Ariel Torres =

American karateka (born 1997)

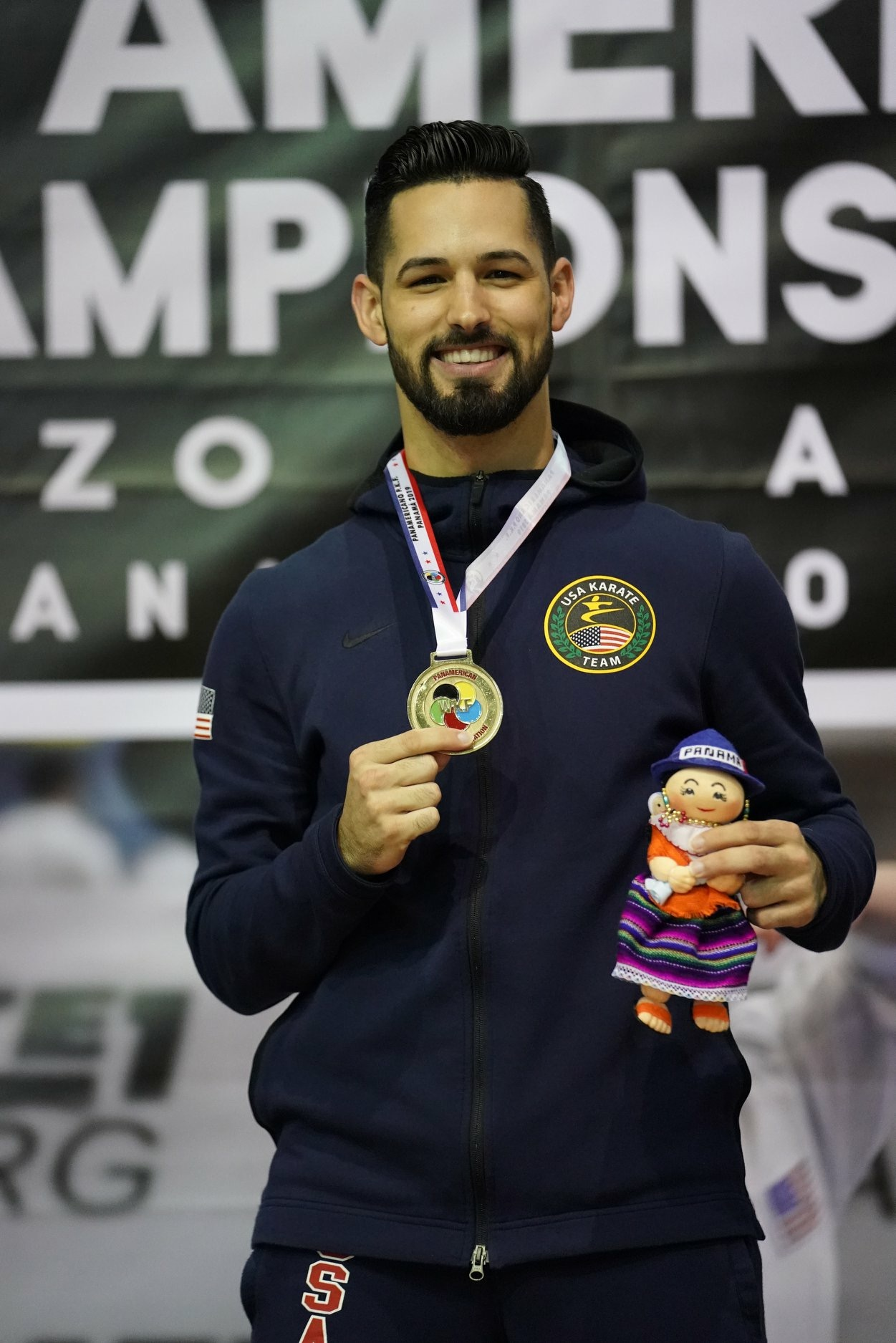
- Torres in 2019

Personal information
- National team: United States of America
- Citizenship: USA
- Born: November 6, 1997 (age 28) Cuba
- Home town: Hialeah
- Education: Westland Hialeah Senior High
- Occupation: Professional Athlete
- Years active: 2006–present
- Employer: USA KARATE
- Height: 173.3 cm (5 ft 8 in)
- Weight: 82 Kg
- Website: https://www.instagram.com/arielkarate1/?hl=en

Sport
- Country: United States
- Sport: Karate
- Rank: San Dan Okinawa Goju Ryu Ni Dan Jyoshinmon Shorin Ryu
- Event: Individual kata
- Team: Team USA
- Coached by: Jesus Del Moral

Achievements and titles
- National finals: Multiple Times National Champion
- Highest world ranking: 2 WKF World Ranking Top 10 Olympic Ranking
Medal record
Men's karate
Representing United States
Olympic Games
Bronze medal – third place	2020 Tokyo	Individual kata
World Games
Silver medal – second place	2025 Chengdu	Individual kata
World Championships
Bronze medal – third place	2023 Budapest	Individual kata
Bronze medal – third place	2025 Cairo	Individual kata
Pan American Games
Gold medal – first place	2023 Santiago	Individual kata
Silver medal – second place	2019 Lima	Individual kata
Pan American Karate Championships
Gold medal – first place	2024 Uruguay	Individual kata
Gold medal – first place	2023 Costa Rica	Individual kata
Gold medal – first place	2022 Curaçao	Individual kata
Gold medal – first place	2021 Uruguay	Individual kata
Gold medal – first place	2019 Panama	Individual kata
Bronze medal – third place	2018 Chile	Individual kata
Karate1 - Premier League Championships
Bronze medal – third place	2021 Istanbul	Individual kata
Bronze medal – third place	2021 Cairo	Individual kata
Bronze medal – third place	2022 Fujairah	Individual kata
Bronze medal – third place	2022 Baku	Individual kata
Bronze medal – third place	2024 Paris	Individual kata
Silver medal – second place	2024 Antalya	Individual kata
Bronze medal – third place	2024 Cairo	Individual kata
Olympic Qualification Tournament
Gold medal – first place	2021 France	Individual kata

Ariel Torres Gutierrez (born November 6, 1997) is an American karateka. He won one of the bronze medals in the men's kata event at the 2020 Summer Olympics in Tokyo, Japan. At the 2019 Pan American Games held in Lima, Peru, he won the silver medal in the men's kata event. He won gold at the 2023 Pan American Games held in Santiago, Chile.

He qualified at the World Olympic Qualification Tournament in Paris, France to represent the United States at the 2020 Summer Olympics in Tokyo, Japan.

He won one of the bronze medals in the men's individual kata event at the 2023 World Karate Championships held in Budapest, Hungary. He won the silver medal in the men's kata event at the 2025 World Games held in Chengdu, China.
