= Karate at the 2023 European Games – Men's individual kata =

Men's individual kata at the 2023 European Games
- Venue: Bielsko-Biała Arena
- Date: 22 June
- Competitors: 8 from 8 nations

Medalists
gold medal	Damián Quintero	Spain
silver medal	Ali Sofuoğlu	Turkey
bronze medal	Yuki Ujihara	Switzerland
bronze medal	Mattia Busato	Italy

The men's individual kata competition at the 2023 European Games was held on 22 June 2023 at the Bielsko-Biała Arena.

== Results ==
=== Elimination round ===
Pool A

Pos	Athlete	B	W	L	PF	PA	(Turkey)	(Italy)	(Hungary)	(Poland)
1	Ali Sofuoğlu (TUR)	3	3	0	126.7	120.9	—	41.4	42.7	42.6
2	Mattia Busato (ITA)	3	2	1	124.4	119.0	41.3	—	41.4	41.7
3	Botond Nagy (HUN)	3	1	2	121.5	123.0	41.0	39.5	—	41.0
4	Maksymilian Szczypkowski (POL)	3	0	3	115.6	125.3	38.6	38.1	38.9	—

Source: EG2023

Pool B

Pos	Athlete	B	W	L	PF	PA	(Spain)	(Switzerland)	(France)	(Montenegro)
1	Damián Quintero (ESP)	3	3	0	127.7	118.2	—	42.7	42.3	42.7
2	Yuki Ujihara (SUI)	3	2	1	123.5	121.4	40.7	—	41.5	41.3
3	Franck Ngoan (FRA)	3	1	2	118.8	123.4	38.8	39.8	—	40.2
4	Vladimir Mijač (MNE)	3	0	3	117.2	124.2	38.7	38.9	39.6	—

Source: EG2023

=== Finals ===
Semifinals
Yuki Ujihara (SUI)	42.3
Ali Sofuoğlu (TUR)	44.6
Mattia Busato (ITA)	42.9
Damián Quintero (ESP)	44.7

Final
Ali Sofuoğlu (TUR)	44.1
Damián Quintero (ESP)	44.6
