= Karate at the 2022 World Games – Men's kata =

Men's kata at the 2022 World Games
- Venue: Bill Battle Coliseum
- Location: Birmingham, United States
- Dates: 8 July
- Competitors: 8 from 8 nations

Medalists
gold medal	Kazumasa Moto	Japan
silver medal	Damián Quintero	Spain
bronze medal	Gakuji Tozaki	United States

The men's kata competition in karate at the 2022 World Games took place on 8 July 2022 at the Bill Battle Coliseum in Birmingham, United States.

== Results ==
=== Elimination round ===
==== Pool A ====
Pos	Athlete	B	W	L	PF	PA	(Japan)	(United States)	(Azerbaijan)	(Panama)
1	Kazumasa Moto (JPN)	3	3	0	78.54	72.60	—	26.46	26.34	25.74
2	Gakuji Tozaki (USA)	3	2	1	76.80	73.92	25.94	—	25.40	25.46
3	Roman Heydarov (AZE)	3	1	2	70.92	76.28	22.68	23.46	—	24.78
4	Héctor Cención (PAN)	3	0	3	72.52	75.98	23.98	24.00	24.54	—

Source: Birmingham 2022

==== Pool B ====
Pos	Athlete	B	W	L	PF	PA	(Spain)	(Italy)	(Venezuela)	(Switzerland)
1	Damián Quintero (ESP)	3	3	0	77.42	74.26	—	26.08	25.54	25.80
2	Mattia Busato (ITA)	3	2	1	75.48	74.76	25.12	—	25.38	24.98
3	Antonio Díaz (VEN)	3	1	2	73.78	75.52	24.48	24.48	—	24.82
4	Yuki Ujihara (SUI)	3	0	3	73.46	75.60	24.66	24.20	24.60	—

Source: Birmingham 2022

=== Finals ===
Semi-finals
Mattia Busato (ITA)	25.52
Kazumasa Moto (JPN)	27.12
Gakuji Tozaki (USA)	25.86
Damián Quintero (ESP)	26.26

Gold medal bout
Kazumasa Moto (JPN)	26.60
Damián Quintero (ESP)	26.26
Bronze medal bout
Mattia Busato (ITA)	25.92
Gakuji Tozaki (USA)	26.20
