= Karate at the 2020 Summer Olympics – Men's kata =

Karate competition

Men's kata at the Games of the XXXII Olympiad
- Venue: Nippon Budokan
- Date: 6 August 2021
- Competitors: 11 from 11 nations (including 1 EOR athlete)

Medalists
1st place, gold medalist(s)		Ryo Kiyuna	Japan
2nd place, silver medalist(s)		Damián Quintero	Spain
3rd place, bronze medalist(s)		Ariel Torres	United States
3rd place, bronze medalist(s)		Ali Sofuoğlu	Turkey

The men's kata competition in Karate at the 2020 Summer Olympics was held on 6 August 2021 at the Nippon Budokan.

== Competition format ==
Competitors were divided into two pools of 5 or 6, and each took turns to perform two sets of kata in the elimination round. The top-three competitors by average score in each pool advanced to the ranking round, where they performed a third set of kata. The winner of pool A faced the winner of pool B in the gold medal bout. Two bronze medals were awarded in kata events. The runner-up of pool A faced the third-place finisher of pool B in a bronze medal bout, while the runner-up of pool B will face the third-place finisher of pool A in another bronze medal bout.

== Schedule ==
All times are in local time (UTC+9).

Date	Time	Round
Friday, 6 August 2021	10:00; 11:33; 19:30; 19:50; 20:00	Elimination round Ranking round Bronze medal bouts Gold medal bout Victory ceremony

== Results ==
=== Elimination and ranking rounds ===
Pool A

Athlete	1st kata	2nd kata	Avg.	Rank	3rd kata	Rank	Qualification
Damián Quintero (ESP)	27.34	27.40	27.37	1 Q	27.28	1 Q	Gold medal bout
Ariel Torres (USA)	26.40	25.98	26.19	2 Q	26.46	2 q	Bronze medal bout
Park Hee-jun (KOR)	25.72	25.52	25.62	3 Q	25.98	3 q	Bronze medal bout
Ilja Smorguner (GER)	25.02	24.10	24.56	4	Did not advance		
Mohammad Al-Mosawi (KUW)	24.32	24.24	24.28	5	Did not advance		

Pool B

Athlete	1st kata	2nd kata	Avg.	Rank	3rd kata	Rank	Qualification
Ryo Kiyuna (JPN)	28.26	28.40	28.33	1 Q	28.72	1 Q	Gold medal bout
Ali Sofuoğlu (TUR)	27.00	27.28	27.14	2 Q	27.32	2 q	Bronze medal bout
Antonio Díaz (VEN)	25.74	26.40	26.07	3 Q	26.28	3 q	Bronze medal bout
Mattia Busato (ITA)	25.08	25.92	25.50	4	Did not advance		
Wang Yi-ta (TPE)	25.00	24.94	24.97	5	Did not advance		
Wael Shueb (EOR)	23.20	23.40	23.30	6	Did not advance		

=== Bronze medal bouts ===
6 August; 19:30	Ariel Torres (USA)	26.72–26.34	Antonio Díaz (VEN)

6 August; 19:40	Park Hee-jun (KOR)	26.14–27.26	Ali Sofuoğlu (TUR)

=== Gold medal bout ===
6 August; 19:50	Damián Quintero (ESP)	27.66–28.72	Ryo Kiyuna (JPN)
