= Kakeru Nishiyama =

Japanese karateka (born 1995)

Personal information
- Born: 20 August 1995 (age 31)

Sport
- Country: Japan
- Sport: Karate
- Event: Individual kata
Medal record
Men's karate
Representing Japan
World Games
Gold medal – first place	2025 Chengdu	Individual kata
World Championships
Gold medal – first place	2025 Cairo	Individual kata
Bronze medal – third place	2023 Budapest	Individual kata
Asian Games
Gold medal – first place	2026 Aichi–Nagoya	Individual kata

Kakeru Nishiyama (born 20 August 1995) is a Japanese karateka. He won the gold medal in the men's kata event at the 2025 World Games held in Chengdu, China. He also won one of the bronze medals in the men's individual kata event at the 2023 World Karate Championships held in Budapest, Hungary.

== Achievements ==
Year	Competition	Venue	Rank	Event
2023	World Championships	Budapest, Hungary	3rd	Individual kata
2025	World Games	Chengdu, China	1st	Individual kata
2025	World Championships	Cairo, Egypt	1st	Individual kata
2026	Asian Games	Aichi and Nagoya, Japan	1st	Individual kata
