= Karate at the 2015 European Games – Men's individual kata =

Karate competition

Men's individual kata at the 2015 European Games
- Venue: Baku Crystal Hall
- Date: 14 June
- Competitors: 8 from 8 nations

Medalists
gold medal	Damián Quintero	Spain
silver medal	Mattia Busato	Italy
bronze medal	Mehmet Yakan	Turkey

The men's individual kata competition at the 2015 European Games in Baku, Azerbaijan was held on 14 June 2015 at the Crystal Hall.

== Schedule ==
All times are Azerbaijan Summer Time (UTC+5).

Date	Time	Event
Sunday, 14 June 2015	10:00	Elimination Round
Sunday, 14 June 2015	15:30	Semifinals
Sunday, 14 June 2015	18:00	Finals

== Results ==
Legend

- KK — Forfeit (Kiken)

=== Elimination round ===
==== Group A ====
Athlete	Pld	W	D	L	Points		
Athlete	Pld	W	D	L	GF	GA	Diff
Damián Quintero (ESP)	3	3	0	0	14	1	+13
Mattia Busato (ITA)	3	2	0	1	11	4	+7
Christopher Rohde (DEN)	3	1	0	2	5	10	-5
Pasi Hirvonen (FIN)	3	0	0	3	0	15	-15

	Score	
Damián Quintero (ESP)	5–0	Christopher Rohde (DEN)
Mattia Busato (ITA)	5–0	Pasi Hirvonen (FIN)
Damián Quintero (ESP)	5–0	Pasi Hirvonen (FIN)
Pasi Hirvonen (FIN)	5–0	Christopher Rohde (DEN)
Mattia Busato (ITA)	5–0	Christopher Rohde (DEN)
Damián Quintero (ESP)	4–1	Mattia Busato (ITA)

==== Group B ====
Athlete	Pld	W	D	L	Points		
Athlete	Pld	W	D	L	GF	GA	Diff
Mehmet Yakan (TUR)	3	3	0	0	14	1	+13
Vu Duc Minh Dack (FRA)	3	2	0	1	11	4	+7
Tural Baljanli (AZE)	3	1	0	2	5	10	-5
Adrian Guţă (ROU)	3	0	0	3	0	15	-15

	Score	
Mehmet Yakan (TUR)	5–0	Tural Baljanli (AZE)
Vu Duc Minh Dack (FRA)	5–0	Adrian Guţă (ROU)
Mehmet Yakan (TUR)	5–0	Adrian Guţă (ROU)
Vu Duc Minh Dack (FRA)	5–0	Tural Baljanli (AZE)
Tural Baljanli (AZE)	5–0	Adrian Guţă (ROU)
Mehmet Yakan (TUR)	4–1	Vu Duc Minh Dack (FRA)

=== Finals ===
Semifinals
Damián Quintero (ESP)	5
Vu Duc Minh Dack (FRA)	0
Mattia Busato (ITA)	3
Mehmet Yakan (TUR)	2

Gold medal match
Damián Quintero (ESP)	5
Mattia Busato (ITA)	0
Bronze medal match
Vu Duc Minh Dack (FRA)	1
Mehmet Yakan (TUR)	4
