= Damián Quintero =

Spanish karateka (born 1984)

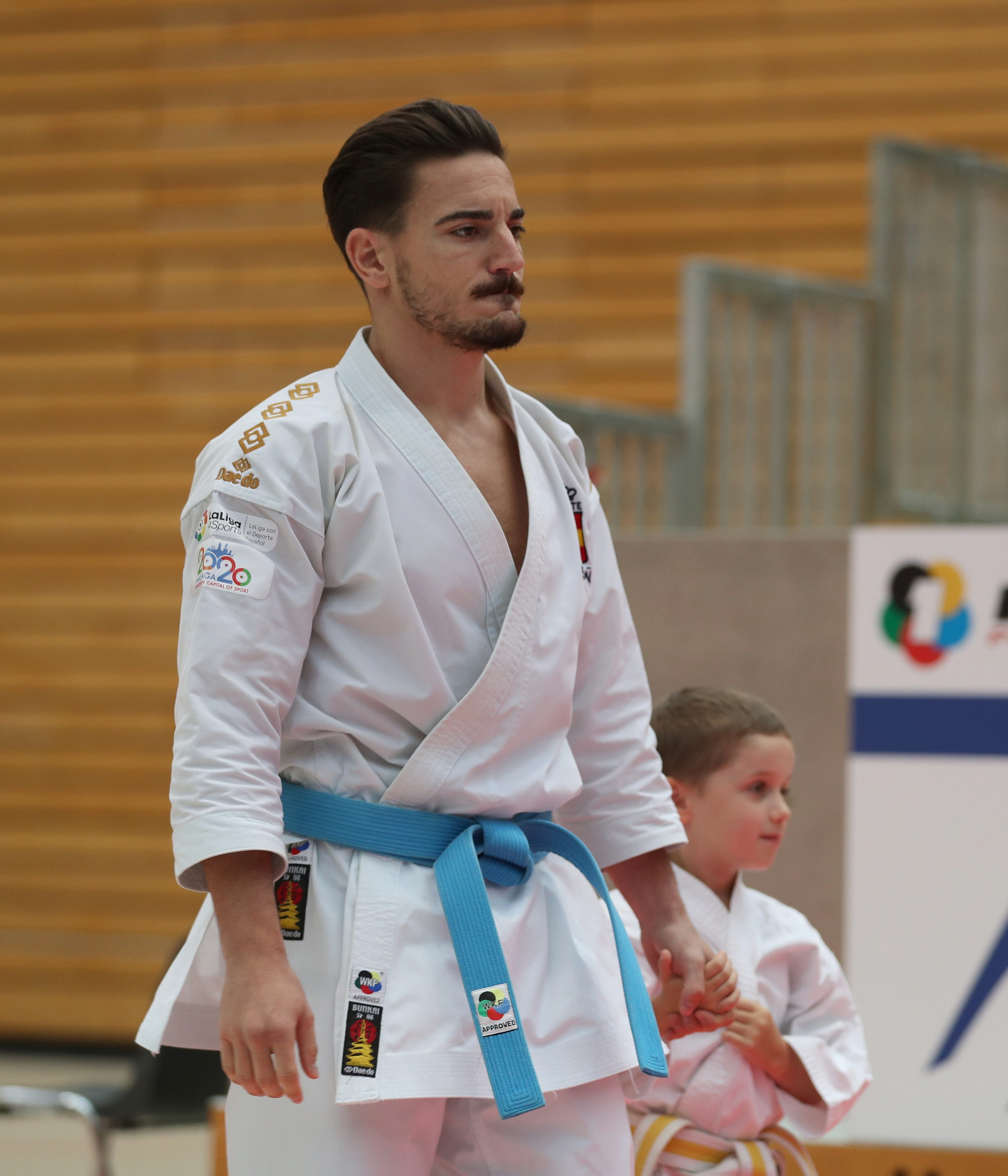
- Quintero in 2018

Personal information
- Full name: Damián Hugo Quintero Capdevila
- Born: 4 July 1984 (age 42) Buenos Aires, Argentina

Sport
- Country: Spain
- Sport: Karate
- Events: Individual kata; Team kata
Medal record
Men's karate
Representing Spain
Olympic Games
Silver medal – second place	2020 Tokyo	Individual kata
World Championships
Gold medal – first place	2014 Bremen	Team kata
Silver medal – second place	2016 Linz	Individual kata
Silver medal – second place	2018 Madrid	Individual kata
Silver medal – second place	2021 Dubai	Individual kata
Silver medal – second place	2023 Budapest	Individual kata
Bronze medal – third place	2010 Belgrade	Team kata
Bronze medal – third place	2016 Linz	Team kata
World Games
Silver medal – second place	2017 Wrocław	Individual kata
Silver medal – second place	2022 Birmingham	Individual kata
World Beach Games
Gold medal – first place	2019 Doha	Individual kata
European Games
Gold medal – first place	2015 Baku	Individual kata
Gold medal – first place	2019 Minsk	Individual kata
Gold medal – first place	2023 Kraków-Małopolska	Individual kata
European Championships
Gold medal – first place	2005 San Cristóbal de La Laguna	Team kata
Gold medal – first place	2013 Budapest	Individual kata
Gold medal – first place	2013 Budapest	Team kata
Gold medal – first place	2014 Tampere	Team kata
Gold medal – first place	2015 Istanbul	Individual kata
Gold medal – first place	2015 Istanbul	Team kata
Gold medal – first place	2016 Montpellier	Individual kata
Gold medal – first place	2017 İzmit	Individual kata
Gold medal – first place	2018 Novi Sad	Individual kata
Gold medal – first place	2019 Guadalajara	Individual kata
Gold medal – first place	2023 Guadalajara	Individual kata
Silver medal – second place	2004 Moscow	Individual kata
Silver medal – second place	2009 Zagreb	Team kata
Silver medal – second place	2010 Athens	Team kata
Silver medal – second place	2011 Zürich	Individual kata
Silver medal – second place	2011 Zürich	Team kata
Silver medal – second place	2012 Adeje	Team kata
Silver medal – second place	2014 Tampere	Individual kata
Silver medal – second place	2016 Montpellier	Team kata
Silver medal – second place	2021 Poreč	Individual kata
Silver medal – second place	2022 Gaziantep	Individual kata
Silver medal – second place	2024 Zadar	Individual kata
Silver medal – second place	2024 Zadar	Team kata
Bronze medal – third place	2006 Stavanger	Team kata
Bronze medal – third place	2007 Bratislava	Team kata
Bronze medal – third place	2008 Tallinn	Team kata

Damián Hugo Quintero Capdevila (born 4 July 1984) is a Spanish karateka. He won the silver medal in the men's kata event at the 2020 Summer Olympics in Tokyo, Japan. He is also a four-time silver medalist in the individual kata event at the World Championships, a seven-time gold medalist in his event at the European Championships and a three-time gold medalist in this event at the European Games.

== Early life ==
Born in Buenos Aires, he emigrated with his family to Torremolinos, Malaga, Spain a few years later. He began his karate training in 1991, at a Goju Ryu school run by Lorenzo Marin. In 1997, he won the Spanish national championship children's category.

== Career ==
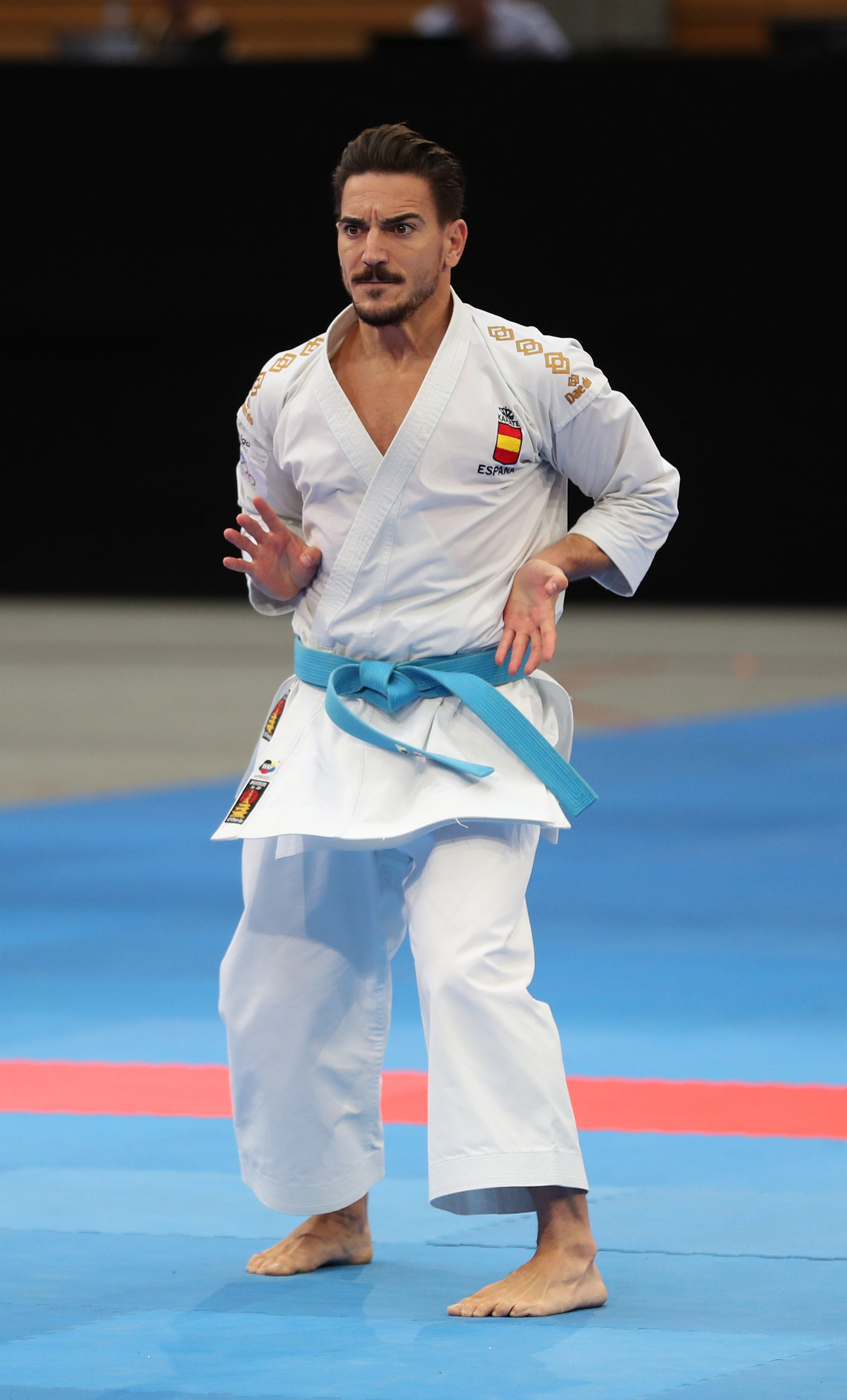
Quintero at K1PL 2018 in Berlin

In 2017, Quintero won the silver medal in the individual kata event at the World Games held in Wrocław, Poland.

In 2019, Quintero won the gold medal in the men's individual kata event at the European Games held in Minsk, Belarus. In the same year, he won the gold medal in the men's kata event at the European Karate Championships held in Guadalajara, Spain. In the same year, he also won the gold medal in the men's individual kata event at the World Beach Games held in Doha, Qatar.

Quintero represented Spain at the 2020 Summer Olympics in Tokyo, Japan. He won the silver medal in the men's kata event. A few months after the Olympics, he won the silver medal in the men's kata event at the 2021 World Karate Championships held in Dubai, United Arab Emirates.

Quintero won the silver medal in the men's kata event at the 2022 World Games held in Birmingham, United States.

Quintero won the gold medal in the men's individual kata event at the 2023 European Karate Championships held in Guadalajara, Spain. He also won the gold medal in the men's individual kata event at the 2023 European Games held in Poland. He won the silver medal in the men's individual kata event at the 2023 World Karate Championships held in Budapest, Hungary.

== Achievements ==
Year	Competition	Venue	Rank	Event
2004	European Championships	Moscow, Russia	2nd	Individual kata
2005	European Championships	San Cristóbal de La Laguna, Spain	1st	Team kata
2006	European Championships	Stavanger, Norway	3rd	Team kata
2007	European Championships	Bratislava, Slovakia	3rd	Team kata
2008	European Championships	Tallinn, Estonia	3rd	Team kata
2009	European Championships	Zagreb, Croatia	2nd	Team kata
2010	European Championships	Athens, Greece	2nd	Team kata
2010	World Championships	Belgrade, Serbia	3rd	Team kata
2011	European Championships	Zürich, Switzerland	2nd	Individual kata
2011	European Championships	Zürich, Switzerland	2nd	Team kata
2012	European Championships	Adeje, Spain	2nd	Team kata
2013	European Championships	Budapest, Hungary	1st	Individual kata
2013	European Championships	Budapest, Hungary	1st	Team kata
2014	European Championships	Tampere, Finland	2nd	Individual kata
2014	European Championships	Tampere, Finland	1st	Team kata
2014	World Championships	Bremen, Germany	1st	Team kata
2015	European Championships	Istanbul, Turkey	1st	Individual kata
2015	European Championships	Istanbul, Turkey	1st	Team kata
2015	European Games	Baku, Azerbaijan	1st	Individual kata
2016	European Championships	Montpellier, France	1st	Individual kata
2016	European Championships	Montpellier, France	2nd	Team kata
2016	World Championships	Linz, Austria	2nd	Individual kata
2016	World Championships	Linz, Austria	3rd	Team kata
2017	European Championships	İzmit, Turkey	1st	Individual kata
2017	World Games	Wrocław, Poland	2nd	Individual kata
2018	European Championships	Novi Sad, Serbia	1st	Individual kata
2018	World Championships	Madrid, Spain	2nd	Individual kata
2019	European Championships	Guadalajara, Spain	1st	Individual kata
2019	European Games	Minsk, Belarus	1st	Individual kata
2019	World Beach Games	Doha, Qatar	1st	Individual kata
2021	European Championships	Poreč, Croatia	2nd	Individual kata
2021	Summer Olympics	Tokyo, Japan	2nd	Individual kata
2021	World Championships	Dubai, United Arab Emirates	2nd	Individual kata
2022	European Championships	Gaziantep, Turkey	2nd	Individual kata
2022	World Games	Birmingham, United States	2nd	Individual kata
2023	European Championships	Guadalajara, Spain	1st	Individual kata
2023	European Games	Kraków and Małopolska, Poland	1st	Individual kata
2023	World Championships	Budapest, Hungary	2nd	Individual kata
2024	European Championships	Zadar, Croatia	2nd	Individual kata
2024	European Championships	Zadar, Croatia	2nd	Team kata
