= Kutluhan Duran =

Turkish karateka (born 2000)

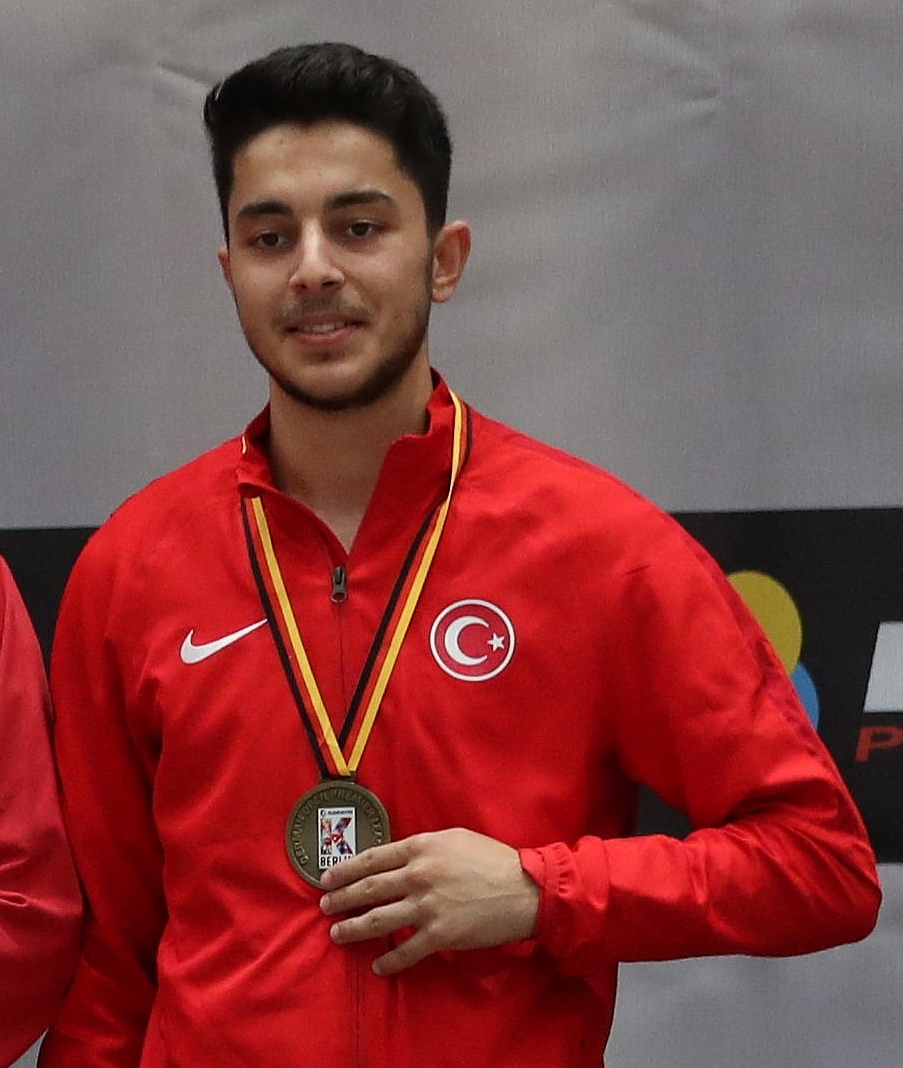
- Kutluhan Duran (2018)
- Born: 27 June 2000 (age 26); Antalya, Turkey
- Nationality: Turkish

Kutluhan Duran (born 27 June 2000) is a Turkish karateka competing in the kata discipline of karate.

== Career ==
Duran started his sports career at the age of eight, taking his first medal already at the 2008 Turkish championship. He then continued winning various medals in the age categories of domestic competitions. He debuted internationally at the 2017 European Karate Junior Championship held in Sofia, Bulgaria, and won the gold medal in the kata team cadet and junior category. At the 2018 Karate 1 Premier League tournament held in Berlin, Germany in 2018, he shared the bronze medal in the team kata event with his teammates Emre Vefa Göktaş and Ali Sofuoğlu. He took the silver medal at the 2019 Cadet, Junior and U21 Karate World Championship in Santiago, Chile. In 2019, he and his teammates Sofuoğlu and Göktaş became champion in the team kata event at the Karate 1 - Series A tournament in Salzburg, Austria, and at the Karate 1 Premier League tournament in Moscow, Russia. He won the bronze medal in the individual kata event at the 2023 European Karate Championships in Guadalajara, Spain.
