= Sophia Bouderbane =

French karateka (born 1995)

Personal information
- Born: 2 August 1995 (age 30) Toulon, France
- Height: 1.60 m (5 ft 3 in) (2021)
- Weight: 49 kg (108 lb) (2021)

Sport
- Country: France
- Sport: Karate
- Weight class: 50 kg
- League: Ligue Régionale Ile-de-France
- Club: Amicale Sportive Evry
- Coached by: Adrien Gautier
Medal record
Women's karate
Representing France
European Games
| Bronze medal – third place | 2019 Minsk | Kumite 50 kg |
European Championships
| Gold medal – first place | 2019 Guadalajara | Kumite 50 kg |
| Bronze medal – third place | 2014 Tampere | Kumite 50 kg |
| Bronze medal – third place | 2018 Novi Sad | Team kumite |

Sophia Bouderbane (born 2 August 1995) is a French karateka. She won the gold medal in the women's kumite 50 kg event at the 2019 European Karate Championships held in Guadalajara, Spain.

== Career ==
Bouderbane joined her neighbourhood karate club (in the village of Pignans) at the age of three, following her brother into the sport. At the age of nine she won her first national championship, and by the age of 14 she was training with the French national karate team. At club level, Bouderbane has represented Karaté Club Cabassois and Amicale Sportive d'Evry. She currently represents Amicale Sportive d'Evry, for whom she also acts as an ambassador.

In 2014, at the age of 18 – and while studying at INSA Lyon – she won a bronze medal in the women's kumite 50 kg event at the 2014 European Karate Championships held in Tampere, Finland. In 2016, Bouderbane underwent major surgery on her hip to correct a birth defect, but continued to train, compete, and continue her karate career. At the 2018 European Karate Championships held in Novi Sad, Serbia, she won the bronze medal in the team kumite event.

Bouderbane improved on this performance at the 2019 European Karate Championships in Guadalajara by winning the gold medal in the women's kumite 50 kg event, overcoming Austrian karateka (and former European Champion) Bettina Plank 5-0 in the final. Later in 2019, at the 2019 European Games held in Minsk, Belarus, she won a bronze medal in the women's kumite 50 kg event. In the semi-finals she lost against Serap Özçelik of Turkey.

Bouderbane has stated that she is unable to make a living from the sport in France, in part due to the lack of exposure at the Olympic Games. (Note: Subsequent to her statement in this interview, karate made its Summer Olympic Games debut at the 2020 Summer Olympics in Tokyo, Japan.) In this context, she has spoken of the importance of individual sponsorships. Bouderbane herself has been sponsored by FDJ and Michelin over the course of her sporting career.

== Achievements ==
| Year | Competition | Venue | Rank | Event |
|---|---|---|---|---|
| 2014 | European Championships | Tampere, Finland | 3rd | Kumite 50 kg |
| 2018 | European Championships | Novi Sad, Serbia | 3rd | Team kumite |
| 2019 | European Championships | Guadalajara, Spain | 1st | Kumite 50 kg |
| 2019 | European Games | Minsk, Belarus | 3rd | Kumite 50 kg |
