= Mattia Busato =

Italian karateka (born 1993)

Personal information
- Born: 2 February 1993 (age 33)

Sport
- Country: Italy
- Sport: Karate
- Events: Individual kata; Team kata
Medal record
Men's karate
Representing Italy
World Championships
Bronze medal – third place	2016 Linz	Team kata
Bronze medal – third place	2018 Madrid	Individual kata
Bronze medal – third place	2021 Dubai	Individual kata
Bronze medal – third place	2021 Dubai	Team kata
European Games
Silver medal – second place	2015 Baku	Individual kata
Bronze medal – third place	2019 Minsk	Individual kata
Bronze medal – third place	2023 Kraków-Małopolska	Individual kata
European Championships
Gold medal – first place	2014 Tampere	Individual kata
Gold medal – first place	2026 Frankfurt	Team kata
Silver medal – second place	2014 Tampere	Team kata
Silver medal – second place	2015 Istanbul	Team kata
Silver medal – second place	2017 İzmit	Team kata
Silver medal – second place	2023 Guadalajara	Individual kata
Silver medal – second place	2025 Yerevan	Team kata
Bronze medal – third place	2015 Istanbul	Individual kata
Bronze medal – third place	2016 Montpellier	Individual kata
Bronze medal – third place	2017 İzmit	Individual kata
Bronze medal – third place	2018 Novi Sad	Individual kata
Bronze medal – third place	2019 Guadalajara	Individual kata
Bronze medal – third place	2021 Poreč	Individual kata
Bronze medal – third place	2022 Gaziantep	Individual kata
Bronze medal – third place	2022 Gaziantep	Team kata
Bronze medal – third place	2023 Guadalajara	Team kata
Bronze medal – third place	2024 Zadar	Team kata

Mattia Busato (born 2 February 1993) is an Italian karateka. He is a four-time bronze medalist at the World Karate Championships. He is also the gold medalist in the men's individual kata event at the 2014 European Karate Championships held in Tampere, Finland.

Busato represented Italy at the 2020 Summer Olympics in Tokyo, Japan. He competed in the men's kata event.

== Career ==
In 2015, Busato won the silver medal in the men's individual kata event at the European Games held in Baku, Azerbaijan. In 2019, he won one of the bronze medals in this event at the European Games in Minsk, Belarus.

He competed in the men's kata event at the 2017 World Games held in Wrocław, Poland. In 2018, Busato won one of the bronze medals in the men's kata event at the World University Karate Championships held in Kobe, Japan.

Busato represented Italy at the 2020 Summer Olympics in Tokyo, Japan in karate. He finished in 4th place in his pool in the elimination round of the men's kata event and he did not advance to the next round. In October 2021, he won the gold medal in his event at the 2021 Mediterranean Karate Championships held in Limassol, Cyprus. In November 2021, Busato won one of the bronze medals in both the men's kata and men's team kata events at the World Karate Championships held in Dubai, United Arab Emirates.

Busato lost his bronze medal match in the men's kata event at the 2022 World Games held in Birmingham, United States. He won the silver medal in the men's individual kata event at the 2023 European Karate Championships held in Guadalajara, Spain. He also won one of the bronze medals in the men's team kata event.

Busato won one of the bronze medals in the men's individual kata event at the 2023 European Games held in Poland. He lost his bronze medal match in the men's individual kata event at the 2023 World Karate Championships held in Budapest, Hungary.

== Achievements ==
Year	Competition	Venue	Rank	Event
2014	European Championships	Tampere, Finland	1st	Individual kata
2014	European Championships	Tampere, Finland	2nd	Team kata
2015	European Championships	Istanbul, Turkey	3rd	Individual kata
2015	European Championships	Istanbul, Turkey	2nd	Team kata
2015	European Games	Baku, Azerbaijan	2nd	Individual kata
2016	European Championships	Montpellier, France	3rd	Individual kata
2016	World Championships	Linz, Austria	3rd	Team kata
2017	European Championships	İzmit, Turkey	3rd	Individual kata
2017	European Championships	İzmit, Turkey	2nd	Team kata
2018	European Championships	Novi Sad, Serbia	3rd	Individual kata
2018	World Championships	Madrid, Spain	3rd	Individual kata
2019	European Championships	Guadalajara, Spain	3rd	Individual kata
2019	European Games	Minsk, Belarus	3rd	Individual kata
2021	European Championships	Poreč, Croatia	3rd	Individual kata
2021	World Championships	Dubai, United Arab Emirates	3rd	Individual kata
2021	World Championships	Dubai, United Arab Emirates	3rd	Team kata
2022	European Championships	Gaziantep, Turkey	3rd	Individual kata
2022	European Championships	Gaziantep, Turkey	3rd	Team kata
2023	European Championships	Guadalajara, Spain	2nd	Individual kata
2023	European Championships	Guadalajara, Spain	3rd	Team kata
2023	European Games	Kraków and Małopolska, Poland	3rd	Individual kata
2024	European Championships	Zadar, Croatia	3rd	Team kata
2025	European Championships	Yerevan, Armenia	2nd	Team kata
2026	European Championships	Frankfurt, Germany	1st	Team kata
