= Ilja Smorguner =

German karateka (born 1984)

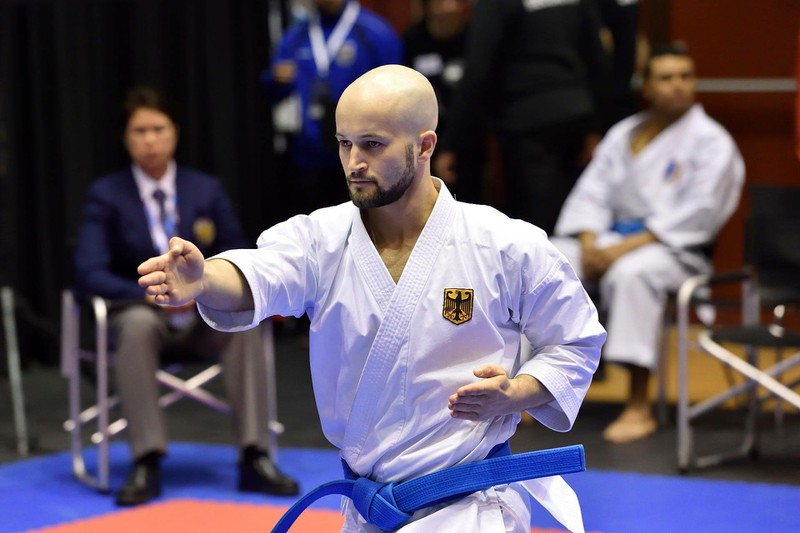
- Ilja Smorguner in 2014

Personal information
- Born: 24 June 1984 (age 42)

Sport
- Country: Germany
- Sport: Karate
- Event: Individual kata
Medal record
Men's karate
Representing Germany
World Championships
Silver medal – second place	2014 Bremen	Individual kata
Bronze medal – third place	2016 Linz	Individual kata

Ilja Smorguner (born 24 June 1984) is a German karateka. He is a two-time medalist in the men's individual kata event at the World Karate Championships.

Smorguner represented Germany at the 2020 Summer Olympics in Tokyo, Japan. He competed in the men's kata event.

== Career ==
In 2017, Smorguner competed in the men's kata event at the World Games held in Wrocław, Poland. He lost his matches in the elimination round and he did not advance to compete in the semi-finals. In 2018, he lost his bronze medal match in the men's individual kata event at the World Karate Championships held in Madrid, Spain. In 2019, he lost his bronze medal match in the men's individual kata event at the 2019 European Games held in Minsk, Belarus. In that year, he also competed in the men's individual kata event at the 2019 World Beach Games held in Doha, Qatar.

In 2021, Smorguner competed at the World Olympic Qualification Tournament held in Paris, France hoping to qualify for the 2020 Summer Olympics in Tokyo, Japan. He did not qualify at this tournament but he qualified after reassignment of the last qualifying spots. He finished in 4th place in his pool in the elimination round of the men's kata event and he did not advance to the next round. In November 2021, he competed at the 2021 World Karate Championships held in Dubai, United Arab Emirates.

== Achievements ==
Year	Competition	Venue	Rank	Event
2014	World Championships	Bremen, Germany	2nd	Individual kata
2016	World Championships	Linz, Austria	3rd	Individual kata
