= Roman Heydarov =

Azerbaijani karateka (born 1999)

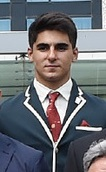

Personal information
- Born: 24 January 1999 (age 27)

Sport
- Country: Azerbaijan
- Sport: Karate
- Events: Individual kata; Team kata
Medal record
Men's karate
Representing Azerbaijan
European Games
Bronze medal – third place	2019 Minsk	Individual kata
Islamic Solidarity Games
Gold medal – first place	2017 Baku	Individual kata
Bronze medal – third place	2021 Konya	Individual kata
Bronze medal – third place	2025 Riyadh	Individual kata
European Championships
Bronze medal – third place	2016 Montpellier	Individual kata
Bronze medal – third place	2017 İzmit	Individual kata
Bronze medal – third place	2018 Novi Sad	Individual kata
Bronze medal – third place	2019 Guadalajara	Individual kata
Bronze medal – third place	2024 Zadar	Team kata

Roman Heydarov (born 24 January 1999) is an Azerbaijani karateka. He won one of the bronze medals in the men's individual kata event at the 2019 European Games held in Minsk, Belarus.

== Career ==
In 2018, Heydarov competed in the men's individual kata event at the World Karate Championships held in Madrid, Spain.

In June 2021, Heydarov competed at the World Olympic Qualification Tournament held in Paris, France hoping to qualify for the 2020 Summer Olympics in Tokyo, Japan. In November 2021, he competed at the 2021 World Karate Championships held in Dubai, United Arab Emirates.

Heydarov competed in the men's kata at the 2022 World Games held in Birmingham, United States. He won one of the bronze medals in the men's individual kata event at the 2021 Islamic Solidarity Games held in Konya, Turkey.

== Achievements ==
Year	Competition	Venue	Rank	Event
2016	European Championships	Montpellier, France	3rd	Individual kata
2017	European Championships	İzmit, Turkey	3rd	Individual kata
2017	Islamic Solidarity Games	Baku, Azerbaijan	1st	Individual kata
2018	European Championships	Novi Sad, Serbia	3rd	Individual kata
2019	European Championships	Guadalajara, Spain	3rd	Individual kata
2019	European Games	Minsk, Belarus	3rd	Individual kata
2022	Islamic Solidarity Games	Konya, Turkey	3rd	Individual kata
2024	European Championships	Zadar, Croatia	3rd	Team kata
