= Emre Vefa Göktaş =

Turkish karateka (born 1998)

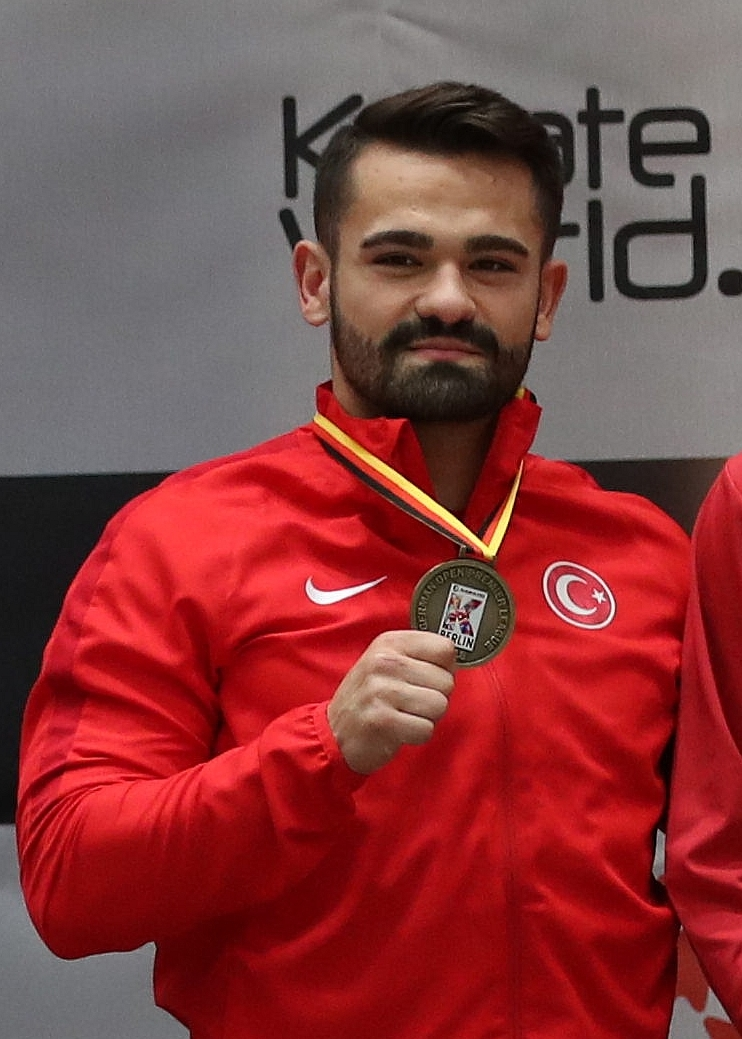
- Emre Vefa Göktaş (2018)
- Born: 24 June 1998 (age 28); Ankara Turkey
- Nationality: Turkish
- Style: Shotokan - Genseiryū
- Team: Kağıthane Belediyesi SK

Other information
- University: Gazi University

Emre Vefa Göktaş (born 24 June 1998) is a Turkish karateka competing in the kata discipline of karate. He is a member of Kağıthane Belediyesi SK. He studies at the Physical Education and Sports Academy of Gazi University.

== Career ==
He won the bronze medal in the team kata event at the 2018 European Karate Championships held in Novi Sad, Serbia, the silver medal in the same event at the 2019 European Championships in Guadalajara, Spain, and the gold medal again in the same event at the 2021 European Championships in Poreč, Croatia.

He won the bronze medal in the Team kata event at the 2021 World Karate Championships held in Dubai, United Arab Emirates.
