= Ali Sofuoğlu =

Turkish karateka (born 1995)

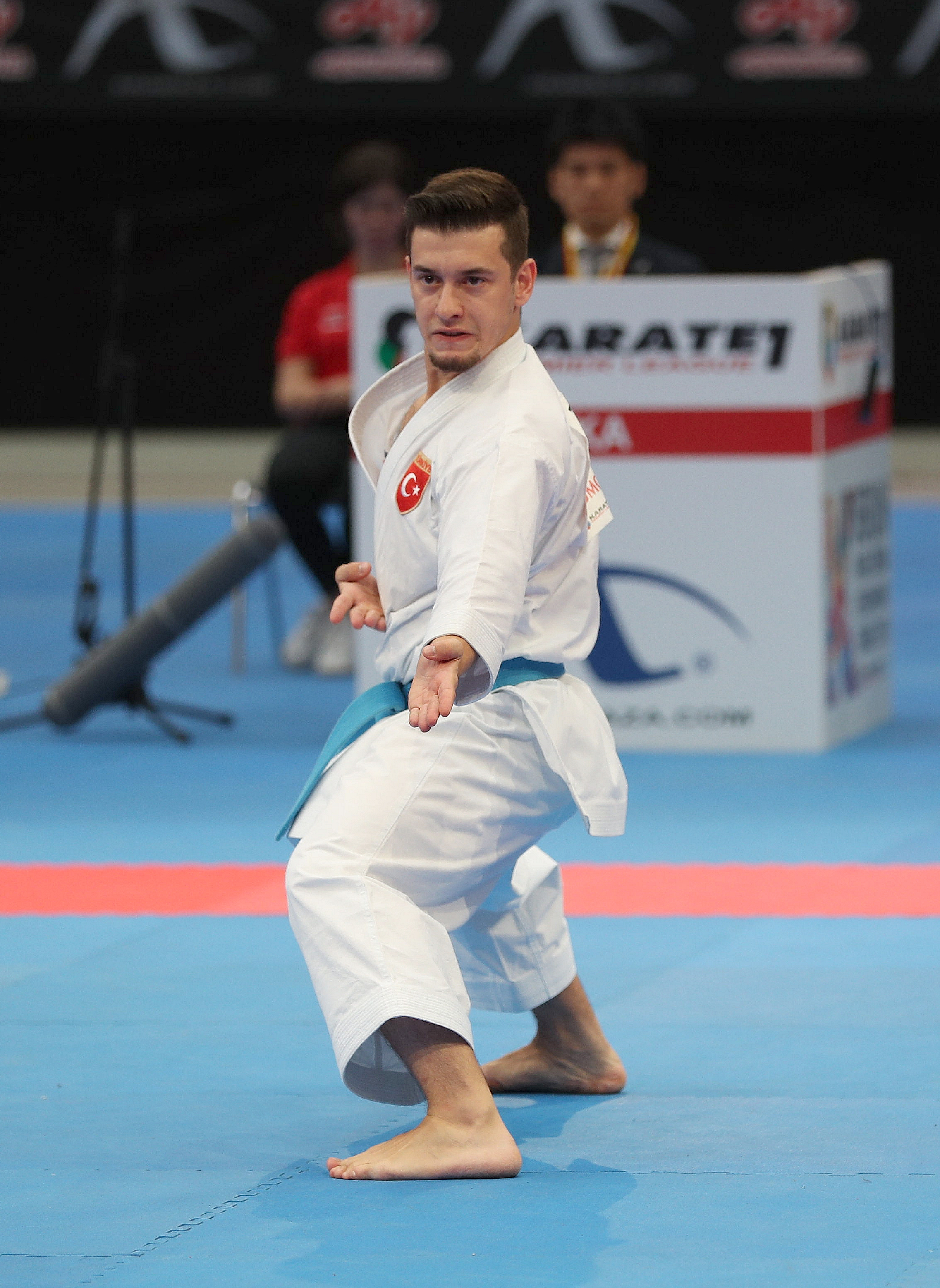
- Sofuoğlu in 2018
- Born: 3 June 1995 (age 31); Istanbul, Turkey
- Nationality: Turkish
- Style: Karate Kata
- Team: Kağıthane Belediyesi S.K.

Ali Sofuoğlu (born 3 June 1995) is a Turkish karateka competing in the kata. He is a member of Kağıthane Belediyesi S.K. In 2021, he won one of the bronze medals in the men's kata event at the 2020 Summer Olympics in Tokyo, Japan. He won the gold medal in the men's individual kata event at the 2023 World Karate Championships held in Budapest, Hungary.

== Career ==
Ali Sofuoğlu was already European champion at the cadet level in 2010 and 2011. In the juniors he was runner-up three times in a row from 2011 to 2013. At the U21 level, he finally managed to win the World Championship in 2015 and also became European champion two more times in 2014 and 2016. In the adult field, he was already part of the Turkish team that won the bronze medal at the European Championships in Adeje in 2012. His next podium finish came at the 2017 European Championships in İzmit when he finished second in the singles behind Damián Quintero. He repeated this success both in 2018 in Novi Sad and in 2019 in Guadalajara, both times again behind Damián Quintero. In addition, he finished second with the team in 2018 and third in 2019. In 2018, Sofuoğlu also finished third at the World Championships in Madrid. A year later, he once again finished second behind Damián Quintero at the European Games in Minsk.

At the 2020 World Championships held in Dubai in 2021, Sofuoğlu secured third place in the individual and team events, while in Poreč he became European champion in these two disciplines. In 2022, he successfully defended his title in the individual and team events in Gaziantep. Sofuoğlu qualified for the 2020 Tokyo Olympics, also held in 2021, through the Olympic Rankings. He finished the group stage in second place behind Ryō Kiyuna with 27.32 points, advancing to the bronze medal duel against Park Hee-jun. With 27.26 points, he surpassed Park's score of 26.14 points and secured the medal. Behind Olympic champion Ryō Kiyuna and second-place finisher Damián Quintero, Ariel Torres also won a bronze medal alongside Sofuoğlu.

In 2021, he won one of the bronze medals in the men's kata event at the 2020 Summer Olympics in Tokyo, Japan.

He won the silver medal in the men's individual kata event at the 2023 European Games held in Poland. He won the gold medalin the men's individual kata event at the 2023 World Karate Championships held in Budapest, Hungary.

In May 2025, he was found to have violated an anti-doping regulation under Article 2.4 of the WKF Anti-Doping Rules. He was given a two-year suspension from competition, and all of his competitive results from 11 October 2023 onwards were disqualified.

On 15 July 2025, the CAS confirmed that a violation had been committed and imposed a two-year period of ineligibility, while at the same time reinstating his results from 11 October 2023 onwards.

In 2025, he appeared as a member of Team Turkey on the Netflix reality competition series Physical: Asia, which premiered on 28 October 2025.

== Filmography ==
=== Web shows ===
Year	Title	Role	Notes	Ref.
2025	Physical: Asia	Contestant	Netflix	
