= 2017 Karate1 Premier League =

The '''Karate 1 – Premier League 2017''' is a series of international karate competitions organized by the World Karate Federation (WKF) during the year 2017. The series consists of multiple stages held across different countries within the Premier League circuit and brings together top-level karate athletes from around the world competing in both kata and kumite disciplines.

This series is considered one of the most important events in international karate, as it contributes to the global ranking of athletes.

== Events ==
Karate 1 – Premier League 2017
Stages	Date	Series	City	Country
1	27–29 January 2017	Premier League – Paris	Paris	France
2	17–19 March 2017	Premier League – Rotterdam	Rotterdam	Netherlands
3	31 March – 2 April 2017	Premier League – Dubai	Dubai	United Arab Emirates
4	14–16 April 2017	Premier League – Rabat	Rabat	Morocco
5	8–10 September 2017	Premier League – Halle/Leipzig	Halle/Leipzig	Germany

== Karate1 Premier League - Paris 2017 ==
The Karate 1 Premier League – Paris 2017 was held on 27–29 January 2017 in Paris, France.

=== Men ===
Event	Gold	Silver	Bronze
Individual kata	Ryo Kiyuna; Japan	Issei Shimbaba; Japan	Arata Kinjo; Japan
Individual kata	Ryo Kiyuna; Japan	Issei Shimbaba; Japan	Yuhei Horiba; Japan
Kumite -60 kg	Sadriddin Saymatov; Uzbekistan	Senthilkumar Selvarajoo; Malaysia	Aykut Kaya; Turkey
Kumite -60 kg	Sadriddin Saymatov; Uzbekistan	Senthilkumar Selvarajoo; Malaysia	Eray Samdan; Turkey
Kumite -67 kg	Andres Madera; Venezuela	Rinat Sagandykov; Kazakhstan	Fahad Alkhathami; Saudi Arabia
Kumite -67 kg	Andres Madera; Venezuela	Rinat Sagandykov; Kazakhstan	Ayoub Zakaria; Morocco
Kumite -75 kg	Stanislav Horuna; Ukraine	Ahmed El Sharaby; Egypt	Yuta Mori; Japan
Kumite -75 kg	Stanislav Horuna; Ukraine	Ahmed El Sharaby; Egypt	Julien Caffaro; France
Kumite -84 kg	Ryutaro Araga; Japan	Ilya Granovesov; Russia	Georgios Tzanos; Greece
Kumite -84 kg	Ryutaro Araga; Japan	Ilya Granovesov; Russia	Zabihollah Poorshab; Iran
Kumite 84+ kg	Sajad Ganjzadeh; Iran	Tyron Lardy; Netherlands	Simone Marino; Italy
Kumite 84+ kg	Sajad Ganjzadeh; Iran	Tyron Lardy; Netherlands	Saman Heydari; Iran
Team kata	Italy; Mattia Busato; Alfredo Tocco; Alessandro Iodice	Italy; Giuseppe Panagia; Gianluca Gallo; Samuel Stea	France; Loick Tranier; Sorey Morassi; Kewin Ngoan
Team kata	Italy; Mattia Busato; Alfredo Tocco; Alessandro Iodice	Italy; Giuseppe Panagia; Gianluca Gallo; Samuel Stea	France; Mohamed Al Qattan; Mohamed Al Mosawi; Salman Al Mosawi

=== Women ===
Event	Gold	Silver	Bronze
Individual kata	Hikaru Ono; Japan	Sandy Scordo; France	Sandra Sanchez; Spain
Individual kata	Hikaru Ono; Japan	Sandy Scordo; France	Alexandra Feracci; France
Kumite -50 kg	Miho Miyahara; Japan	Ayaka Tadano; Japan	Umay Tokcan; Turkey
Kumite -50 kg	Miho Miyahara; Japan	Ayaka Tadano; Japan	Serap Ozcelik; Turkey
Kumite -55 kg	Taravat Khaksar; Iran	Amy Connell; Scotland	Kathryn Campbell; Canada
Kumite -55 kg	Taravat Khaksar; Iran	Amy Connell; Scotland	Cristina Ferrer Garcia; Spain
Kumite -61 kg	Jovana Prekovic; Serbia	Merve Coban; Turkey	Haya Jumaa; Canada
Kumite -61 kg	Jovana Prekovic; Serbia	Merve Coban; Turkey	Mayumi Someya; Japan
Kumite -68 kg	Alizee Agier; France	Iryna Zaretska; Azerbaijan	Kayo Someya; Japan
Kumite -68 kg	Alizee Agier; France	Iryna Zaretska; Azerbaijan	Lamya Matoub; France
Kumite 68+ kg	Natsumi Kawamura; Japan	Nadege Ait Ibrahim; France	Anne Laure Florentin; France
Kumite 68+ kg	Natsumi Kawamura; Japan	Nadege Ait Ibrahim; France	Ayumi Uekusa; Japan
Team kata	Italy; Michela Pezzetti; Viviana Bottaro; Sara Battaglia	Germany; Jasmin Bleul; Christine Heinrich; Sophie Wachter	Italy; Francesca Reale; Lisa Pivi; Carola Casale
Team kata	Italy; Michela Pezzetti; Viviana Bottaro; Sara Battaglia	Germany; Jasmin Bleul; Christine Heinrich; Sophie Wachter	Spain; Paula Rodriguez Nieto; Gema Morales; Margarita Morata Martos

== Karate1 Premier League - Rotterdam 2017 ==
The Karate 1 Premier League – Rotterdam 2017 was held on 17–19 March 2017 in Rotterdam, Netherlands.

=== Men ===
Event	Gold	Silver	Bronze
Individual kata	Issei Shimbaba; Japan	Damian Quintero; Spain	Alessandro Iodice; Italy
Individual kata	Issei Shimbaba; Japan	Damian Quintero; Spain	Chikashi Hayashida; Japan
Kumite -60 kg	Sadriddin Saymatov; Uzbekistan	Kalvis Kalnins; Latvia	Abdessalam Ameknassi; Morocco
Kumite -60 kg	Sadriddin Saymatov; Uzbekistan	Kalvis Kalnins; Latvia	Michael Dasoul; Belgium
Kumite -67 kg	Steven Da Costa; France	Andres Madera; Venezuela	Davit Pataridze; Georgia
Kumite -67 kg	Steven Da Costa; France	Andres Madera; Venezuela	Gianluca De Vivo; Italy
Kumite -75 kg	Logan Costa; France	Thomas Scott; United States	Ebrahim Hassan Beigi; Iran
Kumite -75 kg	Logan Costa; France	Thomas Scott; United States	Corentin Seguy; France
Kumite -84 kg	Ryutaro Araga; Japan	Rene Smaal; Netherlands	Zabihollah Poorshab; Iran
Kumite -84 kg	Ryutaro Araga; Japan	Rene Smaal; Netherlands	Valerii Chobotar; Hungary
Kumite +84 kg	Jonathan Horne; Germany	Daniel Gaysinsky; Canada	Gogita Arkania; Georgia
Kumite +84 kg	Jonathan Horne; Germany	Daniel Gaysinsky; Canada	Sajad Ganjzadeh; Iran
Team kata	Morocco; Adnane Elhakimi; Mohammed El Hanni; Bilal Benkacem	Indonesia; Andi Tomy Aditya; Andi Dasril Dharmawan; Aspar Sesasria	France; Ahmed Zemouri; Lucas Jeannot; Enzo Montarello
Team kata	Morocco; Adnane Elhakimi; Mohammed El Hanni; Bilal Benkacem	Indonesia; Andi Tomy Aditya; Andi Dasril Dharmawan; Aspar Sesasria	Malaysia; Ivan Oh Theng Wei; Emmanuel Leong; Thomson Hoe

=== Women ===
Event	Gold	Silver	Bronze
Individual kata	Kiyou Shimizu; Japan	Hikaru Ono; Japan	Sandra Sanchez; Spain
Individual kata	Kiyou Shimizu; Japan	Hikaru Ono; Japan	Grace Lau; Hong Kong
Kumite -50 kg	Alexandra Recchia; France	Aicha Sayah; Morocco	Li Ranran; China
Kumite -50 kg	Alexandra Recchia; France	Aicha Sayah; Morocco	Gu Shiau-shuang; Chinese Taipei
Kumite -55 kg	Anzhelika Terliuga; Ukraine	Alessandra Hasani; Croatia	Cok Istri Agung Sanistyarani; Indonesia
Kumite -55 kg	Anzhelika Terliuga; Ukraine	Alessandra Hasani; Croatia	Sara Cardin; Italy
Kumite -61 kg	Yin Xiaoyan; China	Haya Jumaa; Canada	Anita Serogina; Ukraine
Kumite -61 kg	Yin Xiaoyan; China	Haya Jumaa; Canada	Jovana Prekovic; Serbia
Kumite -68 kg	Iryna Zaretska; France	Alisa Buchinger; Austria	Alizee Agier; France
Kumite -68 kg	Iryna Zaretska; France	Alisa Buchinger; Austria	Vasiliki Panetsidou; Greece
Kumite +68 kg	Ayumi Uekusa; Japan	Anastasiya Stepashko; Ukraine	Eleni Chatziliadou; Germany
Kumite +68 kg	Ayumi Uekusa; Japan	Anastasiya Stepashko; Ukraine	Nancy Garcia; France
Team kata	Italy; Michela Pezzetti; Viviana Bottaro; Sara Battaglia	France; Lila Bui; Marie Bui; Sandy Scordo	Italy; Francesca Reale; Carola Casale; Lisa Pivi
Team kata	Italy; Michela Pezzetti; Viviana Bottaro; Sara Battaglia	France; Lila Bui; Marie Bui; Sandy Scordo	Germany; Jasmin Bleul; Christine Heinrich; Sophie Wachter

== Karate1 Premier League - Dubai 2017 ==
The Karate 1 Premier League – Dubai 2017 was held on 31 March – 2 April 2017 in Dubai, United Arab Emirates.

=== Men ===
Event	Gold	Silver	Bronze
Individual kata	Damian Quintero; Spain	Ali Sofuoglu; Turkey	Abolfazl Shahrjerdi; Iran
Individual kata	Damian Quintero; Spain	Ali Sofuoglu; Turkey	Mattia Busato; Italy
Kumite -60 kg	Sadriddin Saymatov; Uzbekistan	Aykut Kaya; Turkey	Amir Mehdizadeh; Iran
Kumite -60 kg	Sadriddin Saymatov; Uzbekistan	Aykut Kaya; Turkey	Eray Samdan; Turkey
Kumite -67 kg	Saeid Alipour; Iran	Dionysios Xenos; Greece	Bader Alotaibi; Saudi Arabia
Kumite -67 kg	Saeid Alipour; Iran	Dionysios Xenos; Greece	Muhammet Ali Yilmaz; Turkey
Kumite -75 kg	Thomas Scott; United States	Luigi Busa; Italy	Stanislav Horuna; Ukraine
Kumite -75 kg	Thomas Scott; United States	Luigi Busa; Italy	Erman Eltemur; Turkey
Kumite -84 kg	Ivan Kvesic; Croatia	Ilya Granovesov; Russia	Anton Isakau; Belarus
Kumite -84 kg	Ivan Kvesic; Croatia	Ilya Granovesov; Russia	Georgios Tzanos; Greece
Kumite +84 kg	Sajad Ganjzadeh; Iran	Gogita Arkania; Georgia	Andjelo Kvesic; Croatia
Kumite +84 kg	Sajad Ganjzadeh; Iran	Gogita Arkania; Georgia	Alparslan Yamanoglu; Turkey
Team kata	Italy; Gianluca Gallo; Mattia Busato; Alessandro Iodice	Spain; Sergio Galan Lopez; Jose Manuel Carbonell; Francisco Jose Salazar	France; Mohamed Al Qattan; Mohamed Al Mosawi; Salman Al Mosawi
Team kata	Italy; Gianluca Gallo; Mattia Busato; Alessandro Iodice	Spain; Sergio Galan Lopez; Jose Manuel Carbonell; Francisco Jose Salazar	Iran; Amirbahador Tadayon; Roozbeh Roshani; Soheil Sajedifar

=== Women ===
Event	Gold	Silver	Bronze
Individual kata	Sandra Sanchez; Spain	Aprilia Krisda Putri; Indonesia	Negin Bagheri Bazardeh; Iran
Individual kata	Sandra Sanchez; Spain	Aprilia Krisda Putri; Indonesia	Terryana D'Onofrio; Italy
Kumite -50 kg	Bettina Plank; Austria	Serap Ozcelik; Turkey	Jelena Milivojcevic; Serbia
Kumite -50 kg	Bettina Plank; Austria	Serap Ozcelik; Turkey	Sevil Bas; Turkey
Kumite -55 kg	Fatemeh Chalak; Iran	Valeria Finashkina; Russia	Wen Tzu-yun; Chinese Taipei
Kumite -55 kg	Fatemeh Chalak; Iran	Valeria Finashkina; Russia	Sabina Laaveri; Sweden
Kumite -61 kg	Anita Serogina; Ukraine	Ingrida Suchankova; Slovakia	Yin Xiaoyan; China
Kumite -61 kg	Anita Serogina; Ukraine	Ingrida Suchankova; Slovakia	Nguyen Thi Ngoan; Vietnam
Kumite -68 kg	Iryna Zaretska; Azerbaijan	Elena Quirici; Switzerland	Vasiliki Panetsidou; Greece
Kumite -68 kg	Iryna Zaretska; Azerbaijan	Elena Quirici; Switzerland	Lisa Rasmusson; Sweden
Kumite +68 kg	Ayumi Uekusa; Japan	Aleksandra Stubleva; Bulgaria	Ramona Bruederlin; Switzerland
Kumite +68 kg	Ayumi Uekusa; Japan	Aleksandra Stubleva; Bulgaria	Maya Wasowicz; United States
Team kata	Italy; Michela Pezzetti; Viviana Bottaro; Sara Battaglia	Spain; Gema Morales; Paula Rodriguez; Margarita Morata	Turkey; Rabia Kusmus; Dilara Bozan; Gizem Sahin
Team kata	Italy; Michela Pezzetti; Viviana Bottaro; Sara Battaglia	Spain; Gema Morales; Paula Rodriguez; Margarita Morata	Croatia; Nika Jukic; Mihaela Petrovic; Vlatka Kiuk

== Karate1 Premier League - Rabat 2017 ==
The Karate 1 Premier League – Rabat 2017 was held on 14–16 April 2017 in Rabat, Morocco.

=== Men ===
Event	Gold	Silver	Bronze
Individual kata	Mohammed Elhanni; Morocco	Bilal Benkacem; Morocco	Adnane Elhakimi; Morocco
Individual kata	Mohammed Elhanni; Morocco	Bilal Benkacem; Morocco	Ali Sofuoglu; Turkey
Kumite -60 kg	Malek Salama; Egypt	Abdullah Alharbi; Saudi Arabia	Aykut Kaya; Turkey
Kumite -60 kg	Malek Salama; Egypt	Abdullah Alharbi; Saudi Arabia	Aymene Takzima; Morocco
Kumite -67 kg	Ali Elsawy; Egypt	Omer Kemaloglu; Turkey	Raul Cuerva Mora; Spain
Kumite -67 kg	Ali Elsawy; Egypt	Omer Kemaloglu; Turkey	Ayoube Zakaria; Morocco
Kumite -75 kg	Rafael Aghayev; Azerbaijan	Majed Alkhalifah; Saudi Arabia	Ahmed Hammi; Morocco
Kumite -75 kg	Rafael Aghayev; Azerbaijan	Majed Alkhalifah; Saudi Arabia	Erman Eltemur; Turkey
Kumite -84 kg	Aykhan Mamayev; Azerbaijan	Gokhan Gunduz; Turkey	Mohamed El Kotby; Egypt
Kumite -84 kg	Aykhan Mamayev; Azerbaijan	Gokhan Gunduz; Turkey	Ahmed Elmasry; Egypt
Kumite +84 kg	Ahmed Elasfar; Egypt	Enes Erkan; Turkey	Achraf Ouchen; Morocco
Kumite +84 kg	Ahmed Elasfar; Egypt	Enes Erkan; Turkey	Alparslan Yamanoglu; Turkey
Team kata	Morocco; Mohammed Elhanni; Adnane Elhakimi; Bilal Benkacem	Algeria; Adel Amrouche; Salah Eddine Sekkour; Smail Rabehi	Morocco; Ayoub Tannouche; Souhail Zaraoui; Mohamed Chaari
Team kata	Morocco; Mohammed Elhanni; Adnane Elhakimi; Bilal Benkacem	Algeria; Adel Amrouche; Salah Eddine Sekkour; Smail Rabehi	Turkey; Gokay Ilgezdi; Fatih Selman; Ali Sofuoglu

=== Women ===
Event	Gold	Silver	Bronze
Individual kata	Viviana Bottaro; Italy	Raquel Roy Rubio; Spain	Dilara Bozan; Turkey
Individual kata	Viviana Bottaro; Italy	Raquel Roy Rubio; Spain	Terryana D'Onofrio; Italy
Kumite -50 kg	Radwa Sayed; Egypt	Serap Özçelik; Turkey	Lucia Kovacikova; Slovakia
Kumite -50 kg	Radwa Sayed; Egypt	Serap Özçelik; Turkey	Sevil Bas; Turkey
Kumite -55 kg	Aya Shaaban; Egypt	Yassmin Attia; Egypt	Sara Cardin; Italy
Kumite -55 kg	Aya Shaaban; Egypt	Yassmin Attia; Egypt	Wen Tzu-Yun; Chinese Taipei
Kumite -61 kg	Najlae Karchali; Morocco	Xiaoyan Yin; China	Boutheina Hasnaoui; Tunisia
Kumite -61 kg	Najlae Karchali; Morocco	Xiaoyan Yin; China	Btissam Sadini; Morocco
Kumite -68 kg	Silvia Semeraro; Italy	Miroslava Kopunova; Slovakia	Fatima Zahra Errabi; Morocco
Kumite -68 kg	Silvia Semeraro; Italy	Miroslava Kopunova; Slovakia	Nada Mohamed; Egypt
Kumite +68 kg	Dominika Tatarova; Slovakia	Sofia Kloucha; France	Feryal Abdelaziz; Egypt
Kumite +68 kg	Dominika Tatarova; Slovakia	Sofia Kloucha; France	Mengmeng Gao; China
Team kata	Morocco; Lamyae Bertali; Aya Nassiri; Sanae Agalmam	Turkey; Gizem Sahin; Rabia Kusmus; Dilara Bozan	

== Karate1 Premier League - Halle/ Leipzig 2017 ==
The Karate 1 Premier League – Halle/Leipzig 2017 was held on 8–10 September 2017 in Halle/Leipzig, Germany.

=== Men ===
Event	Gold	Silver	Bronze
Individual kata	Ryo Kiyuna; Japan	Issei Shimbaba; Japan	Arata Kinjo; Japan
Individual kata	Ryo Kiyuna; Japan	Issei Shimbaba; Japan	Yuhei Horiba; Japan
Kumite -60 kg	Sadriddin Saymatov; Uzbekistan	Senthilkumar Selvarajoo; Malaysia	Aykut Kaya; Turkey
Kumite -60 kg	Sadriddin Saymatov; Uzbekistan	Senthilkumar Selvarajoo; Malaysia	Eray Samdan; Turkey
Kumite -67 kg	Andres Madera; Venezuela	Rinat Sagandykov; Kazakhstan	Fahad Alkhathami; Saudi Arabia
Kumite -67 kg	Andres Madera; Venezuela	Rinat Sagandykov; Kazakhstan	Ayoub Zakaria; Morocco
Kumite -75 kg	Stanislav Horuna; Ukraine	Ahmed El Sharaby; Egypt	Yuta Mori; Japan
Kumite -75 kg	Stanislav Horuna; Ukraine	Ahmed El Sharaby; Egypt	Julien Caffaro; France
Kumite -84 kg	Ryutaro Araga; Japan	Ilya Granovesov; Russia	Georgios Tzanos; Greece
Kumite -84 kg	Ryutaro Araga; Japan	Ilya Granovesov; Russia	Zabihollah Poorshab; Iran
Kumite +84 kg	Sajad Ganjzadeh; Iran	Tyron Lardy; Netherlands	Simone Marino; Italy
Kumite +84 kg	Sajad Ganjzadeh; Iran	Tyron Lardy; Netherlands	Saman Heydari; Iran
Team kata	Italy; Italy; Mattia Busato; Alfredo Tocco; Alessandro Iodice	Italy; Italy; Giuseppe Panagia; Gianluca Gallo; Samuel Stea	France; France; Loick Tranier; Sorey Morassi; Kewin Ngoan
Team kata	Italy; Italy; Mattia Busato; Alfredo Tocco; Alessandro Iodice	Italy; Italy; Giuseppe Panagia; Gianluca Gallo; Samuel Stea	France; France; Mohamed Al Qattan; Mohamed Al Mosawi; Salman Al Mosawi

=== Women ===
Event	Gold	Silver	Bronze
Individual kata	Emiri Iwamoto; Japan	Hikaru Ono; Japan	Mizuki Ugai; Japan
Individual kata	Emiri Iwamoto; Japan	Hikaru Ono; Japan	Sandra Sanchez; Spain
Kumite -50 kg	Shara Hubrich; Germany	Miho Miyahara; Japan	Ana Villanueva Fabian; Dominican Republic
Kumite -50 kg	Shara Hubrich; Germany	Miho Miyahara; Japan	Ayaka Tadano; Japan
Kumite -55 kg	Anzhelika Terlujga; Ukraine	Tuba Yakan; Turkey	Fumika Ishiai; Japan
Kumite -55 kg	Anzhelika Terlujga; Ukraine	Tuba Yakan; Turkey	Jana Bitsch; Germany
Kumite -61 kg	Nguyen Thi Ngoan; Vietnam	Haya Juma; Canada	Sara Elwart; Poland
Kumite -61 kg	Nguyen Thi Ngoan; Vietnam	Haya Juma; Canada	Leila Heurtault; France
Kumite -68 kg	Kayo Someya; Japan	Miroslava Kopunova; Slovakia	Johanna Kneer; Germany
Kumite -68 kg	Kayo Someya; Japan	Miroslava Kopunova; Slovakia	Hafsa Seyda Burucu; Turkey
Kumite +68 kg	Ayumi Uekusa; Japan	Mengmeng Gao; China	Amelia Harvey; England
Kumite +68 kg	Ayumi Uekusa; Japan	Mengmeng Gao; China	Natsumi Kawamura; Japan
Team kata	Japan; Japan; Yui Umekage; Natsuki Shimizu; Azuki Ogawa	Turkey; Turkey; Gizem Sahin; Rabia Kusmus; Dilara Bozan	Germany; Germany; Jasmin Bleul; Christine Heinrich; Sophie Wachter
Team kata	Japan; Japan; Yui Umekage; Natsuki Shimizu; Azuki Ogawa	Turkey; Turkey; Gizem Sahin; Rabia Kusmus; Dilara Bozan	Belarus; Belarus; Katsiaryna Karatkevich; Aliaksandra Fursava; Maryia Fursava
