= 2026 European Karate Championships – Women's individual kata =

Women's individual kata at the 2026 European Karate Championships
- Venue: Eissporthalle Frankfurt
- Location: Frankfurt, Germany
- Dates: 20, 23 May
- Competitors: 33 from 33 nations

Medalists
gold medal	Terryana D'Onofrio	Italy
silver medal	Paola García	Spain
bronze medal	Chiara Manca	Belgium
bronze medal	Ana Sofia Cruz	Portugal

The women's individual kata competition at the 2026 European Karate Championships was held on 20 and 23 May 2026.

== Results ==
=== Finals ===
Semifinals
(Belgium) Chiara Manca	1
(Spain) Paola García	6
(Portugal) Ana Sofia Cruz	0
(Italy) Terryana D'Onofrio	7

Final
(Spain) Paola García	3
(Italy) Terryana D'Onofrio	4

=== Repechage ===
Repechage 1
Veranika Baravik	2
(Germany) Jasmin Bleul	5

Repechage 2
(Germany) Jasmin Bleul	3
(France) Helvétia Taily	4

Bronze medal
(France) Helvétia Taily	3
(Belgium) Chiara Manca	4

Repechage 1
(Hungary) Csenge Fábián	1
(Czech Republic) Alice Jana Kirschnerová	6

Repechage 2
(Czech Republic) Alice Jana Kirschnerová	1
(Austria) Tamara Lehner	6

Bronze medal
(Austria) Tamara Lehner	1
(Portugal) Ana Sofia Cruz	6

=== Top half ===
==== Section 1 ====
Round of 64
Elena Novicikhina	1
(Luxembourg) Mia Reding	6

Round of 32
(Luxembourg) Mia Reding	2
(Slovakia) Sofia Fialková	5
(Bulgaria) Sofia Yu Vatchkov	3
(Croatia) Inga Grgić	4
(Kosovo) Alma Loki	6
(Norway) Maria Månum Moen	1
(Romania) Alexandra Stoian	0
(Belgium) Chiara Manca	7

Round of 16
(Slovakia) Sofia Fialková	6
(Croatia) Inga Grgić	1
(Kosovo) Alma Loki	0
(Belgium) Chiara Manca	7

Quarterfinals
(Slovakia) Sofia Fialková	1
(Belgium) Chiara Manca	6

==== Section 2 ====
Round of 32
(Liechtenstein) Aileen Sprenger	0
(Serbia) Neda Milošević	7
(Bosnia and Herzegovina) Ilda Muzurović	0
(France) Helvétia Taily	7
(Netherlands) Soraya Wahjudi	2
(Germany) Jasmin Bleul	5
Veranika Baravik	0
(Spain) Paola García	7

Round of 16
(Serbia) Neda Milošević	1
(France) Helvétia Taily	6
(Germany) Jasmin Bleul	2
(Spain) Paola García	5

Quarterfinals
(France) Helvétia Taily	3
(Spain) Paola García	4

=== Bottom half ===
==== Section 3 ====
Round of 32
(Montenegro) Mila Mraković
(Turkey) Keyda Nur Çolak	w/o
(Greece) Georgia-Archontia Xenou	7
(North Macedonia) Vladanka Avramova	0
(Ukraine) Halyna Zaporozhchenko	0
(Georgia (country)) Lia Khurtsilava	7
(Poland) Anna Kowalska	0
(Portugal) Ana Sofia Cruz	7

Round of 16
(Turkey) Keyda Nur Çolak	6
(Greece) Georgia-Archontia Xenou	1
(Georgia (country)) Lia Khurtsilava	1
(Portugal) Ana Sofia Cruz	6

Quarterfinals
(Turkey) Keyda Nur Çolak	2
(Portugal) Ana Sofia Cruz	5

==== Section 4 ====
Round of 32
(Malta) Jessica Vella	0
(Austria) Tamara Lehner	7
(England) Jessica Maitland	2
(Denmark) Frederikke Bjerring	5
(Switzerland) Lila Ritz	3
(Czech Republic) Alice Jana Kirschnerová	4
(Hungary) Csenge Fábián	0
(Italy) Terryana D'Onofrio	7

Round of 16
(Austria) Tamara Lehner	5
(Denmark) Frederikke Bjerring	2
(Czech Republic) Alice Jana Kirschnerová	0
(Italy) Terryana D'Onofrio	7

Quarterfinals
(Austria) Tamara Lehner	0
(Italy) Terryana D'Onofrio	7
