= 2022 European Karate Championships – Women's individual kata =

European Karate Championship

Women's individual kata at the 2022 European Karate Championships
- Venue: Karataş Şahinbey Sport Hall
- Location: Gaziantep, Turkey
- Dates: 25–28 May
- Competitors: 29 from 29 nations

Medalists
| gold medal | Sandra Sánchez | Spain |
| silver medal | Dilara Bozan | Turkey |
| bronze medal | Jasmin Jüttner | Germany |
| bronze medal | Terryana D'Onofrio | Italy |

The Women's individual kata competition at the 2022 European Karate Championships was held from 25 to 28 May 2022.

== Results ==
=== Round 1 ===
| Rank | Pool 1 | | Pool 2 | | Pool 3 | | Pool 4 | |
| Rank | Athlete | Total | Athlete | Total | Athlete | Total | Athlete | Total |
|---|---|---|---|---|---|---|---|---|
| 1 | (Portugal) Ana Sofia Cruz | 23.66 | (Turkey) Dilara Bozan | 25.08 | (Czech Republic) Veronika Mišková | 23.38 | (Spain) Sandra Sánchez | 26.20 |
| 2 | (Greece) Georgia Xenou | 23.32 | (France) Alexandra Feracci | 23.82 | (Belgium) Chiara Manca | 22.20 | (Italy) Terryana D'Onofrio | 24.36 |
| 3 | (Croatia) Sara Malčec | 22.26 | (Germany) Jasmin Jüttner | 23.18 | (Denmark) Frederikke Bjerring | 21.34 | (Montenegro) Biserka Radulović | 23.08 |
| 4 | (Netherlands) Samantha van Lokven | 22.18 | (Austria) Patricia Bahledova | 22.92 | (Serbia) Bojana Mladežić | 21.08 | (Hungary) Laura Sterck | 22.70 |
| 5 | (Switzerland) Melinda Mark | 22.12 | (Poland) Anna Kowalska | 22.08 | (Luxembourg) Anne Steinmetz | 20.02 | (Slovakia) Jana Vaňušaniková | 22.20 |
| 6 | (Romania) Diana Turcu | 21.52 | (Israel) Nicol Pyzh | 21.60 | (Finland) Bess Mänty | 19.82 | (North Macedonia) Puleksenija Jovanovska | 22.16 |
| 7 | (Sweden) Mia Karlsson | 20.32 | (Wales) Maisie McPartlin | 19.46 | (Scotland) Aria Pascual | 0 | (Kosovo) Vlerona Shala | 20.42 |
| 8 | (Bosnia and Herzegovina) Ilda Muzurović | 20.26 | | | | | | |

=== Round 2 ===
| Rank | Pool 1 | | Pool 2 | |
| Rank | Athlete | Total | Athlete | Total |
|---|---|---|---|---|
| 1 | (Turkey) Dilara Bozan | 24.74 | (Spain) Sandra Sánchez | 25.74 |
| 2 | (Germany) Jasmin Jüttner | 24.54 | (Italy) Terryana D'Onofrio | 23.94 |
| 3 | (Portugal) Ana Sofia Cruz | 24.34 | (Czech Republic) Veronika Mišková | 23.76 |
| 4 | (Greece) Georgia Xenou | 23.08 | (Belgium) Chiara Manca | 22.88 |
| 5 | (France) Alexandra Feracci | 22.80 | (Montenegro) Biserka Radulović | 22.76 |
| 6 | (Croatia) Sara Malčec | 22.80 | (Serbia) Bojana Mladežić | 22.72 |
| 7 | (Austria) Patricia Bahledova | 21.34 | (Hungary) Laura Sterck | 21.94 |
| 8 | (Netherlands) Samantha van Lokven | 21.28 | (Denmark) Frederikke Bjerring | 21.92 |

=== Round 3 ===
| Rank | Pool 1 | | Pool 2 | |
| Rank | Athlete | Total | Athlete | Total |
|---|---|---|---|---|
| 1 | (Turkey) Dilara Bozan | 24.74 | (Spain) Sandra Sánchez | 26.00 |
| 2 | (Germany) Jasmin Jüttner | 24.32 | (Italy) Terryana D'Onofrio | 24.80 |
| 3 | (Portugal) Ana Sofia Cruz | 23.72 | (Czech Republic) Veronika Mišková | 24.34 |
| 4 | (Greece) Georgia Xenou | 22.88 | (Belgium) Chiara Manca | 23.74 |

=== Finals ===
| Final |
| (Turkey) Dilara Bozan | 25.70 |
| (Spain) Sandra Sánchez | 27.20 |

Bronze medal
(Germany) Jasmin Jüttner | 25.18
(Czech Republic) Veronika Mišková | 24.68
(Portugal) Ana Sofia Cruz | 24.94
(Italy) Terryana D'Onofrio | 26.40
