= 2024 European Karate Championships – Women's individual kata =

European Karate Championship

Women's individual kata at the 2024 European Karate Championships
- Venue: Krešimir Ćosić Hall
- Location: Zadar, Croatia
- Dates: 8, 11 May
- Competitors: 29 from 29 nations

Medalists
gold medal	Dilara Bozan	Turkey
silver medal	Terryana D'Onofrio	Italy
bronze medal	Paola García	Spain
bronze medal	Jasmin Jüttner	Germany

The women's individual kata competition at the 2024 European Karate Championships was held on 8 and 11 May 2024.

== Results ==
=== Final ===
Final
(Italy) Terryana D'Onofrio	42.40
(Turkey) Dilara Bozan	42.40

=== Top half ===
Round of 32
(Azerbaijan) Ramila Heydarova	38.80
(Norway) Maria Manum Moen	36.80
(Authorised Neutral Athletes) Veronica Baravik	38.90
(Lithuania) Miglė Jatulytė	32.90
(Bosnia and Herzegovina) Kristina Stanojević	36.20
(Kosovo) Alma Loki	37.20
(Croatia) Sara Malčec	38.00
(Spain) Paola García	40.50
(Iceland) Una Borg Garðarsdóttir	37.00
(Czech Republic) Veronika Mišková	39.10
(Finland) Bess Mänty	37.70
(France) Helvétia Taily	36.80
(Belgium) Chiara Manca	37.80
(Liechtenstein) Aileen Sprenger	32.90

Round of 16
(Azerbaijan) Ramila Heydarova	39.20
(Authorised Neutral Athletes) Veronica Baravik	38.10
(Kosovo) Alma Loki	38.20
(Spain) Paola García	40.90
(Czech Republic) Veronika Mišková	39.40
(Finland) Bess Mänty	38.50
(Belgium) Chiara Manca	40.10
(Italy) Terryana D'Onofrio	40.80

Quarterfinals
(Azerbaijan) Ramila Heydarova	38.40
(Spain) Paola García	41.20
(Czech Republic) Veronika Mišková	40.90
(Italy) Terryana D'Onofrio	41.60

Semifinals
(Spain) Paola García	41.40
(Italy) Terryana D'Onofrio	42.20

=== Bottom half ===
Round of 32
(Denmark) Frederikke Bjerring	37.50
(Slovakia) Michaela Čukanová	35.60
(Serbia) Neda Milošević	36.90
(Germany) Jasmin Jüttner	39.10
(Hungary) Zita Fábián	38.30
(Poland) Anna Kowalska	34.50
(Moldova) Elena Berezovskaia	36.40
(Ukraine) Halyna Zaporozhchenko	37.80
(Montenegro) Mila Mraković	34.20
(Greece) Georgia Xenou	38.00
(Scotland) Aria Pascual	36.20
(Switzerland) Lanyfer Miñano	37.70

Round of 16
(Denmark) Frederikke Bjerring	38.10
(Germany) Jasmin Jüttner	40.40
(Hungary) Zita Fábián	38.50
(Portugal) Ana Sofia Cruz	40.10
(Ukraine) Halyna Zaporozhchenko	36.90
(Greece) Georgia Xenou	38.70
(Switzerland) Lanyfer Miñano	37.50
(Turkey) Dilara Bozan	39.50

Quarterfinals
(Germany) Jasmin Jüttner	41.20
(Portugal) Ana Sofia Cruz	40.10
(Greece) Georgia Xenou	39.00
(Turkey) Dilara Bozan	39.20

Semifinals
(Germany) Jasmin Jüttner	40.70
(Turkey) Dilara Bozan	41.50

=== Repechage ===
Repechage round 1
(Belgium) Chiara Manca	39.60
(Czech Republic) Veronika Mišková	39.90
(Switzerland) Lanyfer Miñano	38.20
(Greece) Georgia Xenou	40.30

Bronze medal match
(Spain) Paola García	42.50
(Czech Republic) Veronika Mišková	40.80
(Germany) Jasmin Jüttner	41.60
(Greece) Georgia Xenou	40.40
