= Ekici =

Ekici is a Turkish surname. Notable people with the surname include:

- Alaettin Ekici (born 2009), Turkish footballer
- Mehmet Ekici (born 1990), Turkish footballer
- Oya Ekici (born 1975), Turkish female para-karateka
- Volkan Ekici (born 1991), Turkish footballer
