= Karate at the 2015 European Games – Women's individual kata =

Karate competition

Women's individual kata at the 2015 European Games
- Venue: Baku Crystal Hall
- Date: June 14, 2015
- Competitors: 8 from 8 nations

Medalists
gold medal	Sandra Sánchez	Spain
silver medal	Sandy Scordo	France
bronze medal	Dilara Bozan	Turkey

The Women's individual kata competition at the 2015 European Games in Baku, Azerbaijan was held on 14 June 2015 at the Crystal Hall.

== Schedule ==
All times are Azerbaijan Summer Time (UTC+5).

Date	Time	Event
Sunday, 14 June 2015	10:00	Elimination Round
Sunday, 14 June 2015	15:30	Semifinals
Sunday, 14 June 2015	18:00	Finals

== Results ==
Legend

- KK — Forfeit (Kiken)

=== Elimination round ===
==== Group A ====
Athlete	Pld	W	D	L	Points		
Athlete	Pld	W	D	L	GF	GA	Diff
Sandra Sánchez (ESP)	3	3	0	0	14	1	+13
Sandy Scordo (FRA)	3	2	0	1	9	6	+3
Veronika Mišková (CZE)	3	1	0	2	7	8	-1
Karen Dolphin (IRL)	3	0	0	3	0	15	-15

	Score	
Sandra Sánchez (ESP)	5–0	Karen Dolphin (IRL)
Veronika Mišková (CZE)	2–3	Sandy Scordo (FRA)
Sandra Sánchez (ESP)	4–1	Sandy Scordo (FRA)
Veronika Mišková (CZE)	5–0	Karen Dolphin (IRL)
Karen Dolphin (IRL)	0–5	Sandy Scordo (FRA)
Sandra Sánchez (ESP)	5–0	Veronika Mišková (CZE)

==== Group B ====
Athlete	Pld	W	D	L	Points		
Athlete	Pld	W	D	L	GF	GA	Diff
Dilara Bozan (TUR)	3	3	0	0	14	1	+13
Jasmin Bleul (GER)	3	2	0	1	11	4	+7
Vlatka Kiuk (CRO)	3	1	0	2	5	10	-5
Adila Gurbanova (AZE)	3	0	0	3	0	15	-15

	Score	
Dilara Bozan (TUR)	5–0	Vlatka Kiuk (CRO)
Jasmin Bleul (GER)	5–0	Adila Gurbanova (AZE)
Dilara Bozan (TUR)	5–0	Adila Gurbanova (AZE)
Jasmin Bleul (GER)	5–0	Vlatka Kiuk (CRO)
Vlatka Kiuk (CRO)	5–0	Adila Gurbanova (AZE)
Dilara Bozan (TUR)	4–1	Jasmin Bleul (GER)

=== Finals ===
Semifinals
Sandra Sánchez (ESP)	5
Jasmin Bleul (GER)	0
Sandy Scordo (FRA)	3
Dilara Bozan (TUR)	2

Gold medal match
Sandra Sánchez (ESP)	5
Sandy Scordo (FRA)	0
Bronze medal match
Jasmin Bleul (GER)	0
Dilara Bozan (TUR)	5
