= 2023 European Karate Championships – Women's individual kata =

European Karate Championship

Women's individual kata at the 2023 European Karate Championships
- Venue: Palacio Multiusos de Guadalajara
- Location: Guadalajara, Spain
- Dates: 22, 25 March
- Competitors: 29 from 29 nations

Medalists
gold medal	Paola García	Spain
silver medal	Helvétia Taily	France
bronze medal	Terryana D'Onofrio	Italy
bronze medal	Dilara Bozan	Turkey

The Women's individual kata competition at the 2023 European Karate Championships was held on 22 and 25 March 2023.

== Results ==
=== Round 1 ===
Rank	Pool 1		Pool 2		Pool 3		Pool 4	
Rank	Athlete	Total	Athlete	Total	Athlete	Total	Athlete	Total
1	(Italy) Terryana D'Onofrio	42.2	(Spain) Paola García	41.9	(Greece) Georgia Xenou	40.3	(Turkey) Dilara Bozan	40.8
2	(Portugal) Ana Sofia Cruz	40.7	(Germany) Jasmin Jüttner	41.2	(Czech Republic) Veronika Mišková	40.2	(France) Helvétia Taily	39.4
3	(Croatia) Sara Malčec	38.4	(Slovakia) Jana Vaňušaniková	38.6	(Hungary) Laura Sterck	38.7	(Serbia) Bojana Mladežić	36.6
4	(Netherlands) Soraya Wahjudi	38.2	(Austria) Patricia Bahledova	37.6	(Montenegro) Biserka Radulović	38.3	(England) Nicole Turner	36.2
5	(Switzerland) Melinda Mark	37.2	(Bosnia and Herzegovina) Isidora Borovčanin	36.0	(Finland) Bess Mänty	37.0	(North Macedonia) Martina Arsovska	35.4
6	(Denmark) Frederikke Bjerring	36.6	(Republic of Ireland) Eimear Porter	34.6	(Ukraine) Halyna Zaporozhchenko	36.1	(Belgium) Chiara Manca	34.9
7	(Poland) Anna Kowalska	36.4	(Liechtenstein) Aileen Sprenger	32.5	(Slovenia) Lana Nadizar	35.2	(Moldova) Elena Berezovskaia	29.7
8	(Romania) Izabella Constanzo	35.4						

=== Round 2 ===
Rank	Pool 1		Pool 2	
Rank	Athlete	Total	Athlete	Total
1	(Spain) Paola García	42.3	(France) Helvétia Taily	40.5
2	(Italy) Terryana D'Onofrio	41.8	(Turkey) Dilara Bozan	40.5
3	(Portugal) Ana Sofia Cruz	40.8	(Czech Republic) Veronika Mišková	39.6
4	(Germany) Jasmin Jüttner	39.7	(Greece) Georgia Xenou	38.2
5	(Netherlands) Soraya Wahjudi	38.3	(Montenegro) Biserka Radulović	38.1
6	(Slovakia) Jana Vaňušaniková	38.1	(Hungary) Laura Sterck	37.9
7	(Austria) Patricia Bahledova	37.8	(Serbia) Bojana Mladežić	36.5
8	(Croatia) Sara Malčec	37.8	(England) Nicole Turner	36.0

=== Round 3 ===
Rank	Pool 1		Pool 2	
Rank	Athlete	Total	Athlete	Total
1	(Spain) Paola García	44.3	(France) Helvétia Taily	41.8
2	(Italy) Terryana D'Onofrio	42.6	(Turkey) Dilara Bozan	41.3
3	(Portugal) Ana Sofia Cruz	41.3	(Czech Republic) Veronika Mišková	39.8
4	(Germany) Jasmin Jüttner	40.9	(Greece) Georgia Xenou	38.7

=== Finals ===
Final
(Spain) Paola García	42.6
(France) Helvétia Taily	41.2

Bronze medal
(Italy) Terryana D'Onofrio	41.7
(Czech Republic) Veronika Mišková	41.0
(Portugal) Ana Sofia Cruz	41.5
(Turkey) Dilara Bozan	42.9
