= 2024 European Karate Championships – Women's team kata =

European Karate Championship

Women's team kata at the 2024 European Karate Championships
- Venue: Krešimir Ćosić Hall
- Location: Zadar, Croatia
- Dates: 9, 12 May
- Nations: 11
- Teams: 11

Medalists
gold medal	María López; Gema Ozuna; Raquel Roy	Spain
silver medal	Terryana D'Onofrio; Michela Rizzo; Elena Roversi	Italy
bronze medal	Damla Su Türemen; Zehra Kaya; Damla Pelit; Elif Karaboğa	Turkey
bronze medal	Maï-Linh Bui; Marie Bui; Léa Severan	France

The Women's team kata competition at the 2024 European Karate Championships was held on 9 and 12 May 2024.

== Results ==
Round of 16
Portugal	39.40
Bosnia and Herzegovina	35.00
Croatia	38.50
Czech Republic	38.90
Germany	37.60
Switzerland	38.40

Quarterfinals
Portugal	39.40
Turkey	40.30
Czech Republic	38.90
Spain	41.00
Switzerland	37.50
France	39.70
Serbia	37.00
Italy	40.00

Semifinals
Turkey	38.00
Spain	40.60
France	39.30
Italy	41.20

Final
Spain	42.80
Italy	42.70

=== Repechage ===
Bronze medal match
Turkey	41.40
Czech Republic	38.90
France	41.30
Serbia	39.00
