= 2022 European Karate Championships =

International sporting competition

- Venue: Karataş Şahinbey Sport Hall
- Location: Gaziantep, Turkey
- Dates: 25–29 May
- Competitors: 505 from 44 nations

The 2022 European Karate Championships was the 57th edition of the European Karate Championships and 4th European Para Karate Championships, held in Gaziantep, Turkey from 25 to 29 May 2022.

== Medal table ==
* Host nation (Turkey)

Rank	Nation	Gold	Silver	Bronze	Total
1	Turkey*	7	1	1	9
2	Croatia	2	1	1	4
3	Spain	1	3	1	5
4	Italy	1	2	4	7
5	Slovakia	1	2	0	3
6	Hungary	1	1	0	2
7	France	1	0	7	8
8	Ukraine	1	0	3	4
9	Serbia	1	0	0	1
10	Greece	0	1	4	5
11	Azerbaijan	0	1	2	3
12	Belgium	0	1	1	2
12	Germany	0	1	1	2
14	Bulgaria	0	1	0	1
14	England	0	1	0	1
16	Georgia	0	0	1	1
16	Israel	0	0	1	1
16	Kosovo	0	0	1	1
16	North Macedonia	0	0	1	1
16	Portugal	0	0	1	1
16	Scotland	0	0	1	1
16	Switzerland	0	0	1	1
Totals (22 entries)		16	16	32	64

== Medalists ==
=== Men ===
Event	Gold	Silver	Bronze
Individual kata	Ali Sofuoğlu; Turkey	Damián Quintero; Spain	Yuki Ujihara; Switzerland
Individual kata	Ali Sofuoğlu; Turkey	Damián Quintero; Spain	Mattia Busato; Italy
Team kata	Turkey; Emre Vefa Göktaş; Enes Özdemir; Ali Sofuoğlu	Spain; Sergio Galán; Óscar García; Alejandro Manzana	Italy; Mattia Busato; Gianluca Gallo; Alessandro Iodice
Team kata	Turkey; Emre Vefa Göktaş; Enes Özdemir; Ali Sofuoğlu	Spain; Sergio Galán; Óscar García; Alejandro Manzana	Azerbaijan; Rovshan Aliyev; Tural Baljanli; Ismayil Guliyev
Kumite −60 kg	Eray Şamdan; Turkey	Angelo Crescenzo; Italy	Ronen Gehtbarg; Israel
Kumite −60 kg	Eray Şamdan; Turkey	Angelo Crescenzo; Italy	Christos-Stefanos Xenos; Greece
Kumite −67 kg	Burak Uygur; Turkey	Dionysios Xenos; Greece	Joaquim Mendes; Portugal
Kumite −67 kg	Burak Uygur; Turkey	Dionysios Xenos; Greece	Steven Da Costa; France
Kumite −75 kg	Erman Eltemur; Turkey	Brandon Wilkins; England	Elhami Shabani; Kosovo
Kumite −75 kg	Erman Eltemur; Turkey	Brandon Wilkins; England	Luigi Busà; Italy
Kumite −84 kg	Dániel György; Hungary	Enes Garibović; Croatia	Petar Spasenovski; North Macedonia
Kumite −84 kg	Dániel György; Hungary	Enes Garibović; Croatia	Walid Deghali; Belgium
Kumite +84 kg	Anđelo Kvesić; Croatia	Luca Costa; Belgium	Ryzvan Talibov; Ukraine
Kumite +84 kg	Anđelo Kvesić; Croatia	Luca Costa; Belgium	Gogita Arkania; Georgia
Team kumite	France; Enzo Berthon; Kilian Cizo; Hendrick Confiac; Jessie Da Costa; Steven Da Costa; Mehdi Filali; Younesse Salmi	Azerbaijan; Panah Abdullayev; Tural Aghalarzade; Rafael Aghayev; Asiman Gurbanli; Rafiz Hasanov; Turgut Hasanov; Aykhan Mamayev	Ukraine; Valerii Chobotar; Stanislav Horuna; Valerii Sonnykh; Ryzvan Talibov; Andrii Toroshanko; Kostiantyn Tsymbal; Andrii Zaplitnyi
Team kumite	France; Enzo Berthon; Kilian Cizo; Hendrick Confiac; Jessie Da Costa; Steven Da Costa; Mehdi Filali; Younesse Salmi	Azerbaijan; Panah Abdullayev; Tural Aghalarzade; Rafael Aghayev; Asiman Gurbanli; Rafiz Hasanov; Turgut Hasanov; Aykhan Mamayev	Greece; Theoharis Giannakos; Konstantinos Mastrogiannis; Dimitrios Stolis; Georgios Tzanos; Christos-Stefanos Xenos; Dionysios Xenos

=== Women ===
Event	Gold	Silver	Bronze
Individual kata	Sandra Sánchez; Spain	Dilara Bozan; Turkey	Jasmin Jüttner; Germany
Individual kata	Sandra Sánchez; Spain	Dilara Bozan; Turkey	Terryana D'Onofrio; Italy
Team kata	Italy; Carola Casale; Terryana D'Onofrio; Michela Pezzetti	Spain; María López; Lidia Rodríguez; Raquel Roy	Turkey; Zehra Kaya; Damla Pelit; Damla Su Türemen
Team kata	Italy; Carola Casale; Terryana D'Onofrio; Michela Pezzetti	Spain; María López; Lidia Rodríguez; Raquel Roy	France; Alexandra Feracci; Laetitia Feracci; Laura Pieri
Kumite −50 kg	Serap Özçelik; Turkey	Erminia Perfetto; Italy	Niswa Ahmed; France
Kumite −50 kg	Serap Özçelik; Turkey	Erminia Perfetto; Italy	Jelena Pehar; Croatia
Kumite −55 kg	Anzhelika Terliuga; Ukraine	Ivet Goranova; Bulgaria	Madina Sadigova; Azerbaijan
Kumite −55 kg	Anzhelika Terliuga; Ukraine	Ivet Goranova; Bulgaria	Amy Connell; Scotland
Kumite −61 kg	Ingrida Suchánková; Slovakia	Anna Miggou; Germany	Anita Serogina; Ukraine
Kumite −61 kg	Ingrida Suchánková; Slovakia	Anna Miggou; Germany	Laura Sivert; France
Kumite −68 kg	Eda Eltemur; Turkey	Miroslava Kopúňová; Slovakia	Vasiliki Panetsidou; Greece
Kumite −68 kg	Eda Eltemur; Turkey	Miroslava Kopúňová; Slovakia	Alizée Agier; France
Kumite +68 kg	Ivana Perović; Serbia	Aicha Boussebaa; Hungary	Kyriaki Kydonaki; Greece
Kumite +68 kg	Ivana Perović; Serbia	Aicha Boussebaa; Hungary	Nancy Garcia; France
Team kumite	Croatia; Sadea Bećirović; Lucija Lesjak; Lea Vukoja; Mia Greta Zorko	Slovakia; Miroslava Kopúňová; Lucia Kováčiková; Hana Kuklová; Ingrida Suchánková	Spain; María Espinosa; Carlota Fernández; María Nieto; María Torres
Team kumite	Croatia; Sadea Bećirović; Lucija Lesjak; Lea Vukoja; Mia Greta Zorko	Slovakia; Miroslava Kopúňová; Lucia Kováčiková; Hana Kuklová; Ingrida Suchánková	France; Alizée Agier; Léa Avazeri; Laura Sivert; Jennifer Zameto

== Participating nations ==
505 athletes from 44 countries participated:

1. Albania (4)
2. Armenia (6)
3. Austria (12)
4. Azerbaijan (17)
5. Belgium (10)
6. Bosnia and Herzegovina (26)
7. Bulgaria (9)
8. Croatia (24)
9. Cyprus (9)
10. Czech Republic (5)
11. Denmark (6)
12. England (3)
13. Spain (20)
14. Estonia (3)
15. Finland (8)
16. France (22)
17. Georgia (9)
18. Germany (14)
19. Greece (14)
20. Hungary (16)
21. Iceland (3)
22. Ireland (6)
23. Israel (10)
24. Italy (20)
25. Kosovo (15)
26. Latvia (7)
27. Lithuania (3)
28. Luxembourg (7)
29. North Macedonia (17)
30. Montenegro (19)
31. Netherlands (7)
32. Norway (2)
33. Poland (12)
34. Portugal (15)
35. Romania (17)
36. Scotland (6)
37. Serbia (17)
38. Slovakia (14)
39. Slovenia (8)
40. Sweden (9)
41. Switzerland (11)
42. Turkey (21)
43. Ukraine (18)
44. Wales (3)
45. Refugee Karate Team (1)

== Para-Karate ==
Event	Gold	Silver	Bronze
Men's K-10	Dorin Alexe; Romania	Nihat Mammadzada; Azerbaijan	Francisco José Lozano; Spain
Men's K-10	Dorin Alexe; Romania	Nihat Mammadzada; Azerbaijan	Nohan Dudon; France
Men's K-21	Ruiz Carlos Huertas; Spain	Albert Singer; Germany	János Csatári; Hungary
Men's K-21	Ruiz Carlos Huertas; Spain	Albert Singer; Germany	Antonio Pereira; Portugal
Men's K-22	Víctor Manuel Arevalo; Spain	Mattia Allesina; Italy	Jordan Fonteney; France
Men's K-22	Víctor Manuel Arevalo; Spain	Mattia Allesina; Italy	Marvin Nöltge; Germany
Men's K-30	Eldar Ahmadov; Azerbaijan	Vicente Yangüez Santalla; Spain	Joni Tophuria; Georgia
Men's K-30	Eldar Ahmadov; Azerbaijan	Vicente Yangüez Santalla; Spain	Juan Antonio Fuentes; Spain
Women's K-10	Emiliya Mitlinova; Azerbaijan	Benedetta Belotti; Italy	Karmen Vask; Estonia
Women's K-10	Emiliya Mitlinova; Azerbaijan	Benedetta Belotti; Italy	Veronika Kamenská; Czech Republic
Women's K-21	Olívia Kákosy; Hungary	Lucía Sánchez Rosado; Spain	Diandra Bekčič; Slovenia
Women's K-21	Olívia Kákosy; Hungary	Lucía Sánchez Rosado; Spain	Charlène Odin; France
Women's K-22	Daniela Topic; Croatia	María De LeónL opez Spain	Alexandra Szabo; Hungary
Women's K-30	Isabel Fernandez Jimenez; Spain	Mürvet Demirtaş; Turkey	Oya Ekici; Turkey
Women's K-30	Isabel Fernandez Jimenez; Spain	Mürvet Demirtaş; Turkey	Virginie Ballario; France

=== Medal table ===
* Host nation (Turkey)

Rank	Nation	Gold	Silver	Bronze	Total
1	Spain (ESP)	3	3	2	8
2	Azerbaijan (AZE)	2	1	0	3
3	Hungary (HUN)	1	0	2	3
4	Croatia (CRO)	1	0	0	1
4	Romania (ROU)	1	0	0	1
6	Italy (ITA)	0	2	0	2
7	Germany (GER)	0	1	1	2
7	Turkey (TUR)*	0	1	1	2
9	France (FRA)	0	0	4	4
10	Czech Republic (CZE)	0	0	1	1
10	Estonia (EST)	0	0	1	1
10	Georgia (GEO)	0	0	1	1
10	Portugal (POR)	0	0	1	1
10	Slovenia (SLO)	0	0	1	1
Totals (14 entries)		8	8	15	31

=== Participating nations ===
50 athletes from 16 countries participated:

1. Azerbaijan (5)
2. Croatia (3)
3. Czech Republic (1)
4. Estonia (2)
5. France (4)
6. Georgia (1)
7. Germany (4)
8. Hungary (6)
9. Italy (5)
10. Kosovo (1)
11. Portugal (2)
12. Romania (1)
13. Slovenia (1)
14. Spain (8)
15. Turkey (5)
16. Ukraine (1)
