= Karate at the 2023 European Games – Women's individual kata =

Women's individual kata at the 2023 European Games
- Venue: Bielsko-Biała Arena
- Date: 22 June
- Competitors: 8 from 8 nations

Medalists
gold medal	Paola García	Spain
silver medal	Helvétia Taily	France
bronze medal	Georgina Xenou	Greece
bronze medal	Ana Cruz	Portugal

The women's individual kata competition at the 2023 European Games was held on 22 June 2023 at the Bielsko-Biała Arena.

== Results ==
=== Elimination round ===
Pool A

Pos	Athlete	B	W	L	PF	PA	(France)	(Portugal)	(Czech Republic)	(Poland)
1	Helvétia Taily (FRA)	3	3	0	124.6	120.0	—	42.3	41.8	40.5
2	Ana Cruz (POR)	3	2	1	123.5	121.9	41.2	—	41.9	40.4
3	Veronika Mišková (CZE)	3	1	2	124.2	121.7	41.2	41.7	—	41.3
4	Anna Kowalska (POL)	3	0	3	113.5	122.2	37.6	37.9	38.0	—

Source: EG2023

Pool B

Pos	Athlete	B	W	L	PF	PA	(Spain)	(Greece)	(Turkey)	(Denmark)
1	Paola García (ESP)	3	3	0	128.1	122.7	—	42.4	43.2	42.5
2	Georgina Xenou (GRE)	3	2	1	125.5	122.2	41.8	—	41.9	41.8
3	Dilara Bozan (TUR)	3	1	2	124.4	121.9	41.9	41.2	—	41.3
4	Frederikke Lilly Bjerring (DEN)	3	0	3	114.4	125.6	39.0	38.6	36.8	—

Source: EG2023

=== Finals ===
Semifinals
Georgina Xenou (GRE)	42.3
Helvétia Taily (FRA)	42.5
Ana Cruz (POR)	42.0
Paola García (ESP)	43.4

Gold medal bout
Helvétia Taily (FRA)	41.2
Paola García (ESP)	43.9
