= 2025 European Karate Championships – Women's individual kata =

European Karate Championship

Women's individual kata at the 2025 European Karate Championships
- Venue: Karen Demirchyan Complex
- Location: Yerevan, Armenia
- Dates: 7–10 May
- Competitors: 34 from 32 nations

Medalists
gold medal	Terryana D'Onofrio	Italy
silver medal	Helvétia Taily	France
bronze medal	Dilara Bozan	Turkey
bronze medal	Paola García	Spain

The women's individual kata competition at the 2025 European Karate Championships was held from 7 to 10 May 2025.

== Results ==
=== Final ===
Final
(France) Helvétia Taily	41.60
(Italy) Terryana D'Onofrio	42.10

=== Top half ===
Round of 64
	Score	
(France) Helvétia Taily	39.70-37.80	(Slovakia) Nataša Gamová

Round of 32
(France) Helvétia Taily	39.10
(Bosnia and Herzegovina) Ilda Muzurović	36.00
(Norway) Maria Månum Moen	37.20
(North Macedonia) Vladanka Avramova	36.40
(Hungary) Zita Fábián	36.70
(Georgia (country)) Lia Khurtsilava	37.60
(Greece) Georgia Xenou	38.80
(Turkey) Dilara Bozan	40.40
Veranika Baravik	37.10
(Sweden) Mia Karlsson	38.50
(Kosovo) Alma Loki	35.50
(Ukraine) Halyna Zaporozhchenko	37.00
(Iceland) Una Borg Garðarsdóttir	36.00
(Switzerland) Lanyfer Miñano	37.90
(Croatia) Sara Malčec	37.60
(Austria) Tamara Lehner	37.60

Round of 16
(France) Helvétia Taily	40.90
(Norway) Maria Månum Moen	37.50
(Georgia (country)) Lia Khurtsilava	38.50
(Turkey) Dilara Bozan	40.10
(Sweden) Mia Karlsson	37.90
(Ukraine) Halyna Zaporozhchenko	36.30
(Switzerland) Lanyfer Miñano	38.40
(Austria) Tamara Lehner	39.00

Quarterfinals
(France) Helvétia Taily	41.30
(Turkey) Dilara Bozan	40.40
(Sweden) Mia Karlsson	39.00
(Austria) Tamara Lehner	38.10

Semifinals
(France) Helvétia Taily	40.20
(Sweden) Mia Karlsson	38.70

=== Bottom half ===
Round of 64
	Score	
(Finland) Bess Mänty	37.20-38.00	Anna Shcherbina

Round of 32
Anna Shcherbina	38.80
(Serbia) Mina Nikolić	39.10
(Poland) Emilia Wysocka	36.30
(Germany) Jasmin Jüttner	38.50
(Czech Republic) Veronika Mišková	39.30
(Republic of Ireland) Eimear Porter	35.80
(England) Jordanna Williams	38.40
(Italy) Terryana D'Onofrio	40.30
(Portugal) Ana Sofia Cruz	38.60
(Scotland) Aria Pascual	35.70
(Romania) Isabella Costanzo	36.20
(Denmark) Frederikke Bjerring	37.00
(Malta) Jessica Vella	34.00
(Montenegro) Mila Mraković	35.10
(Belgium) Chiara Manca	37.20
(Spain) Paola García	39.40

Round of 16
(Serbia) Mina Nikolić	37.60
(Germany) Jasmin Jüttner	0
(Czech Republic) Veronika Mišková	39.60
(Italy) Terryana D'Onofrio	40.50
(Portugal) Ana Sofia Cruz	39.00
(Denmark) Frederikke Bjerring	36.20
(Montenegro) Mila Mraković	35.40
(Spain) Paola García	39.40

Quarterfinals
(Germany) Jasmin Jüttner	40.00
(Italy) Terryana D'Onofrio	41.70
(Portugal) Ana Sofia Cruz	38.90
(Spain) Paola García	41.00

Semifinals
(Italy) Terryana D'Onofrio	41.20
(Spain) Paola García	40.50

=== Repechage ===
Repechage round 1
(Bosnia and Herzegovina) Ilda Muzurović	34.00
(Slovakia) Nataša Gamová	37.30

Repechage round 2
(Norway) Maria Månum Moen	34.40
(Slovakia) Nataša Gamová	37.90
(England) Jordanna Williams	37.50
(Czech Republic) Veronika Mišková	37.70

Repechage round 3
(Slovakia) Nataša Gamová	37.60
(Turkey) Dilara Bozan	39.70
(Czech Republic) Veronika Mišková	38.60
(Germany) Jasmin Jüttner	38.80

Bronze medals
(Sweden) Mia Karlsson	39.40
(Turkey) Dilara Bozan	40.80
(Spain) Paola García	42.70
(Germany) Jasmin Jüttner	41.20
