= 2022 European Karate Championships – Women's team kata =

European Karate Championship

Women's team kata at the 2022 European Karate Championships
- Venue: Karataş Şahinbey Sport Hall
- Location: Gaziantep, Turkey
- Dates: 26–29 May
- Competitors: 33 from 11 nations
- Teams: 11

Medalists
gold medal	Carola Casale; Terryana D'Onofrio; Michela Pezzetti	Italy
silver medal	María López; Lidia Rodríguez; Raquel Roy	Spain
bronze medal	Zehra Kaya; Damla Pelit; Damla Su Türemen	Turkey
bronze medal	Alexandra Feracci; Laetitia Feracci; Laura Pieri	France

The Women's team kata competition at the 2022 European Karate Championships was held from 26 to 29 May 2022.

== Results ==
=== Round 1 ===
Rank	Pool 1		Pool 2	
Rank	Team	Total	Team	Total
1	Spain	25.08	Italy	25.26
2	Turkey	24.34	France	24.28
3	Portugal	23.40	Montenegro	23.34
4	Hungary	22.92	Croatia	22.86
5	Bosnia and Herzegovina	21.56	Serbia	22.72
6	Romania	20.22		

=== Round 2 ===
Rank	Pool 1		Pool 2	
Rank	Team	Total	Team	Total
1	Spain	24.54	Italy	25.68
2	Turkey	24.46	France	24.06
3	Portugal	23.66	Montenegro	23.12
4	Hungary	23.06	Croatia	22.92

=== Finals ===
Final
Spain	25.54
Italy	26.44

Bronze medal
Turkey	24.76
Montenegro	22.62
Portugal	24.02
France	24.80
