= Karate at the 2025 World Games – Women's kata =

Women's kata at the 2025 World Games
- Venue: Jianyang Cultural and Sports Centre Gymnasium
- Location: Chengdu, China
- Dates: 8 August
- Competitors: 8 from 8 nations

Medalists
gold medal	Grace Lau	Hong Kong
silver medal	Maho Ono	Japan
bronze medal	Paola García	Spain

The women's kata competition in karate at the 2025 World Games took place on 8 August 2025 at the Jianyang Cultural and Sports Centre Gymnasium in Chengdu, China.

== Results ==
=== Pool round ===
==== Pool A ====
Pos	Athlete	B	W	L	PF	PA	(Japan)	(Iran)	(Italy)	(United States)
1	Maho Ono (JPN)	3	3	0	128.0	120.7	—	43.1	42.5	42.4
2	Fatemeh Sadeghi (IRI)	3	2	1	122.4	124.0	40.7	—	41.2	40.5
3	Terryana D'Onofrio (ITA)	3	1	2	122.6	123.5	40.1	40.9	—	41.6
4	Sakura Kokumai (USA)	3	0	3	119.7	124.5	39.9	40.0	39.8	—

Source: Chengdu 2025

==== Pool B ====
Pos	Athlete	B	W	L	PF	PA	(Hong Kong)	(Spain)	(China)	(Colombia)
1	Grace Lau (HKG)	3	3	0	127.9	120.3	—	42.9	42.1	42.9
2	Paola García (ESP)	3	2	1	122.4	122.0	41.0	—	41.2	40.2
3	Tao Yiwei (CHN)	3	1	2	119.3	122.1	39.2	40.1	—	40.0
4	Valentina Zapata (COL)	3	0	3	117.9	123.1	40.1	39.0	38.8	—

Source: Chengdu 2025

=== Finals ===
Semi-finals
Paola García (ESP)	40.8
Maho Ono (JPN)	42.7
Fatemeh Sadeghi (IRI)	41.9
Grace Lau (HKG)	44.9

Gold medal bout
Maho Ono (JPN)	43.6
Grace Lau (HKG)	45.3
Bronze medal bout
Paola García (ESP)	41.6
Fatemeh Sadeghi (IRI)	40.1
