= Azdin Rghioui =

French karateka

Azdin (or Azedin) Rghioui (born August 1987) and is a French karate (Kumite) champion.

== Biography ==
Azdin Rghioui was born in August 1987 in Nîmes, France.

In 2007, at the Junior World Championship, he won a silver medal in the junior individual category (under 65 kg).

At the 2012 World Karate Championships, he was part of the winning kumite team.

At the 2013 European Karate Championships, he became European champion.

He has initially influenced by martial art movies, particularly those with Jean-Claude Van Damme and Bruce Lee, before taking up karate with his brothers.

Azedin succeeded in his first selection in 2006 in the Junior Championship in İzmir (Turkey) with an offensive and varied karate . Trained in Nîmes by Hédi Bouri and Fabrice Fontaine at the Yamato Karate Club.

World conquest: forty years after a first and only visit to Paris, the world karate championship returned to the Paris-Bercy Sports Palace. The French finished first and won the World Male Team Championship beating Turkey in the final. Azdin helped immensely through his decisive victories in the quarter final against Egypt and semi final against Germany.
