= 2013 European Karate Championships =

Karate competition

- Venue: Ice Palace Budapest
- Location: Budapest, Hungary
- Dates: 9–12 May
- Competitors: 497 from 45 nations

The 2013 European Karate Championships, the 48th edition, were held in Budapest, Hungary from 9 to 12 May 2013. A total of 497 competitors from 45 countries participated at the event.

== Medal table ==
* Host nation (Hungary)

Rank	Nation	Gold	Silver	Bronze	Total
1	Turkey	4	2	3	9
2	France	4	2	1	7
3	Spain	3	0	1	4
4	Italy	1	4	3	8
5	Switzerland	1	0	3	4
6	Azerbaijan	1	0	0	1
6	Croatia	1	0	0	1
6	Ukraine	1	0	0	1
9	Germany	0	3	2	5
10	Greece	0	1	2	3
10	Serbia	0	1	2	3
12	Austria	0	1	0	1
12	Bosnia and Herzegovina	0	1	0	1
12	Netherlands	0	1	0	1
15	Hungary*	0	0	5	5
16	Belgium	0	0	1	1
16	England	0	0	1	1
16	Georgia	0	0	1	1
16	Latvia	0	0	1	1
16	Montenegro	0	0	1	1
16	North Macedonia	0	0	1	1
16	Portugal	0	0	1	1
16	Russia	0	0	1	1
16	Slovakia	0	0	1	1
16	Slovenia	0	0	1	1
Totals (25 entries)		16	16	32	64

== Medalists ==
=== Men's competition ===
==== Individual ====
Event	Gold	Silver	Bronze
Kata	(Spain) Damián Quintero	(France) Vu Duc Minh Dack	(Italy) Luca Valdesi (Turkey) Mehmet Yakan
Kumite –60 kg	(Turkey) Aykut Kaya	(Germany) Alexander Heimann	(Greece) Georgios Kostouros (Latvia) Kalvis Kalniņš
Kumite –67 kg	(France) William Rolle	(Turkey) Ömer Kemaloğlu	(Hungary) Ádám Kovács (Switzerland) Kujtim Bajrami
Kumite –75 kg	(Azerbaijan) Rafael Aghayev	(Netherlands) René Smaal	(Italy) Luigi Busà (Turkey) Serkan Yağcı
Kumite –84 kg	(France) Kenji Grillon	(Greece) Georgios Tzanos	(North Macedonia) Berat Jakupi (Georgia (country)) Gogita Arkania
Kumite +84 kg	(Turkey) Enes Erkan	(Italy) Stefano Maniscalco	(Germany) Jonathan Horne (Portugal) Nuno Manuel Dias

==== Team ====
Event	Gold	Silver	Bronze
Kata	Spain; José Carbonell; Damián Quintero; Francisco Salazar	Germany; Florian Genau; Philip Jüttner; Jan Urke	Russia; Maksim Ksenofontov; Aleksander Rusanov; Emil Skovorodnikov Turkey; Arslan Çalışkan; Orçun Duman; Metin Sofuoğlu
Kumite	France; Nadir Benaïssa; Salim Bendiab; Mathieu Cossou; Logan Da Costa; Ibrahim Gary; Kenji Grillon; Azdin Rghioui	Bosnia and Herzegovina; Oliver Mandarić; Meris Muhović; Edin Muslić; Haris Skrijelj; Haris Sujković; Suad Tabaković; Damir Zadro	Germany; Andreas Bachmann; Noah Bitsch; Mehmet Bolat; Oliver Henning; Jonathan Horne; Heinrich Leistenschneider; Nikoloz Tsurtsumia Slovenia; Sebastjan Budihna; Rem Marič; Juš Markač; Matija Matijević; Mladen Railić; Danijel Rihtarič; Filip Španbauer

=== Women's competition ===
==== Individual ====
Event	Gold	Silver	Bronze
Kata	(Spain) Yaiza Martín	(Italy) Viviana Bottaro	(France) Sandy Scordo (Serbia) Marija Madžarević
Kumite –50 kg	(France) Alexandra Recchia	(Turkey) Serap Özçelik	(Greece) Evdoxia Kosmidou (Italy) Selene Guglielmi
Kumite –55 kg	(Turkey) Tuba Yenen	(Italy) Sara Cardin	(Hungary) Beatrix Tóth (Slovakia) Jana Vojtikevičová
Kumite –61 kg	(Ukraine) Anita Serogina	(Serbia) Sanja Cvrkota	(England) Natalie Williams (Turkey) Bahar Erşeker
Kumite –68 kg	(Turkey) Hafsa Şeyda Burucu	(Austria) Alisa Buchinger	(Hungary) Sandra Metzger (Montenegro) Marina Raković
Kumite +68 kg	(Switzerland) Jesica Cargill	(Italy) Greta Vitelli	(Belgium) Laura Pradelli (Hungary) Nikola Bartha

==== Team ====
Event	Gold	Silver	Bronze
Kata	Italy; Sara Battaglia; Viviana Bottaro; Michela Pezzetti	Germany; Jasmine Bleu; Christine Heinrich; Sophie Wachter	Serbia; Milana Jakšić; Ivana Stepanović; Dunja Žeravić Spain; Sonia García; Yaiza Martín; Margarita Morata
Kumite	Croatia; Ana-Marija Bujas Čelan; Ana Lenard; Azra Saleš; Ivona Tubić	France; Nadège Ait-Ibrahim; Lucie Ignace; Alexandra Recchia; Emily Thouy	Hungary; Nikola Bartha; Nikolett Juhász; Fruzsina Lassingleitner; Sandra Metzger Switzerland; Jessica Cargill; Fanny Clavien; Noémie Kornfeld

== Participating countries ==
- Albania (14)
- Andorra (11)
- Armenia (2)
- Austria (13)
- Azerbaijan (13)
- Belarus (6)
- Belgium (13)
- Bosnia and Herzegovina (11)
- Bulgaria (1)
- Croatia (25)
- Cyprus (4)
- Czech Republic (6)
- Denmark (5)
- England (22)
- Finland (7)
- France (26)
- Georgia (4)
- Germany (20)
- Greece (12)
- Hungary (22)
- Iceland (6)
- Ireland (7)
- Israel (8)
- Italy (15)
- Latvia (7)
- Luxembourg (5)
- Macedonia (17)
- Moldova (1)
- Montenegro (18)
- Netherlands (9)
- Norway (5)
- Poland (11)
- Portugal (19)
- Romania (15)
- Russia (19)
- Scotland (3)
- Serbia (21)
- Slovakia (13)
- Slovenia (14)
- Spain (20)
- Sweden (5)
- Switzerland (3)
- Turkey (25)
- Ukraine (13)
- Wales (3)
