= 2023 European Karate Championships – Women's team kata =

European Karate Championship

Women's team kata at the 2023 European Karate Championships
- Venue: Palacio Multiusos de Guadalajara
- Location: Guadalajara, Spain
- Dates: 23, 26 March
- Nations: 10
- Teams: 10

Medalists
gold medal	Carola Casale; Terryana D'Onofrio; Noemi Nicosanti	Italy
silver medal	María López; Lidia Rodríguez; Raquel Roy	Spain
bronze medal	Maï-Linh Bui; Romane Leitao; Helvétia Taily	France
bronze medal	Şule Azra Akbulut; Zehra Kaya; Damla Pelit; Damla Su Türemen	Turkey

The Women's team kata competition at the 2023 European Karate Championships was held from 23 and 26 March 2023.

== Results ==
=== Round 1 ===
Rank	Pool 1		Pool 2	
Rank	Team	Total	Team	Total
1	Spain	41.0	Italy	41.3
2	France	39.7	Turkey	40.2
3	Portugal	39.1	Austria	38.6
4	Montenegro	36.5	Hungary	37.1
5	Croatia	36.3	Finland	33.5

=== Finals ===
Final
Spain	43.3
Italy	45.6

Bronze medal
France	41.3
Austria	37.2
Portugal	41.4
Turkey	43.3
