= Paola García (karateka) =

Spanish karateka (born 2006)

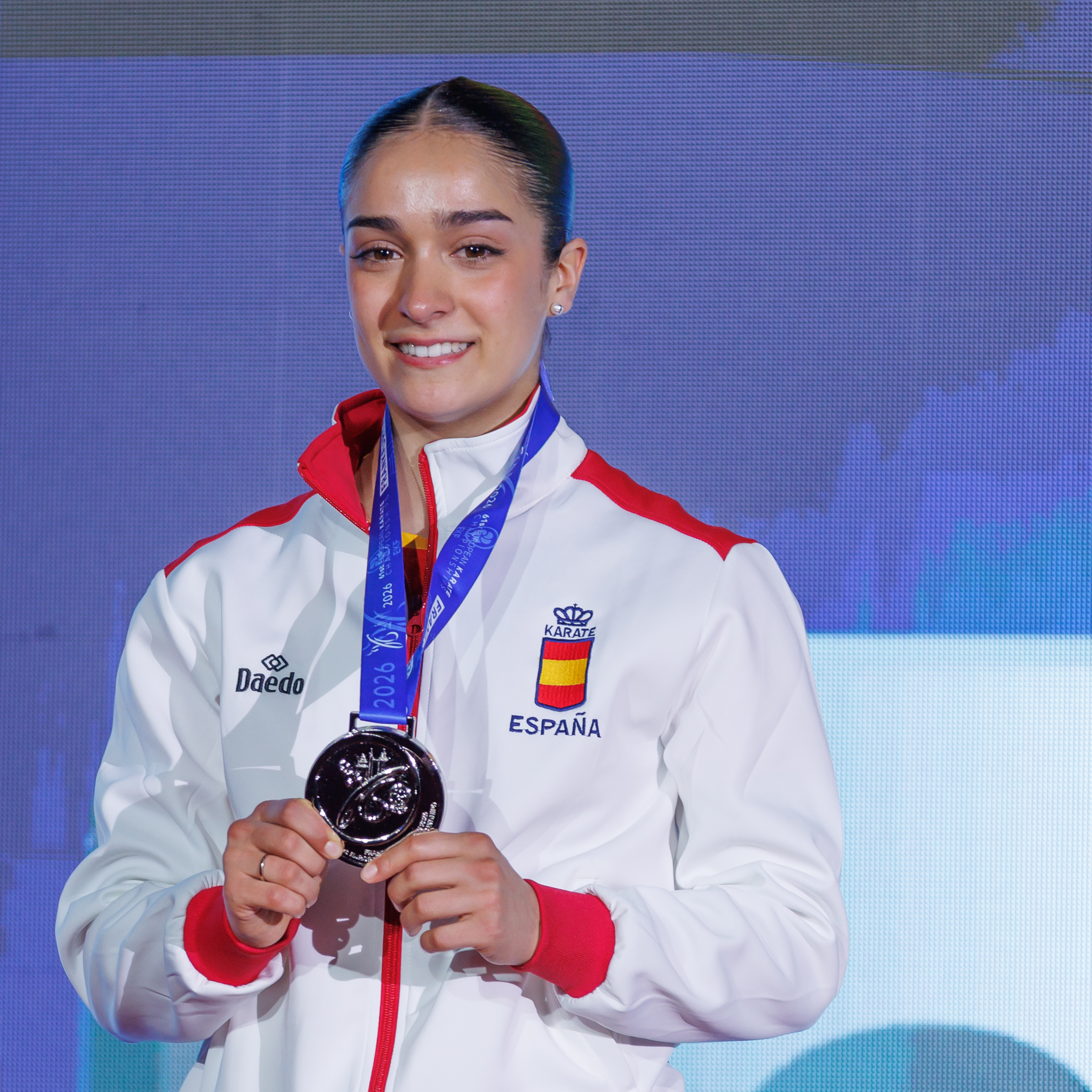

Personal information
- Full name: Paola García Lozano
- Born: 22 February 2006 (age 20)

Sport
- Country: Spain
- Sport: Karate
- Events: Individual kata; Team kata
Medal record
Women's karate
Representing Spain
World Games
Bronze medal – third place	2025 Chengdu	Individual kata
World Championships
Bronze medal – third place	2023 Budapest	Individual kata
Bronze medal – third place	2023 Budapest	Team kata
European Games
Gold medal – first place	2023 Kraków-Małopolska	Individual kata
European Championships
Gold medal – first place	2023 Guadalajara	Individual kata
Gold medal – first place	2025 Yerevan	Team kata
Silver medal – second place	2026 Frankfurt	Individual kata
Bronze medal – third place	2024 Zadar	Individual kata
Bronze medal – third place	2025 Yerevan	Individual kata
Bronze medal – third place	2026 Frankfurt	Team kata
World U21 Championships
Silver medal – second place	2024 Venice	Individual kata

Paola García Lozano (born 22 February 2006) is a Spanish karateka. She won the gold medal in the women's individual kata event at the 2023 European Games held in Poland. She also won the gold medal in her event at the 2023 European Karate Championships held in Guadalajara, Spain.

== Career ==
=== Youth-level career ===
Before stepping up to senior level, García was runner-up in the individual kata at the 2022 World Junior Championships and won the European Junior title in February 2023, defending the title she had taken the previous year. She later won silver at the 2024 World U21 Championship in Venice.

=== Senior career ===
In October 2023, García won one of the bronze medals in the women's individual kata event at the World Karate Championships held in Budapest, Hungary. She defeated Sakura Kokumai of the United States in her bronze medal match. García also won one of the bronze medals in the women's team kata event.

García won one of the bronze medals in the women's individual kata event at the 2024 European Karate Championships held in Zadar, Croatia. She won the bronze medal in the women's kata event at the 2025 World Games held in Chengdu, China.

At the 2026 European Karate Championships held in Frankfurt Germany, García won the silver medal in the women´s individual kata event, losing the final 4-3 to Terryana D'Onofrio of Italy, and a bronze medal in the women´s team kata event.

== Achievements on senior level ==
Year	Competition	Location	Rank	Event
2023	European Championships	Guadalajara, Spain	1st	Individual kata
2023	European Games	Kraków and Małopolska, Poland	1st	Individual kata
2023	World Championships	Budapest, Hungary	3rd	Individual kata
2023	World Championships	Budapest, Hungary	3rd	Team kata
2024	European Championships	Zadar, Croatia	3rd	Individual kata
2025	European Championships	Yerevan, Armenia	3rd	Individual kata
2025	European Championships	Yerevan, Armenia	1st	Team kata
2025	World Games	Chengdu, China	3rd	Individual kata
2026	European Championships	Frankfurt, Germany	2nd	Individual kata
2026	European Championships	Frankfurt, Germany	3rd	Team kata
