= 2026 European Karate Championships – Women's team kata =

Women's team kata at the 2026 European Karate Championships
- Venue: Eissporthalle Frankfurt
- Location: Frankfurt, Germany
- Dates: 21, 24 May
- Nations: 12
- Teams: 12

Medalists
gold medal	Carola Casale; Orsola D'Onofrio; Michela Rizzo; Elena Roversi	Italy
silver medal	Ana Sofia Cruz; Natacha Fernandes; Inês Oliveira; Beatriz Portal	Portugal
bronze medal	Maï-Linh Bui; Louise Capet; Léa Severan; Julia Vilanova	France
bronze medal	Abril Angulo; Paola García; Carla Guardeño; Irene Yao	Spain

The women's team kata competition at the 2026 European Karate Championships was held on 21 and 24 May 2026.

== Results ==
=== Bracket ===
Round of 16
Czech Republic	7
North Macedonia	0
Germany	7
Croatia	0
Malta	1
Montenegro	6
EKF-1	0
Turkey	7

Quarterfinals
Czech Republic	0
France	7
Germany	1
Portugal	6
Montenegro	0
Italy	7
Turkey	1
Spain	6

Semifinals
France	0
Portugal	7
Italy	5
Spain	2

Final
Portugal	0
Italy	7

=== Repechage ===
Bronze medal
Germany	3
France	4

Bronze medal
Montenegro	0
Spain	7
