= 2025 European Karate Championships – Women's team kata =

European Karate Championship

Women's team kata at the 2025 European Karate Championships
- Venue: Karen Demirchyan Complex
- Location: Yerevan, Armenia
- Dates: 7, 11 May
- Competitors: 36 from 12 nations

Medalists
gold medal	Paola García; Carla Guardeño; Irene Carrión; Sara Tabuenca	Spain
silver medal	Ana Sofia Cruz; Natacha Fernandes; Maisa Caridade; Beatriz Portal	Portugal
bronze medal	Terryana D'Onofrio; Michela Rizzo; Elena Roversi; Orsola D'Onofrio	Italy
bronze medal	Maï-Linh Bui; Marie Bui; Léa Severan	France

The women's team kata competition at the 2025 European Karate Championships was held on 7 and 11 May 2025.

== Results ==
Round of 16
Germany	39.00
Switzerland	37.30
Croatia	37.00
Portugal	40.00
Czech Republic	38.70
Bosnia and Herzegovina	35.30
Montenegro	36.60
North Macedonia	34.40

Quarterfinals
Germany	38.60
Turkey	39.80
Portugal	40.40
Italy	38.90
Czech Republic	39.50
France	40.50
Montenegro	35.60
Spain	39.70

Semifinals
Turkey	39.90
Portugal	40.70
France	38.80
Spain	40.10

Final
Portugal	42.20
Spain	43.40

=== Repechage ===
Repechage round 1
Croatia	36.90
Italy	39.10

Bronze medal match
Turkey	40.20
Italy	41.80
Montenegro	38.00
France	40.80
