= 2023 World Karate Championships – Women's team kata =

Women's team kata at the 2023 World Karate Championships
- Venue: László Papp Budapest Sports Arena
- Location: Budapest, Hungary
- Dates: 26, 29 October
- Nations: 21
- Teams: 21

Medalists
gold medal	Saori Ishibashi; Chiho Mizukami; Sae Taira	Japan
silver medal	Terryana D'Onofrio; Michela Rizzo; Elena Roversi	Italy
bronze medal	Paola García; María López; Gema Morales; Raquel Roy	Spain
bronze medal	Asmaa Allam; Noha Amr Antar; Aya Hesham	Egypt

The women's team kata competition at the 2023 World Karate Championships was held on 26 and 29 October 2023.

== Results ==
=== Round 1 ===
Rank	Pool 1		Pool 2	
Rank	Team	Total	Team	Total
1	Italy	41.6	Japan	42.9
2	Spain	41.6	Egypt	40.7
3	Portugal	40.0	Morocco	39.7
4	Turkey	39.7	Germany	39.0
5	France	38.8	Hong Kong	39.0
6	Australia	37.8	Peru	38.7
7	Colombia	36.9	Hungary	38.6
8	Brazil	36.9	Malaysia	37.5
9	Croatia	36.5	Switzerland	36.0
10	Czech Republic	35.3	South Africa	33.7
11	Bosnia and Herzegovina	32.5		

=== Round 2 ===
Rank	Pool 1		Pool 2	
Rank	Team	Total	Team	Total
1	Italy	42.9	Japan	43.3
2	Spain	42.0	Egypt	41.3
3	Turkey	41.0	Morocco	41.3
4	Portugal	40.2	Germany	39.2

=== Finals ===
Final
Italy	44.3
Japan	47.1

Bronze medal
Spain	44.8
Morocco	44.0
Turkey	43.1
Egypt	44.0
