= Damla Su Türemen =

Turkish karateka (born 2004)

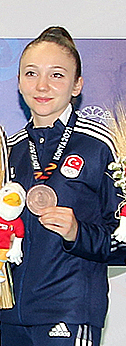
- Damla Su Türemen (2022)
- Born: 2004 (age 21–22); Denizli, Turkey
- Nationality: Turkish
- Team: Denizli Büyükşehir Belediyespor

Damla Su Türemen (born 2004) is a Turkish karateka competing in the kata category.

== Personal life ==
Türemen was born in 2004. She is a native of Denizli, Turkey.

== Sports career ==
=== Early years ===
Türemen started her sports career at the age of eleven in 2015. She won several medals in the individual kata of her age groups category, and became the Turkish champion in 2021. In 2015, she debuted internationally at the 20th Balkan Championships for Children held in Herceg Novi, Montenegro, and won the silver medal in the individual kataevenet of U11. She took bronze medals in the individual kata and the team kata events with her teammates at the 47th EKF Junior & Cadet and U21 Championships held in Budapest, Hungary in 2020. In 2021, she captured the gold medal in the Juniors individual kata event at the EKF Junior, Cadet & U21 Championships in Tampere, Finland.

She is a member of the Denizli Büyükşehir Belediyespor Club.

=== Senior career ===
Türemen won the silver medal in the individual kata event and shared the gold medal with her teammates in the senior team kata event at the 2021 Balkan Championships Children, Seniors, Veterans in Poreč, Croatia. She competed in the individual kata event at the 2021 World Karate Championships in Dubai, United Arab Emirates losing in the Round 3. She shared the bronze medal with her teammates in the team kata event at the 2021 Islamic Solidarity Games in Konya, Turkey. In 022, she won the bronze medal in the team kata event of the 2022 European Karate Championships in Gaziantep, Turkey. She won the bronze medal in the team kata event at the 2023 European Karate Championships in Guadalajara, Spain.

She won one of the bronze medals in the women's team kata event at the 2024 European Karate Championships held in Zadar, Croatia.
