= Zehra Kaya =

Turkish karateka (born 2004)

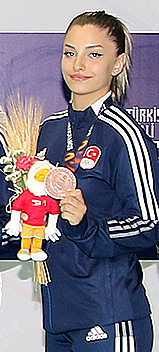
- Zehra Kaya (2022)
- Born: 28 November 2004 (age 21); Gaziosmanpaşa, İzmir, Turkey
- Nationality: Turkish
- Team: Gaziosmanpaşa Belediyespor

Zehra Kaya (born 28 November 2004) is a Turkish karateka competing in the kata category.

== Personal life ==
Zehra Kaya was born in 2004. She is a native of Gaziosmanpaşa in Istanbul Province, Turkey.

== Sports career ==
=== Early years ===
Kaya is a member of her hometown club Gaziosmanpaşa Belediyespor. She won various medals in the team kata category at domestic tournaments.

=== Senior career ===
She shared the bronze medal with her teammates in the team kata event at the 2021 Islamic Solidarity Games in Konya, Turkey. In 2022, she took the bronze medal in the team kata event of the 27th European Karate Championships in Gaziantep, Turkey. She took the bronze medal in the team kata event at the 2023 European Karate Championships in Guadalajara, Spain.

She won one of the bronze medals in the women's team kata event at the 2024 European Karate Championships held in Zadar, Croatia.
