= Helvétia Taily =

French karateka (born 1999)

Personal information
- Born: 11 April 1999 (age 27)

Sport
- Country: France
- Sport: Karate
- Events: Individual kata; Team kata
Medal record
Women's karate
Representing France
European Championships
Silver medal – second place	2023 Guadalajara	Individual kata
Silver medal – second place	2025 Yerevan	Individual kata
Bronze medal – third place	2023 Guadalajara	Team kata
European Games
Silver medal – second place	2023 Kraków-Małopolska	Individual kata

Helvétia Taily (born 11 April 1999) is a French karateka. She won the silver medal in the women's individual kata event at the 2023 European Games held in Poland. She also won the silver medal in her event at the 2023 European Karate Championships held in Guadalajara, Spain.

In 2021, Taily competed in the women's individual kata event at the World Karate Championships held in Dubai, United Arab Emirates. She also competed in the women's individual kata event at the 2023 World Karate Championships held in Budapest, Hungary.

She competed in the women's individual kata event at the 2024 European Karate Championships held in Zadar, Croatia.

== Achievements ==
Year	Competition	Location	Rank	Event
2023	European Championships	Guadalajara, Spain	2nd	Individual kata
2023	European Championships	Guadalajara, Spain	3rd	Team kata
2023	European Games	Kraków and Małopolska, Poland	2nd	Individual kata
2025	European Championships	Yerevan, Armenia	2nd	Individual kata
