= Aykut Kaya (karateka) =

Turkish karateka (born 1990)

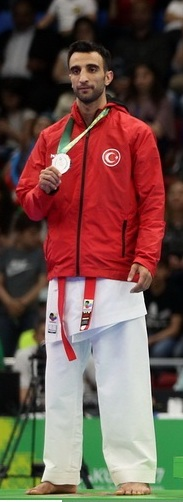
- Born: June 15, 1990 (age 36); Istanbul, Turkey
- Nationality: Turkish
- Division: -60 kg
- Style: Karate Kumite
- Team: İstanbul B.B. SK

Other information
- University: Sakarya University

Aykut Kaya
Medal record

Men's Karate

European Championships
Gold medal – first place	2013 Budapest	Kumite -60 kg
Bronze medal – third place	2011 Zurich	Kumite -60 kg

Aykut Kaya (born June 15, 1990) is a European champion Turkish karateka competing in the kumite -60 kg division. He is a member of the İstanbul B.B. SK. He is a student at Sakarya University.

Kaya became champion at the 2013 European Championships held on May 9–12 in Budapest, Hungary.

== Achievements ==
2013

- Gold 48th European Championships - May 9, Budapest, HUN - kumite -60 kg

2012

- Bronze 16th Balkan Children & Seniors Karate Championships - March 16, Herceg Novi, MNE - kumite -60 kg

2011

- Bronze 3rd Under 21 European Cup - February 11, Novi Sad, SRB - kumite junior -68 kg
- Bronze 46th European Championships - May 6, Zurich, SUI - kumite -60 kg

2008

- Gold 35th European Junior & Cadet Karate Championships - February 15, Trieste, ITA - kumite cadet -60 kg

2007

- Gold 34th European Junior & Cadet Karate Championships - February 9, İzmir, TUR - kumite cadet -60 kg
