= Carola Casale =

Italian karateka (born 1998)

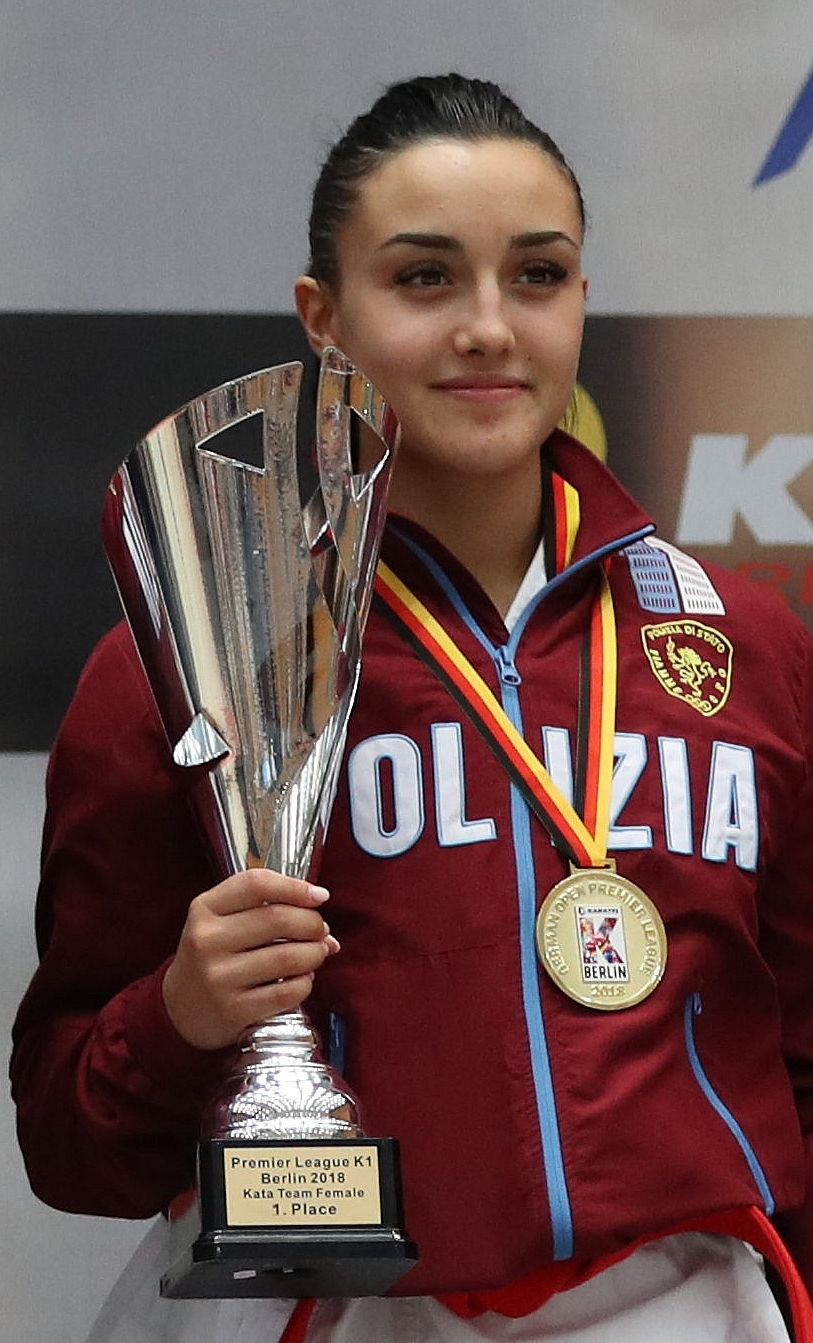

Personal information
- Nationality: Italian
- Born: 7 November 1998 (age 27) Genoa, Italy

Sport
- Sport: Karate
- Club: Fiamme Oro (2017–2021); Esercito Italiano (2017–2021)
Medal record
Event	1st	2nd	3rd
World Championships	0	0	1
European Championships	4	1	0
World U21 Championships	0	1	0
European U21 Championships	1	0	0
Total	5	2	1
World Championships
Bronze medal – third place	2021 Dubai	Team kata
European Championships
Gold medal – first place	2021 Poreč	Team kata
Gold medal – first place	2022 Gaziantep	Team kata
Gold medal – first place	2023 Guadalajara	Team kata
Gold medal – first place	2026 Frankfurt	Team kata
Silver medal – second place	2019 Guadalajara	Team kata

Carola Casale (born 7 November 1998) is an Italian karateka. She is a three-time European champion in the women's team kata event at the European Karate Championships. She won one of the bronze medals in the women's team kata event at the 2021 World Karate Championships held in Dubai, United Arab Emirates.

She lost her bronze medal match in the women's kata event at the 2022 World Games held in Birmingham, United States.
