= Sandy Scordo =

French karateka (born 1985)

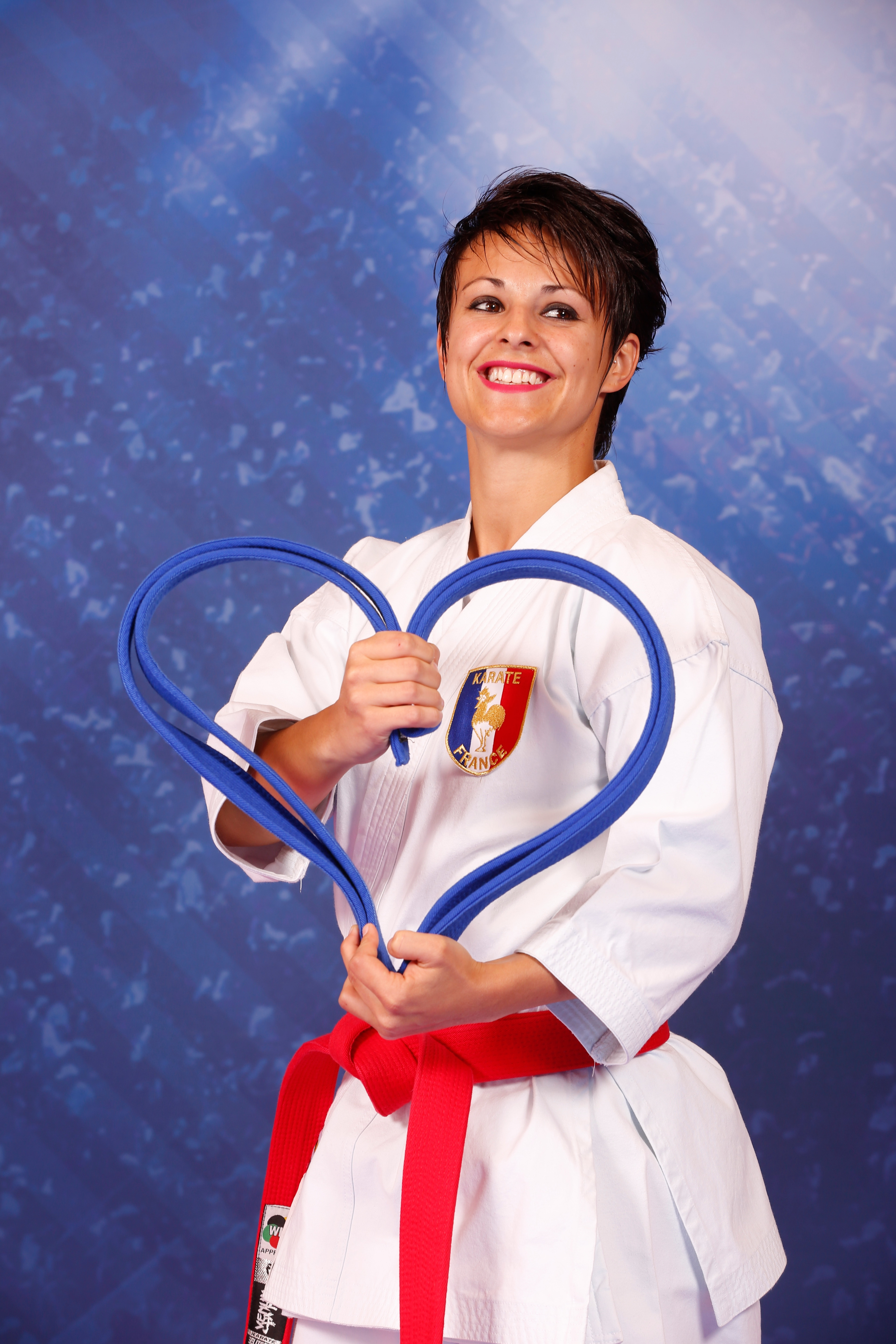

Personal information
- Born: 25 July 1985 (age 40)

Sport
- Country: France
- Sport: Karate
- Events: Individual kata; Team kata
Medal record
Women's karate
Representing France
World Championships
Silver medal – second place	2012 Paris	Individual kata
Silver medal – second place	2014 Bremen	Individual kata
European Championships
Silver medal – second place	2010 Athens	Individual kata
Silver medal – second place	2011 Zürich	Individual kata
Silver medal – second place	2012 Adeje	Individual kata
Silver medal – second place	2016 Montpellier	Individual kata
Silver medal – second place	2017 İzmit	Team kata
Bronze medal – third place	2009 Zagreb	Individual kata
Bronze medal – third place	2013 Budapest	Individual kata
Bronze medal – third place	2014 Tampere	Individual kata
Bronze medal – third place	2017 İzmit	Individual kata
European Games
Silver medal – second place	2015 Baku	Individual kata
World Games
Gold medal – first place	2013 Cali	Individual kata
Bronze medal – third place	2017 Wrocław	Individual kata
World Combat Games
Gold medal – first place	2013 Saint Petersburg	Individual kata

Sandy Scordo (born 25 July 1985) is a French karateka. She is a two-time silver medallist at the World Karate Championships in the women's individual kata event, both in 2012 and in 2014.

== Career ==
Scordo won one of the bronze medals in the women's kata event at the 2009 European Karate Championships held in Zagreb, Croatia. She won the silver medal in this event at the European Karate Championships in 2010, 2011 and 2012. Scordo won one of the bronze medals in this event in 2013 and 2014.

At the 2013 World Games held in Cali, Colombia, Scordo won the gold medal in the women's kata event. In the same year, she also won the gold medal in the women's kata event at the 2013 World Combat Games held in Saint Petersburg, Russia.

In 2015, Scordo won the silver medal in the women's kata event at the European Games held in Baku, Azerbaijan. In the final, she lost against Sandra Sánchez of Spain.

In 2017, Scordo won the bronze medal in the women's kata event at the World Games held in Wrocław, Poland. In the bronze medal match, she defeated Sakura Kokumai of the United States.

== Achievements ==
Year	Competition	Venue	Rank	Event
2009	European Championships	Zagreb, Croatia	3rd	Individual kata
2010	European Championships	Athens, Greece	2nd	Individual kata
2011	European Championships	Zürich, Switzerland	2nd	Individual kata
2012	European Championships	Adeje, Spain	2nd	Individual kata
2012	World Championships	Paris, France	2nd	Individual kata
2013	European Championships	Budapest, Hungary	3rd	Individual kata
2013	World Games	Cali, Colombia	1st	Individual kata
2014	European Championships	Tampere, Finland	3rd	Individual kata
2014	World Championships	Bremen, Germany	2nd	Individual kata
2015	European Games	Baku, Azerbaijan	2nd	Individual kata
2016	European Championships	Montpellier, France	2nd	Individual kata
2017	European Championships	İzmit, Turkey	3rd	Individual kata
2017	European Championships	İzmit, Turkey	2nd	Team kata
2017	World Games	Wrocław, Poland	3rd	Individual kata
