= Sandra Sánchez =

Spanish karateka (born 1981)

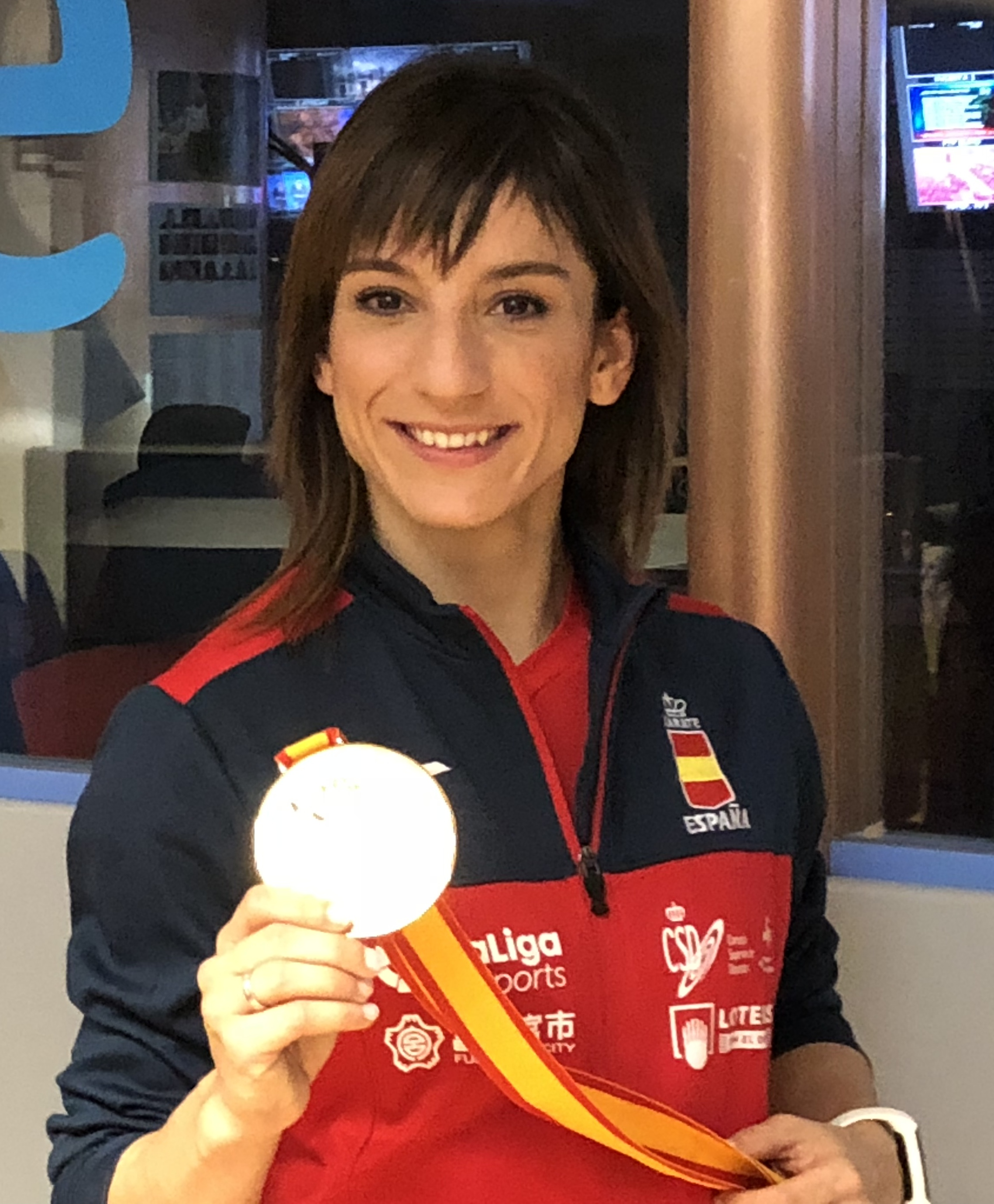
- Sánchez in 2018

Personal information
- Full name: Sandra Sánchez Jaime
- Born: 16 September 1981 (age 44) Talavera de la Reina, Spain

Sport
- Country: Spain
- Sport: Karate
- Event: Individual kata
- Coached by: Jesús Del Moral
Medal record
Women's karate
Representing Spain
Summer Olympics
Gold medal – first place	2020 Tokyo	Individual kata
World Championships
Gold medal – first place	2018 Madrid	Individual kata
Gold medal – first place	2021 Dubai	Individual kata
Bronze medal – third place	2016 Linz	Individual kata
European Championships
Gold medal – first place	2015 Istanbul	Individual kata
Gold medal – first place	2016 Montpellier	Individual kata
Gold medal – first place	2017 Kocaeli	Individual kata
Gold medal – first place	2018 Novi Sad	Individual kata
Gold medal – first place	2019 Guadalajara	Individual kata
Gold medal – first place	2021 Poreč	Individual kata
Gold medal – first place	2022 Gaziantep	Individual kata
European Games
Gold medal – first place	2015 Baku	Individual kata
Gold medal – first place	2019 Minsk	Individual kata
World Beach Games
Gold medal – first place	2019 Doha	Individual kata
World Games
Gold medal – first place	2022 Birmingham	Individual kata
Silver medal – second place	2017 Wrocław	Individual kata

Sandra Sánchez Jaime (born 16 September 1981) is a retired Spanish karateka. She won the gold medal in the women's kata event at the 2020 Summer Olympics in Tokyo, Japan. She is a two-time gold medallist in the women's individual kata event at the World Karate Championships (2018 and 2021). She also won the gold medal in this event at the European Karate Championships in seven consecutive competitions (2015 – 2022). She is also recognised by Guinness World Records for winning the most medals in the Karate1 Premier League; she won 35 consecutive medals between January 2014 and February 2020.

== Career ==
In 2015, Sánchez won the gold medal in the women's kata event at the European Karate Championships held in Istanbul, Turkey. In the same year, she also won the gold medal in the women's kata event at the European Games held in Baku, Azerbaijan. In the final, she defeated Sandy Scordo of France.

At the 2016 World Karate Championships held in Linz, Austria, she won one of the bronze medals in the women's individual kata event. In 2017, she won the silver medal in the women's kata event at the World Games held in Wrocław, Poland. In the final, she lost against Kiyou Shimizu of Japan.

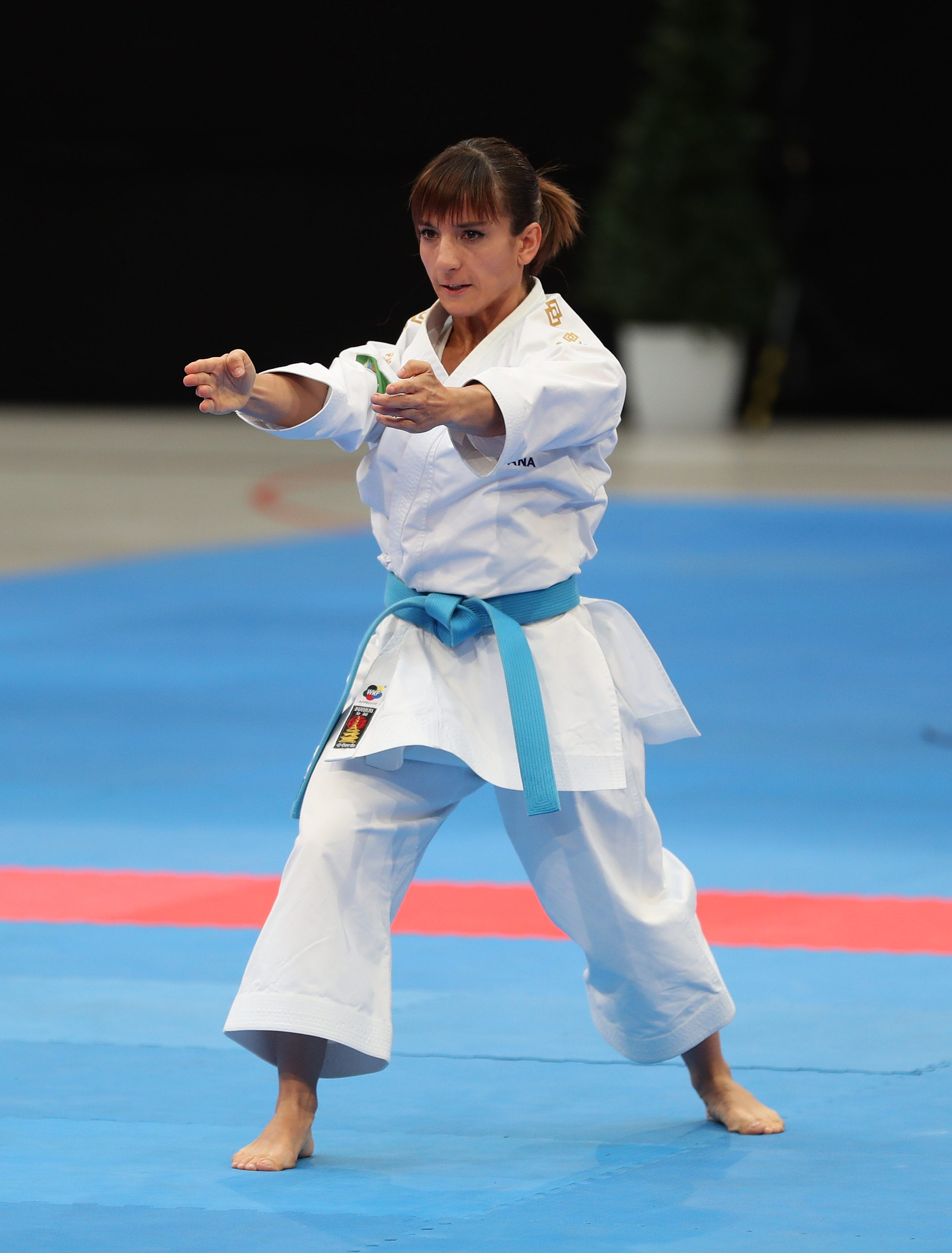
Sánchez in 2018

In 2018, Sánchez won the gold medal in her event at both the European Karate Championships held in Novi Sad, Serbia and the World Karate Championships held in Madrid, Spain.

Sánchez won the gold medal in the women's kata event at the 2019 European Karate Championships held in Guadalajara, Spain. In the same year, she also represented Spain at the European Games in Minsk, Belarus and she won the gold medal in the women's individual kata event. Lastly, she also won the gold medal in the women's individual kata event at the 2019 World Beach Games held in Doha, Qatar.

In May 2021, Sánchez secured the gold medal in her event at the European Karate Championships held in Poreč, Croatia. She also represented Spain at the 2020 Summer Olympics in Tokyo, Japan. She won the gold medal in the women's kata event. In November 2021, she won the gold medal in the women's kata event at the World Karate Championships held in Dubai, United Arab Emirates.

Sánchez won the gold medal in the women's individual kata event at the 2022 European Karate Championships held in Gaziantep, Turkey. She also won the gold medal in her event at the 2022 World Games held in Birmingham, United States.

She retired from competitive sports after the 2022 World Games.

In September 2022, a book series called Kat Karateka, written by Inés Masip and illustrated by Juan Carlos Bonache was released, inspired by Sandra Sánchez's career.

== Achievements ==
Year	Competition	Venue	Rank	Event
2015	European Championships	Istanbul, Turkey	1st	Individual kata
2015	European Games	Baku, Azerbaijan	1st	Individual kata
2016	European Championships	Montpellier, France	1st	Individual kata
2016	World Championships	Linz, Austria	3rd	Individual kata
2017	European Championships	Kocaeli, Turkey	1st	Individual kata
2017	World Games	Wrocław, Poland	2nd	Individual kata
2018	European Championships	Novi Sad, Serbia	1st	Individual kata
2018	World Championships	Madrid, Spain	1st	Individual kata
2019	European Championships	Guadalajara, Spain	1st	Individual kata
2019	European Games	Minsk, Belarus	1st	Individual kata
2019	World Beach Games	Doha, Qatar	1st	Individual kata
2021	European Championships	Poreč, Croatia	1st	Individual kata
2021	Summer Olympics	Tokyo, Japan	1st	Individual kata
2021	World Championships	Dubai, United Arab Emirates	1st	Individual kata
2022	European Championships	Gaziantep, Turkey	1st	Individual kata
2022	World Games	Birmingham, United States	1st	Individual kata
