= Michela Pezzetti =

Italian karateka (born 1991)

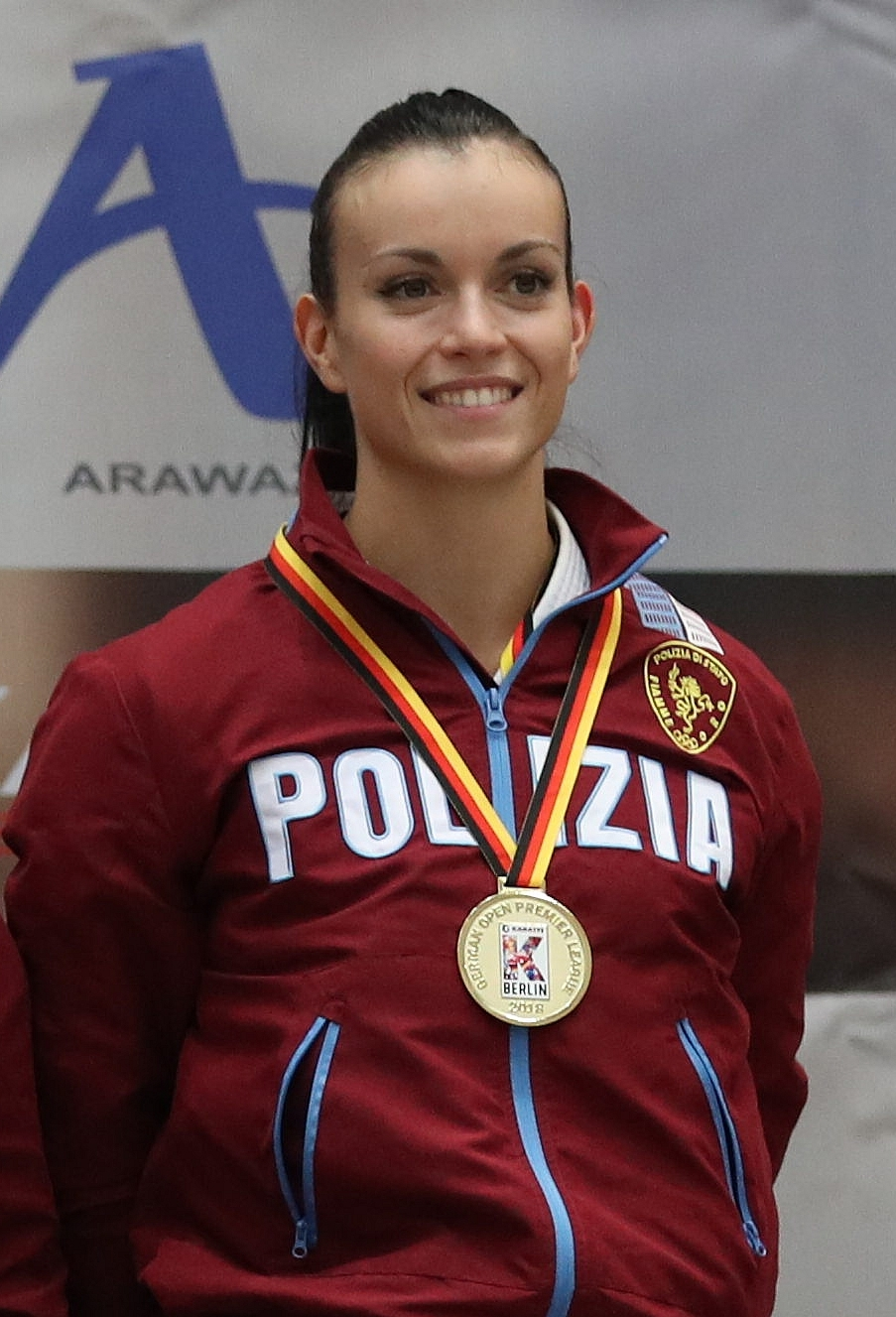

Personal information
- Nationality: Italian
- Born: 17 May 1991 (age 35) Perugia, Italy

Sport
- Sport: Karate
- Club: Fiamme Oro
Medal record
Women's karate
Representing Italy
Event	1st	2nd	3rd
World Championships	0	1	5
European Championships	4	4	3
Total	4	5	8
World Championships
Silver medal – second place	2012 Paris	Team kata
Bronze medal – third place	2010 Belgrade	Team kata
Bronze medal – third place	2014 Bremen	Team kata
Bronze medal – third place	2016 Linz	Team kata
Bronze medal – third place	2018 Madrid	Team kata
Bronze medal – third place	2021 Dubai	Team kata
European Championships
Gold medal – first place	2013 Budapest	Team kata
Gold medal – first place	2017 İzmit	Team kata
Gold medal – first place	2018 Novi Sad	Team kata
Gold medal – first place	2021 Poreč	Team kata
Gold medal – first place	2022 Gaziantep	Team kata
Silver medal – second place	2010 Athens	Team kata
Silver medal – second place	2011 Zürich	Team kata
Silver medal – second place	2014 Tampere	Team kata
Silver medal – second place	2019 Guadalajara	Team kata
Bronze medal – third place	2012 Adeje	Team kata
Bronze medal – third place	2015 Isatanbul	Team kata
Bronze medal – third place	2016 Montpellier	Team kata

Michela Pezzetti (born 27 January 1991) is an Italian karateka, five times European champion at senior level at the European Karate Championships.
