= Oya Ekici =

Turkish para-karateka (born 1975)

- Born: 1975 (age 50–51); Ankara, Turkey
- Team: Katana Sports Club

Oya Ekici (born 1975) is a Turkish para-karateka, who competes in the kata K-30 disability class at international level. She started her sports career at the age of 43, and became her country's one of the first two female para-karatekas.

== Personal life ==
Oya Ekici was born in 1975. At the age of two, she contracted polio. Her right leg knee joint remained blocked. She underwent 21 surgeries in total. She relies on crutches to get around.

She is a mother of two children. She has been working as a biologist at the Hacettepe University Hospital in Ankara since 2007.

== Sports career ==
=== Early years ===
Ekici started performing para-karate at the age of 44 in 2019, encouraged by her karateka daughter, who had been performing since six years at that time. In 2020, she performed para-karate with sticks trained by her coach. She is a member of Katana Sports Club in Ankara and performs para-karate training twice a week coached by Turgay Okumuş. At the opening of the 2021 Turkish Seniors and Veterans Karate Championship in Adana, she performed a kata show with crutches. She competes in the kata K-30 category. K-30 is the physical disability classification of the kata event for the wheelchair para-karateka with impairment in the legs.

The first national para-karate championship in Turkey was held at Kocaeli in December 2022. She competed there, and became runner-up after Nesrin Cavadzade. She became so Turkey's one of the first two para-karatekas.

In February 2023, she performed a para-kata show with her teammate at the Rehabilitation and Physical Therapy Hospital in Ankara to motivate the physically disabled military personnel for para-karate.

=== International career ===
Ekici is a member of the national team. She competed in the kata K-30 event at the 2022 European Karate Championships held in Gaziantep, Turkey, and won the bronze medal for the first time in the national team's history.
