= Damla Pelit =

Turkish karateka (born 2001)

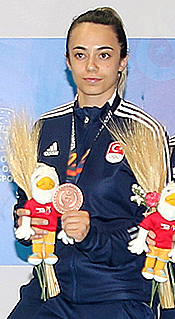
- Damla Pelit (2022)
- Born: 2001 (age 24–25); Ödemiş, İzmir, Turkey
- Nationality: Turkish
- Team: Denizli Büyükşehir Belediyespor

Damla Pelit (born 2001) is a Turkish karateka competing in the kata category.

== Personal life ==
Damla Pelit was born in 2001. She is a native of Ödemiş in İzmir Province, Turkey.

She is a student of Physical therapy and Rehabilitation at the Health Sciences Faculty of Lokman Hekim University in Ankara.

== Sports career ==
=== Early years ===
Pelit started her sports career at the age of ten in 2011. She won several medals in the individual kata event of her age groups at domestic tournaments. She debuted internationally at the 28th International Bosphorus Open Tournament in Istanbul, Turkey, and took the bronze medal in the cadet individual kata event. In 2015, she took the bronze medal in the individual kata event of U-14 category at the 20th Balkan Championships for Children held in Herceg Novi, Montenegro.

=== Senior career ===
Pelit shared the gold medal with her teammates in the senior team kata event at the 2021 Balkan Championships Children, Seniors, Veterans in Poreč, Croatia. She shared the bronze medal with her teammates in the team kata event at the 2021 Islamic Solidarity Games in Konya, Turkey. In 2022, she became a bronze medalist in the team kata event of the 27th European Karate Championships in Gaziantep, Turkey. She took the bronze medal in the team kata event at the 2023 European Karate Championships in Guadalajara, Spain.

She won one of the bronze medals in the women's team kata event at the 2024 European Karate Championships held in Zadar, Croatia.
