= Alexandra Feracci =

French karate practitioner (born 1992)

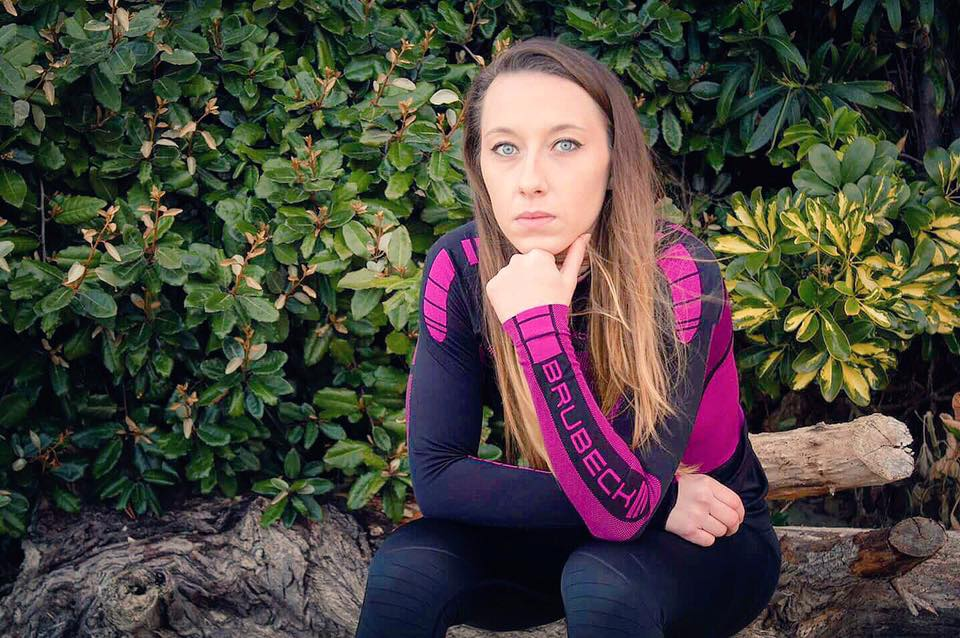

Personal information
- Born: 10 October 1992 (age 34) Ajaccio, Corse-du-Sud, France

Sport
- Country: France
- Sport: Karate
- Events: Individual kata; Team kata
Medal record
Women's karate
Representing France
European Championships
Bronze medal – third place	2019 Guadalajara	Individual kata
Bronze medal – third place	2022 Gaziantep	Team kata

Alexandra Feracci (born 10 October 1992) is a French karateka. She won one of the bronze medal in the women's individual kata event at the 2019 European Karate Championships held in Guadalajara, Spain.

Feracci represented France at the 2020 Summer Olympics in Tokyo, Japan. She competed in the women's kata event.

== Career ==
Feracci won one of the bronze medals in her event at the 2016 World University Karate Championships held in Braga, Portugal.

In 2018, Feracci lost her bronze medal match in the women's individual kata event at the World Karate Championships in Madrid, Spain. She lost her bronze medal match in the women's individual kata event at the 2019 European Games held in Minsk, Belarus. In that same year, she also competed in the women's individual kata event at the 2019 World Beach Games held in Doha, Qatar without winning a medal.

Feracci qualified at the World Olympic Qualification Tournament in Paris, France to represent France at the 2020 Summer Olympics in Tokyo, Japan. In the women's kata event, she finished in 4th place in the elimination round and she did not advance to compete in a medal match.

She won one of the bronze medals in the women's team kata event at the 2022 European Karate Championships held in Gaziantep, Turkey.

== Personal life ==
Her sister Laetitia Feracci also competes in karate.

== Achievements ==
Year	Competition	Venue	Rank	Event
2019	European Championships	Guadalajara, Spain	3rd	Individual kata
2022	European Championships	Gaziantep, Turkey	3rd	Team kata
