= Dilara Bozan =

Turkish karateka (born 1997)

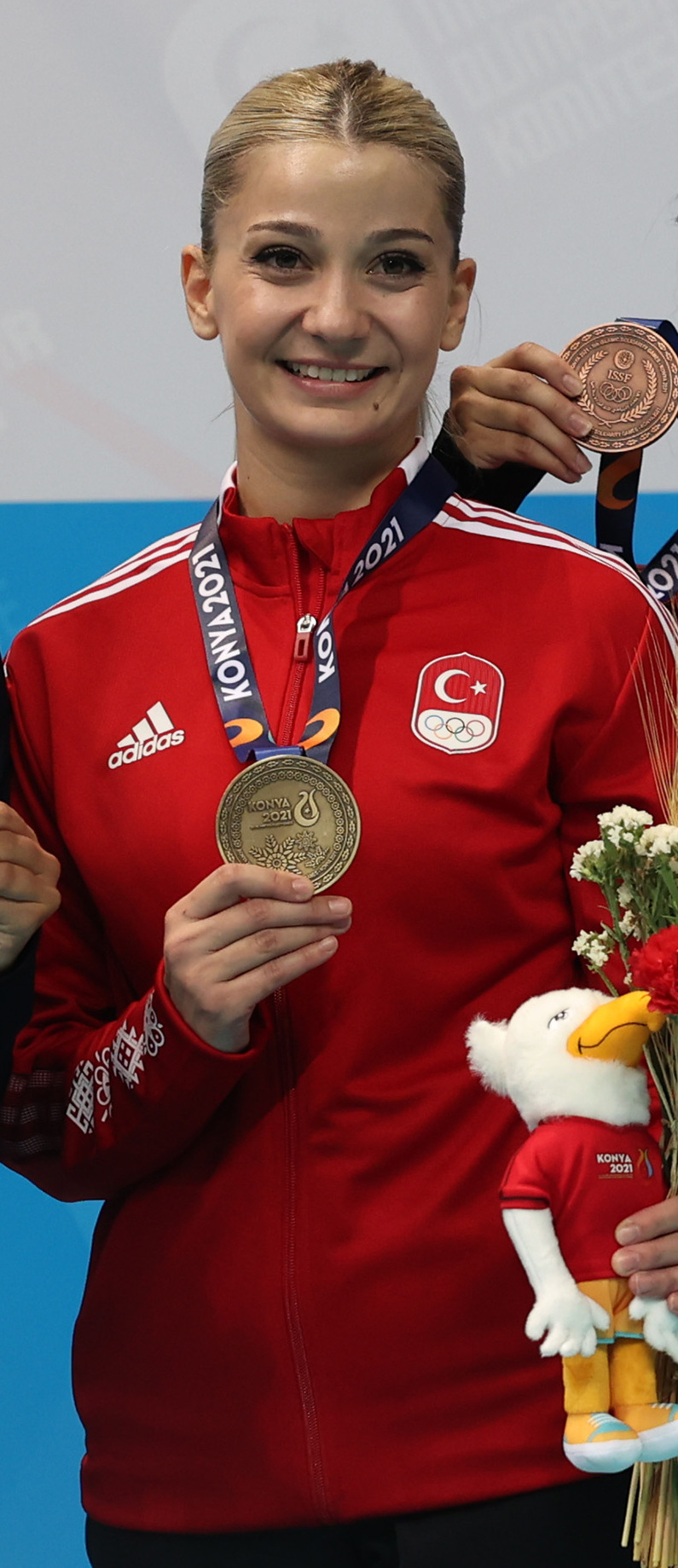

Personal information
- Born: 28 March 1997 (age 29) Iğdır, Turkey

Sport
- Country: Turkey
- Sport: Karate
- Events: Individual kata; Team kata
Medal record
Women's karate
Representing Turkey
World Championships
Bronze medal – third place	2016 Linz	Team kata
Bronze medal – third place	2018 Madrid	Team kata
European Championships
Gold medal – first place	2015 Istanbul	Team kata
Gold medal – first place	2024 Zadar	Individual kata
Silver medal – second place	2015 Istanbul	Individual kata
Silver medal – second place	2021 Poreč	Individual kata
Silver medal – second place	2022 Gaziantep	Individual kata
Bronze medal – third place	2014 Tampere	Individual kata
Bronze medal – third place	2016 Montpellier	Individual kata
Bronze medal – third place	2016 Montpellier	Team kata
Bronze medal – third place	2017 İzmit	Individual kata
Bronze medal – third place	2017 İzmit	Team kata
Bronze medal – third place	2018 Novi Sad	Individual kata
Bronze medal – third place	2018 Novi Sad	Team kata
Bronze medal – third place	2019 Guadalajara	Individual kata
Bronze medal – third place	2023 Guadalajara	Individual kata
Bronze medal – third place	2025 Yerevan	Individual kata
European Games
Bronze medal – third place	2015 Baku	Individual kata
Bronze medal – third place	2019 Minsk	Individual kata
Islamic Solidarity Games
Gold medal – first place	2017 Baku	Individual kata
Gold medal – first place	2021 Konya	Individual kata
Silver medal – second place	2025 Riyadh	Individual kata

Dilara Bozan (born 28 March 1997) is a Turkish karateka. She is a two-time gold medalist in the women's individual kata event at the Islamic Solidarity Games. She is also a ten-time medalist, including gold, in this event at the European Karate Championships.

== Career ==
Bozan won the bronze medal in the women's kata event at the 2015 European Games held in Baku, Azerbaijan. She won the gold medal in the women's individual kata event at the 2017 Islamic Solidarity Games held in Baku, Azerbaijan.

At the 2018 European Karate Championships held in Novi Sad, Serbia, she won one of the bronze medals in both the individual and team kata events. In the same year, she also competed in the women's individual kata event at the 2018 World Karate Championships held in Madrid, Spain.

In 2019, Bozan represented Turkey at the European Games in Minsk, Belarus and she won one of the bronze medals in the women's individual kata event. In 2019, she also competed in the women's individual kata event at the 2019 World Beach Games held in Doha, Qatar without winning a medal.

In 2021, Bozan won the silver medal in her event at the European Karate Championships held in Poreč, Croatia. She qualified at the World Olympic Qualification Tournament in Paris, France to represent Turkey at the 2020 Summer Olympics in Tokyo, Japan, resulting in her getting 5th place after getting defeated by Italy's Viviana Bottaro.

Bozan won the silver medal in the women's individual kata event at the 2022 European Karate Championships held in Gaziantep, Turkey. She won the gold medal in the women's individual kata event at the 2021 Islamic Solidarity Games held in Konya, Turkey.

Bozan won one of the bronze medals in the women's individual kata event at the 2023 European Karate Championships held in Guadalajara, Spain. She lost her bronze medal match in the women's individual kata event at the 2023 World Karate Championships held in Budapest, Hungary.

Bozan won the gold medal in the women's individual kata event at the 2024 European Karate Championships held in Zadar, Croatia.

== Achievements ==
Year	Competition	Venue	Rank	Event
2014	European Championships	Tampere, Finland	3rd	Individual kata
2015	European Championships	Istanbul, Turkey	2nd	Individual kata
2015	European Championships	Istanbul, Turkey	1st	Team kata
2015	European Games	Baku, Azerbaijan	3rd	Individual kata
2016	European Championships	Montpellier, France	3rd	Individual kata
2016	European Championships	Montpellier, France	3rd	Team kata
2016	World Championships	Linz, Austria	3rd	Team kata
2017	European Championships	İzmit, Turkey	3rd	Individual kata
2017	European Championships	İzmit, Turkey	3rd	Team kata
2017	Islamic Solidarity Games	Baku, Azerbaijan	1st	Individual kata
2018	European Championships	Novi Sad, Serbia	3rd	Individual kata
2018	European Championships	Novi Sad, Serbia	3rd	Team kata
2018	World Championships	Madrid, Spain	3rd	Team kata
2019	European Championships	Guadalajara, Spain	3rd	Individual kata
2019	European Games	Minsk, Belarus	3rd	Individual kata
2021	European Championships	Poreč, Croatia	2nd	Individual kata
2022	European Championships	Gaziantep, Turkey	2nd	Individual kata
2022	Islamic Solidarity Games	Konya, Turkey	1st	Individual kata
2023	European Championships	Guadalajara, Spain	3rd	Individual kata
2024	European Championships	Zadar, Croatia	1st	Individual kata
2025	European Championships	Yerevan, Armenia	3rd	Individual kata
