= Terryana D'Onofrio =

Italian karateka (born 1997)

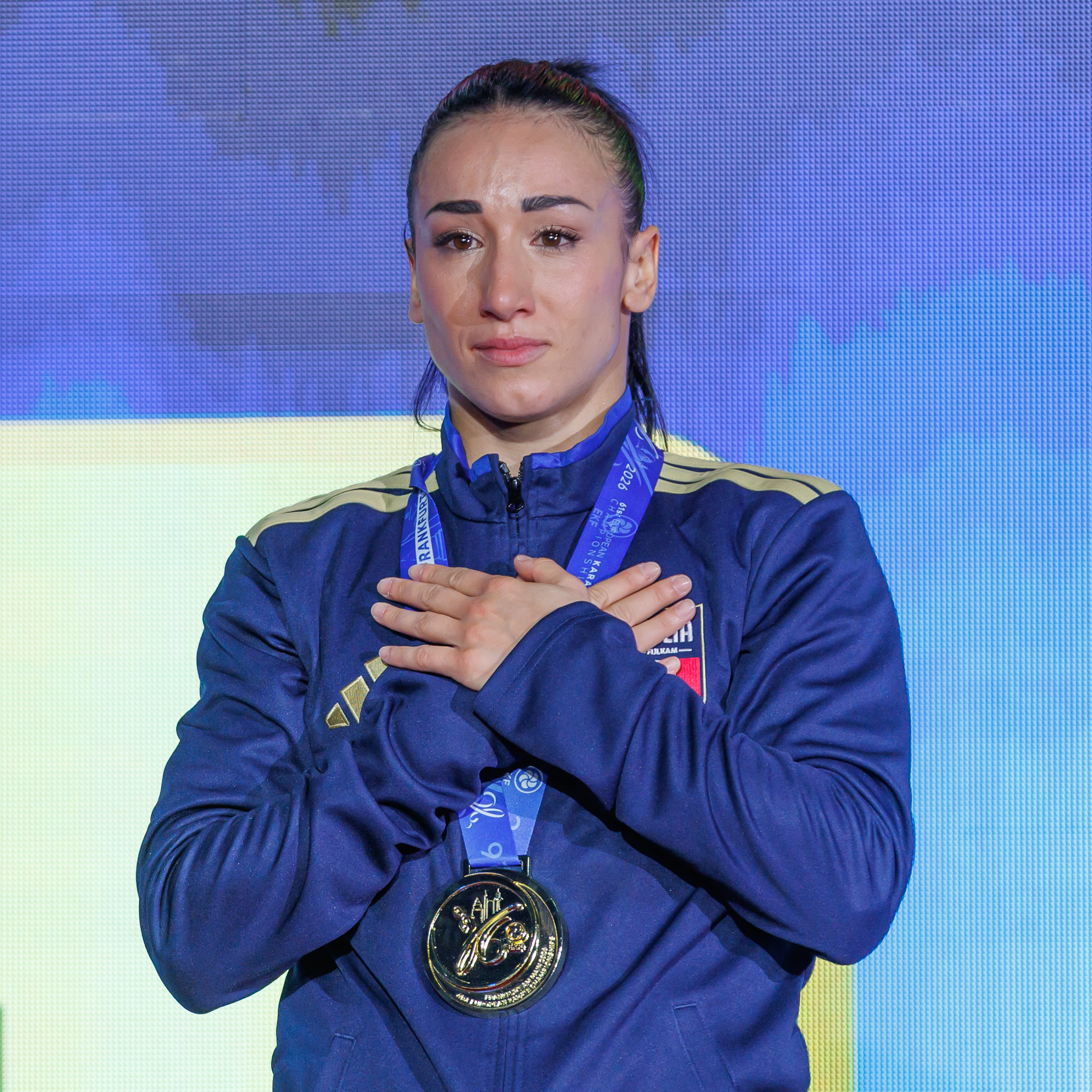

Personal information
- Born: 28 January 1997 (age 29) Marsicovetere, Italy

Sport
- Country: Italy
- Sport: Karate
- Events: Individual kata; Team kata
Medal record
Women's karate
Representing Italy
World Championships
Silver medal – second place	2023 Budapest	Team kata
Bronze medal – third place	2018 Madrid	Team kata
Bronze medal – third place	2021 Dubai	Team kata
Bronze medal – third place	2023 Budapest	Individual kata
Bronze medal – third place	2025 Cairo	Individual kata
European Championships
Gold medal – first place	2018 Novi Sad	Team kata
Gold medal – first place	2021 Poreč	Team kata
Gold medal – first place	2022 Gaziantep	Team kata
Gold medal – first place	2023 Guadalajara	Team kata
Gold medal – first place	2025 Yerevan	Individual kata
Gold medal – first place	2026 Frankfurt	Individual kata
Silver medal – second place	2019 Guadalajara	Team kata
Silver medal – second place	2024 Zadar	Individual kata
Silver medal – second place	2024 Zadar	Team kata
Bronze medal – third place	2022 Gaziantep	Individual kata
Bronze medal – third place	2023 Guadalajara	Individual kata
Bronze medal – third place	2025 Yerevan	Team kata
World University Karate Championships
Silver medal – second place	2018 Kobe	Individual kata

Terryana D'Onofrio (born 28 January 1997) is an Italian karateka. She won the gold medal in the women's kata event at the 2025 European Karate Championships held in Yerevan, Armenia. She is a five-time medalist at the World Karate Championships. D'Onofrio is also a four-time gold medalist in the women's team kata event at the European Karate Championships.

== Career ==
D'Onofrio won the silver medal in the women's kata event at the 2018 World University Karate Championships held in Kobe, Japan. She also won one of the bronze medals in the women's team kata event at the 2018 World Karate Championships held in Madrid, Spain.

In 2019, D'Onofrio competed in the women's individual kata event at the World Beach Games held in Doha, Qatar.

D'Onofrio won one of the bronze medals in the women's individual kata event at the 2022 European Karate Championships held in Gaziantep, Turkey. She won the gold medal in the women's team kata event. She repeated this at the 2023 European Karate Championships in Guadalajara, Spain with a bronze medal in the women's individual kata event and the gold medal in the women's team kata event.

In October 2023, D'Onofrio won one of the bronze medals in the women's individual kata event at the World Karate Championships held in Budapest, Hungary. She defeated Dilara Bozan of Turkey in her bronze medal match. D'Onofrio also won the silver medal in the women's team kata event.

D'Onofrio won the silver medal in the women's individual kata event at the 2024 European Karate Championships held in Zadar, Croatia. She also won the silver medal in the women's team kata event. A year later, D'Onofrio won the gold medal in the women's individual kata event at the 2025 European Karate Championships held in Yerevan, Armenia. She also won one of the bronze medals in the women's team kata event.

== Achievements ==
Year	Competition	Venue	Rank	Event
2018	European Championships	Novi Sad, Serbia	1st	Team kata
2018	World Championships	Madrid, Spain	3rd	Team kata
2019	European Championships	Guadalajara, Spain	2nd	Team kata
2021	European Championships	Poreč, Croatia	1st	Team kata
2021	World Championships	Dubai, United Arab Emirates	3rd	Team kata
2022	European Championships	Gaziantep, Turkey	3rd	Individual kata
2022	European Championships	Gaziantep, Turkey	1st	Team kata
2023	European Championships	Guadalajara, Spain	3rd	Individual kata
2023	European Championships	Guadalajara, Spain	1st	Team kata
2023	World Championships	Budapest, Hungary	3rd	Individual kata
2023	World Championships	Budapest, Hungary	2nd	Team kata
2024	European Championships	Zadar, Croatia	2nd	Individual kata
2024	European Championships	Zadar, Croatia	2nd	Team kata
2025	European Championships	Yerevan, Armenia	1st	Individual kata
2025	European Championships	Yerevan, Armenia	3rd	Team kata
2025	World Championships	Cairo, Egypt	3rd	Individual kata
2026	European Championships	Frankfurt, Germany	1st	Individual kata
