= Jasmin Jüttner =

German karateka (born 1993)

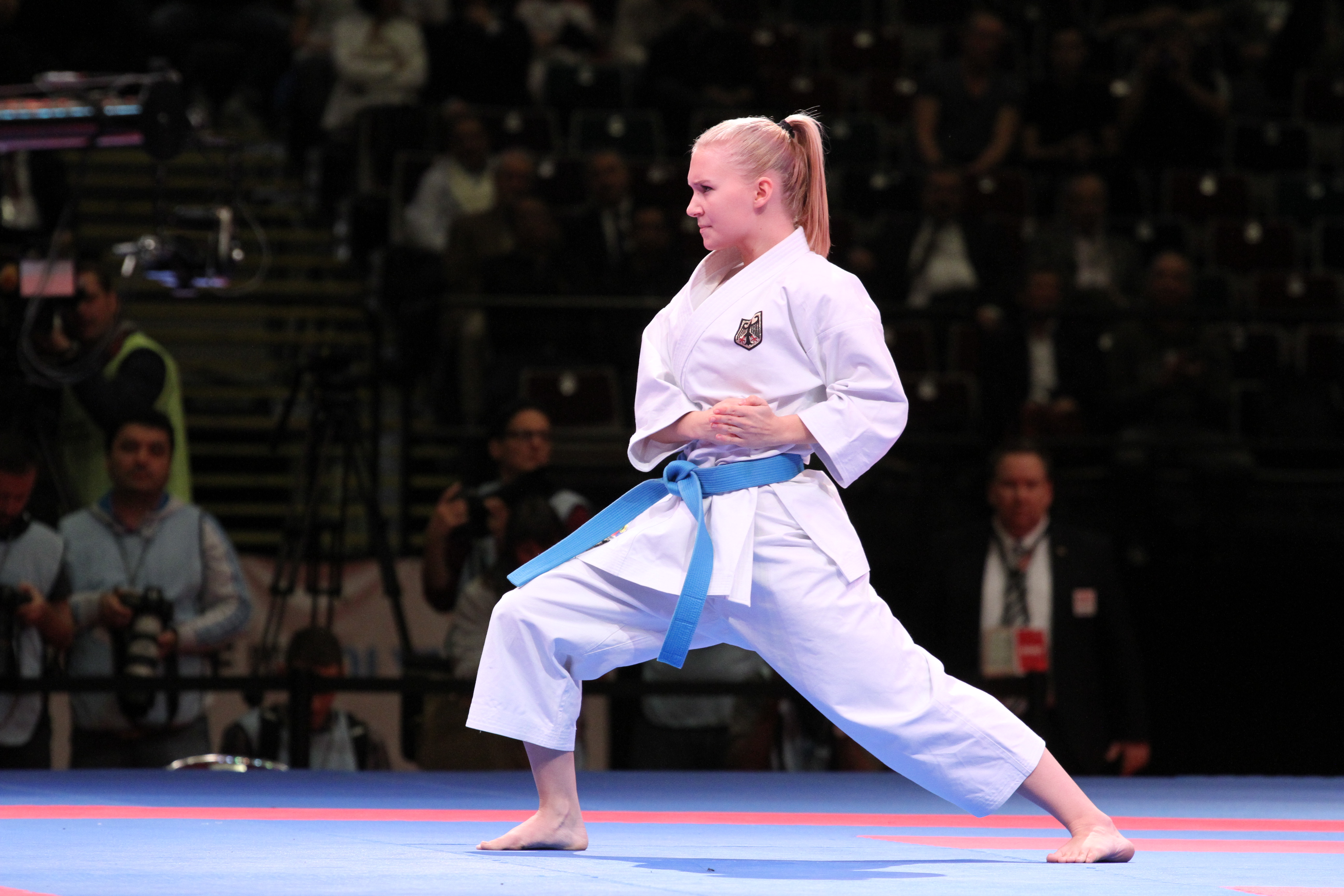
- Jüttner at the 2014 World Karate Championships

Personal information
- Born: 22 May 1993 (age 33) Aschaffenburg, Germany

Sport
- Country: Germany
- Sport: Karate
- Event: Individual kata
Medal record
Women's karate
Representing Germany
World Championships
| Bronze medal – third place | 2014 Bremen | Individual kata |
European Championships
| Silver medal – second place | 2016 Montpellier | Individual kata |
| Bronze medal – third place | 2015 Istanbul | Individual kata |
| Bronze medal – third place | 2022 Gaziantep | Individual kata |
| Bronze medal – third place | 2024 Zadar | Individual kata |

Jasmin Jüttner (née Bleul; 22 May 1993) is a German karateka. She is a multiple German champion in the kata discipline.

== Career ==
Jüttner began taking karate lessons at TV Strötzbach at the age of seven. After she was accepted into the Bayern squad, she started for the KD Untermerzbach for a few years. Since 2005, she has been training in the Budocenter of the kata trainer Efthimios Karamitsos in Frankfurt. From 2007 to 2016, she had been German champion in kata singles 10 consecutive occasions. In 2013, she was Shōtōkan world champion in Liverpool in the WSKA with the German women's national kata team. In November 2014, she became WKF world champion in Bremen with the team of the national kata team. In November 2014, she was also elected athlete of the month by ran with the women's national team. Her favorite kata is the Unsu. In preparation for the competition, she is on the mat up to eleven times a week. She wears the third Dan Shōtōkan karate. She received her third Dan in recognition of her achievements at the 2014 Karate World Cup.

Jüttner secured her places on the German squad in the women's kata category by finishing among the top four in the final pool round of the 2021 World Qualification Tournament in Paris, France. In November 2021, she competed at the 2021 World Karate Championships held in Dubai, United Arab Emirates.

She won one of the bronze medals in the women's individual kata event at the 2022 European Karate Championships held in Gaziantep, Turkey. She competed in the women's kata at the 2022 World Games held in Birmingham, United States.

She won one of the bronze medals in the women's individual kata event at the 2024 European Karate Championships held in Zadar, Croatia.

== Personal life ==
Jüttner has been married to karateka Philip Jüttner since September 2017.
