= Karate at the 2015 European Games – Qualification =

There will be a total of 96 qualifying places available for karate at the 2015 European Games: 48 for men and 48 for women. Eight athletes will compete in each of the 12 events. Each competing nation will be allowed to enter a maximum of 12 competitors, one in each weight class. Hosts Azerbaijan is also allowed to enter an athlete in each weight class. Quota places will be allocated to the competitor(s) that achieved the place in the qualification events.

== Qualification summary ==
NOC	Men						Women						Total
NOC	60kg	67kg	75kg	84kg	+84kg	Kata	50kg	55kg	61kg	68kg	+68kg	Kata	Total
Albania	X												1
Austria							X			X			2
Azerbaijan	X	X	X	X	X	X	X	X	X	X	X	X	12
Belarus							X						1
Belgium									X				1
Bulgaria											X		1
Croatia		X					X	X	X		X	X	6
Czech Republic												X	1
Cyprus			X										1
Denmark						X							1
Finland						X					X		2
France	X	X	X	X		X	X	X	X		X	X	10
Georgia		X											1
Germany		X	X		X		X					X	5
Greece				X	X					X			3
Hungary		X											1
Iceland										X			1
Ireland												X	1
Italy	X		X	X		X							4
Kosovo				X									1
Latvia			X										1
Luxembourg								X					1
Macedonia	X				X								2
Montenegro										X			1
Netherlands					X								1
Norway								X					1
Poland				X									1
Portugal					X								1
Romania						X							1
Russia	X										X		2
Serbia	X				X			X					3
Slovakia									X				1
Slovenia									X				1
Spain	X	X				X		X	X	X		X	7
Sweden											X		1
Switzerland										X			1
Turkey		X	X	X	X	X	X	X	X	X	X	X	11
Ukraine			X	X			X						3
38 NOCs	8	8	8	8	8	8	8	8	8	8	8	8	96

== Qualification timeline ==
Event	Date	Venue
2015 European Karate Championships	19–22 March 2015	(Turkey) Istanbul
Allocation of quota places	24 March 2015	

== Men ==
=== 60 kg ===
Means of qualification	Total places	Qualified athletes
Host nation	1	Azerbaijan
European Championships	6	Luca Maresca (ITA); Sofiane Agoudjil (FRA); Evgeny Plakhutin (RUS); Matías Gómez (ESP); Marko Antić (SRB); Emil Pavlov (MKD)
Universality place	1	Halil Marqeshi (ALB)
Total	8	

=== 67 kg ===
Means of qualification	Total places	Qualified athletes
Host nation	1	Niyazi Aliyev (AZE)
European Championships	6	Burak Uygur (TUR); Danil Domdjoni (CRO); Manuel Rasero (ESP); Yves Martial Tadissi (HUN); Steven Da Costa (FRA); Ricardo Giegler (GER)
Universality place	1	Irakli Tkebuchava (GEO)
Total	8	

=== 75 kg ===
Means of qualification	Total places	Qualified athletes
Host nation	1	Rafael Aghayev (AZE)
European Championships	6	Noah Bitsch (GER); Luigi Busà (ITA); Ruslans Sadikovs (LAT); Erman Eltemur (TUR); Logan Da Costa (FRA); Illya Nikulin (UKR)
Universality place	1	Panayiotis Loizides (CYP)
Total	8	

=== 84 kg ===
Means of qualification	Total places	Qualified athletes
Host nation	1	Aykhan Mamayev (AZE)
European Championships	6	Nello Maestri (ITA); Kenji Grillon (FRA); Ugur Aktas (TUR); Alvin Karaqi (KOS); Georgios Tzanos (GRE); Yaroslav Horuna (UKR)
Universality place	1	Kamil Warda (POL)
Total	8	

=== +84 kg ===
Means of qualification	Total places	Qualified athletes
Host nation	1	Azerbaijan
European Championships	6	Slobodan Bitević (SRB); Enes Erkan (TUR); Martin Nestorovski (MKD); Jonathan Horne (GER); Felipe Reis (POR); Spyridon Margaritopoulos (GRE)
Universality place	1	Moreno Sheppard (NED)
Total	8	

=== Kata ===
Means of qualification	Total places	Qualified athletes
Host nation	1	Tural Baljanli (AZE)
European Championships	6	Damián Quintero (ESP); Mehmet Yakan (TUR); Vu Duc Minh Dack (FRA); Mattia Busato (ITA); Christopher Rohde (DEN); Pasi Hirvonen (FIN)
Universality place	1	Adrian Guta (ROU)
Total	8	

== Women ==
=== 50 kg ===
Means of qualification	Total places	Qualified athletes
Host nation	1	Azerbaijan
European Championships	6	Bettina Plank (AUT); Alexandra Recchia (FRA); Duygu Bugur (GER); Serap Özçelik (TUR); Monika Berulec (CRO); Kateryna Kryva (UKR)
Universality place	1	Mariya Koulinkvich (BLR)
Total	8	

=== 55 kg ===
Means of qualification	Total places	Qualified athletes
Host nation	1	Azerbaijan
European Championships	6	Emilie Thouy (FRA); Tuba Yakan (TUR); Jennifer Warling (LUX); Cristina Ferrer (ESP); Branka Aranđelović (SRB); Jelena Kovačević (CRO)
Universality place	1	Bettina Alstadsæther (NOR)
Total	8	

=== 61 kg ===
Means of qualification	Total places	Qualified athletes
Host nation	1	Azerbaijan
European Championships	6	Lucie Ignace (FRA); Ana Lenard (CRO); Ingrida Suchánková (SVK); Irene Colomar (ESP); Merve Çoban (TUR); Tjaša Ristić (SLO)
Universality place	1	Nele De Vos (BEL)
Total	8	

=== 68 kg ===
Means of qualification	Total places	Qualified athletes
Host nation	1	Azerbaijan
European Championships	6	Alisa Buchinger (AUT); Elena Quirici (SUI); Marina Raković (MNE); Cristina Vizcaíno (ESP); Vassiliki Panetsidou (GRE); Hafsa Şeyda Burucu (TUR)
Universality place	1	Telma Rut Frímannsdóttir (ISL)
Total	8	

=== +68 kg ===
Means of qualification	Total places	Qualified athletes
Host nation	1	Azerbaijan
European Championships	6	Maša Martinović (CRO); Meltem Hocaoğlu (TUR); Helena Kuusisto (FIN); Nadège Ait-Ibrahim (FRA); Ivanna Zaytseva (RUS); Hana Antunovic (SWE)
Universality place	1	Borislava Ganeva (BUL)
Total	8	

=== Kata ===
Means of qualification	Total places	Qualified athletes
Host nation	1	Azerbaijan
European Championships	6	Sandra Sánchez (ESP); Dilara Bozan (TUR); Jasmin Bleul (GER); Veronika Mišková (CZE); Sandy Scordo (FRA); Vlatka Kiuk (CRO)
Universality place	1	Karen Dolphin (IRL)
Total	8	
