= 2018 European Karate Championships =

Karate competition

- Venue: SPC Vojvodina
- Location: Novi Sad, Serbia
- Dates: 10–13 May
- Competitors: 532 from 52 nations

The 2018 European Karate Championships were the 53rd edition of the European Karate Championships, and were held in Novi Sad, Serbia from 10 to 13 May 2018.

== Medal table ==
* Host nation (Serbia)

Rank	Nation	Gold	Silver	Bronze	Total
1	Spain	3	2	1	6
2	Turkey	3	1	6	10
3	Italy	2	3	5	10
4	France	2	0	3	5
5	Switzerland	2	0	0	2
6	Azerbaijan	1	2	2	5
7	Ukraine	1	1	2	4
8	Bosnia and Herzegovina	1	0	1	2
9	Republic of Macedonia (MKD)	1	0	0	1
10	Croatia	0	2	2	4
11	Austria	0	1	1	2
11	Hungary	0	1	1	2
11	Russia	0	1	1	2
11	Serbia*	0	1	1	2
15	Greece	0	1	0	1
16	Georgia	0	0	1	1
16	Latvia	0	0	1	1
16	Netherlands	0	0	1	1
16	Portugal	0	0	1	1
16	Slovakia	0	0	1	1
16	Slovenia	0	0	1	1
Totals (21 entries)		16	16	32	64

== Medalists ==
=== Men ===
Event	Gold	Silver	Bronze
Individual kata	Damián Quintero; Spain	Ali Sofuoğlu; Turkey	Roman Heydarov; Azerbaijan
Individual kata	Damián Quintero; Spain	Ali Sofuoğlu; Turkey	Mattia Busato; Italy
Team kata	Spain; José Carbonell; Sergio Galán; Francisco Salazar	Russia; Maksim Ksenofontov; Mehman Rzaev; Emil Skovorodnikov	Italy; Gianluca Gallo; Alessandro Iodice; Giuseppe Panagia
Team kata	Spain; José Carbonell; Sergio Galán; Francisco Salazar	Russia; Maksim Ksenofontov; Mehman Rzaev; Emil Skovorodnikov	Turkey; Kutluhan Duran; Emre Vefa Göktaş; Ali Sofuoğlu
Kumite −60 kg	Emil Pavlov; Macedonia	Angelo Crescenzo; Italy	Evgeny Plakhutin; Russia
Kumite −60 kg	Emil Pavlov; Macedonia	Angelo Crescenzo; Italy	Kalvis Kalniņš; Latvia
Kumite −67 kg	Burak Uygur; Turkey	Stefan Joksić; Serbia	Stefan Pokorny; Austria
Kumite −67 kg	Burak Uygur; Turkey	Stefan Joksić; Serbia	Yves Martial Tadissi; Hungary
Kumite −75 kg	Rafael Aghayev; Azerbaijan	Gábor Hárspataki; Hungary	Stanislav Horuna; Ukraine
Kumite −75 kg	Rafael Aghayev; Azerbaijan	Gábor Hárspataki; Hungary	Luigi Busà; Italy
Kumite −84 kg	Michele Martina; Italy	Ivan Kvesić; Croatia	Hélio Hernandez; Portugal
Kumite −84 kg	Michele Martina; Italy	Ivan Kvesić; Croatia	Uğur Aktaş; Turkey
Kumite +84 kg	Ivan Klepić; Bosnia and Herzegovina	Shahin Atamov; Azerbaijan	Tyron-Darnell Lardy; Netherlands
Kumite +84 kg	Ivan Klepić; Bosnia and Herzegovina	Shahin Atamov; Azerbaijan	Gogita Arkania; Georgia
Team kumite	Turkey; Rıdvan Kaptan; Erman Eltemur; Uğur Aktaş; Burak Uygur; Alparslan Yamanoğlu; Ömer Kemaloğlu; Samed Gök	Spain; Pablo Arenas; Samy Ennkhaili; Rodrigo Ibáñez; Raúl Cuerva; Babacar Seck; Jagoba Vizuete; Alejandro Molina	Ukraine; Ryzvan Talibov; Kostiantyn Tsymbal; Stanislav Horuna; Andriy Toroshanko; Ihor Uhnich; Valerii Chobotar; Oleksandr Grevtsov
Team kumite	Turkey; Rıdvan Kaptan; Erman Eltemur; Uğur Aktaş; Burak Uygur; Alparslan Yamanoğlu; Ömer Kemaloğlu; Samed Gök	Spain; Pablo Arenas; Samy Ennkhaili; Rodrigo Ibáñez; Raúl Cuerva; Babacar Seck; Jagoba Vizuete; Alejandro Molina	Serbia; Dejan Cvrkota; Nteros Anastasios; Slobodan Bitević; Nikola Jovanović; Stefan Joksić; Uroš Mijalković; Vladimir Brežančić

=== Women ===
Event	Gold	Silver	Bronze
Individual kata	Sandra Sánchez; Spain	Viviana Bottaro; Italy	Dilara Bozan; Turkey
Individual kata	Sandra Sánchez; Spain	Viviana Bottaro; Italy	Dorota Balciarová; Slovakia
Team kata	Italy; Sara Battaglia; Michela Pezzetti; Terryana D'Onofrio	Spain; Marta García; Lidia Rodríguez; Raquel Roy	France; Marie Bui; Lila Bui; Jessica Hugues
Team kata	Italy; Sara Battaglia; Michela Pezzetti; Terryana D'Onofrio	Spain; Marta García; Lidia Rodríguez; Raquel Roy	Turkey; Dilara Bozan; Rabia Küsmüş; Gizem Sofuoğlu
Kumite −50 kg	Serap Özçelik Arapoğlu; Turkey	Bettina Plank; Austria	Nurana Aliyeva; Azerbaijan
Kumite −50 kg	Serap Özçelik Arapoğlu; Turkey	Bettina Plank; Austria	Alexandra Recchia; France
Kumite −55 kg	Anzhelika Terliuga; Ukraine	Alessandra Hasani; Croatia	Sara Cardin; Italy
Kumite −55 kg	Anzhelika Terliuga; Ukraine	Alessandra Hasani; Croatia	Tuba Yakan; Turkey
Kumite −61 kg	Lucie Ignace; France	Anita Serogina; Ukraine	Merve Çoban; Turkey
Kumite −61 kg	Lucie Ignace; France	Anita Serogina; Ukraine	Tjaša Ristić; Slovenia
Kumite −68 kg	Elena Quirici; Switzerland	Irina Zaretska; Azerbaijan	Silvia Semeraro; Italy
Kumite −68 kg	Elena Quirici; Switzerland	Irina Zaretska; Azerbaijan	Ivona Ćavar; Bosnia and Herzegovina
Kumite +68 kg	Anne-Laure Florentin; France	Eleni Chatziliadou; Greece	Laura Palacio; Spain
Kumite +68 kg	Anne-Laure Florentin; France	Eleni Chatziliadou; Greece	Ana-Marija Bujas Čelan; Croatia
Team kumite	Switzerland; Noémie Kornfeld; Nina Radjenovic; Ramona Brüderlin; Elena Quirici	Italy; Clio Ferracuti; Laura Pasqua; Sara Cardin; Silvia Semeraro	France; Léa Avazeri; Gwendoline Philippe; Nancy Garcia; Sophia Bouderbane
Team kumite	Switzerland; Noémie Kornfeld; Nina Radjenovic; Ramona Brüderlin; Elena Quirici	Italy; Clio Ferracuti; Laura Pasqua; Sara Cardin; Silvia Semeraro	Croatia; Alessandra Hasani; Ana-Marija Bujas Čelan; Ana Lenard; Marina Barac

== Participating nations ==
532 athletes from 52 nations competed.

- Albania (4)
- Andorra (1)
- Armenia (7)
- Austria (13)
- Azerbaijan (15)
- Belarus (12)
- Belgium (12)
- Bosnia and Herzegovina (15)
- Bulgaria (11)
- Croatia (16)
- Cyprus (4)
- Czech Republic (9)
- Denmark (12)
- England (14)
- Estonia (6)
- Finland (12)
- France (16)
- FYR Macedonia (13)
- Georgia (6)
- Germany (14)
- Greece (15)
- Hungary (14)
- Iceland (1)
- Ireland (10)
- Israel (13)
- Italy (15)
- Latvia (12)
- Liechtenstein (1)
- Lithuania (9)
- Luxembourg (2)
- Kosovo (13)
- Malta (1)
- Moldova (3)
- Montenegro (15)
- Netherlands (14)
- Northern Ireland (1)
- Norway (7)
- Poland (15)
- Portugal (12)
- Romania (16)
- Russia (16)
- San Marino (1)
- Serbia (16)
- Scotland (5)
- Slovakia (14)
- Slovenia (11)
- Spain (16)
- Sweden (8)
- Switzerland (10)
- Turkey (16)
- Ukraine (14)
- Wales (4)

== Para Karate ==
The first Para-Karate European Championships was held May 10-13 in 2018. 43 athletes from 15 nations in 6 events was competed. Results:

Rank	Nation	Gold	Silver	Bronze	Total
1	Germany	2	0	1	3
2	France	2	0	0	2
3	Russia	1	2	2	5
4	Spain	1	0	1	2
5	Hungary	0	1	1	2
6	Romania	0	1	0	1
6	Serbia	0	1	0	1
6	Wales	0	1	0	1
9	Latvia	0	0	1	1
Totals (9 entries)		6	6	6	18
