= 2016 European Karate Championships =

Karate competition

- Location: Montpellier, France
- Dates: 5–8 May
- Competitors: 508 from 46 nations

The 2016 European Karate Championships, the 51st edition, was held at Montpellier in France from 5 to 8 May 2016. A total of 508 competitors from 46 countries participated at the event.

== Medal table ==
* Host nation (France)

Rank	Nation	Gold	Silver	Bronze	Total
1	France*	6	2	3	11
2	Spain	4	1	1	6
3	Azerbaijan	2	0	1	3
4	Turkey	1	5	6	12
5	Italy	1	2	3	6
6	Germany	1	1	2	4
7	Switzerland	1	0	0	1
8	Croatia	0	1	3	4
9	Austria	0	1	0	1
9	Bosnia and Herzegovina	0	1	0	1
9	Finland	0	1	0	1
9	Ukraine	0	1	0	1
13	Serbia	0	0	4	4
14	Netherlands	0	0	2	2
15	Belarus	0	0	1	1
15	England	0	0	1	1
15	Greece	0	0	1	1
15	Hungary	0	0	1	1
15	Montenegro	0	0	1	1
15	North Macedonia	0	0	1	1
15	Portugal	0	0	1	1
Totals (21 entries)		16	16	32	64

== Medalists ==
=== Men's competition ===
==== Individual ====
Event	Gold	Silver	Bronze
Kata	(Spain) Damián Quintero	(France) Vu Duc Minh Dack	(Azerbaijan) Roman Heydarov (Italy) Mattia Busato
Kumite –60 kg	(Spain) Matías Gómez	(Turkey) Aykut Kaya	(North Macedonia) Emil Pavlov (Serbia) Marko Antić
Kumite –67 kg	(France) Steven Da Costa	(Italy) Gianluca De Vivo	(Hungary) Yves Martial Tadissi (England) Jordan Thomas
Kumite –75 kg	(Azerbaijan) Rafael Aghayev	(Turkey) Erman Eltemur	(Netherlands) René Smaal (France) Logan Da Costa
Kumite –84 kg	(Turkey) Uğur Aktaş	(Bosnia and Herzegovina) Meris Muhović	(Germany) Noah Bitsch (Greece) Georgios Tzanos
Kumite +84 kg	(Germany) Jonathan Horne	(Italy) Stefano Maniscalco	(Turkey) Enes Erkan (France) Salim Bendiab

==== Team ====
Event	Gold	Silver	Bronze
Kata	France; Lucas Jeannot; Enzo Montarello; Ahmed Zemouri	Spain; José Carbonell; Damián Quintero; Francisco Salazar	Turkey; Osman Evin; Mehmet Yakan; Fikret Yılmaz Croatia; Ivan Ermenc; Damjan Padovan; Tomislav Stolar
Kumite	France; Lonni Boulesnane; Jessie Da Costa; Logan Da Costa; Steven Da Costa; Marvin Garin; Kenji Grillon; Corentin Séguy	Turkey; Uğur Aktaş; Samet Develi; Erman Eltemur; Enes Erkan; Gökhan Gündüz; Rıdvan Kaptan; Alparslan Yamanoğlu	Serbia; Slobodan Bitević; Dejan Cvrkota; Danilo Jeknić; Stefan Joksić; Mihajlo Josipović; Aleksandar Šestakov; Bogdan Trikoš Portugal; Miguel Diz; Hélio Hernandez; Nuno Mestre; Nuno Moreira; Hugo Pina; Filipe Reis; Tomás Silva

=== Women's competition ===
==== Individual ====
Event	Gold	Silver	Bronze
Kata	(Spain) Sandra Sánchez	(France) Sandy Scordo	(Turkey) Dilara Bozan (Italy) Viviana Bottaro
Kumite –50 kg	(France) Alexandra Recchia	(Turkey) Serap Özçelik	(Serbia) Jelena Milivojčević (Belarus) Mariya Koulinkovitich
Kumite –55 kg	(Italy) Sara Cardin	(Ukraine) Anzhelika Terliuga	(Turkey) Büşra Tosun (Spain) Cristina Ferrer
Kumite –61 kg	(France) Lucie Ignace	(Turkey) Merve Çoban	(Croatia) Ana Lenard (Serbia) Jovana Preković
Kumite –68 kg	(Switzerland) Elena Quirici	(Austria) Alisa Buchinger	(Netherlands) Sherilyn Wold (Germany) Johanna Kneer
Kumite +68 kg	(France) Anne-Laure Florentin	(Finland) Helena Kuusisto	(Montenegro) Dragana Konjević (Croatia) Maša Martinović

==== Team ====
Event	Gold	Silver	Bronze
Kata	Spain; Gema Morales; Margarita Morata; Paula Rodríguez	Germany; Jasmin Bleul; Christine Heinrich; Sophie Wachter	Italy; Sara Battaglia; Viviana Bottaro; Michela Pezzetti Turkey; Dilara Bozan; Rabia Küsmüş; Gizem Şahin
Kumite	Azerbaijan; Farida Abiyeva; Nurana Aliyeva; Ilaha Gasimova; Irina Zaretska	Croatia; Ana-Marija Bujas Čelan; Ana Lenard; Azra Saleš; Ivona Tubić	Turkey; Merve Çoban; Serap Özçelik; Büşra Tosun; Büşra Şeyda Turan France; Alizée Agier; Nadège Ait-Ibrahim; Lucie Ignace; Alexandra Recchia

== Participating countries ==
- Andorra (2)
- Armenia (2)
- Austria (15)
- Azerbaijan (14)
- Belarus (10)
- Belgium (14)
- Bosnia and Herzegovina (18)
- Bulgaria (11)
- Croatia (24)
- Cyprus (2)
- Czech Republic (5)
- Denmark (15)
- England (12)
- Estonia (2)
- Finland (8)
- France (22)
- Georgia (4)
- Germany (18)
- Greece (12)
- Hungary (17)
- Ireland (9)
- Israel (6)
- Italy (17)
- Kosovo (6)
- Latvia (2)
- Luxembourg (5)
- Macedonia (20)
- Moldova (2)
- Montenegro (9)
- Netherlands (13)
- Northern Ireland (1)
- Norway (4)
- Poland (16)
- Portugal (16)
- Romania (8)
- Russia (17)
- Scotland (3)
- Serbia (24)
- Slovakia (16)
- Slovenia (12)
- Spain (19)
- Sweden (6)
- Switzerland (9)
- Turkey (21)
- Ukraine (17)
- Wales (3)
