= Karate at the 2019 European Games – Men's kumite +84 kg =

Men's kumite +84 kg at the 2019 European Games
- Venue: Čyžoŭka-Arena
- Date: 29 June
- Competitors: 8 from 8 nations

Medalists
gold medal	Asiman Gurbanli	Azerbaijan
silver medal	Anđelo Kvesić	Croatia
bronze medal	Gogita Arkania	Georgia
bronze medal	Jonathan Horne	Germany

The men's kumite +84 kg competition at the 2019 European Games in Minsk was held on 29 June 2019 at the Čyžoŭka-Arena.

== Schedule ==
All times are local (UTC+3).

Date	Time	Event
Saturday, 29 June 2019	12:25	Elimination round
Saturday, 29 June 2019	17:03	Semifinals
Saturday, 29 June 2019	18:41	Final

== Results ==
=== Elimination round ===
==== Group A ====
Rank	Athlete	B	W	D	L	Pts	Score
1	Asiman Gurbanli (AZE)	3	2	1	0	5	3–0
2	Jonathan Horne (GER)	3	1	2	0	4	4–0
3	Alparslan Yamanoğlu (TUR)	3	1	0	2	2	4–7
4	Tyron Lardy (NED)	3	0	1	2	1	2–6

	Score	
Jonathan Horne (GER)	4–0	Alparslan Yamanoğlu (TUR)
Tyron Lardy (NED)	0–2	Asiman Gurbanli (AZE)
Tyron Lardy (NED)	2–4	Alparslan Yamanoğlu (TUR)
Jonathan Horne (GER)	0–0	Asiman Gurbanli (AZE)
Asiman Gurbanli (AZE)	1–0	Alparslan Yamanoğlu (TUR)
Jonathan Horne (GER)	0–0	Tyron Lardy (NED)

==== Group B ====
Rank	Athlete	B	W	D	L	Pts	Score
1	Anđelo Kvesić (CRO)	3	2	1	0	5	4–2
2	Gogita Arkania (GEO)	3	1	2	0	4	3–2
3	Slobodan Bitević (SRB)	3	0	2	1	2	0–2
4	Aliaksei Vodchyts (BLR)	3	0	1	2	1	4–5

	Score	
Gogita Arkania (GEO)	3–2	Aliaksei Vodchyts (BLR)
Anđelo Kvesić (CRO)	2–0	Slobodan Bitević (SRB)
Anđelo Kvesić (CRO)	2–2	Aliaksei Vodchyts (BLR)
Gogita Arkania (GEO)	0–0	Slobodan Bitević (SRB)
Slobodan Bitević (SRB)	0–0	Aliaksei Vodchyts (BLR)
Gogita Arkania (GEO)	0–0	Anđelo Kvesić (CRO)

=== Finals ===
Semifinals
Asiman Gurbanli (AZE)	8
Gogita Arkania (GEO)	0
Anđelo Kvesić (CRO)	1
Jonathan Horne (GER)	0

Final
Asiman Gurbanli (AZE)	1
Anđelo Kvesić (CRO)	0
