= Karate at the 2015 European Games – Women's kumite +68 kg =

Karate competition

Women's kumite +68 kg at the 2015 European Games
- Venue: Baku Crystal Hall
- Date: 14 June
- Competitors: 8 from 8 nations

Medalists
gold medal	Maša Martinović	Croatia
silver medal	Meltem Hocaoğlu	Turkey
bronze medal	Ivanna Zaytseva	Russia

The Women's kumite +68 kg competition at the 2015 European Games in Baku, Azerbaijan was held on 14 June 2015 at the Crystal Hall.

== Schedule ==
All times are Azerbaijan Summer Time (UTC+5).

Date	Time	Event
Sunday, 14 June 2015	10:00	Elimination Round
Sunday, 14 June 2015	15:30	Semifinals
Sunday, 14 June 2015	17:00	Finals

== Results ==
Legend

- KK — Forfeit (Kiken)

=== Elimination round ===
==== Group A ====
Athlete	Pld	W	D	L	Points		
Athlete	Pld	W	D	L	GF	GA	Diff
Maša Martinović (CRO)	3	3	0	0	12	4	+8
Hana Antunovic (SWE)	3	1	1	1	11	4	+7
Nadège Ait-Ibrahim (FRA)	3	1	1	1	8	9	-1
Aytan Samadli (AZE)	3	0	0	3	2	16	-14

	Score	
Maša Martinović (CRO)	2-1	Aytan Samadli (AZE)
Nadège Ait-Ibrahim (FRA)	1–1	Hana Antunovic (SWE)
Maša Martinović (CRO)	2-1	Hana Antunovic (SWE)
Nadège Ait-Ibrahim (FRA)	5–0	Aytan Samadli (AZE)
Aytan Samadli (AZE)	1-9	Hana Antunovic (SWE)
Maša Martinović (CRO)	8-2	Nadège Ait-Ibrahim (FRA)

==== Group B ====
Athlete	Pld	W	D	L	Points		
Athlete	Pld	W	D	L	GF	GA	Diff
Meltem Hocaoğlu (TUR)	3	2	1	0	6	1	+5
Ivanna Zaytseva (RUS)	3	1	2	0	2	1	+1
Borislava Ganeva (BUL)	3	1	0	2	4	7	-3
Helena Kuusisto (FIN)	3	0	1	2	0	3	-3

	Score	
Meltem Hocaoğlu (TUR)	5–0	Borislava Ganeva (BUL)
Helena Kuusisto (FIN)	0-0	Ivanna Zaytseva (RUS)
Meltem Hocaoğlu (TUR)	0-0	Ivanna Zaytseva (RUS)
Helena Kuusisto (FIN)	0-2	Borislava Ganeva (BUL)
Borislava Ganeva (BUL)	1-2	Ivanna Zaytseva (RUS)
Meltem Hocaoğlu (TUR)	1-0	Helena Kuusisto (FIN)

== Finals ==
Semifinals
Maša Martinović (CRO)	5
Ivanna Zaytseva (RUS)	2
Hana Antunovic (SWE)	2
Meltem Hocaoğlu (TUR)	3

Gold medal match
Maša Martinović (CRO)	5
Meltem Hocaoğlu (TUR)	0
Bronze medal match
Ivanna Zaytseva (RUS)	2
Hana Antunovic (SWE)	1
