= 2021 World Karate Championships – Men's team kumite =

World Karate Championship

Men's team kumite at the 2021 World Karate Championships
- Venue: Hamdan Sports Complex
- Location: Dubai, United Arab Emirates
- Dates: 18–21 November
- Nations: 46
- Teams: 46

Medalists
gold medal	Daniele De Vivo; Gianluca De Vivo; Ahmed El Sharaby; Luca Maresca; Simone Marino; Michele Martina; Lolrenzo Pietromarchi	Italy
silver medal	Slobodan Bitević; Vladimir Brezančić; Stefan Joksić; Ljubiša Marić; Ðorđe Salapura; Ðorđe Tešanović; Bogdan Trikoš	Serbia
bronze medal	Nurkanat Azhikanov; Igor Chikhmarev; Abylay Toltay; Nurniyaz Yeldashov; Spandiyar Yerkebek; Daniyar Yuldashev; Beibarys Zhangbyr	Kazakhstan
bronze medal	Panah Abdullayev; Tural Aghalarzade; Rafael Aghayev; Tural Alakbarli; Asiman Gurbanli; Rafiz Hasanov; Turgut Hasanov	Azerbaijan

The Men's team kumite competition at the 2021 World Karate Championships was held from 18 to 21 November 2021.

== Results ==
=== Finals ===
Semifinals
Italy	2
Turkey	2
Serbia	3
Uzbekistan	2

Final
Italy	3
Serbia	0

=== Repechage ===
Repechage 1
Brazil	1
Kosovo	3

Repechage 2
Kosovo	0
Kazakhstan	3

Bronze medal
Kazakhstan	3
Turkey	1

Repechage 1
Switzerland	0
North Macedonia	3

Repechage 2
North Macedonia	0
Azerbaijan	3

Bronze medal
Azerbaijan	3
Uzbekistan	2

=== Top half ===
==== Section 1 ====
First round
Kazakhstan	3
Bosnia and Herzegovina	1
Saudi Arabia	3
Belgium	0
South Africa	0
Kosovo	3
Brazil	3
United States	1

Second round
Kazakhstan	3
Morocco	2
Saudi Arabia	3
Ecuador	0
Kosovo	3
Chile	1
Brazil	1
Italy	3

Third round
Kazakhstan	3
Saudi Arabia	1
Kosovo	0
Italy	3

Quarterfinals
Kazakhstan	2
Italy	2

==== Section 2 ====
First round
Spain	3
South Korea	1
Ireland	0
Chinese Taipei	3
France	3
Kenya	0

Second round
Spain	2
Jordan	1
Chinese Taipei	3
Bulgaria	2
France	0
Egypt	3
Mexico	0
Turkey	3

Third round
Spain	3
Chinese Taipei	2
Egypt	2
Turkey	3

Quarterfinals
Spain	1
Turkey	3

=== Bottom half ===
==== Section 3 ====
First round
Switzerland	3
Belarus	1
Germany	2
Cyprus	2
Croatia	2
Azerbaijan	2
Hungary	0
Canada	0

Second round
Switzerland	0
Serbia	3
Germany	0
North Macedonia	3
Azerbaijan	3
India	0
Hungary	1
Japan	3

Third round
Serbia	3
North Macedonia	1
Azerbaijan	3
Japan	0

Quarterfinals
Serbia	3
Azerbaijan	1

==== Section 4 ====
First round
Kuwait	1
Romania	3
Slovakia	0
Algeria	3
Turkmenistan	0
Greece	3

Second round
Romania	1
Denmark	2
Algeria	1
Uzbekistan	3
Greece	2
Ukraine	2
RKF	3
Colombia	0

Third round
Denmark	0
Uzbekistan	3
Ukraine	3
RKF	0

Quarterfinals
Uzbekistan	3
Ukraine	0
