= Gogita Arkania =

Georgian karateka (born 1984)

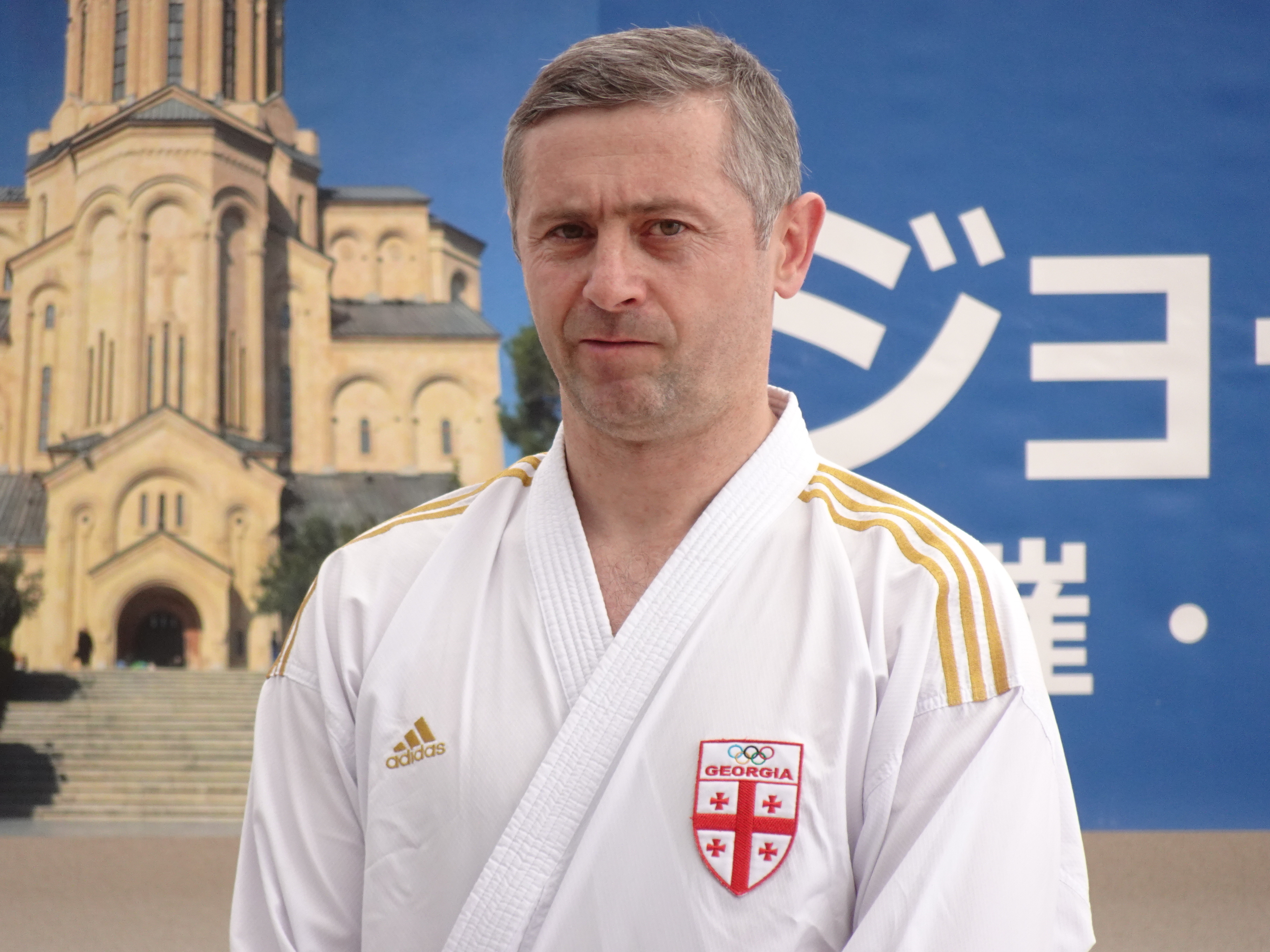
- Arkania in 2024

Personal information
- Born: 26 May 1984 (age 42)

Sport
- Country: Georgia
- Sport: Karate
- Weight class: +84 kg
- Event: Kumite
Medal record
Men's karate
Representing Georgia
World Championships
Gold medal – first place	2014 Bremen	Kumite 84 kg
Gold medal – first place	2021 Dubai	Kumite +84 kg
Bronze medal – third place	2008 Tokyo	Kumite open
European Games
Bronze medal – third place	2019 Minsk	Kumite +84 kg
Bronze medal – third place	2023 Kraków-Małopolska	Kumite +84 kg
European Championships
Bronze medal – third place	2005 San Cristóbal de La Laguna	Kumite 80 kg
Bronze medal – third place	2013 Budapest	Kumite 84 kg
Bronze medal – third place	2018 Novi Sad	Kumite +84 kg
Bronze medal – third place	2022 Gaziantep	Kumite +84 kg

Gogita Arkania (born 26 May 1984) is a Georgian karateka. He is a two-time gold medalist at the World Karate Championships (2014 and 2021). He also represented Georgia at the 2020 Summer Olympics in Tokyo, Japan.

== Career ==
Arkania won the gold medal in the men's kumite 84 kg event at the 2014 World Karate Championships in Bremen, Germany. He defeated Ryutaro Araga of Japan in his gold medal match.

In 2017, Arkania competed in the men's kumite 84 kg event at the World Games held in Wrocław, Poland. He lost two out of three matches in the elimination round and he did not advance to the semi-finals.

At the 2019 European Games held in Minsk, Belarus, he won one of the bronze medals in the men's +84 kg event. He won his bronze medal after losing in the semifinals to eventual gold medalist Asiman Gurbanli of Azerbaijan.

In 2021, Arkania qualified at the World Olympic Qualification Tournament held in Paris, France to compete at the 2020 Summer Olympics in Tokyo, Japan. In August 2021, he competed in the men's +75 kg event at the Olympics. He was also the flag bearer for Georgia during the closing ceremony. In November 2021, he won the gold medal in the men's +84 kg event at the World Karate Championships held in Dubai, United Arab Emirates. He defeated Simone Marino of Italy in his gold medal match.

Arkania won one of the bronze medals in men's +84 kg event at the 2023 European Games held in Poland.

== Achievements ==
Year	Competition	Venue	Rank	Event
2005	European Championships	San Cristóbal de La Laguna, Spain	3rd	Kumite 80 kg
2008	World Championships	Tokyo, Japan	3rd	Kumite open
2014	World Championships	Bremen, Germany	1st	Kumite 84 kg
2018	European Championships	Novi Sad, Serbia	3rd	Kumite +84 kg
2019	European Games	Minsk, Belarus	3rd	Kumite +84 kg
2021	World Championships	Dubai, United Arab Emirates	1st	Kumite +84 kg
2022	European Championships	Gaziantep, Turkey	3rd	Kumite +84 kg
2023	European Games	Kraków and Małopolska, Poland	3rd	Kumite +84 kg
