= Karate at the 2022 Asian Games – Men's kumite 84 kg =

Men's kumite 84 kg at the 2022 Asian Games
- Venue: Linping Sports Centre Gymnasium
- Date: 7 October 2023
- Competitors: 15 from 15 nations

Medalists
gold medal	Arif Afifuddin	Malaysia
silver medal	Daniyar Yuldashev	Kazakhstan
bronze medal	Đỗ Thành Nhân	Vietnam
bronze medal	Mohammad Al-Jafari	Jordan

The men's kumite 84 kilograms competition at the 2022 Asian Games took place on 7 October 2023 at the Linping Sports Centre Gymnasium, Hangzhou.

== Schedule ==
All times are China Standard Time (UTC+08:00)

Date	Time	Event
Saturday, 7 October 2023	08:30	Round of 16
Saturday, 7 October 2023	08:30	Quarterfinals
Saturday, 7 October 2023	08:30	Semifinals
Saturday, 7 October 2023	08:30	Repechages
Saturday, 7 October 2023	14:00	Finals

== Results ==
Legend

- H — Won by hansoku (8–0)

=== Main bracket ===
Round of 16
Ehsan Amin Fazli (AFG)	3
Baek Jun-hyeok (KOR)	6
Abdulla Babikr (QAT)	1
Sandy Firmansyah (INA)	6
Đỗ Thành Nhân (VIE)	0
Arif Afifuddin (MAS)	2
Daniyar Yuldashev (KAZ)	6
Teerapat Kanabkaew (THA)	2
Sreang Virak (CAM)	6
Wu Chun-wei (TPE)	7
Mehdi Khodabakhshi (IRI)	4
Daiki Ando (JPN)	5
Faraj Al-Nashri (KSA)	1
Mohammad Al-Jafari (JOR)	5

Quarterfinals
Asadbek Fotoev (TJK)	0
Baek Jun-hyeok (KOR)	0
Sandy Firmansyah (INA)	3
Arif Afifuddin (MAS)	4
Daniyar Yuldashev (KAZ)	7
Wu Chun-wei (TPE)	4
Daiki Ando (JPN)	0
Mohammad Al-Jafari (JOR)	6

Semifinals
Baek Jun-hyeok (KOR)	2
Arif Afifuddin (MAS)	5
Daniyar Yuldashev (KAZ)	3^{H}
Mohammad Al-Jafari (JOR)	3

Gold medal contest
Arif Afifuddin (MAS)	10
Daniyar Yuldashev (KAZ)	4

=== Repechage ===
Repechage round 1
Đỗ Thành Nhân (VIE)	10
Sandy Firmansyah (INA)	2
Teerapat Kanabkaew (THA)	1
Wu Chun-wei (TPE)	9

Bronze medal bouts
Đỗ Thành Nhân (VIE)	9
Baek Jun-hyeok (KOR)	3
Wu Chun-wei (TPE)	5
Mohammad Al-Jafari (JOR)	15
