= Daniyar Yuldashev =

Kazakhstani karateka (born 1996)

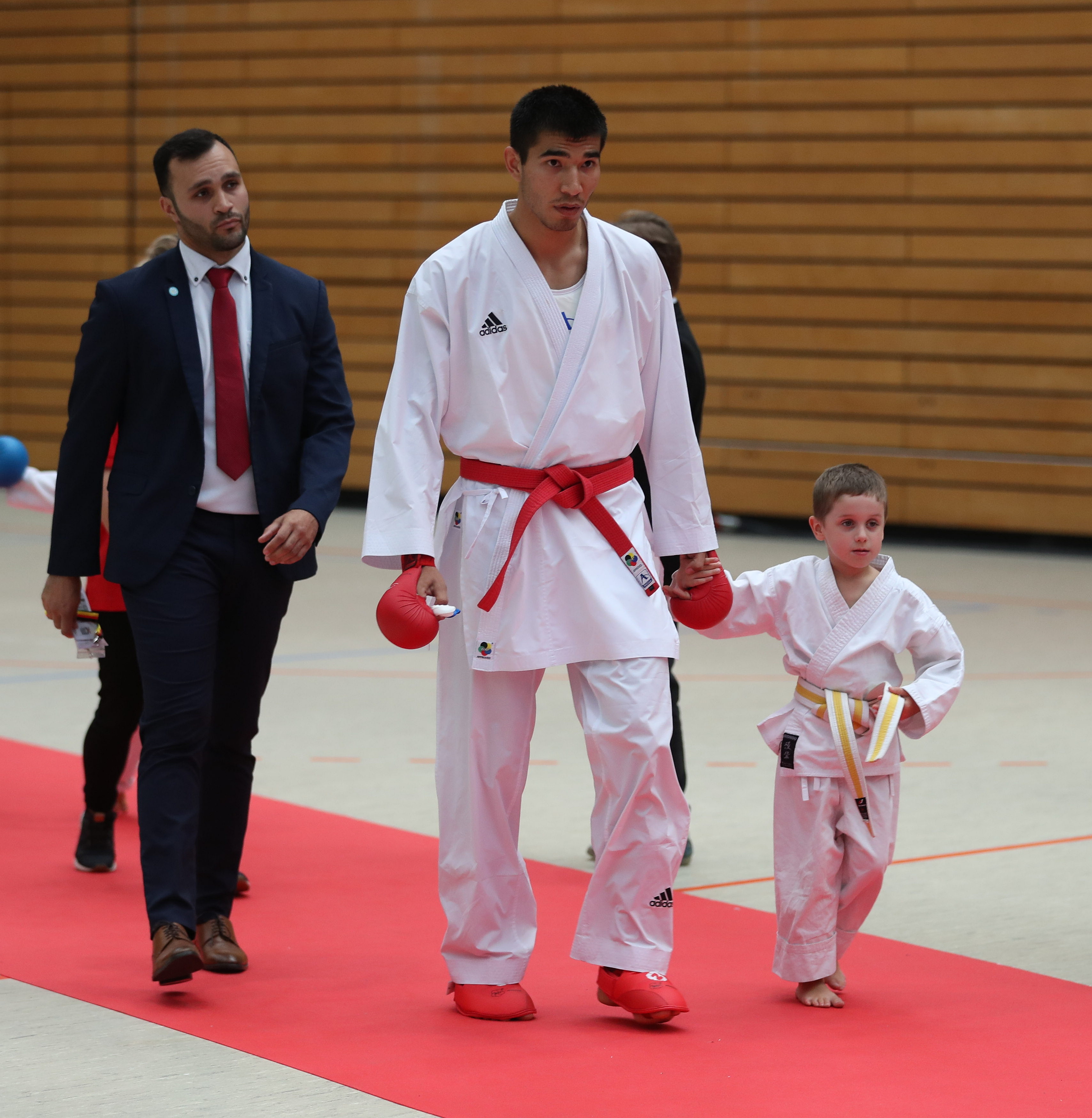
- Daniyar Yuldashev in 2018

Personal information
- Born: 3 September 1996 (age 29)

Sport
- Country: Kazakhstan
- Sport: Karate
- Weight class: 84 kg
- Events: Kumite; Team kumite
Medal record
Men's karate
Representing Kazakhstan
World Championships
Bronze medal – third place	2021 Dubai	Team kumite
Asian Games
Silver medal – second place	2022 Hangzhou	Kumite 84 kg
Bronze medal – third place	2018 Jakarta	Kumite +84 kg
Asian Championships
Gold medal – first place	2021 Almaty	Team kumite
Silver medal – second place	2017 Astana	Kumite 84 kg
Silver medal – second place	2022 Tashkent	Team kumite
Silver medal – second place	2023 Malacca	Team kumite
Bronze medal – third place	2017 Astana	Team kumite
Bronze medal – third place	2023 Malacca	Kumite 84 kg
Bronze medal – third place	2025 Tashkent	Kumite 84 kg
Bronze medal – third place	2025 Tashkent	Team kumite

Daniyar Yuldashev (Данияр Рустамбекович Юлдашев, born 3 September 1996) is a Kazakhstani karateka. He won the silver medal in the men's kumite 84 kg event at the 2022 Asian Games in Hangzhou, China. He is also a three-time medalist in his event at the Asian Karate Championships.

Yuldashev represented Kazakhstan at the 2020 Summer Olympics in Tokyo, Japan. He competed in the men's +75 kg event.

== Career ==
At the 2017 Asian Karate Championships held in Astana, Kazakhstan, Yuldashev won the silver medal in the men's kumite 84 kg event. In the final, he lost against Masaya Ishizuka of Japan. He won one of the bronze medals in the men's kumite +84 kg event at the 2018 Asian Games held in Jakarta, Indonesia.

In June 2021, Yuldashev competed at the World Olympic Qualification Tournament held in Paris, France hoping to qualify for the 2020 Summer Olympics in Tokyo, Japan. He did not qualify at this tournament but he was able to qualify via continental representation soon after. He competed in the men's +75 kg event at the 2020 Summer Olympics where he lost each of his three matches and he did not advance to compete in the semifinals.

In November 2021, Yuldashev competed in the men's +84 kg event at the World Karate Championships held in Dubai, United Arab Emirates. A month later, he won the gold medal in the men's team kumite event at the Asian Karate Championships held in Almaty, Kazakhstan. He won the silver medal in this event at the 2022 Asian Karate Championships held in Tashkent, Uzbekistan.

In 2023, he won the silver medal in the men's kumite 84 kg event at the 2022 Asian Games held in Hangzhou, China.

== Achievements ==
Year	Competition	Venue	Rank	Event
2017	Asian Championships	Astana, Kazakhstan	2nd	Kumite 84 kg
2017	Asian Championships	Astana, Kazakhstan	3rd	Team kumite
2018	Asian Games	Jakarta, Indonesia	3rd	Kumite +84 kg
2021	World Championships	Dubai, United Arab Emirates	3rd	Team kumite
2021	Asian Championships	Almaty, Kazakhstan	1st	Team kumite
2022	Asian Championships	Tashkent, Uzbekistan	2nd	Team kumite
2023	Asian Championships	Malacca, Malaysia	3rd	Kumite 84 kg
2023	Asian Championships	Malacca, Malaysia	2nd	Team kumite
2023	Asian Games	Hangzhou, China	2nd	Kumite 84 kg
2025	Asian Championships	Tashkent, Uzbekistan	3rd	Kumite 84 kg
2025	Asian Championships	Tashkent, Uzbekistan	3rd	Team kumite
