= 2017 European Karate Championships =

Karate competition

- Location: İzmit, Turkey
- Dates: 4–7 May
- Competitors: 490 from 43 nations

The 2017 European Karate Championships, the 52nd edition, was held in İzmit, Turkey from 4 to 7 May 2017. A total of 490 competitors from 43 countries participated at the event.

== Medal table ==
* Host nation (Turkey)

| Rank | Nation | Gold | Silver | Bronze | Total |
|---|---|---|---|---|---|
| 1 | Turkey* | 4 | 4 | 6 | 14 |
| 2 | Italy | 3 | 3 | 2 | 8 |
| 3 | Spain | 3 | 0 | 2 | 5 |
| 4 | Ukraine | 2 | 1 | 3 | 6 |
| 5 | France | 1 | 4 | 3 | 8 |
| 6 | Serbia | 1 | 1 | 2 | 4 |
| 7 | Austria | 1 | 0 | 1 | 2 |
| 8 | Latvia | 1 | 0 | 0 | 1 |
| 9 | Russia | 0 | 1 | 3 | 4 |
| 10 | North Macedonia | 0 | 1 | 1 | 2 |
| 11 | Germany | 0 | 1 | 0 | 1 |
| 12 | Azerbaijan | 0 | 0 | 2 | 2 |
| 12 | Slovakia | 0 | 0 | 2 | 2 |
| 14 | Croatia | 0 | 0 | 1 | 1 |
| 14 | Hungary | 0 | 0 | 1 | 1 |
| 14 | Montenegro | 0 | 0 | 1 | 1 |
| 14 | Netherlands | 0 | 0 | 1 | 1 |
| 14 | Sweden | 0 | 0 | 1 | 1 |
| Totals (18 entries) | | 16 | 16 | 32 | 64 |

== Medalists ==
=== Men's competition ===
==== Individual ====
| Event | Gold | Silver | Bronze |
|---|---|---|---|
| Kata | (Spain) Damián Quintero | (Turkey) Ali Sofuoğlu | (Italy) Mattia Busato |
| Kata | (Spain) Damián Quintero | (Turkey) Ali Sofuoğlu | (Azerbaijan) Roman Heydarov |
| Kumite –60 kg | (Latvia) Kalvis Kalniņš | (Serbia) Marko Antić | (Slovakia) Dominik Imrich |
| Kumite –60 kg | (Latvia) Kalvis Kalniņš | (Serbia) Marko Antić | (Italy) Angelo Crescenzo |
| Kumite –67 kg | (Turkey) Burak Uygur | (Russia) Alexandr Gutnik | (Spain) Carlos León |
| Kumite –67 kg | (Turkey) Burak Uygur | (Russia) Alexandr Gutnik | (Montenegro) Mario Hodžić |
| Kumite –75 kg | (Italy) Luigi Busà | (Ukraine) Stanislav Horuna | (Turkey) Erman Eltemur |
| Kumite –75 kg | (Italy) Luigi Busà | (Ukraine) Stanislav Horuna | (Hungary) Gábor Hárspataki |
| Kumite –84 kg | (Turkey) Uğur Aktaş | (North Macedonia) Berat Jakupi | (Russia) Denis Denisenko |
| Kumite –84 kg | (Turkey) Uğur Aktaş | (North Macedonia) Berat Jakupi | (Netherlands) Timothy Petersen |
| Kumite +84 kg | (Italy) Simone Marino | (Turkey) Enes Erkan | (Serbia) Slobodan Bitević |
| Kumite +84 kg | (Italy) Simone Marino | (Turkey) Enes Erkan | (Azerbaijan) Shahin Atamov |

==== Team ====
| Event | Gold | Silver | Bronze |
|---|---|---|---|
| Kata | Spain; José Carbonell; Sergio Galán; Francisco Salazar | Italy; Mattia Busato; Alessandro Iodice; Alfredo Tocco | Russia; Maksim Ksenofontov; Mehman Rzaev; Emil Skovorodnikov |
| Kata | Spain; José Carbonell; Sergio Galán; Francisco Salazar | Italy; Mattia Busato; Alessandro Iodice; Alfredo Tocco | France; Lucas Jeannot; Enzo Montarello; Ahmed Zemouri |
| Kumite | Turkey; Uğur Aktaş; Enes Erkan; Gökhan Gündüz; Rıdvan Kaptan; Serkan Yağcı; Alparslan Yamanoğlu; Muhammet Ali Yılmaz | France; Julien Caffaro; Jessie Da Costa; Logan Da Costa; Steven Da Costa; Marvin Garin; Kenji Grillon; Corentin Séguy | Croatia; Enes Garibović; Anđelo Kvesić; Ivan Kvesić; Ivan Martinac; Ante Mrvičić; Alan Šurbek; Zvonimir Živković |
| Kumite | Turkey; Uğur Aktaş; Enes Erkan; Gökhan Gündüz; Rıdvan Kaptan; Serkan Yağcı; Alparslan Yamanoğlu; Muhammet Ali Yılmaz | France; Julien Caffaro; Jessie Da Costa; Logan Da Costa; Steven Da Costa; Marvin Garin; Kenji Grillon; Corentin Séguy | Ukraine; Valerii Chobotar; Stanislav Horuna; Yaroslav Horuna; Andriy Toroshanko; Kostiantyn Tsymbal; Ihor Uhnich |

=== Women's competition ===
==== Individual ====
| Event | Gold | Silver | Bronze |
|---|---|---|---|
| Kata | (Spain) Sandra Sánchez | (Italy) Viviana Bottaro | (France) Sandy Scordo |
| Kata | (Spain) Sandra Sánchez | (Italy) Viviana Bottaro | (Turkey) Dilara Bozan |
| Kumite –50 kg | (Ukraine) Kateryna Kryva | (Germany) Duygu Bugur | (Turkey) Serap Özçelik |
| Kumite –50 kg | (Ukraine) Kateryna Kryva | (Germany) Duygu Bugur | (Austria) Bettina Plank |
| Kumite –55 kg | (Turkey) Tuba Yakan | (Italy) Sara Cardin | (Ukraine) Anzhelika Terliuga |
| Kumite –55 kg | (Turkey) Tuba Yakan | (Italy) Sara Cardin | (North Macedonia) Jovana Georgieva |
| Kumite –61 kg | (Serbia) Jovana Preković | (France) Lucie Ignace | (Turkey) Merve Çoban |
| Kumite –61 kg | (Serbia) Jovana Preković | (France) Lucie Ignace | (Ukraine) Anita Serogina |
| Kumite –68 kg | (Austria) Alisa Buchinger | (France) Alizée Agier | (Serbia) Sanja Cvrkota |
| Kumite –68 kg | (Austria) Alisa Buchinger | (France) Alizée Agier | (Turkey) Hafsa Şeyda Burucu |
| Kumite +68 kg | (France) Anne-Laure Florentin | (Turkey) Meltem Hocaoğlu | (Sweden) Hana Antunovic |
| Kumite +68 kg | (France) Anne-Laure Florentin | (Turkey) Meltem Hocaoğlu | (Russia) Ivanna Zaytseva |

==== Team ====
| Event | Gold | Silver | Bronze |
|---|---|---|---|
| Kata | Italy; Sara Battaglia; Viviana Bottaro; Michela Pezzetti | France; Lila Bui; Marie Bui; Sandy Scordo | Turkey; Dilara Bozan; Rabia Küsmüş; Gizem Şahin |
| Kata | Italy; Sara Battaglia; Viviana Bottaro; Michela Pezzetti | France; Lila Bui; Marie Bui; Sandy Scordo | Spain; Gema Morales; Margarita Morata; Paula Rodríguez |
| Kumite | Ukraine; Kateryna Kryva; Anastasiia Miastkovska; Anita Serogina; Anzhelika Terliuga | Turkey; Mücessem Buse Avcu; Merve Çoban; Serap Özçelik; Tuba Yakan | Slovakia; Veronika Semaníková; Ingrida Suchánková; Dominika Tatárová; Jana Vojtikevičová |
| Kumite | Ukraine; Kateryna Kryva; Anastasiia Miastkovska; Anita Serogina; Anzhelika Terliuga | Turkey; Mücessem Buse Avcu; Merve Çoban; Serap Özçelik; Tuba Yakan | France; Alizée Agier; Leïla Heurtault; Lucie Ignace; Alexandra Recchia |

== Participating countries ==
- Albania (2)
- Austria (11)
- Azerbaijan (17)
- Belarus (14)
- Belgium (12)
- Bosnia and Herzegovina (17)
- Bulgaria (3)
- Croatia (21)
- Czech Republic (7)
- Denmark (6)
- England (21)
- Estonia (2)
- Finland (5)
- France (21)
- Georgia (7)
- Germany (15)
- Greece (13)
- Hungary (13)
- Israel (8)
- Italy (22)
- Kosovo (12)
- Latvia (6)
- Luxembourg (2)
- Macedonia (16)
- Malta (1)
- Moldova (4)
- Montenegro (17)
- Netherlands (13)
- Norway (2)
- Poland (10)
- Portugal (19)
- Romania (3)
- Russia (22)
- Scotland (5)
- Serbia (24)
- Slovakia (16)
- Slovenia (8)
- Spain (21)
- Sweden (5)
- Switzerland (7)
- Turkey (23)
- Ukraine (15)
- Wales (2)
