= Babacar Seck (karateka) =

Spanish karateka (born 1998)

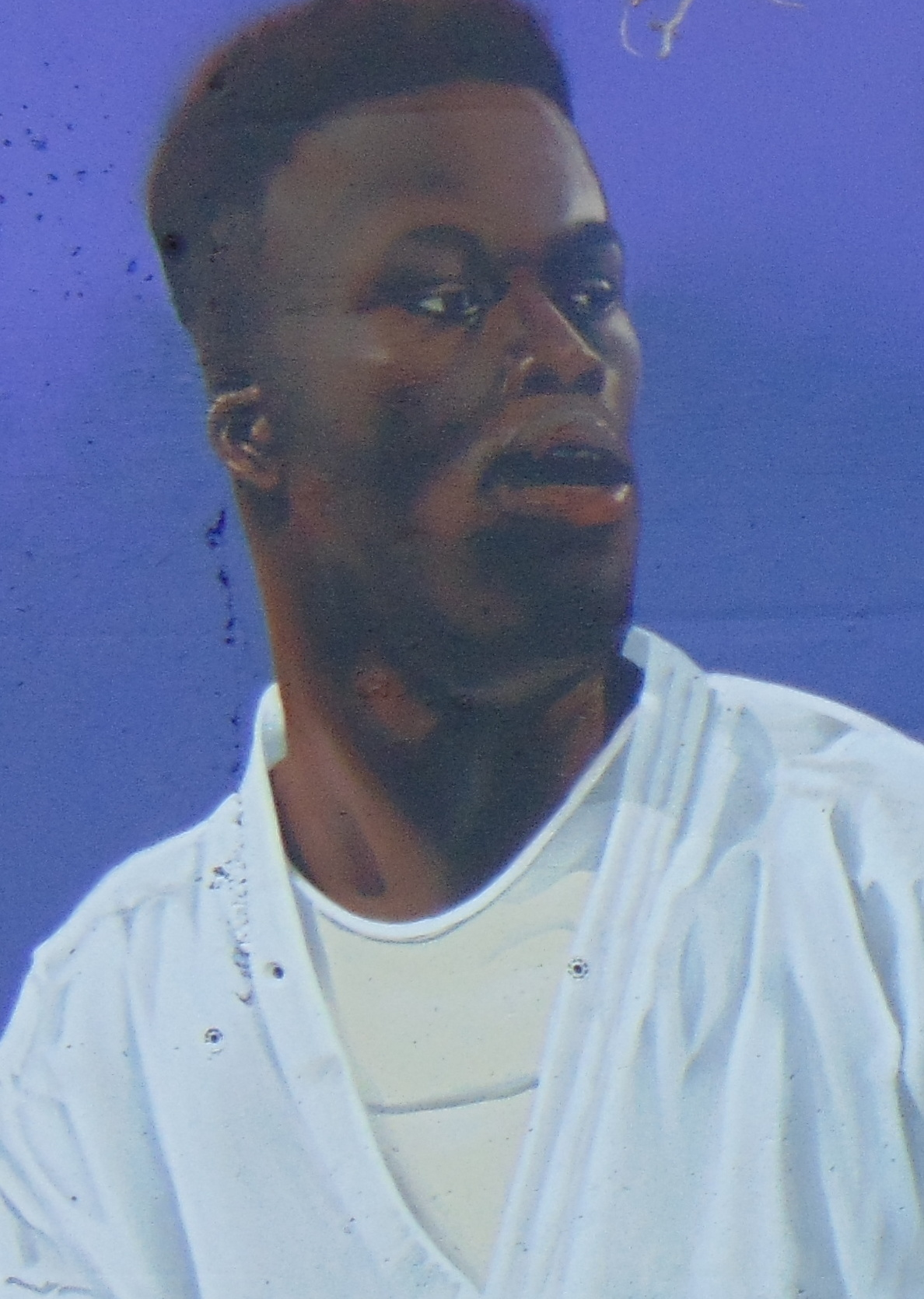

Personal information
- Full name: Babacar Seck Sakho
- Born: 12 June 1998 (age 28)

Sport
- Country: Spain
- Sport: Karate
- Weight class: +84 kg
- Events: Kumite; Team kumite
Medal record
Men's karate
Representing Spain
World Championships
Bronze medal – third place	2018 Madrid	Kumite +84 kg
World Games
Gold medal – first place	2022 Birmingham	Kumite +84 kg
European Championships
Silver medal – second place	2018 Novi Sad	Team kumite
Bronze medal – third place	2019 Guadalajara	Team kumite
Bronze medal – third place	2023 Guadalajara	Kumite +84 kg

Babacar Seck Sakho (born 12 June 1998) is a Spanish karateka. He won the gold medal in the men's kumite +84 kg event at the 2022 World Games held in Birmingham, United States.

== Career ==
He won one of the bronze medals in the men's kumite +84 kg event at the 2018 World Karate Championships held in Madrid, Spain.

At the 2018 European Karate Championships held in Novi Sad, Serbia, he finished in 5th place in the men's kumite +84 kg event. In 2021, he lost his bronze medal match in the men's +84 kg event at the World Karate Championships held in Dubai, United Arab Emirates.

He competed in the men's +84 kg event at the 2022 Mediterranean Games held in Oran, Algeria where he was eliminated in his first match. He won the gold medal in the men's +84 kg event at the 2022 World Games held in Birmingham, United States.

He won one of the bronze medals in the men's +84 kg event at the 2023 European Karate Championships held in Guadalajara, Spain. He competed in the men's kumite +84 kg event at the 2023 European Games held in Poland.

== Personal life ==
Born in Senegal, he emigrated to Spain at the age of 11 and settled in Zaragoza.

== Achievements ==
Year	Competition	Location	Rank	Event
2018	European Championships	Novi Sad, Serbia	2nd	Team kumite
2018	World Championships	Madrid, Spain	3rd	Kumite +84 kg
	Continental Championship	Aalborg, Denmark	2nd	Kumite +84 kg
2019	European Championships	Guadalajara, Spain	3rd	Kumite +84 kg
2022	World Games	Birmingham, United States	1st	Kumite +84 kg
2022	Karate1 Premier League	Rabat, Moroco	2nd	Kumite +84 kg
2022	Karate1 Premier League	Matosinhos, Portugal	1st	Kumite +84 kg
2022	Karate1 Premier League	Fujairah, The United Arab Emirates	3rd	Kumite +84 kg
2023	European Championships	Guadalajara, Spain	3rd	Kumite +84 kg
2023	Karate1 Premier League	Fukuoka, Japan	2nd	Kumite +84 kg
2023	Karate1 Premier League	Dublin, Ireland	3rd	Kumite +84 kg
2023	Karate1 Premier League	Cairo, Egypt	2nd	Kumite +84 kg
2024	Spanish National Karate League	Santander, Spain	1st	Kumite +84 kg
2025	Spanish Team Championships	Madrid, Spain	1st	Team kumite
