= Hazem Ahmed =

Egyptian karateka (born 2002)

Personal information
- Native name: حازم أحمد سعيد
- Full name: Hazem Ahmed Said Ibrahim Mohamed
- Other names: Hazem Mohamed
- Nationality: Egyptian
- Born: September 17, 2002 (age 24) Alexandria, Egypt
- Height: 182 cm (5 ft 11 1/2 in)
- Weight: 90 kg (200 lb)

Sport
- Country: Egypt
- Sport: Karate
- Weight class: Men's Kumite +84 kg
- Club: Ipswich Karate Club (2025–present)
Medal record
Representing (Egypt)
Men's karate
WKF World Cadet, Junior & U21 Championships
Gold medal – first place	2019 Santiago	Kumite +76 kg (Junior)
African Youth Championships
Gold medal – first place	2019 Botswana	Kumite +76 kg
Gold medal – first place	2020 Morocco	Kumite +76 kg
Arab Youth Championships
Gold medal – first place	2019 Tunisia	Kumite +76 kg
Karate1 Premier League
Gold medal – first place	2022 Fujairah	Kumite +84 kg
Silver medal – second place	2021 Cairo	Kumite +84 kg
Bronze medal – third place	2022 Rabat	Kumite +84 kg
Bronze medal – third place	2024 Cairo	Kumite +84 kg
African Team Championships
Gold medal – first place	2021 Cairo	Team kumite
US Open
Silver medal – second place	2024 Texas	Kumite +84 kg (individual)
Gold medal – first place	2024 Texas	Kumite (team)
USA National Karate Championships
Gold medal – first place	2026 Washington	Kumite +75 kg

Hazem Ahmed Said Ibrahim Mohamed, who also competed under the name Hazem Mohamed (born 17 September 2002 in Alexandria, Egypt) is an Egyptian karate athlete who competes internationally in the men's kumite +84 kg division. Hazem has been a member of the Egyptian national karate team since 2016. He won gold at the 2019 WKF World Cadet, Junior and U21 Karate Championships in Santiago, Chile, in the junior kumite +76 kg category, a result that helped Egypt top the overall medal table at that championship. He has also competed professionally for clubs in the United Arab Emirates, Saudi Arabia, and England, and has worked as a coach and technical companion for athletes from the United States national team.

== Early life and education ==
Hazem was born in Alexandria on September 17, 2002, and began practicing karate at the age of four. He started his career at Al-Nahas Company Club, then moved to Al-Suyuf Club, before joining Smouha Sporting Club in 2012, which he has represented in various local and international competitions ever since. During 2024 and 2025, he played on loan for the National Bank of Egypt Club.

Hazem graduated from the Faculty of Pharmacy at the Arab Academy for Science, Technology and Maritime Transport in 2026.

== Sporting career ==
In 2014, Hazem won the gold medal at the Dubai Open. He won bronze at the 2015 edition before securing another gold medal in 2016.

In the junior category, Hazem won a bronze medal in the kumite +70 kg event at the 2017 Mediterranean Cadet Championships in Morocco. The following year, he won gold in the kumite +76 kg event at the Karate1 Youth League tournament in Italy.

In 2019, Hazem achieved several notable results at the junior level, winning a silver medal at the UFAK (North Africa) Junior Championship in Morocco, followed by gold medals at the Arab Youth Championship in Tunisia and the African Youth Championship in Botswana.

In the 2019 WKF World Cadet, Junior and U21 Karate Championships in Santiago, Chile, Hazem won gold in the junior +76 kg kumite event, contributing to Egypt's first-place finish in the overall medal table. In 2020, he won another gold medal at the African Youth Championship in Morocco.

After moving to the senior +84 kg division, Hazem recorded several podium finishes in the WKF Karate1 Premier League. He won silver in Cairo in 2021, and finished fifth in Moscow later that year, In 2022, he won gold in Fujairah, United Arab Emirates, followed by a bronze medal in Rabat, Morocco, and another bronze in Cairo in 2024 after defeating Algeria's representative in the bronze-medal bout. In 2021, Hazem won gold as a member of the Egyptian men's team at the African Team Kumite Championship in Egypt. In 2024, Hazem won silver in the individual +84 kg event and gold in the team event at the US Open in Texas. He finished fifth at the Karate1 Premier League in Cairo in 2025 and in Istanbul, Turkey, in early 2026.

In July 2026, Hazem won gold in the +75 kg division at the USA National Karate Championships in Washington state. He defeated Cody Mao 8–0 and Addison Tsutsui 7–2 before beating Vitalii Badalka 2–0 in the final.

He has also won the Egyptian national title in his weight class for fifteen consecutive years, starting in 2012.

== Club career ==
Hazem has competed for several clubs outside Egypt. From 2014 to 2016, he represented Al Ahli Dubai in the United Arab Emirates, winning two gold medals and one bronze at the Dubai Open. In the 2022 and 2023 seasons, he represented Al Ahli Jeddah in Saudi Arabia, where the team finished third at the Sports Minister's Cup. In 2024, he joined Al Ittihad Jeddah, with the team finishing third in the team event at the Sports Minister's Cup after victories over Al Tasamoh and Al Ahli Jeddah. Since 2025, he has competed for Ipswich Karate Club in England.

== Coaching work ==
Hazem has worked as a coach and lecturer at karate training camps, where he has delivered kumite training and lectures on technique and competition tactics. In November 2025, he conducted training sessions and lectures in Ipswich, England, for participants from different age groups and skill levels. In 2026, he conducted coaching sessions in the United States, beginning with a camp in Winter Garden, Florida, attended by around 100 athletes of different ages and skill levels. The camp focused on kumite skills and tactical planning. The coaching sessions continued in California, where Summit Karate Academy in Sunnyvale hosted a camp attended by around 250 athletes, including members of the U.S. national team.

He has also worked as a coach and technical adviser for athletes from the United States national karate team and Summit Karate Academy at Karate1 Youth League tournaments, including events in Venice, Italy, in December 2025 and Fujairah, United Arab Emirates, in February 2026. At the Fujairah tournament, American athlete Rayana Dukhandi won a bronze medal in kumite.

== Honors ==
In 2019, Ahmed was awarded the Order of the Republic, First Class, in Sport by Egyptian President Abdel Fattah el-Sisi in recognition of his international achievements.

== Medal record ==
Year	Competition	Location	Result	Event
2014	Dubai Open	Dubai, UAE	1st	Kumite +40 kg
2015	Dubai Open	Dubai, UAE	3rd	Kumite +50 kg
2016	Dubai Open	Dubai, UAE	1st	Kumite +50 kg
2017	Mediterranean Cadet Championships	Morocco	3rd	Kumite +70 kg
2018	Karate1 Youth League	Italy	1st	Kumite +76 kg
2019	UFAK Junior Championship	Morocco	2nd	Kumite +76 kg
2019	Arab Youth Championship	Tunisia	1st	Kumite +76 kg
2019	Arab Youth Championship	Botswana	1st	Kumite +76 kg
2019	Grand Prix	Istanbul, Turkey	1st	Kumite +76 kg
2019	Grand Prix	Istanbul, Turkey	3rd	Kumite +84 kg
2019	WKF World Cadet, Junior and U21 Championships	Santiago, Chile	1st	Kumite +76 kg
2020	African Youth Championship	Morocco	1st	Kumite +76 kg
2021	African Youth Championship	Cairo, Egypt	1st	Team Kumite (Men)
2021	Karate1 Premier League	Cairo, Egypt	2nd	Kumite +84 kg
2021	Karate1 Premier League	Moscow, Russia	5th	Kumite +84 kg
2022	Karate1 Premier League	Fujairah, UAE	1st	Kumite +84 kg
2022	Karate1 Premier League	Rabat, Morocco	3rd	Kumite +84 kg
2022	UFAK Championship	Tunisia	2nd	Kumite +84 kg
2022	Sports Minister's Cup	Saudi Arabia	3rd	Team Kumite
2023	Sports Minister's Cup	Saudi Arabia	3rd	Team Kumite
2024	Karate1 Premier League	Cairo, Egypt	3rd	Kumite +84 kg
2024	US Open	Texas, United States	2nd	Kumite +84 kg
2024	US Open (Team)	Texas, United States	1st	Team Kumite
2024	Sports Minister's Cup	Saudi Arabia	3rd	Team Kumite
2025	Karate1 Premier League	Cairo, Egypt	5th	Kumite +84 kg
2026	Karate1 Premier League	Istanbul, Turkey	5th	Kumite +84 kg
2026	USA National Karate Championships	Washington, United States	1st	Kumite +75 kg
