= Ivan Klepić =

Bosnian karateka (born 1994)

- Born: 12 October 1994 (age 32); Mostar, Bosnia and Herzegovina
- Style: Shotokan
- Teacher: Miroslav Klepić
- Rank: Black Belt, 4th dan

Ivan Klepić (born 12 October 1994) is a Bosnian karateka.

== Championships ==
- European Championships
  - 2018 European Karate Championships (gold) Kumite +84 kg
