= Karate at the 2023 European Games – Men's kumite +84 kg =

Men's kumite +84 kg at the 2023 European Games
- Venue: Bielsko-Biała Arena
- Date: 23 June
- Competitors: 8 from 8 nations

Medalists
| gold medal | Anđelo Kvesić | Croatia |
| silver medal | Not awarded |
| bronze medal | Asiman Gurbanli | Azerbaijan |
| bronze medal | Gogita Arkania | Georgia |

The men's kumite +84 kg competition at the 2023 European Games was held on 23 June 2023 at the Bielsko-Biała Arena.

== Results ==
=== Elimination round ===
Pool A

| Pos | Athlete | B | W | D | D^{0} | L | Pts | Score | (Croatia) | (Turkey) | (Greece) | (Poland) |
|---|---|---|---|---|---|---|---|---|---|---|---|---|
| 1 | Anđelo Kvesić (CRO) | 3 | 3 | 0 | 0 | 0 | 9 | 13–4 | — | 5–3 | 4–1 | 4–0 |
| 2 | Fatih Şen (TUR) | 3 | 2 | 0 | 0 | 1 | 6 | 14–6 | 3–5 | — | 8–0 | 3–1 |
| 3 | Georgios Tzanos (GRE) | 3 | 1 | 0 | 0 | 2 | 3 | 2–12 | 1–4 | 0–8 | — | 1–0 |
| 4 | Maciej Gębka (POL) | 3 | 0 | 0 | 0 | 3 | 0 | 1–8 | 0–4 | 1–3 | 0–1 | — |

Source: EG2023

Pool B

| Pos | Athlete | B | W | D | D^{0} | L | Pts | Score | (Georgia (country)) | (Azerbaijan) | (Spain) | (Bosnia and Herzegovina) |
|---|---|---|---|---|---|---|---|---|---|---|---|---|
| 1 | Gogita Arkania (GEO) | 3 | 3 | 0 | 0 | 0 | 9 | 19–11 | — | 2–1 | 9–6 | 8–4 |
| 2 | Asiman Gurbanli (AZE) | 3 | 2 | 0 | 0 | 1 | 6 | 16–7 | 1–2 | — | 6–4 | 9–1 |
| 3 | Babacar Seck (ESP) | 3 | 1 | 0 | 0 | 2 | 3 | 15–19 | 6–9 | 4–6 | — | 5–4 |
| 4 | Anes Bostandžić (BIH) | 3 | 0 | 0 | 0 | 3 | 0 | 9–22 | 4–8 | 1–9 | 4–5 | — |

Source: EG2023

=== Finals ===
Semifinals
Asiman Gurbanli (AZE) | 3
Anđelo Kvesić (CRO) | 5
~~Fatih Şen (TUR)~~ | 5
Gogita Arkania (GEO) | 1

Gold medal bout
Anđelo Kvesić (CRO)
~~Fatih Şen (TUR)~~ | DSQ
