= Karate at the 2022 World Games – Men's kumite +84 kg =

Men's kumite +84 kg at the 2022 World Games
- Venue: Bill Battle Coliseum
- Location: Birmingham, United States
- Dates: 9 July
- Competitors: 7 from 7 nations

Medalists
| gold medal | Babacar Seck | Spain |
| silver medal | Anđelo Kvesić | Croatia |
| bronze medal | Taha Tarek | Egypt |

The men's kumite +84 kg competition in karate at the 2022 World Games took place on 9 July 2022 at the Bill Battle Coliseum in Birmingham, United States.

== Results ==
=== Elimination round ===
==== Pool A ====
| Pos | Athlete | B | W | D | L | Pts | Score | (Croatia) | (Egypt) | (United States) | (Australia) |
|---|---|---|---|---|---|---|---|---|---|---|---|
| 1 | Anđelo Kvesić (CRO) | 3 | 2 | 0 | 1 | 4 | 14–5 | — | 5–3 | 0–2 | 9–0 |
| 2 | Taha Tarek (EGY) | 3 | 2 | 0 | 1 | 4 | 12–10 | 3–5 | — | 5–4 | 4–1 |
| 3 | Brian Irr (USA) | 3 | 2 | 0 | 1 | 4 | 9–5 | 2–0 | 4–5 | — | 3–0 |
| 4 | Daniel Tielen (AUS) | 3 | 0 | 0 | 3 | 0 | 1–16 | 0–9 | 1–4 | 0–3 | — |

Source: Birmingham 2022

==== Pool B ====
| Pos | Athlete | B | W | D | L | Pts | Score | (Spain) | (Ukraine) | (Azerbaijan) |
|---|---|---|---|---|---|---|---|---|---|---|
| 1 | Babacar Seck (ESP) | 2 | 2 | 0 | 0 | 4 | 10–4 | — | 2–1 | 8–3 |
| 2 | Ryzvan Talibov (UKR) | 2 | 1 | 0 | 1 | 2 | 5–3 | 1–2 | — | 4–1 |
| 3 | Asiman Gurbanli (AZE) | 2 | 0 | 0 | 2 | 0 | 4–12 | 3–8 | 1–4 | — |

Source: Birmingham 2022

=== Finals ===
Semi-finals
Anđelo Kvesić (CRO) | 7
Ryzvan Talibov (UKR) | 2
Babacar Seck (ESP) | 1
Taha Tarek (EGY) | 1

Gold medal bout
Anđelo Kvesić (CRO) | 0
Babacar Seck (ESP) | 1
Bronze medal bout
Ryzvan Talibov (UKR) | 0
Taha Tarek (EGY) | 2
