= Marko Antić =

Serbian karateka (born 1991)

- Born: 22 June 1991 (age 35); Mladenovac, Serbia, Yugoslavia
- Nationality: Serb
- Division: -60kilogramme (kg)
- Style: Karate Kumite
- Team: Karate Klub "Mladenovac" Mladenovac
- Trainer: Dragoslav Stojković

Marko Antić (born 22 June 1991 in Mladenovac) is a Serbian karate athlete competing in kumite –60 kg division.

== Achievements ==
2017

- Silver European Karate Championships – TUR – kumite -60 kg

2016

- Bronze European Karate Championships – FRA – kumite -60 kg
- Gold Karate1 Premier League – AUT – Kumite -60 kg

2015

- 5TH PLACE European Karate Championships – TUR – kumite -60 kg

2014

- Bronze Balkan Senior Championships – MKD – Kumite -60 kg

2012

- Bronze World Karate Championships – FRA – kumite -60 kg

2011

- 5TH PLACE European Karate Championships – SUI – Kumite -60 kg

2009

- Bronze EKF Junior, Cadet And U21 Championships – FRA – Junior Kumite -61 kg
