= Rabia Küsmüş =

Turkish karateka

Rabia Çelik
Sport
- Country: Turkey
- Sport: Karate
- Event: Team kata
Medal record
Women's karate
Representing Turkey
World Championships
Bronze medal – third place	2016 Linz	Team kata
Bronze medal – third place	2018 Madrid	Team kata
European Championships
Gold medal – first place	2015 Istanbul	Team kata
Bronze medal – third place	2016 Montpellier	Team kata
Bronze medal – third place	2017 İzmit	Team kata
Bronze medal – third place	2018 Novi Sad	Team kata

Rabia Küsmüş is a Turkish karateka. She won one of the bronze medals in the women's team kata event at the 2018 World Karate Championships held in Madrid, Spain. She also won a bronze medal in this event at the 2016 World Karate Championships held in Linz, Austria.

At the 2018 European Karate Championships held in Novi Sad, Serbia, she won one of the bronze medals in the women's team kata event.

== Achievements ==
Year	Competition	Venue	Rank	Event
2015	European Championships	Istanbul, Turkey	1st	Team kata
2016	World Championships	Linz, Austria	3rd	Team kata
2018	World Championships	Madrid, Spain	3rd	Team kata
