= Oleksandr Grevtsov =

Ukrainian karateka (born 1996)

- Born: Гревцов Олександр Олександрович; July 27, 1996 (age 30)
- Nationality: Ukrainian
- Style: Karate Kumite
- Team: "ГО СК ROYAL TEAM", Odesa

Oleksandr Grevtsov (Ukrainian: Гревцов Олександр Олександрович, born July 27, 1996) is a Ukrainian karateka competing in the kumite +84 kg division. He is 2018 European Team Championships medalist.
