= Hana Antunovic =

Swedish karateka

Sport
- Country: Sweden
- Sport: Karate
- Weight class: +68 kg
- Event: Kumite
Medal record
Women's karate
Representing Sweden
World Championships
Bronze medal – third place	2018 Madrid	Kumite +68 kg
European Championships
Bronze medal – third place	2017 Kocaeli	Kumite +68 kg

Hana Antunovic is a Swedish karateka. She won one of the bronze medals in the women's kumite +68 kg event at the 2018 World Karate Championships held in Madrid, Spain.

In 2015, Antunovic lost her bronze medal match in the women's kumite +68 kg event at the European Games held in Baku, Azerbaijan. She also competed in the women's kumite +68 kg at the 2019 European Games held in Minsk, Belarus. She lost all three matches in the elimination round and she did not advance to compete in the semi-finals.

In 2021, Antunovic competed at the World Olympic Qualification Tournament held in Paris, France hoping to qualify for the 2020 Summer Olympics in Tokyo, Japan. She was eliminated in her first match.

== Achievements ==
Year	Competition	Venue	Rank	Event
2017	European Championships	Kocaeli, Turkey	3rd	Kumite +68 kg
2018	World Championships	Madrid, Spain	3rd	Kumite +68 kg
