= Alparslan Yamanoğlu =

Turkish karateka (born 1997)

- Born: 1 January 1997 (age 29); Erzurum, Turkey
- Nationality: Turkish
- Division: +84 kg
- Style: Karate – Kumite

Alparslan Yamanoğlu (born 1 January 1997) is a Turkish karateka competing in the kumite +84 kg and team kumite events.

== Career ==
In 2016, Yamanoğlu won the silver medal in the team kumite event at the 2016 European Karate Championships held in Montpellier, France.

At the 2017 European Karate Championships in İzmit, Turkey, he became European champion in team kumite. Later that year, he secured a silver medal in the +84 kg kumite event at the 2017 Islamic Solidarity Games in Baku, Azerbaijan.

In 2018, Yamanoğlu won gold in team kumite at the 2018 European Karate Championships in Novi Sad, Serbia. The same year, at the 2018 World Karate Championships in Madrid, Spain, he earned a silver medal in team kumite and a bronze medal in the individual +84 kg event.

In 2019, he claimed another European Championship gold medal in team kumite in Guadalajara, Spain.
