= Asiman Gurbanli =

Azerbaijani karateka (born 1992)

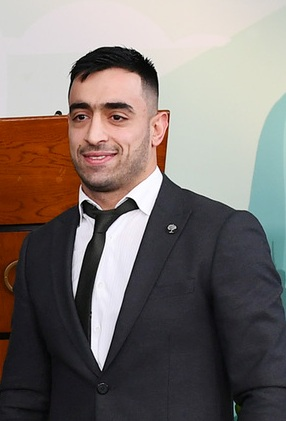
- Gurbanli in 2019

Personal information
- Born: 10 August 1992 (age 33)

Sport
- Country: Azerbaijan
- Sport: Karate
- Weight class: +84 kg
- Events: Kumite; Team kumite
Medal record
Men's karate
Representing Azerbaijan
World Championships
Bronze medal – third place	2021 Dubai	Kumite +84 kg
Bronze medal – third place	2021 Dubai	Team kumite
European Games
Gold medal – first place	2019 Minsk	Kumite +84 kg
Bronze medal – third place	2023 Kraków-Małopolska	Kumite +84 kg
European Championships
Gold medal – first place	2014 Tampere	Team kumite
Silver medal – second place	2022 Gaziantep	Team kumite
Bronze medal – third place	2015 Istanbul	Team kumite
Bronze medal – third place	2019 Guadalajara	Kumite +84 kg
Bronze medal – third place	2021 Poreč	Team kumite
Islamic Solidarity Games
Silver medal – second place	2021 Konya	Kumite +84 kg
Bronze medal – third place	2017 Baku	Kumite +84 kg

Asiman Gurbanli (born 10 August 1992) is an Azerbaijani karateka. He won the gold medal in the men's kumite +84 kg event at the 2019 European Games held in Minsk, Belarus. He also won one of the bronze medals in the men's +84 kg event at the 2021 World Karate Championships held in Dubai, United Arab Emirates.

== Career ==
In 2017, Gurbanli won one of the bronze medals in the men's kumite +84 kg event at the Islamic Solidarity Games held in Baku, Azerbaijan. At the 2019 European Karate Championships held in Guadalajara, Spain, he won one of the bronze medals in the men's kumite +84 kg event.

In June 2021, Gurbanli competed at the World Olympic Qualification Tournament held in Paris, France hoping to qualify for the 2020 Summer Olympics in Tokyo, Japan. In November 2021, he won one of the bronze medals in the men's +84 kg event at the World Karate Championships held in Dubai, United Arab Emirates.

Gurbanli competed in the men's kumite +84 kg event at the 2022 World Games held in Birmingham, United States. He finished in third place in his pool during the elimination round and he did not advance to compete in the semi-finals. Gurbanli won the silver medal in the men's +84 kg event at the 2021 Islamic Solidarity Games held in Konya, Turkey.

In 2023, he won one of the bronze medals in men's +84 kg event at the European Games held in Poland.

== Achievements ==
Year	Competition	Venue	Rank	Event
2014	European Championships	Tampere, Finland	1st	Team kumite
2015	European Championships	Istanbul, Turkey	3rd	Team kumite
2017	Islamic Solidarity Games	Baku, Azerbaijan	3rd	Kumite +84 kg
2019	European Championships	Guadalajara, Spain	3rd	Kumite +84 kg
2019	European Games	Minsk, Belarus	1st	Kumite +84 kg
2021	European Championships	Poreč, Croatia	3rd	Team kumite
2021	World Championships	Dubai, United Arab Emirates	3rd	Kumite +84 kg
2021	World Championships	Dubai, United Arab Emirates	3rd	Team kumite
2022	European Championships	Gaziantep, Turkey	2nd	Team kumite
2022	Islamic Solidarity Games	Konya, Turkey	2nd	Kumite +84 kg
2023	European Games	Kraków and Małopolska, Poland	3rd	Kumite +84 kg
