= Ilaha Gasimova =

Azerbaijani karateka

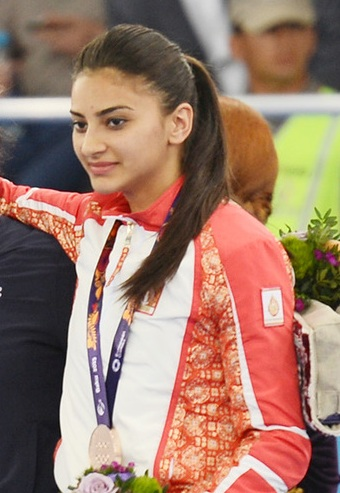

Personal information
- Nationality: Azerbaijan
- Citizenship: Azerbaijani
- Born: 14 October 1992 (age 33) Baku, Azerbaijan

Sport
- Sport: Karate

Ilaha Gasimova (born 14 October 1992) is an Azerbaijani karateka. Ilaha Gasimova won a bronze medal at the I European Games in 2015 and a silver medal at the IV Islamic Solidarity Games in 2017. She received her higher education at the Azerbaijan State Academy of Physical Culture and Sports.

== Career ==
Ilaha Gasimova took part in the First European Games under the flag of Azerbaijan in 2015. Speaking in the -55 kg weight category, Ilaha Gasimova beat the representative of Spain Cristina Ferrer Garcia with a score of 5:2 in the bronze medal match and became the owner of the bronze medal of the I European Games.

For this success, Ilaha Gasimova was awarded the Progress Medal by order of Azerbaijani President Ilham Aliyev.

In 2017, Ilaha Gasimova took part in the IV Islamic Solidarity Games under the flag of Azerbaijan. Speaking in the -55 kg weight category, Ilaha Gasimova in the final meeting with a score of 2:3 lost to the representative of Egypt Yasmin Attiyah and became the owner of the silver medal of the IV Islamic Solidarity Games.
