= 2015 European Karate Championships =

Karate competition

- Venue: Sinan Erdem Dome
- Location: Istanbul, Turkey
- Dates: 19–22 March
- Competitors: 482 from 47 nations

The 2015 European Karate Championships, the 50th edition, was held at Istanbul in Turkey from 19 to 22 March, 2015. A total of 482 competitors from 47 countries participated at the event.

== Medal table ==
* Host nation (Turkey)

Rank	Nation	Gold	Silver	Bronze	Total
1	Spain	3	0	6	9
2	Turkey*	2	6	3	11
3	France	2	3	4	9
4	Italy	2	1	3	6
5	Croatia	2	1	2	5
6	Azerbaijan	2	1	1	4
7	Austria	2	0	1	3
8	Serbia	1	0	0	1
9	Germany	0	2	3	5
10	Russia	0	1	1	2
11	Switzerland	0	1	0	1
12	Czech Republic	0	0	1	1
12	Finland	0	0	1	1
12	Latvia	0	0	1	1
12	Luxembourg	0	0	1	1
12	Montenegro	0	0	1	1
12	Netherlands	0	0	1	1
12	North Macedonia	0	0	1	1
12	Slovakia	0	0	1	1
Totals (19 entries)		16	16	32	64

== Medalists ==
=== Men's competition ===
==== Individual ====
Event	Gold	Silver	Bronze
Kata	(Spain) Damián Quintero	(Turkey) Mehmet Yakan	(France) Vu Duc Minh Dack (Italy) Mattia Busato
Kumite -60 kg	(Italy) Luca Maresca	(France) Sofiane Agoudjil	(Russia) Evgeny Plakhutin (Spain) Matías Gómez
Kumite -67 kg	(Azerbaijan) Niyazi Aliyev	(Turkey) Burak Uygur	(Croatia) Danil Domdjoni (Spain) Manuel Rasero
Kumite -75 kg	(Azerbaijan) Rafael Aghayev	(Germany) Noah Bitsch	(Italy) Luigi Busà (Latvia) Ruslans Sadikovs
Kumite -84 kg	(Italy) Nello Maestri	(Azerbaijan) Aykhan Mamayev	(France) Kenji Grillon (Turkey) Uğur Aktaş
Kumite +84 kg	(Serbia) Slobodan Bitević	(Turkey) Enes Erkan	(North Macedonia) Martin Nestorovski (Germany) Jonathan Horne

==== Team ====
Event	Gold	Silver	Bronze
Kata	Spain; José Carbonell; Damián Quintero; Francisco Salazar	Italy; Mattia Busato; Alessandro Iodice; Alfredo Tocco	France; Lucas Jeannot; Enzo Montarello; Ahmed Zemouri Croatia; Ivan Ermenc; Franjo Maškarin; Damjan Padovan
Kumite	Turkey; Enes Erkan; Gökhan Gündüz; Emre İpek; Rıdvan Kaptan; Yaser Şahintekin; Serkan Yağcı; Ziya Yaşar	France; Nadir Benaïssa; Amin Bouazza; Logan Da Costa; Marvin Garin; Kenji Grillon; Lou Lebrun; Lionel Nardy	Netherlands; Ozan Arslan; Geoffrey Berens; Tyron-Darnell Lardy; Lorenzo Manhoef; Moreno Sheppard; René Smaal; Donovan Wold Azerbaijan; Panah Abdullayev; Tural Aghalarzade; Rafael Aghayev; Shahin Atamov; Asiman Gurbanli; Orkhan Heydarli; Aykhan Mamayev

=== Women's competition ===
==== Individual ====
Event	Gold	Silver	Bronze
Kata	(Spain) Sandra Sánchez	(Turkey) Dilara Bozan	(Germany) Jasmin Bleul (Czech Republic) Veronika Mišková
Kumite -50 kg	(Austria) Bettina Plank	(France) Alexandra Recchia	(Germany) Duygu Bugur (Turkey) Serap Özçelik
Kumite -55 kg	(France) Emilie Thouy	(Turkey) Tuba Yakan	(Luxembourg) Jennifer Warling (Spain) Cristina Ferrer
Kumite -61 kg	(France) Lucie Ignace	(Croatia) Ana Lenard	(Slovakia) Ingrida Suchánková (Spain) Irene Colomar
Kumite -68 kg	(Austria) Alisa Buchinger	(Switzerland) Elena Quirici	(Montenegro) Marina Raković (Spain) Cristina Vizcaíno
Kumite +68 kg	(Croatia) Maša Martinović	(Turkey) Meltem Hocaoğlu	(Finland) Helena Kuusisto (France) Nadège Ait-Ibrahim

==== Team ====
Event	Gold	Silver	Bronze
Kata	Turkey; Dilara Bozan; Rabia Küsmüş; Gizem Şahin	Germany; Jasmin Bleul; Christine Heinrich; Sophie Wachter	Italy; Sara Battaglia; Viviana Bottaro; Michela Pezzetti Spain; Sonia García; Sheila Jorge; Paula Rodríguez
Kumite	Croatia; Ana-Marija Bujas Čelan; Ana Lenard; Azra Saleš; Ivona Tubić	Russia; Vera Kovaleva; Tatiana Oparina; Inga Sheroziya; Ivanna Zaytseva	Turkey; Merve Baltay; Merve Çoban; Serap Özçelik; Tuba Yakan Austria; Alisa Buchinger; Stephanie Kaup; Bettina Plank; Nathalie Reiter

== Participating countries ==
- Albania (3)
- Austria (8)
- Azerbaijan (16)
- Belarus (10)
- Belgium (9)
- Bosnia and Herzegovina (17)
- Bulgaria (5)
- Croatia (23)
- Cyprus (2)
- Czech Republic (6)
- Denmark (17)
- England (14)
- Estonia (2)
- Finland (9)
- France (20)
- Georgia (6)
- Germany (15)
- Greece (10)
- Hungary (16)
- Iceland (2)
- Ireland (7)
- Israel (6)
- Italy (17)
- Kosovo (11)
- Latvia (6)
- Luxembourg (5)
- Macedonia (18)
- Moldova (2)
- Monaco (1)
- Montenegro (15)
- Netherlands (7)
- Northern Ireland (1)
- Norway (3)
- Poland (13)
- Portugal (12)
- Romania (13)
- Russia (21)
- San Marino (1)
- Scotland (3)
- Serbia (20)
- Slovakia (11)
- Slovenia (13)
- Spain (19)
- Sweden (3)
- Switzerland (6)
- Turkey (24)
- Ukraine (14)
