= Maša Martinović =

Croatian karateka (born 1989)

- Born: 9 January 1989 (age 36); Čakovec, Croatia, Yugoslavia
- Other names: Maša Vidić
- Nationality: Croat
- Division: +68 kg
- Style: Karate Kumite
- Team: Karate Klub Hercegovina Zagreb

Maša Martinović
Medal record

Women's Karate

World Championships
Silver medal – second place	2012 Paris	Kumite Team
Bronze medal – third place	2010 Belgrade	Kumite Team
Bronze medal – third place	2007 Istanbul	Junior Kumite Team

European Championships
Bronze medal – third place	2016 Montpellier	Kumite +68 kg
Gold medal – first place	2015 Istanbul	Kumite +68 kg
Silver medal – second place	2012 Adeje	Kumite Team
Gold medal – first place	2008 Trieste	Junior Kumite Team

European Games
Gold medal – first place	2015 Baku	Kumite +68 kg

World Combat Games
Gold medal – first place	2013 Saint Petersburg	Kumite +68 kg

World University Championships
Gold medal – first place	2012 Bratislava	Kumite +68 kg

European University Championships
Gold medal – first place	2011 Sarajevo	Kumite +68 kg

Karate 1 Tournaments
Gold medal – first place	2016 Istanbul	Kumite +68 kg
Gold medal – first place	2016 Laško	Kumite +68 kg
Bronze medal – third place	2015 Salzburg	Kumite +68 kg
Silver medal – second place	2014 Salzburg	Kumite +68 kg
Gold medal – first place	2014 Laško	Kumite +68 kg
Silver medal – second place	2013 Hanau	Kumite +68 kg
Gold medal – first place	2013 Istanbul	Kumite +68 kg
Gold medal – first place	2013 Tyumen	Kumite +68 kg
Gold medal – first place	2013 Laško	Kumite +68 kg
Gold medal – first place	2013 Paris	Kumite +68 kg
Gold medal – first place	2012 Salzburg	Kumite +68 kg
Gold medal – first place	2012 Hanau	Kumite +68 kg
Bronze medal – third place	2012 Paris	Kumite +68 kg¸
Gold medal – first place	2011 Salzburg	Kumite +68 kg

Balkan Senior Championships
Gold medal – first place	2016 Istanbul	Kumite +68 kg
Gold medal – first place	2015 Čačak	Kumite +68 kg
Gold medal – first place	2012 Herceg Novi	Kumite +68 kg
Gold medal – first place	2012 Herceg Novi	Kumite team

Mediterranean Senior Championships
Gold medal – first place	2016 Toledo	Kumite +68 kg
Gold medal – first place	2012 Tuzla	Kumite +68 kg
Gold medal – first place	2012 Tuzla	Kumite team

Tournaments
Bronze medal – third place	2011 Aschaffenburg	Kumite +68 kg
Bronze medal – third place	2011 Monza	Kumite +68 kg
Gold medal – first place	2010 Paris	Kumite +68 kg
Bronze medal – third place	2009 Salzburg	Kumite +68 kg

Maša Martinović (married Vidić, born 9 January 1989 in Čakovec, Croatia) is a Croatian karate athlete competing in category kumite female +68 kg.

== Achievements ==
2016

- Bronze European Championships – 5–8 May, Montpellier, FRA – kumite +68 kg
- 5th place World Championships – 25–30 October, Linz, AUT – kumite +68 kg

2015

- Gold 1st European Games – 14 June, Baku, AZE – kumite +68 kg
- Gold European Championships – 19–22 March, Istanbul, TUR – kumite +68 kg

2013

- Gold World Combat Games – 20–21 October, Saint Petersburg, RUS – kumite +68 kg
- Karate 1 Premier League – Grand Winner 2013 – kumite +68 kg

2012

- Gold World University Championships – 13–15 July, Bratislava, SVK – kumite +68 kg
- Silver World Championships – 21–25 November, Paris, FRA – kumite team
- Silver European Championships – 10–13 May, Adeje, ESP – kumite team

2011

- Gold European University Championships – 22–25 July, Sarajevo, BIH – kumite +68 kg

2010

- Bronze World Championships – 27–31 October, Belgrade, SRB – kumite team

2008

- Gold European Cadet-Junior Karate Championships – 15–17 February, Trieste, ITA – junior kumite team

2007

- Bronze World Cadet-Junior Karate Championships – 19–21 October, Istanbul, TUR – junior kumite team
