= Slobodan Bitević =

Serbian karateka (born 1988)

- Born: 17 August 1988 (age 38); Alibunar, SFR Yugoslavia
- Nationality: Serb
- Division: +84 kilogramme (kg)
- Style: Karate Kumite
- Team: Karate Klub Dinamo Pančevo
- Trainer: Predrag Stojadinov
- Rank: 9

Slobodan Bitević (born 17 August 1988 in Alibunar, Serbia) is a Serbian karate athlete competing in kumite +84 kg division.

== Achievements ==
2017

- Bronze Karate1 Series A - Salzburg – 7–9 September, Salzburg, AUT – kumite +84 kg
- Bronze European Karate Championships – 4–7 May, Kocaeli, TUR – kumite +84 kg

2016

- Bronze Karate1 Premier League - Hamburg – 23–25 September, Hamburg, GER – kumite +84 kg
- Gold Karate1 Premier League - Salzburg – 15–17 April, Salzburg, AUT – kumite +84 kg
- Gold Karate Balkan Seniors Championship – 27–28 February, Istanbul, TUR – kumite +84 kg

2015

- Gold European Karate Championships – 19–22 March, Istanbul, TUR – kumite +84
- Gold Karate Balkan Seniors Championship – 21–22 February, Čačak, SRB – kumite +84 kg

2014

- Silver Karate1 Premier League – Grand Final – 11–13 October, Salzburg, AUT – kumite +84 kg
- Bronze European Karate Championships – 1–4 May, Tampere, FIN – kumite +84 kg

2013

- Silver Karate1 Premier League – Grand Final – 30 November, Salzburg, AUT – kumite +84 kg

2012

- Bronze European Karate Championships – 10–13 May, Adeje, ESP – kumite –84 kg
- Gold Karate Balkan Seniors Championship – 16–18 March, Herceg Novi, MON – kumite –84 kg

2011

- Gold European Karate Championships – 6–9 May, Zürich, SUI – kumite –84 kg

2010

- Gold World Karate Championships – 27–31 October, Belgrade, SRB – kumite team
- Gold World Karate Championships – 27–31 October, Belgrade, SRB – kumite –84 kg
- Gold Karate Balkan Seniors Championship – 24–26 September, Loutraki, GRE – kumite –84 kg

2008

- Silver European Karate Championships – 5–8 February, Tallinn, EST – kumite –80 kg
