= 2021 Karate1 Premier League =

The Karate 1 – Premier League 2021 is a series of international karate competitions organized by the World Karate Federation (WKF) during the year 2021. The series consists of multiple stages held in different countries as part of the Premier League circuit and brings together the world's top karate athletes competing in both kata and kumite disciplines.

== Events ==
Karate 1 – Premier League 2021
Stages	Date	Series	City	Country
1	12–14 March 2021	Premier League – Istanbul	Istanbul	Turkey
2	30 April – 2 May 2021	Premier League – Lisbon	Lisbon	Portugal
3	3–5 September 2021	Premier League – Cairo	Cairo	Egypt
4	1–3 October 2021	Premier League – Moscow	Moscow	Russia

== Karate 1 Premier League – Istanbul 2021 ==
The Karate 1 Premier League – Istanbul 2021 was held from 12 to 14 March 202112 to 14 March 2021 in Istanbul, Turkey.

=== Men ===
Event	Gold	Silver	Bronze
Individual kata	Quintero Capdevila Damian Hugo; Spain	Sofuoglu Ali; Turkey	Torres Gutierrez Ariel; United States
Individual kata	Quintero Capdevila Damian Hugo; Spain	Sofuoglu Ali; Turkey	Ozdemir Enes; Turkey
Kumite -60 kg	Samdan Eray; Turkey	Farzaliyev Firdovsi; Azerbaijan	Saymatov Sadriddin; Uzbekistan
Kumite -60 kg	Samdan Eray; Turkey	Farzaliyev Firdovsi; Azerbaijan	Pavlov Emil; North Macedonia
Kumite -67 kg	Elsawy Ali; Egypt	Uygur Burak; Turkey	Sharafutdinov Ernest; Russia
Kumite -67 kg	Elsawy Ali; Egypt	Uygur Burak; Turkey	Tadissi Yves Martial; Hungary
Kumite -75 kg	Busa Luigi; Italy	Otabolaev Dastonbek; Uzbekistan	Asiabari Ali Asghar; Iran
Kumite -75 kg	Busa Luigi; Italy	Otabolaev Dastonbek; Uzbekistan	Bitsch Noah; Germany
Kumite -84 kg	Poorshab Zabiollah; Iran	Yuldashev Daniyar; Kazakhstan	Martina Michele; Italy
Kumite -84 kg	Poorshab Zabiollah; Iran	Yuldashev Daniyar; Kazakhstan	Ramadan Mohamed Ahmed; Egypt
Kumite +84 kg	Ganjzadeh Sajad; Iran	Talibov Ryzvan; Ukraine	Arkania Gogita; Georgia
Kumite +84 kg	Ganjzadeh Sajad; Iran	Talibov Ryzvan; Ukraine	Gurbanli Asiman; Azerbaijan
Team kata	Turkey; Sofuoglu Ali; Ozdemir Enes; Goktas Emre Vefa	Egypt; Mohamed Zeyad Mohamed; Hammad Youssef; Elkoumy Ali	Azerbaijan; Guliyev Ismayil; Baljanli Tural; Aliyev Rovshan
Team kata	Turkey; Sofuoglu Ali; Ozdemir Enes; Goktas Emre Vefa	Egypt; Mohamed Zeyad Mohamed; Hammad Youssef; Elkoumy Ali	Spain; Martin Romero Raul; Manzana Diaz Alejandro; Galan Lopez Sergio

=== Women ===
Event	Gold	Silver	Bronze
Individual kata	Sanchez Jaime Sandra; Spain	Bozan Dilara; Turkey	D Onofrio Terryana; Italy
Individual kata	Sanchez Jaime Sandra; Spain	Bozan Dilara; Turkey	Casale Carola; Italy
Kumite -50 kg	Ozcelik Arapoglu Serap; Turkey	Hubrich Shara; Germany	Salama Reem Ahmed; Egypt
Kumite -50 kg	Ozcelik Arapoglu Serap; Turkey	Hubrich Shara; Germany	Bahmanyar Sara; Iran
Kumite -55 kg	Kumizaki Valeria; Brazil	Toro Meneses Valentina; Chile	Banaszczyk Dorota; Poland
Kumite -55 kg	Kumizaki Valeria; Brazil	Toro Meneses Valentina; Chile	Terliuga Anzhelika; Ukraine
Kumite -61 kg	Prekovic Jovana; Serbia	Alipourkeshka Rozita; Iran	Coban Merve; Turkey
Kumite -61 kg	Prekovic Jovana; Serbia	Alipourkeshka Rozita; Iran	Suchankova Ingrida; Slovakia
Kumite -68 kg	Semeraro Silvia; Italy	Abdelaziz Feryal; Egypt	Buchinger Alisa; Austria
Kumite -68 kg	Semeraro Silvia; Italy	Abdelaziz Feryal; Egypt	Zaretska Irina; Azerbaijan
Kumite +68 kg	Berultseva Sofya; Kazakhstan	Hocaoglu Akyol Meltem; Turkey	Ferracuti Clio; Italy
Kumite +68 kg	Berultseva Sofya; Kazakhstan	Hocaoglu Akyol Meltem; Turkey	Kneer Johanna; Germany
Team kata	Spain; Roy Rubio Raquel; Rodriguez Encabo Lidia; Garcia Lozano Marta	Slovakia; Vanova Vanda; Merasicka Nikoleta; Bacikova Ludmila	Egypt; Hesham Aya; Mohamed Toka Heshham; Antar Noha Amr
Team kata	Spain; Roy Rubio Raquel; Rodriguez Encabo Lidia; Garcia Lozano Marta	Slovakia; Vanova Vanda; Merasicka Nikoleta; Bacikova Ludmila	Turkey; Yilmaz Ayse; Cigirdik Hayrulnisa; Balik Hazel

== Karate1 Premier League - Lisbon 2021 ==
The Karate 1 Premier League – Lisbon 2021 was held from 30 April to 2 May 2021 in Lisbon, Portugal.

=== Men ===
Event	Gold	Silver	Bronze
Individual kata	Ozdemir Enes; Turkey	Ujihara Yuki; Switzerland	Sofuoglu Ali; Turkey
Individual kata	Ozdemir Enes; Turkey	Ujihara Yuki; Switzerland	Moto Kazumasa; Japan
Kumite -60 kg	Alpysbaev Kaisar; Kazakhstan	Kalnins Kalvis; Latvia	Crescenzo Angelo; Italy
Kumite -60 kg	Alpysbaev Kaisar; Kazakhstan	Kalnins Kalvis; Latvia	Assadilov Darkhan; Kazakhstan
Kumite -67 kg	Da Costa Steven; France	Almasatfa Abdel Rahman; Jordan	Elsawy Ali; Egypt
Kumite -67 kg	Da Costa Steven; France	Almasatfa Abdel Rahman; Jordan	Uygur Burak; Turkey
Kumite -75 kg	Busa Luigi; Italy	Asgari Ghoncheh Bahman; Iran	Abdelaziz Abdalla; Egypt
Kumite -75 kg	Busa Luigi; Italy	Asgari Ghoncheh Bahman; Iran	Horuna Stanislav; Ukraine
Kumite -84 kg	Poorshab Zabiollah; Iran	Araga Ryutaro; Japan	Abdesselem Farouk; France
Kumite -84 kg	Poorshab Zabiollah; Iran	Araga Ryutaro; Japan	Aktas Ugur; Turkey
Kumite +84 kg	Arkania Gogita; Georgia	Gurbanli Asiman; Azerbaijan	Ganjzadeh Sajad; Iran
Kumite +84 kg	Arkania Gogita; Georgia	Gurbanli Asiman; Azerbaijan	Horne Jonathan; Germany
Team kata	Turkey; Sofuoglu Ali; Ozdemir Enes; Goktas Emre Vefa	Italy; Panagia Giuseppe; Iodice Alessandro; Gallo Gianluca	Spain; Martin Romero Raul; Manzana Diaz Alejandro; Galan Lopez Sergio
Team kata	Turkey; Sofuoglu Ali; Ozdemir Enes; Goktas Emre Vefa	Italy; Panagia Giuseppe; Iodice Alessandro; Gallo Gianluca	Azerbaijan; Guliyev Ismayil; Baljanli Tural; Aliyev Rovshan

=== Women ===
Event	Gold	Silver	Bronze
Individual kata	Hikaru Ono; Japan	Sandra Sánchez Jaime; Spain	Dilara Bozan; Turkey
Individual kata	Hikaru Ono; Japan	Sandra Sánchez Jaime; Spain	Lidia Rodríguez Encabo; Spain
Kumite -50 kg	Junna Tsukii; Philippines	Moldir Zhangbyrbay; Kazakhstan	Miho Miyahara; Japan
Kumite -50 kg	Junna Tsukii; Philippines	Moldir Zhangbyrbay; Kazakhstan	Alexandra Recchia; France
Kumite -55 kg	Anzhelika Terliuga; Ukraine	Giana Lotfy; Egypt	Merve Çoban; Turkey
Kumite -55 kg	Anzhelika Terliuga; Ukraine	Giana Lotfy; Egypt	Leila Heurtault; France
Kumite -61 kg	Jovana Preković; Serbia	Giana Lotfy; Egypt	Merve Çoban; Turkey
Kumite -61 kg	Jovana Preković; Serbia	Giana Lotfy; Egypt	Leila Heurtault; France
Kumite -68 kg	Li Gong; China	Elena Quirici; Switzerland	Feryal Abdelaziz; Egypt
Kumite -68 kg	Li Gong; China	Elena Quirici; Switzerland	Marina Raković; Montenegro
Kumite +68 kg	Meltem Hocaoğlu Akyol; Turkey	María Torres García; Spain	Laura Palacio González; Spain
Kumite +68 kg	Meltem Hocaoğlu Akyol; Turkey	María Torres García; Spain	Hamideh Abbasali; Iran
Team kata	Spain; Raquel Roy Rubio; Lidia Rodríguez Encabo; Marta García Lozano	Italy; Terryana D'Onofrio; Michela Pezzetti; Carola Casale	Egypt; Toka Hesham Mohamed; Noha Antar; Asmaa Mahmoud
Team kata	Spain; Raquel Roy Rubio; Lidia Rodríguez Encabo; Marta García Lozano	Italy; Terryana D'Onofrio; Michela Pezzetti; Carola Casale	Spain; Raquel Roy Rubio; Lidia Rodríguez Encabo; Marta García Lozano

== Karate1 Premier League - Cairo 2021 ==
The Karate 1 Premier League – Cairo 2021 was held from 3 to 5 September 2021 in Cairo, Egypt.

=== Men ===
Event	Gold	Silver	Bronze
Individual kata	Enes Özdemir; Turkey	Ali Sofuoğlu; Turkey	Damian Hugo Quintero Capdevila; Spain
Individual kata	Enes Özdemir; Turkey	Ali Sofuoğlu; Turkey	Emre Vefa Göktaş; Turkey
Kumite -60 kg	Malek Salama; Egypt	Tas Sami; Algeria	Viktor Stefanyuk; Ukraine
Kumite -60 kg	Malek Salama; Egypt	Tas Sami; Algeria	Nikita Filipov; Ukraine
Kumite -67 kg	Vinicius Figueira; Brazil	Yves Martial Tadissi; Hungary	Jesus Leonardo Rodriguez; Mexico
Kumite -67 kg	Vinicius Figueira; Brazil	Yves Martial Tadissi; Hungary	Gianluca De Vivo; Italy
Kumite -75 kg	Abdalla Abdeleziz; Egypt	Luca Rettenbacher; Austria	Matias Rodriguez Fuentes; Chile
Kumite -75 kg	Abdalla Abdeleziz; Egypt	Luca Rettenbacher; Austria	Andrii Zaplitnyi; Ukraine
Kumite -84 kg	Youssef Badawy; Egypt	Omar Mohamed Ashraf; Egypt	Walid Deghali; Belgium
Kumite -84 kg	Youssef Badawy; Egypt	Omar Mohamed Ashraf; Egypt	Mohamed Ramadan; Egypt
Kumite +84 kg	Tarek Taha Mahmoud; Egypt	Hazem Ahmed Mohamed; Egypt	Luca Costa; Belgium
Kumite +84 kg	Tarek Taha Mahmoud; Egypt	Hazem Ahmed Mohamed; Egypt	Ryazvan Talibov; Ukraine
Team kata	Spain; Sergio Galán López; Óscar García Cuadrado; Alejandro Manzana Díaz	Egypt; Islam Hassan; Karim Waleed Ghaly; Mostafa Elghobashy	Egypt; Zeyad Mohamed Mohamed; Youssef Hammad; Ali Elkoumy
Team kata	Spain; Sergio Galán López; Óscar García Cuadrado; Alejandro Manzana Díaz	Egypt; Islam Hassan; Karim Waleed Ghaly; Mostafa Elghobashy	Spain; Mario Tardío Royo; Xabier Pereda Elorduy; José Manuel Carbonell López

=== Women ===
Event	Gold	Silver	Bronze
Individual kata	Ono Maho; Japan	Terryana D'Onofrio; Italy	Carola Casale; Italy
Individual kata	Ono Maho; Japan	Terryana D'Onofrio; Italy	Sakura Kokumai; United States
Kumite -50 kg	Junna Tsukii; Philippines	Areeg Rashed; Egypt	Reem Salama; Egypt
Kumite -50 kg	Junna Tsukii; Philippines	Areeg Rashed; Egypt	Yasmin Elgewily; Egypt
Kumite -55 kg	Valeria Kumizaki; Brazil	Carolaini Zefino Pereira; Brazil	Hana Kuklová; Slovakia
Kumite -55 kg	Valeria Kumizaki; Brazil	Carolaini Zefino Pereira; Brazil	Maya Schaerer; Switzerland
Kumite -61 kg	Anita Serogina; Ukraine	Haya Jumaa; Canada	Noursin Aly; Egypt
Kumite -61 kg	Anita Serogina; Ukraine	Haya Jumaa; Canada	Sabrina Zefino Pereira; Brazil
Kumite -68 kg	Halyna Melnyk; Ukraine	Elina Sieliienienieva; Ukraine	Maryam Ajaray; Morocco
Kumite -68 kg	Halyna Melnyk; Ukraine	Elina Sieliienienieva; Ukraine	Elena Quirici; Switzerland
Kumite +68 kg	Sohila Abouismail; Egypt	Anastasiya Stepashko; Ukraine	Habiba Helmy; Egypt
Kumite +68 kg	Sohila Abouismail; Egypt	Anastasiya Stepashko; Ukraine	Aleksandra Stubleva; Bulgaria
Team kata	Spain; María López Pintado; Lidia Rodríguez Encabo; Raquel Roy Rubio	Brazil; Thayane Nesi Teixeira; Sabrina Zefino Pereira; Carolaini Zefino Pereira	Egypt; Asmaa Mahmoud; Aya Hesham; Noha Antar
Team kata	Spain; María López Pintado; Lidia Rodríguez Encabo; Raquel Roy Rubio	Brazil; Thayane Nesi Teixeira; Sabrina Zefino Pereira; Carolaini Zefino Pereira	Saudi Arabia; Manal Alzaid; Shahad Alammar; Lama Al Saeed

== Karate 1 Premier League – Moscow 2021 ==
The Karate 1 Premier League – Moscow 2021 was held from 1 to 3 October 2021 in Moscow, Russia.

=== Men ===
Event	Gold	Silver	Bronze
Individual kata	Nishiyama Kakeru; Japan	Abe Sakichi; Japan	Ikeda Ryusei; Japan
Individual kata	Nishiyama Kakeru; Japan	Abe Sakichi; Japan	Damian Hugo Quintero; Spain
Kumite -60 kg	Kaisar Alpysbay; Kazakhstan	Evgeny Plakhutin; Russia	Angelo Crescenzo; Italy
Kumite -60 kg	Kaisar Alpysbay; Kazakhstan	Evgeny Plakhutin; Russia	Iurik Ogannisian; Russia
Kumite -67 kg	Ali Elsawy; Egypt	Yves Martial Tadissi; Hungary	Danila Mikhailichenko; Russia
Kumite -67 kg	Ali Elsawy; Egypt	Yves Martial Tadissi; Hungary	Stefan Pokorny; Austria
Kumite -75 kg	Daniele De Vivo; Italy	Mamdouh El-Sayed Abdelaziz; Egypt	Karoly Gabor Harspataki; Hungary
Kumite -75 kg	Daniele De Vivo; Italy	Mamdouh El-Sayed Abdelaziz; Egypt	Asiman Mamedov; Russia
Kumite -84 kg	Youssef Badawy; Egypt	Nabil Ech-Chaabi; Morocco	Anton Isakau; Belarus
Kumite -84 kg	Youssef Badawy; Egypt	Nabil Ech-Chaabi; Morocco	Panah Abdullayev; Azerbaijan
Kumite +84 kg	Gogita Arkania; Georgia	Aliaksei Vodchyts; Belarus	Asiman Gurbanli; Azerbaijan
Kumite +84 kg	Gogita Arkania; Georgia	Aliaksei Vodchyts; Belarus	Brian Timmermans; Curaçao
Team kata	Italy; Mattia Busato; Alessandro Iodice; Gianluca Gallo	Spain; Raul Martin Romero; Alejandro Manzana Diaz; Sergio Galan Lopez	Russia; Emil Skovorodnikov; Mehman Rzaev; Maksim Ksenofontov
Team kata	Italy; Mattia Busato; Alessandro Iodice; Gianluca Gallo	Spain; Raul Martin Romero; Alejandro Manzana Diaz; Sergio Galan Lopez	Kuwait; Mohammad Hussain; Sayed Salman Almosawi; Sayed Mohammed Almosawi

=== Women ===
Event	Gold	Silver	Bronze
Individual kata	Sandra Sanchez Jaime; Spain	Sakura Kokumai; United States	Maho Ono; Japan
Individual kata	Sandra Sanchez Jaime; Spain	Sakura Kokumai; United States	Hikaru Ono; Japan
Kumite -50 kg	Moldir Zhangbyrbay; Kazakhstan	Bettina Plank; Austria	Jelena Pehar; Croatia
Kumite -50 kg	Moldir Zhangbyrbay; Kazakhstan	Bettina Plank; Austria	Elizaveta Grigoreva; Russia
Kumite -55 kg	Anna Chernysheva; Russia	Sabina Zakharova; Kazakhstan	Jennifer Warling; Luxembourg
Kumite -55 kg	Anna Chernysheva; Russia	Sabina Zakharova; Kazakhstan	Carlota Fernandez Osorio; Spain
Kumite -61 kg	Anastasiya Chupina; Russia	Tjasa Ristic; Slovenia	Haya Jumaa; Canada
Kumite -61 kg	Anastasiya Chupina; Russia	Tjasa Ristic; Slovenia	Ingrida Suchankova; Slovakia
Kumite -68 kg	Silvia Semeraro; Italy	Feryal Abdelaziz; Egypt	Victoria Isaeva; Russia
Kumite -68 kg	Silvia Semeraro; Italy	Feryal Abdelaziz; Egypt	Irina Zaretska; Azerbaijan
Kumite 68+ kg	Sofya Berultseva; Kazakhstan	Vera Kovaleva; Russia	Sohila Abouismail; Egypt
Kumite 68+ kg	Sofya Berultseva; Kazakhstan	Vera Kovaleva; Russia	Menna Shaaban Okila; Egypt
Team kata	Italy; Michela Pezzetti; Terryana D'Onofrio; Carola Casale	Spain; Raquel Roy Rubio; Lidia Rodriguez Encabo; Maria Lopez Pintado	Russia; Daria Tulyakova; Mariya Zotova; Polina Kotlyarova
Team kata	Italy; Michela Pezzetti; Terryana D'Onofrio; Carola Casale	Spain; Raquel Roy Rubio; Lidia Rodriguez Encabo; Maria Lopez Pintado	Slovakia; Vanda Vanova; Ludmila Bacikova; Nikoleta Merasicka
