= 2021 Karate World Olympic Qualification Tournament =

Olympic Karate 2020 Qualification Tournament
- Venue: AccorHotels Arena sports hall
- Location: (France) Paris
- Dates: 11–13 June 2021

The Olympics Karate 2020 Qualification Tournament was held from 11 to 13 June, 2021. The event took place in AccorHotels Arena sports hall, located in Paris, France.

The tournament consisted of four categories for both men and women, as determined for Tokyo 2020. Each NOC had the opportunity to register one athlete for each of the eight categories, with exception to any category where they already have an athlete qualified for Tokyo 2020 through the Olympic Standing of May 2021. The four categories for both men and women included Kata, as well as three other classes created from the combining of the remaining five (WKF) weight categories. Host country athletes (Japan) only were able to register and compete in those categories in which no Japanese athlete is among the 50 highest ranked in the WKF Ranking as of May 2021. Athletes already qualified were not allowed to participate. The three highest placed athletes in each of the eight Olympic events automatically qualified for the Tokyo 2020 Olympic Games respecting the maximum quota per NOC.

== Qualification summary ==
NOC	Men				Women				Total
NOC	Kata	67 kg	75 kg	+75 kg	Kata	55 kg	61 kg	+61 kg	Total
Azerbaijan		X							1
Bulgaria						X			1
Canada				X					1
Chinese Taipei	X								1
Egypt								X	1
Georgia				X					1
Germany			X		X				2
France					X				1
Hungary			X						1
Italy								X	1
Jordan		X							1
Kazakhstan			X			X			2
Morocco							X		1
ROC						X			1
Saudi Arabia				X					1
South Korea	X								1
Switzerland								X	1
Turkey		X			X				2
Ukraine							X		1
United States	X								1
Venezuela							X		1
Total: 21 NOCs	3	3	3	3	3	3	3	3	24

== Results ==
=== Men ===
==== Kata ====
Seeds

1. Ariel Torres (USA)
2. Ilja Smorguner (GER)
3. Ahmed Shawky (EGY)
4. Adnane El Hakimi (MAR)

Round 1

Pool 1		Pool 2		Pool 3		Pool 4	
Athlete	Total	Athlete	Total	Athlete	Total	Athlete	Total
Abolfazl Shahrjerdi (IRI)	24.88	Ahmed Shawky (EGY)	23.98	Park Hee-jun (KOR)	25.14	Ilja Smorguner (GER)	24.88
Jonathan Maruani (FRA)	24.28	John Enrico Vasquez (PHI)	23.66	Mohammad Al-Mosawi (KUW)	24.66	Cheng Tsz Man (HKG)	23.12
Konstantin Sutiagin (ROC)	23.68	Pavol Szolár (SVK)	23.52	David Contreras (COL)	23.86	Khai Truong (SWE)	22.68
Mariano Wong (PER)	22.98	Shaun Yuen (AUS)	23.00	Abdelhakim Haoua (ALG)	23.34	Marwan Al-Mazemi (UAE)	21.92
Petru Comănescu (ROU)	22.66	Matteo Tamborlani (CZE)	22.06	Allan Sanou (BUR)	23.14	Andrés Tejada (ECU)	21.74
Mario López (ESA)	21.80	Adham Hashem (QAT)	20.60	Patrick Valet (AUT)	22.80	James Mwangi (KEN)	20.00
Dominic Wilkes (TTO)	20.06						
Pool 5		Pool 6		Pool 7		Pool 8	
Wang Yi-ta (TPE)	24.26	Roman Heydarov (AZE)	24.72	Yuki Ujihara (SUI)	24.60	Ariel Torres (USA)	25.46
Jorge Caeiros (POR)	22.40	Adnane El Hakimi (MAR)	23.60	Mikhayil Mkhitaryan (ARM)	21.98	Botond Nagy (HUN)	24.38
Toshihide Uchiage (CAN)	22.08	Madi Kateshov (KAZ)	23.40	Jordan Szafranek (GBR)	21.86	Ahmad Zigi Zaresta Yuda (INA)	24.38
Dovydas Žymantas (LTU)	20.72	Maksymilian Szczypkowski (POL)	23.18	Panagiotis Kapsalis (GRE)	21.32	Dyun Kimura (BRA)	23.12
Keanu Stuurman (NAM)	19.00	Kirils Membo (LAT)	22.66	Stylianos Nicolaou (CYP)	20.84	Rick Sonnema (NED)	22.42
Waldo Ramírez (MEX)	DNS	Héctor Cención (PAN)	21.92	Normil Nock (HAI)	19.00	Hugh Connolly (IRL)	20.58

Round 2

Pool 1		Pool 2		Pool 3		Pool 4	
Athlete	Total	Athlete	Total	Athlete	Total	Athlete	Total
Abolfazl Shahrjerdi (IRI)	24.66	Park Hee-jun (KOR)	25.72	Wang Yi-ta (TPE)	25.06	Ariel Torres (USA)	25.60
Ahmed Shawky (EGY)	24.60	Ilja Smorguner (GER)	25.42	Adnane El Hakimi (MAR)	24.60	Yuki Ujihara (SUI)	25.34
Konstantin Sutiagin (ROC)	24.48	Mohammad Al-Mosawi (KUW)	24.26	Roman Heydarov (AZE)	24.52	Botond Nagy (HUN)	24.72
John Enrico Vasquez (PHI)	23.94	David Contreras (COL)	24.12	Madi Kateshov (KAZ)	23.86	Ahmad Zigi Zaresta Yuda (INA)	24.14
Jonathan Maruani (FRA)	23.46	Marwan Al-Mazemi (UAE)	23.54	Jorge Caeiros (POR)	23.20	Dyun Kimura (BRA)	23.78
Pavol Szolár (SVK)	23.14	Cheng Tsz Man (HKG)	23.52	Maksymilian Szczypkowski (POL)	22.14	Mikhayil Mkhitaryan (ARM)	22.52
Shaun Yuen (AUS)	23.14	Abdelhakim Haoua (ALG)	23.00	Toshihide Uchiage (CAN)	21.54	Panagiotis Kapsalis (GRE)	22.14
Mariano Wong (PER)	23.06	Khai Truong (SWE)	22.88	Dovydas Žymantas (LTU)	20.40	Jordan Szafranek (GBR)	20.52

Round 3

Pool 1		Pool 2	
Athlete	Total	Athlete	Total
Park Hee-jun (KOR)	27.12	Ariel Torres (USA)	25.28
Abolfazl Shahrjerdi (IRI)	25.80	Wang Yi-ta (TPE)	24.78
David Contreras (COL)	25.66	Yuki Ujihara (SUI)	24.26
Ahmed Shawky (EGY)	25.42	Adnane El Hakimi (MAR)	24.20
Ilja Smorguner (GER)	25.34	Roman Heydarov (AZE)	24.20
John Enrico Vasquez (PHI)	24.96	Botond Nagy (HUN)	23.80
Mohammad Al-Mosawi (KUW)	24.74	Ahmad Zigi Zaresta Yuda (INA)	23.04
Konstantin Sutiagin (ROC)	24.20	Madi Kateshov (KAZ)	22.44

Round 4

Match 1		Match 2	
Athlete	Total	Athlete	Total
Abolfazl Shahrjerdi (IRI)	25.86	Wang Yi-ta (TPE)	25.02
Yuki Ujihara (SUI)	25.46	David Contreras (COL)	24.12

Round-robin

Pos	Athlete	M	W	L	(United States)	(Chinese Taipei)	(South Korea)	(Iran)
1	Ariel Torres (USA)	3	3	0	—	26.00	26.26	25.66
2	Wang Yi-ta (TPE)	3	2	1	25.40	—	25.00	25.62
3	Park Hee-jun (KOR)	3	1	2	25.32	24.98	—	25.98
4	Abolfazl Shahrjerdi (IRI)	3	0	3	24.66	24.28	25.26	—

==== 67 kg ====
Seeds

1. Eray Şamdan (TUR)
2. Vinícius Figueira (BRA)
3. Kalvis Kalniņš (LAT)
4. Sadriddin Saymatov (UZB)

Pool 1

Round of 128
	Score	
Deivis Ferreras (DOM)	0–1	Orges Arifi (ALB)

Round of 64
Orges Arifi (ALB)	2
Bogdan Gogoloși (ROU)	0
Boran Berak (CRO)	5
Dominik Kočandrle (CZE)	4
Stefan Joksić (SRB)	6
Devid Nguyen (BLR)	4
Gegham Nikoghosyan (ARM)	0
Yves Martial Tadissi (HUN)	2
Nematollah Noori (SWE)	3
Gonzalo Navarro (ARG)	3
Sami Tas (ALG)	0
Hnat Pak (UKR)	3
Lee Chun Ho (HKG)	0
Jordan Thomas (GBR)	4
Christian Wever (GUA)	4
Kalvis Kalniņš (LAT)	2

Round of 32
Orges Arifi (ALB)	1
Boran Berak (CRO)	3
Stefan Joksić (SRB)	1
Yves Martial Tadissi (HUN)	2
Nematollah Noori (SWE)	0
Hnat Pak (UKR)	1
Jordan Thomas (GBR)	2
Christian Wever (GUA)	0

Round of 16
Boran Berak (CRO)	2
Yves Martial Tadissi (HUN)	3
Hnat Pak (UKR)	0
Jordan Thomas (GBR)	1

Quarterfinals
Yves Martial Tadissi (HUN)	5
Jordan Thomas (GBR)	1

Pool 2

Round of 128
	Score	
Lee Ji-hwan (KOR)	0–2	Firdovsi Farzaliyev (AZE)

Round of 64
Firdovsi Farzaliyev (AZE)	1
Luca Spitz (SUI)	0
Omar Laattar (NED)	0
Jason Ramil Macaalay (PHI)	2
Abdullah Shaaban (KUW)	2
Eldin Hajdarpašić (BIH)	0
Aaron Tobossou (BEN)	0
Nur Halim Arlendi (INA)	6
Matej Homola (SVK)	2
Matías Gómez (ESP)	3
Guillermo Gutiérrez (COL)	2
José Armando Luque (MEX)	4
Alejandro Jurado (ESA)	6
Maximiliano Larrosa (URU)	6
Andrés Madera (VEN)	1
Vinícius Figueira (BRA)	2

Round of 32
Firdovsi Farzaliyev (AZE)	1
Jason Ramil Macaalay (PHI)	0
Abdullah Shaaban (KUW)	2
Nur Halim Arlendi (INA)	2
Matías Gómez (ESP)	3
José Armando Luque (MEX)	1
Alejandro Jurado (ESA)	0
Vinícius Figueira (BRA)	1

Round of 16
Firdovsi Farzaliyev (AZE)	2
Abdullah Shaaban (KUW)	1
Matías Gómez (ESP)	2
Vinícius Figueira (BRA)	3

Quarterfinals
Firdovsi Farzaliyev (AZE)	1
Vinícius Figueira (BRA)	0

Pool 3

Round of 128
	Score	
Michael Panduleni Nakapandi (NAM)	0–3	Jess Rosiello (BEL)

Round of 64
Jess Rosiello (BEL)	2
Davit Pataridze (GEO)	1
Camilo Velozo (CHI)	5
Eudes Junecio Capenda (BUR)	0
Saliou Diouf (SEN)	1
Emil Pavlov (MKD)	1
Ryan O'Neil (CAN)	1
Sultan Al-Zahrani (KSA)	2
Nenad Dulović (MNE)	4
Fredrick Abubakar (KEN)	2
Brian Hilliard (USA)	0
Evgeny Plakhutin (ROC)	1
Shin Cheng-chung (TPE)	0
Ronen Gehtbarg (ISR)	1
Marcos Tsangaras (CYP)	1
Sadriddin Saymatov (UZB)	4

Round of 32
Jess Rosiello (BEL)	3
Camilo Velozo (CHI)	4
Emil Pavlov (MKD)	0
Sultan Al-Zahrani (KSA)	4
Nenad Dulović (MNE)	3
Evgeny Plakhutin (ROC)	4
Ronen Gehtbarg (ISR)	2
Sadriddin Saymatov (UZB)	3

Round of 16
Camilo Velozo (CHI)	5
Sultan Al-Zahrani (KSA)	5
Evgeny Plakhutin (ROC)	2
Sadriddin Saymatov (UZB)	0

Quarterfinals
Sultan Al-Zahrani (KSA)	0
Evgeny Plakhutin (ROC)	4

Pool 4

Round of 128
	Score	
Christos-Stefanos Xenos (GRE)	2–3	Abdelrahman Al-Masatfa (JOR)

Round of 64
Abdelrahman Al-Masatfa (JOR)	2
Vasil Rivov (BUL)	0
Amir Mehdi Zadeh (IRI)	4
Nader Azzouzi (TUN)	1
Supa Ngamphuengphit (THA)	2
David Kuhn (GER)	0
Stefan Pokorny (AUT)	5
Tomas Balčius (LTU)	0
Prem Kumar Selvam (MAS)	3
Casper Lidegaard (DEN)	2
Rory Kavanagh (IRL)	0
Diogo Ribeiro (POR)	3
Ahmed Al-Hadharim (UAE)	0
Miłosz Sabiecki (POL)	1
Oussama Edari (MAR)	1
Eray Şamdan (TUR)	5

Round of 32
Abdelrahman Al-Masatfa (JOR)	8
Amir Mehdi Zadeh (IRI)	1
Supa Ngamphuengphit (THA)	0
Stefan Pokorny (AUT)	1
Prem Kumar Selvam (MAS)	1
Diogo Ribeiro (POR)	0
Miłosz Sabiecki (POL)	0
Eray Şamdan (TUR)	5

Round of 16
Abdelrahman Al-Masatfa (JOR)	1
Stefan Pokorny (AUT)	0
Prem Kumar Selvam (MAS)	0
Eray Şamdan (TUR)	5

Quarterfinals
Abdelrahman Al-Masatfa (JOR)	1
Eray Şamdan (TUR)	3

Semifinals

Semifinals
Yves Martial Tadissi (HUN)	5
Firdovsi Farzaliyev (AZE)	2
Evgeny Plakhutin (ROC)	0
Eray Şamdan (TUR)	2

Repechage

Repechage round 1
Oussama Edari (MAR)	4
Miłosz Sabiecki (POL)	0
Gegham Nikoghosyan (ARM)	0
Stefan Joksić (SRB)	1

Repechage round 2
Oussama Edari (MAR)	4
Prem Kumar Selvam (MAS)	2
Stefan Joksić (SRB)	4
Boran Berak (CRO)	3

Repechage round 3
Oussama Edari (MAR)	1
Abdelrahman Al-Masatfa (JOR)	5
Stefan Joksić (SRB)	3
Jordan Thomas (GBR)	1

Repechage round 4
Abdelrahman Al-Masatfa (JOR)	5
Evgeny Plakhutin (ROC)	0
Stefan Joksić (SRB)	2
Firdovsi Farzaliyev (AZE)	3

Round-robin

Pos	Athlete	B	W	D	L	Pts	Score	(Turkey)	(Jordan)	(Azerbaijan)	(Hungary)
1	Eray Şamdan (TUR)	3	2	1	0	5	5–3	—	0–0	1–0	4–3
2	Abdelrahman Al-Masatfa (JOR)	3	1	2	0	4	4–0	0–0	—	0–0	4–0
3	Firdovsi Farzaliyev (AZE)	3	0	2	1	2	0–1	0–1	0–0	—	0–0
4	Yves Martial Tadissi (HUN)	3	0	1	2	1	3–8	3–4	0–4	0–0	—

==== 75 kg ====
Seeds

1. Thomas Scott (USA)
2. Abdalla Abdelaziz (EGY)
3. Erman Eltemur (TUR)
4. Károly Gábor Hárspataki (HUN)

Pool 1

Round of 128
	Score	
Dastonbek Otabolaev (UZB)	5–0	Abdourahmane Sene (SEN)
Jonas Friis-Pedersen (DEN)	2–7	Carlos Villarreal (MEX)

Round of 64
Dastonbek Otabolaev (UZB)	5
Walid Guezmil (TUN)	5
Hsu Wei-chun (TPE)	1
Logan Da Costa (FRA)	3
Jovanni Martínez (VEN)	9
Freddy Mwiya (NAM)	0
Cécil Jospin Lokossou (BEN)	0
Davit Makyan (ARM)	2
Carlos Villarreal (MEX)	2
Mario Hodžić (MNE)	1
Joaquín González (CHI)	5
Omar Al-Azmi (KSA)	2
Jáchym Tinavský (CZE)	1
Anderson Soriano (DOM)	3
Stefan Petkov (BUL)	1
Erman Eltemur (TUR)	2

Round of 32
Dastonbek Otabolaev (UZB)	7
Logan Da Costa (FRA)	6
Jovanni Martínez (VEN)	0
Davit Makyan (ARM)	5
Carlos Villarreal (MEX)	0
Joaquín González (CHI)	5
Anderson Soriano (DOM)	0
Erman Eltemur (TUR)	3

Round of 16
Dastonbek Otabolaev (UZB)	2
Davit Makyan (ARM)	0
Joaquín González (CHI)	1
Erman Eltemur (TUR)	3

Quarterfinals
Dastonbek Otabolaev (UZB)	1
Erman Eltemur (TUR)	1

Pool 2

Round of 128
	Score	
David Podsklan (SVK)	4–3	Aaro Tuominen (FIN)

Round of 64
David Podsklan (SVK)	0
Tsuneari Yahiro (AUS)	0
Julio Ichiki (ARG)	0
Noah Bitsch (GER)	1
Sharmendran Raghonathan (MAS)	2
Pi Jae-yoon (KOR)	2
Panayiotis Loizides (CYP)	4
Omar Al-Ajenaei (KUW)	2
Luca Rettenbacher (AUT)	5
Hamza Turulja (BIH)	0
Nurkanat Azhikanov (KAZ)	5
Christopher Crean McCarthy (IRL)	0
Juan Landázuri (COL)	1
Ivan Christopher Agustin (PHI)	0
Dionysios Xenos (GRE)	6
Abdalla Abdelaziz (EGY)	7

Round of 32
David Podsklan (SVK)	2
Noah Bitsch (GER)	4
Sharmendran Raghonathan (MAS)	5
Panayiotis Loizides (CYP)	0
Luca Rettenbacher (AUT)	4
Nurkanat Azhikanov (KAZ)	6
Juan Landázuri (COL)	1
Abdalla Abdelaziz (EGY)	4

Round of 16
Noah Bitsch (GER)	5
Sharmendran Raghonathan (MAS)	0
Nurkanat Azhikanov (KAZ)	6
Abdalla Abdelaziz (EGY)	1

Quarterfinals
Noah Bitsch (GER)	7
Nurkanat Azhikanov (KAZ)	0

Pool 3

Round of 128
	Score	
Jordan Neves (LUX)	1–2	Ivan Korabau (BLR)

Round of 64
Ivan Korabau (BLR)	6
Bekim Basha (ALB)	1
Alton Brown (JAM)	1
William Engman (SWE)	2
Quentin Mahauden (BEL)	8
Jean Roody Adescar (HAI)	0
Petar Zaborski (MKD)	1
Mohammad Reza Nikbakhsh (CAN)	0
Bernice Brice Sawadogo (BUR)	0
Lee Ka Wai (HKG)	8
Elhami Shabani (KOS)	3
Allan Maldonado (GUA)	0
Maciej Boguszewski (POL)	4
Ruslans Sadikovs (LAT)	2
Tomás Silva (POR)	0
Károly Gábor Hárspataki (HUN)	1

Round of 32
Ivan Korabau (BLR)	3
William Engman (SWE)	0
Quentin Mahauden (BEL)	2
Petar Zaborski (MKD)	1
Lee Ka Wai (HKG)	4
Elhami Shabani (KOS)	0
Maciej Boguszewski (POL)	2
Károly Gábor Hárspataki (HUN)	6

Round of 16
Ivan Korabau (BLR)	3
Quentin Mahauden (BEL)	6
Lee Ka Wai (HKG)	0
Károly Gábor Hárspataki (HUN)	1

Quarterfinals
Quentin Mahauden (BEL)	0
Károly Gábor Hárspataki (HUN)	4

Pool 4

Round of 128
	Score	
Pavel Artamonov (EST)	4–1	Saadi Abbas Jalbani (PAK)

Round of 64
Pavel Artamonov (EST)	0
Enes Garibović (CRO)	1
Yassine Sekouri (MAR)	0
Ernest Sharafutdinov (ROC)	1
Henri Vekua (GEO)	1
Joe Kellaway (GBR)	0
Ignatius Joshua Kandou (INA)	1
Timothy Petersen (NED)	3
Yanis Lardjane (ALG)	1
Jaka Gaal (SLO)	3
Bashar Al-Najjar (JOR)	4
Remigijus Jurgilaitis (LTU)	0
Ljubiša Marić (SRB)	3
Douglas Brose (BRA)	3
Tevita Tamanigaunatawamudu (FIJ)	0
Thomas Scott (USA)	4

Round of 32
Enes Garibović (CRO)	3
Ernest Sharafutdinov (ROC)	5
Henri Vekua (GEO)	0
Timothy Petersen (NED)	1
Jaka Gaal (SLO)	0
Bashar Al-Najjar (JOR)	2
Douglas Brose (BRA)	1
Thomas Scott (USA)	0

Round of 16
Ernest Sharafutdinov (ROC)	0
Timothy Petersen (NED)	2
Bashar Al-Najjar (JOR)	4
Douglas Brose (BRA)	0

Quarterfinals
Timothy Petersen (NED)	5
Bashar Al-Najjar (JOR)	5

Semifinals

Semifinals
Dastonbek Otabolaev (UZB)	0
Noah Bitsch (GER)	3
Károly Gábor Hárspataki (HUN)	2
Bashar Al-Najjar (JOR)	1

Repechage

Repechage round 1
Tomás Silva (POR)	1
Maciej Boguszewski (POL)	0
Julio Ichiki (ARG)	1
David Podsklan (SVK)	3

Repechage round 2
Tomás Silva (POR)	1
Lee Ka Wai (HKG)	4
David Podsklan (SVK)	0
Sharmendran Raghonathan (MAS)	2

Repechage round 3
Lee Ka Wai (HKG)	5
Quentin Mahauden (BEL)	8
Sharmendran Raghonathan (MAS)	1
Nurkanat Azhikanov (KAZ)	5

Repechage round 4
Quentin Mahauden (BEL)	3
Bashar Al-Najjar (JOR)	4
Nurkanat Azhikanov (KAZ)	3
Dastonbek Otabolaev (UZB)	2

Round-robin

Pos	Athlete	B	W	D	L	Pts	Score	(Kazakhstan)	(Germany)	(Hungary)	(Jordan)
1	Nurkanat Azhikanov (KAZ)	3	2	0	1	4	9–7	—	1–4	4–1	4–2
2	Noah Bitsch (GER)	3	1	1	1	3	6–4	4–1	—	0–0	2–3
3	Károly Gábor Hárspataki (HUN)	3	1	1	1	3	6–8	1–4	0–0	—	5–4
4	Bashar Al-Najjar (JOR)	3	1	0	2	2	9–11	2–4	3–2	4–5	—

==== +75 kg ====
Seeds

1. Gogita Arkania (GEO)
2. Daniyar Yuldashev (KAZ)
3. Valerii Chobotar (UKR)
4. Farouk Abdesselem (FRA)

Pool 1

Round of 128
	Score	
Aliaksei Vodchyts (BLR)	2–0	Adrian Lopez Salas (NOR)
Tareg Hamedi (KSA)	6–0	Vaidotas Dobrovolskis (LTU)

Round of 64
Aliaksei Vodchyts (BLR)	4
Björn Kulovuori (FIN)	4
Nabil Ech-Chaabi (MAR)	3
Asiman Gurbanli (AZE)	4
Rodrigo Rojas (CHI)	3
Jimmy Haag (SWE)	0
Karim Sifflet (LCA)	0
Brandon Ramírez (GUA)	3
Tareg Hamedi (KSA)	2
Daniel Gaysinsky (CAN)	2
Aleksandr Shcherban (RUS)	1
Anel Castillo (DOM)	5
Juan McCormick (MEX)	0
Adi Gyurík (SVK)	1
Teerawat Kangtong (THA)	0
Valerii Chobotar (UKR)	1

Round of 32
Aliaksei Vodchyts (BLR)	1
Asiman Gurbanli (AZE)	5
Rodrigo Rojas (CHI)	3
Brandon Ramírez (GUA)	1
Tareg Hamedi (KSA)	4
Anel Castillo (DOM)	0
Adi Gyurík (SVK)	5
Valerii Chobotar (UKR)	6

Round of 16
Asiman Gurbanli (AZE)	1
Rodrigo Rojas (CHI)	0
Tareg Hamedi (KSA)	6
Valerii Chobotar (UKR)	1

Quarterfinals
Asiman Gurbanli (AZE)	2
Tareg Hamedi (KSA)	9

Pool 2

Round of 128
	Score	
Brian Irr (USA)	0–3	Berat Jakupi (MKD)
Christopher Wambua (KEN)	3–0	Rodion Onciulenco (MDA)

Round of 64
Berat Jakupi (MKD)	1
Nikola Malović (MNE)	0
Slobodan Bitević (SRB)	0
Georgios Tzanos (GRE)	2
Robin Rettenbacher (AUT)	3
Dániel Molnár (HUN)	3
Ricardo Dieujuste (HAI)	3
Bruno Palla (MOZ)	0
Christopher Wambua (KEN)	0
Michele Martina (ITA)	1
Jakhonshokh Ibrokhimov (UZB)	2
Meris Muhović (BIH)	0
Hocine Daikhi (ALG)	6
Mathaios Stylianou (CYP)	0
Roberto Petrov (BUL)	0
Daniyar Yuldashev (KAZ)	8

Round of 32
Berat Jakupi (MKD)	5
Georgios Tzanos (GRE)	0
Dániel Molnár (HUN)	1
Ricardo Dieujuste (HAI)	0
Michele Martina (ITA)	3
Jakhonshokh Ibrokhimov (UZB)	0
Hocine Daikhi (ALG)	1
Daniyar Yuldashev (KAZ)	2

Round of 16
Berat Jakupi (MKD)	0
Dániel Molnár (HUN)	1
Michele Martina (ITA)	0
Daniyar Yuldashev (KAZ)	3

Quarterfinals
Dániel Molnár (HUN)	4
Daniyar Yuldashev (KAZ)	2

Pool 3

Round of 128
	Score	
Sulaiman Al-Mulla (UAE)	3–3	Filipe Alberto (BRA)
Jang Min-soo (KOR)	4–9	Mitchell Durham (AUS)

Round of 64
Filipe Alberto (BRA)	2
Franklin Mina (ECU)	1
Thameur Slimani (TUN)	7
Diego Lenis (COL)	0
Seán McCarthy Crean (IRL)	3
Daniel (INA)	2
Andrejs Ozerovs (LAT)	1
Michel Corbalan (DEN)	3
Mitchell Durham (AUS)	0
Morgan Moss (RSA)	2
Mazin Juaidi (JOR)	4
Freddy Valera (VEN)	1
Shvan Othman (IRQ)	5
Waleed Al-Noumas (KUW)	1
Greg Anderson (GBR)	0
Farouk Abdesselem (FRA)	4

Round of 32
Filipe Alberto (BRA)	2
Thameur Slimani (TUN)	6
Seán McCarthy Crean (IRL)	1
Michel Corbalan (DEN)	1
Morgan Moss (RSA)	0
Mazin Juaidi (JOR)	4
Shvan Othman (IRQ)	0
Farouk Abdesselem (FRA)	2

Round of 16
Thameur Slimani (TUN)	3
Seán McCarthy Crean (IRL)	0
Mazin Juaidi (JOR)	1
Farouk Abdesselem (FRA)	3

Quarterfinals
Thameur Slimani (TUN)	3
Farouk Abdesselem (FRA)	2

Pool 4

Round of 128
	Score	
Mohamed Ramadan (EGY)	6–3	Wu Chun-wei (TPE)

Round of 64
Mohamed Ramadan (EGY)	9
Stefan Joksimović (SLO)	1
Vlad Iorga (ROU)	2
Alvin Karaqi (ALB)	0
Khalid Hassanein (QAT)	0
Maciej Gębka (POL)	2
Herolind Nishevci (KOS)	1
Ahmad Abu Basal (ISR)	0
Felipe Reis (POR)	2
Sharief Afif (PHI)	0
Luca Costa (BEL)	2
Abdou Lahad Cisse (SEN)	1
Ondřej Bosák (CZE)	1
Tyron Lardy (NED)	3
Emmanuel Okimela (BUR)	0
Gogita Arkania (GEO)	3

Round of 32
Mohamed Ramadan (EGY)	1
Vlad Iorga (ROU)	0
Maciej Gębka (POL)	0
Herolind Nishevci (KOS)	2
Felipe Reis (POR)	3
Luca Costa (BEL)	4
Tyron Lardy (NED)	0
Gogita Arkania (GEO)	5

Round of 16
Mohamed Ramadan (EGY)	0
Herolind Nishevci (KOS)	1
Luca Costa (BEL)	0
Gogita Arkania (GEO)	1

Quarterfinals
Herolind Nishevci (KOS)	0
Gogita Arkania (GEO)	1

Semifinals

Semifinals
Tareg Hamedi (KSA)	6
Dániel Molnár (HUN)	2
Thameur Slimani (TUN)	0
Gogita Arkania (GEO)	1

Repechage

Repechage round 1
Vaidotas Dobrovolskis (LTU)	2
Daniel Gaysinsky (CAN)	7

Repechage round 2
Emmanuel Okimela (BUR)	2
Tyron Lardy (NED)	5
Daniel Gaysinsky (CAN)	5
Anel Castillo (DOM)	0

Repechage round 3
Tyron Lardy (NED)	4
Luca Costa (BEL)	0
Daniel Gaysinsky (CAN)	1
Valerii Chobotar (UKR)	0

Repechage round 4
Tyron Lardy (NED)	2
Herolind Nishevci (KOS)	0
Daniel Gaysinsky (CAN)	7
Asiman Gurbanli (AZE)	0

Repechage round 5
Tyron Lardy (NED)	4
Thameur Slimani (TUN)	3
Daniel Gaysinsky (CAN)	3
Dániel Molnár (HUN)	0

Round-robin

Pos	Athlete	B	W	D	L	Pts	Score	(Saudi Arabia)	(Georgia (country))	(Canada)	(Netherlands)
1	Tareg Hamedi (KSA)	3	2	1	0	5	13–7	—	0–0	9–6	4–1
2	Gogita Arkania (GEO)	3	1	2	0	4	2–1	0–0	—	2–1	0–0
3	Daniel Gaysinsky (CAN)	3	1	0	2	2	10–14	6–9	1–2	—	3–3
4	Tyron Lardy (NED)	3	0	1	2	1	4–7	1–4	0–0	3–3	—

=== Women ===
==== Kata ====
Seeds

1. Dilara Bozan (TUR)
2. Alexandrea Anacan (NZL)
3. Jasmin Jüttner (GER)
3. Alexandra Feracci (FRA)

Round 1

Pool 1		Pool 2		Pool 3		Pool 4	
Athlete	Total	Athlete	Total	Athlete	Total	Athlete	Total
Jasmin Jüttner (GER)	24.46	Alexandrea Anacan (NZL)	24.20	Fatemeh Sadeghi (IRI)	24.28	Dilara Bozan (TUR)	24.08
Krisda Putri Aprilia (INA)	23.54	Chien Hui-hsuan (TPE)	23.94	Alexandra Feracci (FRA)	23.94	Rita Ha Thi Ngo (CAN)	23.68
Kristin Wieninger (AUT)	23.34	Patrícia Esparteiro (POR)	23.34	Monsicha Sakulrattanatarar (THA)	23.08	Georgia Xenou (GRE)	22.98
Maryia Fursava (BLR)	22.64	Sanae Agalmam (MAR)	22.62	Veronika Míšková (CZE)	22.94	Sarah Sayed (EGY)	22.86
Sarah Kamijo Pangilinan (PHI)	22.38	Cristina Orbe (ECU)	22.60	Ingrid Aranda (PER)	22.92	Biserka Radulović (MNE)	22.80
Pamela Contreras (MEX)	22.14	Liya Koshkarbayeva (KAZ)	22.28	Andrea Armada (VEN)	22.34	Natalie Payne (GBR)	22.40
Nicole Mota (BRA)	21.88	Anna Shcherbina (RUS)	21.88	Laura Sterck (HUN)	22.08	Puleksenija Jovanovska (MKD)	21.86
Manal Kamilia Hadj Saïd (ALG)	21.68	Jana Vaňušaniková (SVK)	21.86	Gabriela Izaguirre (ESA)	21.34	Melinda Mark (SUI)	21.60
Samantha van Lokven (NED)	21.68	Ioanna Maria Sampani (AUS)	21.46	Kamila Bracikowska (POL)	20.98	Diana Turcu (ROU)	19.94
Neda Rezei (AZE)	21.18	Maša Simonič (SLO)	20.94	Úna Flynn (IRL)	18.28	Maxine Willemse (RSA)	19.74
Neeldje Mayvonne Swart (NAM)	18.68	Irene Bechane (MOZ)	19.02	Irene Galtung (NOR)	DNS	Izabella Tran (SWE)	19.66

Round 2

Pool 1		Pool 2	
Athlete	Total	Athlete	Total
Jasmin Jüttner (GER)	26.00	Fatemeh Sadeghi (IRI)	25.46
Sanae Agalmam (MAR)	25.28	Rita Ha Thi Ngo (CAN)	24.42
Krisda Putri Aprilia (INA)	24.68	Alexandra Feracci (FRA)	24.12
Chien Hui-hsuan (TPE)	24.46	Dilara Bozan (TUR)	24.08
Maryia Fursava (BLR)	24.26	Monsicha Sakulrattanatarar (THA)	23.78
Patrícia Esparteiro (POR)	23.88	Veronika Míšková (CZE)	23.20
Alexandrea Anacan (NZL)	23.74	Sarah Sayed (EGY)	22.98
Kristin Wieninger (AUT)	23.26	Georgia Xenou (GRE)	22.62

Round 3

Pool 1		Pool 2	
Athlete	Total	Athlete	Total
Jasmin Jüttner (GER)	26.56	Dilara Bozan (TUR)	25.08
Krisda Putri Aprilia (INA)	25.28	Alexandra Feracci (FRA)	24.60
Chien Hui-hsuan (TPE)	25.26	Fatemeh Sadeghi (IRI)	24.60
Sanae Agalmam (MAR)	24.80	Rita Ha Thi Ngo (CAN)	23.66

Round 4

Match 1		Match 2	
Athlete	Total	Athlete	Total
Alexandra Feracci (FRA)	25.60	Fatemeh Sadeghi (IRI)	25.60
Chien Hui-hsuan (TPE)	24.60	Krisda Putri Aprilia (INA)	24.68

Round-robin

Pos	Athlete	M	W	L	(Turkey)	(France)	(Germany)	(Iran)
1	Dilara Bozan (TUR)	3	3	0	—	25.42	26.00	25.62
2	Alexandra Feracci (FRA)	3	2	1	25.42	—	25.66	25.74
3	Jasmin Jüttner (GER)	3	1	2	25.20	25.32	—	25.14
4	Fatemeh Sadeghi (IRI)	3	0	3	24.54	25.12	24.98	—

==== 55 kg ====
Seeds

1. Jana Messerschmidt (GER)
2. Li Ranran (CHN)
3. Junna Tsukii (PHI)
4. Yassmin Hamdy (EGY)

Pool 1

Round of 64
Carlota Fernández (ESP)	5
Dominika Veisová (SVK)	0
Aicha Sayah (MAR)	2
Valentyna Zolotarova (JAM)	0
Jang So-young (KOR)	0
Moldir Zhangbyrbay (KAZ)	4
Tsang Yee Ting (HKG)	0
Bettina Plank (AUT)	2
Kathryn Campbell (CAN)	2
Trinity Allen (USA)	4
Valéria Kumizaki (BRA)	2
Merel Landman (NED)	1
Ivet Goranova (BUL)	5
Albulena Gervalla (KOS)	2

Round of 32
Carlota Fernández (ESP)	1
Aicha Sayah (MAR)	0
Moldir Zhangbyrbay (KAZ)	9
Bettina Plank (AUT)	1
Trinity Allen (USA)	0
Valéria Kumizaki (BRA)	1
Ivet Goranova (BUL)	2
Junna Tsukii (PHI)	1

Round of 16
Carlota Fernández (ESP)	1
Moldir Zhangbyrbay (KAZ)	2
Valéria Kumizaki (BRA)	2
Ivet Goranova (BUL)	2

Quarterfinals
Moldir Zhangbyrbay (KAZ)	5
Ivet Goranova (BUL)	1

Pool 2

Round of 64
Rotem Efroni (ISR)	0
Denisa Stanciu (ROU)	0
Alexandra Recchia (FRA)	7
Océanne Mylène Ganiero (BEN)	0
Alicia Hernández (MEX)	7
Hanne Michiels (BEL)	1
Kristīne Vīča (LAT)	0
Rose Wanjiku (KEN)	1
Widad Draou (ALG)	1
Jennifer Warling (LUX)	5
Maria Alexiadis (AUS)	0
Loren Zarei (SWE)	0

Round of 32
Rotem Efroni (ISR)	0
Alexandra Recchia (FRA)	0
Alicia Hernández (MEX)	0
Mairi Kerin (IRL)	0
Rose Wanjiku (KEN)	0
Jennifer Warling (LUX)	1
Loren Zarei (SWE)	1
Li Ranran (CHN)	4

Round of 16
Alexandra Recchia (FRA)	1
Alicia Hernández (MEX)	0
Jennifer Warling (LUX)	3
Li Ranran (CHN)	1

Quarterfinals
Alexandra Recchia (FRA)	0
Jennifer Warling (LUX)	1

Pool 3

Round of 64
Alessandra Hasani (CRO)	0
Carla Burkitt (GBR)	3
Simona Zaborska (MKD)	0
Yamila Benítez (ARG)	1
Cheili González (GUA)	0
Valentina Toro (CHI)	5
Cok Istri Agung Sanistyarani (INA)	4
Madhuri Poovanesan (MAS)	5
Adriana Crhonková (CZE)	1
Hawraa Al-Ajmi (UAE)	4
Maria Stoli (GRE)	2
Maya Schärer (SUI)	0
Stella Urango (COL)	0
Anna Chernysheva (ROC)	8

Round of 32
Carla Burkitt (GBR)	5
Yamila Benítez (ARG)	0
Valentina Toro (CHI)	1
Madhuri Poovanesan (MAS)	2
Hawraa Al-Ajmi (UAE)	1
Maria Stoli (GRE)	4
Anna Chernysheva (ROC)	1
Yassmin Hamdy (EGY)	0

Round of 16
Carla Burkitt (GBR)	1
Madhuri Poovanesan (MAS)	0
Maria Stoli (GRE)	0
Anna Chernysheva (ROC)	1

Quarterfinals
Carla Burkitt (GBR)	0
Anna Chernysheva (ROC)	8

Pool 4

Round of 64
Dorota Banaszczyk (POL)	3
Ilaha Gasimova (AZE)	2
Li Lirisman (EST)	2
Barbara Haberl (SLO)	0
Bakhriniso Babaeva (UZB)	0
Ana Villanueva (DOM)	0
Catarina Rodrigues (POR)	3
Jelena Milivojčević (SRB)	1
Réka Molnár (HUN)	1
Irina Sharykhina (BLR)	1
Alessandra Vindrola (PER)	0
Yorgelis Salazar (VEN)	9

Round of 32
Dorota Banaszczyk (POL)	4
Li Lirisman (EST)	3
Bakhriniso Babaeva (UZB)	1
Sara Cardin (ITA)	2
Catarina Rodrigues (POR)	2
Irina Sharykhina (BLR)	0
Yorgelis Salazar (VEN)	0
Jana Messerschmidt (GER)	1

Round of 16
Dorota Banaszczyk (POL)	1
Sara Cardin (ITA)	0
Catarina Rodrigues (POR)	0
Jana Messerschmidt (GER)	1

Quarterfinals
' Dorota Banaszczyk (POL)	1
Jana Messerschmidt (GER)	1

Semifinals

Semifinals
Moldir Zhangbyrbay (KAZ)	1
Jennifer Warling (LUX)	0
Anna Chernysheva (ROC)	6
Dorota Banaszczyk (POL)	2

Repechage

Repechage round 1
Stella Urango (COL)	1
Yassmin Hamdy (EGY)	9
Jang So-young (KOR)	4
Bettina Plank (AUT)	3

Repechage round 2
Yassmin Hamdy (EGY)	5
Maria Stoli (GRE)	0
Jang So-young (KOR)	2
Carlota Fernández (ESP)	3

Repechage round 3
Yassmin Hamdy (EGY)	1
Carla Burkitt (GBR)	2
Carlota Fernández (ESP)	2
Ivet Goranova (BUL)	2

Repechage round 4
Carla Burkitt (GBR)	0
Dorota Banaszczyk (POL)	7
Ivet Goranova (BUL)	4
Jennifer Warling (LUX)	2

Round-robin

Pos	Athlete	B	W	D	L	Pts	Score	(Bulgaria)	(Kazakhstan)	ROC	(Poland)
1	Ivet Goranova (BUL)	3	2	0	1	4	7–7	—	4–2	1–5	2–0
2	Moldir Zhangbyrbay (KAZ)	3	2	0	1	4	9–8	2–4	—	5–4	2–0
3	Anna Chernysheva (ROC)	3	1	1	1	3	9–6	5–1	4–5	—	0–0
4	Dorota Banaszczyk (POL)	3	0	1	2	1	0–4	0–2	0–2	0–0	—

==== 61 kg ====
Seeds

1. Leïla Heurtault (FRA)
2. Rozita Alipour (IRI)
3. Haya Jumaa (CAN)
4. Alexandra Grande (PER)

Pool 1

Round of 64
Elisa Au (USA)	0
Aseel Al-Naimi (JOR)	5
Anita Serogina (UKR)	3
Chennise Charles (TTO)	0
Sarah Al-Ameri (UAE)	1
Anna Miggou (GER)	3
Farida Abiyeva (AZE)	3
Jacqueline Factos (ECU)	1
Marija Luīze Muižniece (LAT)	1
Tihare Astudillo (CHI)	1
Nailya Gataullina (ROC)	5
Sevinch Rakhimova (UZB)	2
Ivana Kamenova (BUL)	4
Anna-Johanna Nilsson (SWE)	2

Round of 32
Aseel Al-Naimi (JOR)	0
Anita Serogina (UKR)	5
Anna Miggou (GER)	2
Farida Abiyeva (AZE)	2
Tihare Astudillo (CHI)	2
Nailya Gataullina (ROC)	0
Ivana Kamenova (BUL)	0
Haya Jumaa (CAN)	2

Round of 16
Anita Serogina (UKR)	5
Anna Miggou (GER)	0
Tihare Astudillo (CHI)	0
Haya Jumaa (CAN)	4

Quarterfinals
Anita Serogina (UKR)	4
Haya Jumaa (CAN)	2

Pool 2

Round of 64
Kristina Mah (AUS)	0
Veronika Kostovska (MKD)	6
Adelina Rama (KOS)	1
Ana Lenard (CRO)	6
Hwang Soo-hyun (KOR)	0
Ku Tsui-ping (TPE)	5
Kanini Muli (KEN)	0
Lucie Veithová (CZE)	1
Noémie Kornfeld (SUI)	0
Btissam Sadini (MAR)	2
Magatte Seck (SEN)	0
Janessa Fonseca (PUR)	2
Karina Díaz (DOM)	1
Cristina Ferrer (ESP)	2

Round of 32
Veronika Kostovska (MKD)	0
Ana Lenard (CRO)	1
Ku Tsui-ping (TPE)	5
Lucie Veithová (CZE)	3
Btissam Sadini (MAR)	2
Janessa Fonseca (PUR)	0
Cristina Ferrer (ESP)	0
Rozita Alipour (IRI)	3

Round of 16
Ana Lenard (CRO)	2
Ku Tsui-ping (TPE)	3
Btissam Sadini (MAR)	2
Rozita Alipour (IRI)	1

Quarterfinals
Ku Tsui-ping (TPE)	1
Btissam Sadini (MAR)	4

Pool 3

Round of 64
Bettina Alstadsæther (NOR)	0
Claudymar Garcés (VEN)	8
Dea Devina (INA)	1
Carolina Arsénio (POR)	4
Joane Orbon (PHI)	6
Anthea Stylianou (CYP)	3
Lejla Topalovic (AUT)	1
Aleksandra Ilankovic (HUN)	2
Nele De Vos (BEL)	2
Magdalena Godlewska (POL)	2
Tjaša Ristić (SLO)	5
María Renee Wong (GUA)	0
Lynn Snel (NED)	1
Xhunashi Caballero (MEX)	0

Round of 32
Claudymar Garcés (VEN)	10
Carolina Arsénio (POR)	0
Joane Orbon (PHI)	2
Aleksandra Ilankovic (HUN)	4
Nele De Vos (BEL)	3
Tjaša Ristić (SLO)	2
Lynn Snel (NED)	5
Alexandra Grande (PER)	0

Round of 16
Claudymar Garcés (VEN)	8
Aleksandra Ilankovic (HUN)	1
Nele De Vos (BEL)	1
Lynn Snel (NED)	3

Quarterfinals
Claudymar Garcés (VEN)	5
Lynn Snel (NED)	2

Pool 4

Round of 64
Arm Sukkiaw (THA)	0
Miruna Mălăuţă (ROU)	2
Laura Pasqua (ITA)	2
Sabina Zakharova (KAZ)	3
Kimberly Nelting (LUX)	1
Natalie Williams (GBR)	4
Chaima Midi (ALG)	3
Vasiliki Panetsidou (GRE)	1
Stephanie De Lima (BRA)	2
Monica Kauppi (FIN)	0
Ingrida Suchánková (SVK)	9
Marinela Rosa Muchanga (MOZ)	1

Round of 32
Miruna Mălăuţă (ROU)	0
Sabina Zakharova (KAZ)	2
Natalie Williams (GBR)	1
Diana Ramírez (COL)	0
Chaima Midi (ALG)	1
Stephanie De Lima (BRA)	3
Ingrida Suchánková (SVK)	2
Leïla Heurtault (FRA)	4

Round of 16
Sabina Zakharova (KAZ)	8
Natalie Williams (GBR)	0
Stephanie De Lima (BRA)	0
Leïla Heurtault (FRA)	2

Quarterfinals
Sabina Zakharova (KAZ)	5
Leïla Heurtault (FRA)	1

Semifinals

Semifinals
Anita Serogina (UKR)	1
Btissam Sadini (MAR)	1
Claudymar Garcés (VEN)	3
Sabina Zakharova (KAZ)	3

Repechage

Repechage round 1
Noémie Kornfeld (SUI)	0
Janessa Fonseca (PUR)	1
Bettina Alstadsæther (NOR)	3
Carolina Arsénio (POR)	2

Repechage round 2
Janessa Fonseca (PUR)	4
Rozita Alipour (IRI)	0
Bettina Alstadsæther (NOR)	2
Aleksandra Ilankovic (HUN)	3

Repechage round 3
Janessa Fonseca (PUR)	7
Ku Tsui-ping (TPE)	3
Aleksandra Ilankovic (HUN)	4
Lynn Snel (NED)	0

Repechage round 4
Janessa Fonseca (PUR)	0
Anita Serogina (UKR)	2
Aleksandra Ilankovic (HUN)	1
Sabina Zakharova (KAZ)	2

Round-robin

Pos	Athlete	B	W	D	L	Pts	Score	(Morocco)	(Ukraine)	(Venezuela)	(Kazakhstan)
1	Btissam Sadini (MAR)	3	2	1	0	5	6–0	—	0–0	5–0	1–0
2	Anita Serogina (UKR)	3	2	1	0	5	3–0	0–0	—	2–0	1–0
3	Claudymar Garcés (VEN)	3	1	0	2	2	9–13	0–5	0–2	—	9–6
4	Sabina Zakharova (KAZ)	3	0	0	3	0	6–11	0–1	0–1	6–9	—

==== +61 kg ====
Seeds

1. Feryal Abdelaziz (EGY)
2. Elena Quirici (SUI)
3. Eleni Chatziliadou (GRE)
4. Sofya Berultseva (KAZ)

Pool 1

Round of 64
Justine Collins (IRL)	0
Dildora Alikulova (UZB)	8
Miroslava Kopúňová (SVK)	7
Wen Tzu-hsuan (TPE)	0
Irene Bechane (MOZ)	4
Lucija Lesjak (CRO)	10
Marina Radičević (SRB)	2
Silvia Semeraro (ITA)	3
Titta Keinänen (FIN)	5
Amelia Harvey (GBR)	0
Pamela Rodríguez (DOM)	0
Lamya Matoub (ALG)	1
Alizée Agier (FRA)	0
Johanna Kneer (GER)	3
Kiti Smiljan (SLO)	0
Eleni Chatziliadou (GRE)	10

Round of 32
Dildora Alikulova (UZB)	0
Miroslava Kopúňová (SVK)	8
Lucija Lesjak (CRO)	1
Silvia Semeraro (ITA)	3
Titta Keinänen (FIN)	1
Lamya Matoub (ALG)	1
Johanna Kneer (GER)	4
Eleni Chatziliadou (GRE)	0

Round of 16
Miroslava Kopúňová (SVK)	3
Silvia Semeraro (ITA)	7
Titta Keinänen (FIN)	3
Johanna Kneer (GER)	7

Quarterfinals
Silvia Semeraro (ITA)	1
Johanna Kneer (GER)	0

Pool 2

Round of 64
María Torres (ESP)	2
Fortesa Orana (KOS)	3
Amy Thomason (NZL)	3
Angela Mojsovska (MKD)	9
Chehinez Jemi (TUN)	4
Marianth Cuervo (VEN)	0
Alisa Buchinger (AUT)	2
Jamie Lim (PHI)	3
Theodosia Giamouki (CYP)	0
Guadalupe Quintal (MEX)	9
Fatima-Zahra Chajai (MAR)	3
Luana Debatty (BEL)	2
Martina Šáchová (CZE)	3
Ana Rita Oliveira (POR)	0

Round of 32
Fortesa Orana (KOS)	6
Angela Mojsovska (MKD)	0
Chehinez Jemi (TUN)	7
Jamie Lim (PHI)	2
Guadalupe Quintal (MEX)	4
Fatima-Zahra Chajai (MAR)	3
Martina Šáchová (CZE)	0
Elena Quirici (SUI)	5

Round of 16
Fortesa Orana (KOS)	0
Chehinez Jemi (TUN)	5
Guadalupe Quintal (MEX)	1
Elena Quirici (SUI)	3

Quarterfinals
Chehinez Jemi (TUN)	0
Elena Quirici (SUI)	2

Pool 3

Round of 64
Valeria Echever (ECU)	5
Ceyco Georgia Zefanya (INA)	6
Melissa Bratic (CAN)	2
Dorottya Pap (HUN)	0
Phanice Shisia (KEN)	1
Andrine Hilton (NOR)	7
Katrine Pedersen (DEN)	3
Meghan Smit (RSA)	7
Halyna Melnyk (UKR)	6
Ciska van der Voort (NED)	0
Marina Raković (MNE)	3
Hana Antunovic (SWE)	2
Victoria Isaeva (ROC)	4
Cirrus Lingl (USA)	1
Anita Makyan (ARM)	2
Sofya Berultseva (KAZ)	3

Round of 32
Ceyco Georgia Zefanya (INA)	3
Melissa Bratic (CAN)	4
Andrine Hilton (NOR)	1
Meghan Smit (RSA)	0
Halyna Melnyk (UKR)	2
Marina Raković (MNE)	3
Victoria Isaeva (ROC)	1
Sofya Berultseva (KAZ)	2

Round of 16
Melissa Bratic (CAN)	3
Andrine Hilton (NOR)	0
Marina Raković (MNE)	2
Sofya Berultseva (KAZ)	2

Quarterfinals
Melissa Bratic (CAN)	3
Sofya Berultseva (KAZ)	0

Pool 4

Round of 64
Wong Cheuk Lee (HKG)	9
Suzelle Pronk (NAM)	0
Rebecca Sullivan (AUS)	0
Ivona Ćavar (BIH)	1
Wiktoria Grejner (POL)	1
Isabel Aco (PER)	0
Viktorija Rezajeva (LAT)	2
Aleksandra Stubleva (BUL)	3
Maryia Aliakseyeva (BLR)	0
Brenda Padilha (BRA)	5
Maman Amina Dione (SEN)	1
Pola Giorgetti (LUX)	1
Claudia Ionita (ROU)	3
Shanee Torres (COL)	1

Round of 32
Wong Cheuk Lee (HKG)	0
Ivona Ćavar (BIH)	4
Wiktoria Grejner (POL)	0
Aleksandra Stubleva (BUL)	3
Brenda Padilha (BRA)	5
Maman Amina Dione (SEN)	0
Claudia Ionita (ROU)	1
Feryal Abdelaziz (EGY)	2

Round of 16
Ivona Ćavar (BIH)	1
Aleksandra Stubleva (BUL)	0
Brenda Padilha (BRA)	0
Feryal Abdelaziz (EGY)	5

Quarterfinals
Ivona Ćavar (BIH)	0
Feryal Abdelaziz (EGY)	2

Semifinals

Semifinals
Silvia Semeraro (ITA)	5
Elena Quirici (SUI)	0
Melissa Bratic (CAN)	1
Feryal Abdelaziz (EGY)	3

Repechage

Repechage round 1
Marina Radičević (SRB)	0
Lucija Lesjak (CRO)	2

Repechage round 2
Lucija Lesjak (CRO)	3
Miroslava Kopúňová (SVK)	2
Claudia Ionita (ROU)	1
Brenda Padilha (BRA)	0

Repechage round 3
Lucija Lesjak (CRO)	3
Johanna Kneer (GER)	3
Claudia Ionita (ROU)	1
Ivona Ćavar (BIH)	1

Repechage round 4
Lucija Lesjak (CRO)	1
Elena Quirici (SUI)	2
Claudia Ionita (ROU)	2
Melissa Bratic (CAN)	5

Round-robin

Pos	Athlete	B	W	D	L	Pts	Score	(Switzerland)	(Italy)	(Egypt)	(Canada)
1	Elena Quirici (SUI)	3	3	0	0	6	5–2	—	2–1	2–1	1–0
2	Silvia Semeraro (ITA)	3	2	0	1	4	8–2	1–2	—	3–0	4–0
3	Feryal Abdelaziz (EGY)	3	1	0	2	2	3–5	1–2	0–3	—	2–0
4	Melissa Bratic (CAN)	3	0	0	3	0	0–7	0–1	0–4	0–2	—
