= Farida Abiyeva =

Azerbaijani karateka (born 1995)

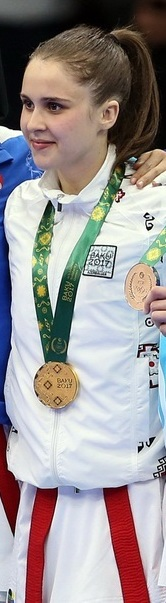
- Abiyeva at the 2017 Islamic Solidarity Games
- Born: Baku

Farida Abiyeva ( March 20, 1995, Baku, Azerbaijan) is an Azerbaijani karateka. Farida Abiyeva won a gold medal at the 2017 Islamic Solidarity Games held in Baku, Azerbaijan.

== Life ==
Farida Abiyeva was born on March 20, 1995, in Baku. She entered the Faculty of Philology at Baku State University in 2013 and graduated from there in 2017.

== Career ==
Farida is currently a military servicemember of the State Border Service. She is a lieutenant in the border army and an officer coach at the Border Guard Sports Center. The chief of the State Border Service, Colonel General Elchin Guliev, received all the karate athletes who competed in the European Games. During this event, Farida Abiyeva was awarded the rank of junior lieutenant. In May 2016, Abiyeva became a European champion as part of the Azerbaijani national team in the team competition. Her rank was promoted to lieutenant in October.

In 2017, Farida Abiyeva participated in the 4th Islamic Solidarity Games under the flag of Azerbaijan. Competing in the -61 kilogram weight category, Farida Abiyeva defeated the Iranian representative Rozita Alipour with a score of 3:0 in the final match and won the gold medal.

In 2021, she competed at the World Olympic Qualification Tournament held in Paris, France hoping to qualify for the 2020 Summer Olympics in Tokyo, Japan.
