= 2021 European Karate Championships =

- Venue: Žatika Sport Centre
- Location: Poreč, Croatia
- Dates: 19–23 May
- Competitors: 513 from 47 nations

The 2021 European Karate Championships was the 56th edition of the European Karate Championships and 3rd European Para Karate Championships, and was held in Poreč, Croatia from 19 to 23 May 2021.

== Medal table ==
* Host nation (Croatia)

Rank	Nation	Gold	Silver	Bronze	Total
1	Turkey	6	2	1	9
2	Germany	2	2	1	5
3	Spain	1	3	0	4
4	Azerbaijan	1	2	1	4
5	Greece	1	1	3	5
6	Russia	1	1	2	4
6	Ukraine	1	1	2	4
8	Serbia	1	1	0	2
9	Italy	1	0	5	6
10	Croatia*	1	0	2	3
11	Montenegro	0	1	1	2
12	Bulgaria	0	1	0	1
12	Latvia	0	1	0	1
14	France	0	0	4	4
15	Slovakia	0	0	2	2
15	Switzerland	0	0	2	2
17	Austria	0	0	1	1
17	Belarus	0	0	1	1
17	Czech Republic	0	0	1	1
17	Denmark	0	0	1	1
17	Kosovo	0	0	1	1
17	Portugal	0	0	1	1
Totals (22 entries)		16	16	32	64

== Medalists ==
=== Men ===
Event	Gold	Silver	Bronze
Kata	Ali Sofuoğlu; Turkey	Damián Quintero; Spain	Yuki Ujihara; Switzerland
Kata	Ali Sofuoğlu; Turkey	Damián Quintero; Spain	Mattia Busato; Italy
Team kata	Turkey; Emre Vefa Göktaş; Enes Özdemir; Ali Sofuoğlu	Spain; Sergio Galán; Alejandro Manzana; Raúl Martín	Italy; Gianluca Gallo; Alessandro Iodice; Giuseppe Panagia
Team kata	Turkey; Emre Vefa Göktaş; Enes Özdemir; Ali Sofuoğlu	Spain; Sergio Galán; Alejandro Manzana; Raúl Martín	Russia; Maksim Ksenofontov; Mehman Rzaev; Emil Skovorodnikov
Kumite −60 kg	Eray Şamdan; Turkey	Kalvis Kalniņš; Latvia	Iurik Ogannisian; Russia
Kumite −60 kg	Eray Şamdan; Turkey	Kalvis Kalniņš; Latvia	Christos-Stefanos Xenos; Greece
Kumite −67 kg	Dionysios Xenos; Greece	Evgeny Plakhutin; Russia	Stefan Pokorny; Austria
Kumite −67 kg	Dionysios Xenos; Greece	Evgeny Plakhutin; Russia	Steven Da Costa; France
Kumite −75 kg	Stanislav Horuna; Ukraine	Rafael Aghayev; Azerbaijan	Noah Bitsch; Germany
Kumite −75 kg	Stanislav Horuna; Ukraine	Rafael Aghayev; Azerbaijan	Enes Garibović; Croatia
Kumite −84 kg	Uğur Aktaş; Turkey	Panah Abdullayev; Azerbaijan	Michele Martina; Italy
Kumite −84 kg	Uğur Aktaş; Turkey	Panah Abdullayev; Azerbaijan	Adi Gyurík; Slovakia
Kumite +84 kg	Jonathan Horne; Germany	Slobodan Bitević; Serbia	Herolind Nishevci; Kosovo
Kumite +84 kg	Jonathan Horne; Germany	Slobodan Bitević; Serbia	Georgios Tzanos; Greece
Team kumite	Croatia; Enes Garibović; Anđelo Kvesić; Ivan Kvesić; Ivan Martinac; Ante Mrvičić; Karlo Raguž; Zvonimir Živković	Montenegro; Nenad Dulović; Andrija Fatić; Mario Hodžić; Nikola Malović; Balša Miličković; Predrag Smolović	Ukraine; Valerii Chobotar; Stanislav Horuna; Ihor Lahunov; Ryzvan Talibov; Andrii Toroshanko; Kostiantyn Tsymbal; Andrii Zaplitnyi
Team kumite	Croatia; Enes Garibović; Anđelo Kvesić; Ivan Kvesić; Ivan Martinac; Ante Mrvičić; Karlo Raguž; Zvonimir Živković	Montenegro; Nenad Dulović; Andrija Fatić; Mario Hodžić; Nikola Malović; Balša Miličković; Predrag Smolović	Azerbaijan; Panah Abdullayev; Tural Aghalarzade; Rafael Aghayev; Asiman Gurbanli; Rafiz Hasanov; Turgut Hasanov; Aykhan Mamayev

=== Women ===
Event	Gold	Silver	Bronze
Kata	Sandra Sánchez; Spain	Dilara Bozan; Turkey	Viviana Bottaro; Italy
Kata	Sandra Sánchez; Spain	Dilara Bozan; Turkey	Veronika Mišková; Czech Republic
Team kata	Italy; Carola Casale; Terryana D'Onofrio; Michela Pezzetti	Spain; Marta García; Lidia Rodríguez; Raquel Roy	Portugal; Mariana Belo; Ana Cruz; Patrícia Esparteiro
Team kata	Italy; Carola Casale; Terryana D'Onofrio; Michela Pezzetti	Spain; Marta García; Lidia Rodríguez; Raquel Roy	France; Lætitia Feracci; Louise Frieh; Laura Pieri
Kumite −50 kg	Serap Özçelik; Turkey	Shara Hubrich; Germany	Alexandra Recchia; France
Kumite −50 kg	Serap Özçelik; Turkey	Shara Hubrich; Germany	Kateryna Kryva; Ukraine
Kumite −55 kg	Anna Chernysheva; Russia	Jana Messerschmidt; Germany	Jelena Maksimović; Montenegro
Kumite −55 kg	Anna Chernysheva; Russia	Jana Messerschmidt; Germany	Irina Sharykhina; Belarus
Kumite −61 kg	Jovana Preković; Serbia	Anita Serogina; Ukraine	Ingrida Suchánková; Slovakia
Kumite −61 kg	Jovana Preković; Serbia	Anita Serogina; Ukraine	Leïla Heurtault; France
Kumite −68 kg	Irina Zaretska; Azerbaijan	Vasiliki Panetsidou; Greece	Eda Eltemur; Turkey
Kumite −68 kg	Irina Zaretska; Azerbaijan	Vasiliki Panetsidou; Greece	Katrine Pedersen; Denmark
Kumite +68 kg	Meltem Hocaoğlu; Turkey	Aleksandra Stubleva; Bulgaria	Eleni Chatziliadou; Greece
Kumite +68 kg	Meltem Hocaoğlu; Turkey	Aleksandra Stubleva; Bulgaria	Ramona Brüderlin; Switzerland
Team kumite	Germany; Shara Hubrich; Johanna Kneer; Jana Messerschmidt; Anna Miggou	Turkey; Merve Çoban; Gülsen Demirtürk; Eda Eltemur; Meltem Hocaoğlu	Italy; Lorena Busà; Clio Ferracuti; Alessandra Mangiacapra; Silvia Semeraro
Team kumite	Germany; Shara Hubrich; Johanna Kneer; Jana Messerschmidt; Anna Miggou	Turkey; Merve Çoban; Gülsen Demirtürk; Eda Eltemur; Meltem Hocaoğlu	Croatia; Ana Lenard; Lucija Lesjak; Lea Vukoja; Mia Greta Zorko

== Participating nations ==
513 athletes from 47 nations competed.

- Albania (6)
- Armenia (8)
- Austria (11)
- Azerbaijan (15)
- Belarus (12)
- Belgium (11)
- Bosnia and Herzegovina (15)
- Bulgaria (8)
- Croatia (16)
- Cyprus (10)
- Czech Republic (12)
- Denmark (10)
- England (7)
- Estonia (3)
- Finland (11)
- France (16)
- Georgia (5)
- Germany (15)
- Greece (13)
- Hungary (13)
- Ireland (2)
- Israel (7)
- Italy (16)
- Kosovo (14)
- Latvia (13)
- Liechtenstein (2)
- Lithuania (8)
- Luxembourg (8)
- Moldova (1)
- Montenegro (15)
- Netherlands (11)
- North Macedonia (15)
- Norway (5)
- Poland (16)
- Portugal (16)
- Romania (14)
- Russia (16)
- San Marino (2)
- Scotland (3)
- Serbia (15)
- Slovakia (16)
- Slovenia (14)
- Spain (16)
- Sweden (10)
- Switzerland (12)
- Turkey (15)
- Ukraine (14)

== Para-Karate ==
Event	Gold	Silver	Bronze
Men's K-10	Dorin Alexe; Romania	Alexei Nurkenov; Russia	Sahib Ahadov; Azerbaijan
Men's K-10	Dorin Alexe; Romania	Alexei Nurkenov; Russia	Valeriy Trofimov; Russia
Men's K-21	Ruiz Carlos Huertas; Spain	János Csatári; Hungary	Albert Singer; Germany
Men's K-21	Ruiz Carlos Huertas; Spain	János Csatári; Hungary	Antonio Pereira; Portugal
Men's K-22	Víctor Manuel Arevalo; Spain	João Estrela Azevedo; Portugal	Boris Kasumović; Bosnia and Herzegovina
Men's K-22	Víctor Manuel Arevalo; Spain	João Estrela Azevedo; Portugal	Marvin Nöltge; Germany
Men's K-30	Juan Antonio Fuentes; Spain	Vicente Yangüez Santalla; Spain	Eldar Ahmadov; Azerbaijan
Men's K-30	Juan Antonio Fuentes; Spain	Vicente Yangüez Santalla; Spain	Volodymyr Turko; Ukraine
Women's K-10	Emiliya Mitlinova; Azerbaijan	Karmen Vask; Estonia	None awarded
Women's K-21	Olívia Kákosy; Hungary	Lucía Sánchez Rosado; Spain	Nina Fell; Germany
Women's K-22	María De León Lopez; Spain	Diandra Bekčić; Slovenia	Daniela Topic; Croatia
Women's K-22	María De León Lopez; Spain	Diandra Bekčić; Slovenia	Tijana Stamenović; Serbia
Women's K-30	Isabel Fernandez Jimenez; Spain	Knarik Airapetian; Ukraine	Nina Portolan; Serbia

=== Medal table ===
* Host nation (Croatia)

Rank	Nation	Gold	Silver	Bronze	Total
1	Spain	5	2	0	7
2	Hungary	1	1	0	2
3	Azerbaijan	1	0	2	3
4	Romania	1	0	0	1
5	Russia	0	1	2	3
6	Portugal	0	1	1	2
6	Ukraine	0	1	1	2
8	Estonia	0	1	0	1
8	Slovenia	0	1	0	1
10	Germany	0	0	3	3
11	Serbia	0	0	2	2
12	Bosnia and Herzegovina	0	0	1	1
12	Croatia*	0	0	1	1
Totals (13 entries)		8	8	13	29

=== Participating nations ===
49 athletes from 16 nations competed.

- Azerbaijan (5)
- Bosnia and Herzegovina (1)
- Croatia (4)
- Estonia (1)
- Georgia (2)
- Germany (4)
- Hungary (3)
- Kosovo (1)
- Latvia (1)
- Portugal (2)
- Romania (1)
- Russia (9)
- Serbia (2)
- Slovenia (1)
- Spain (8)
- Ukraine (4)
