= Karate at the 2022 Mediterranean Games – Women's 68 kg =

Women's kumite 68 kg at the 2022 Mediterranean Games
- Venue: Mohammed ben Ahmed CCO Hall 03 and 06
- Date: 27 June
- Competitors: 11 from 11 nations

Medalists
gold medal	Feryal Abdelaziz	Egypt
silver medal	Silvia Semeraro	Italy
bronze medal	Nissrine Brouk	Morocco
bronze medal	Eda Eltemur	Turkey

The women's 68 kg competition in karate at the 2022 Mediterranean Games was held on 27 June at the Mohammed ben Ahmed CCO Hall 03 and 06 in Oran.

== Results ==
=== Bracket ===
Round of 16
Adriana Gil (ESP)	0
Nissrine Brouk (MAR)	0
Vasiliki Panetsidou (GRE)	0
Ivona Ćavar (BIH)	0
Natanaële Flamand (FRA)	4
Karima Mekkaoui (ALG)	1

Quarterfinals
Nissrine Brouk (MAR)	5
Marina Radičević (SRB)	3
Vasiliki Panetsidou (GRE)	0
Feryal Abdelaziz (EGY)	2
Natanaële Flamand (FRA)	3
Eda Eltemur (TUR)	4
Kiti Smiljan (SLO)	0
Silvia Semeraro (ITA)	4

Semifinals
Nissrine Brouk (MAR)	1
Feryal Abdelaziz (EGY)	2
Eda Eltemur (TUR)	1
Silvia Semeraro (ITA)	1

Final
Feryal Abdelaziz (EGY)	2
Silvia Semeraro (ITA)	0

=== Repechage ===
Bronze medal
Vasiliki Panetsidou (GRE)	3
Nissrine Brouk (MAR)	3

Bronze medal
Kiti Smiljan (SLO)	3
Eda Eltemur (TUR)	8
