= Yassmin Hamdy =

Egyptian karateka (born 1993)

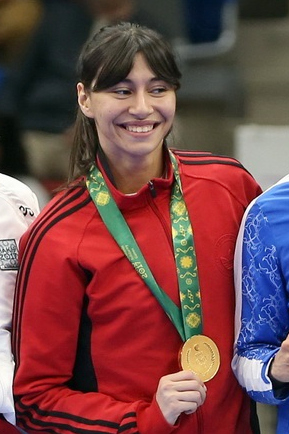
- Hamdy at the 2017 Islamic Solidarity Games
- Style: Karate, kumite

Yassmin Hamdy Bayoumy Attia born: November 4, 1993, is an Egyptian karateka, who competes in the kumite 55 kg division.

== Awards ==
She won three medals at the world championships in 2012–2016, including a team gold in 2014 and an individual bronze in 2012. She also won an individual bronze medal at the 2013 World Games.

International career

In 2021, she competed at the World Olympic Qualification Tournament held in Paris, France hoping to qualify for the 2020 Summer Olympics in Tokyo, Japan.
