= Karate at the 2019 European Games – Women's kumite 68 kg =

Sporting event

Women's kumite 68 kg at the 2019 European Games
- Venue: Čyžoŭka-Arena
- Date: 29 June
- Competitors: 8 from 8 nations

Medalists
gold medal	Silvia Semeraro	Italy
silver medal	Irina Zaretska	Azerbaijan
bronze medal	Halyna Melnyk	Ukraine
bronze medal	Elena Quirici	Switzerland

The women's kumite 68 kg competition at the 2019 European Games in Minsk was held on 29 June 2019 at the Čyžoŭka-Arena.

== Schedule ==
All times are local (UTC+3).

Date	Time	Event
Saturday, 29 June 2019	10:55	Elimination round
Saturday, 29 June 2019	16:15	Semifinals
Saturday, 29 June 2019	18:03	Final

== Results ==
=== Elimination round ===
==== Group A ====
Rank	Athlete	B	W	D	L	Pts	Score
1	Irina Zaretska (AZE)	3	2	1	0	5	13–2
2	Silvia Semeraro (ITA)	3	2	1	0	5	10–1
3	Alizée Agier (FRA)	3	1	0	2	2	4–12
4	Miroslava Kopúňová (SVK)	3	0	0	3	0	1–13

	Score	
Alizée Agier (FRA)	2–0	Miroslava Kopúňová (SVK)
Silvia Semeraro (ITA)	0–0	Irina Zaretska (AZE)
Silvia Semeraro (ITA)	5–1	Miroslava Kopúňová (SVK)
Alizée Agier (FRA)	2–7	Irina Zaretska (AZE)
Irina Zaretska (AZE)	6–0	Miroslava Kopúňová (SVK)
Alizée Agier (FRA)	0–5	Silvia Semeraro (ITA)

==== Group B ====
Rank	Athlete	B	W	D	L	Pts	Score
1	Elena Quirici (SUI)	3	3	0	0	6	6–0
2	Halyna Melnyk (UKR)	3	1	1	1	3	4–2
3	Maryia Aliakseyeva (BLR)	3	1	0	2	2	3–9
4	Katrine Pedersen (DEN)	3	0	1	2	1	1–3

	Score	
Elena Quirici (SUI)	4–0	Maryia Aliakseyeva (BLR)
Halyna Melnyk (UKR)	0–0	Katrine Pedersen (DEN)
Halyna Melnyk (UKR)	4–1	Maryia Aliakseyeva (BLR)
Elena Quirici (SUI)	1–0	Katrine Pedersen (DEN)
Katrine Pedersen (DEN)	1–2	Maryia Aliakseyeva (BLR)
Elena Quirici (SUI)	1–0	Halyna Melnyk (UKR)

=== Finals ===
Semifinals
Irina Zaretska (AZE)	1
Halyna Melnyk (UKR)	0
Elena Quirici (SUI)	1
Silvia Semeraro (ITA)	4

Final
Irina Zaretska (AZE)	1
Silvia Semeraro (ITA)	5
