= Katrine Pedersen (karateka) =

Danish karateka (born 1996)

Personal information
- Born: 5 April 1996 (age 30)

Sport
- Country: Denmark
- Sport: Karate
- Weight class: 68 kg
- Event: Kumite
Medal record
Women's karate
Representing Denmark
World Championships
Silver medal – second place	2016 Linz	Kumite 68 kg
European Championships
Bronze medal – third place	2019 Guadalajara	Kumite 68 kg
Bronze medal – third place	2021 Poreč	Kumite 68 kg

Katrine Pedersen (born 5 April 1996) is a Danish karateka. She won the silver medal in the women's kumite 68 kg at the 2016 World Karate Championships in Linz, Austria. She is also a two-time bronze medalist in this event at the European Karate Championships.

== Career ==
At the 2017 World Games held in Wrocław, Poland, Pedersen competed in the women's kumite 68 kg event where she lost her bronze medal match against Kayo Someya of Japan.

In 2019, Pedersen competed in the women's kumite 68 kg event at the European Games held in Minsk, Belarus. She did not win a match in her group and she did not advance to the semi-finals.

In 2021, Pedersen competed at the World Olympic Qualification Tournament held in Paris, France hoping to qualify for the 2020 Summer Olympics in Tokyo, Japan.

== Achievements ==
Year	Competition	Venue	Rank	Event
2016	World Championships	Linz, Austria	2nd	Kumite 68 kg
2019	European Championships	Guadalajara, Spain	3rd	Kumite 68 kg
2021	European Championships	Poreč, Croatia	3rd	Kumite 68 kg
