= Karate at the 2020 Summer Olympics – Women's +61 kg =

Karate competition

Women's kumite +61 kg at the Games of the XXXII Olympiad
- Venue: Nippon Budokan
- Date: 7 August 2021
- Competitors: 10 from 10 nations

Medalists
| 1st place, gold medalist(s) | | Feryal Abdelaziz | Egypt |
| 2nd place, silver medalist(s) | | Irina Zaretska | Azerbaijan |
| 3rd place, bronze medalist(s) | | Gong Li | China |
| 3rd place, bronze medalist(s) | | Sofya Berultseva | Kazakhstan |

The women's kumite +61 kg competition in Karate at the 2020 Summer Olympics was held on 7 August 2021 at the Nippon Budokan.

== Competition format ==
The competition began with a two-pool round-robin stage followed by a single elimination stage. Each pool consisted of five athletes, with those positioned 1st and 4th seeded to Pool A, and those positioned 2nd and 3rd to Pool B. The athlete that finished first in Pool A faced the athlete that finished second in Pool B in the semifinals, and vice versa. There were no bronze medal matches in the kumite events. Losers of the semifinals each received a bronze medal.

== Schedule ==
All times are in local time (UTC+9).

| Date | Time | Round |
|---|---|---|
| Saturday, 7 August 2021 | 14:00; 19:20; 19:55; 20:15 | Pool stage Semifinals; Gold medal match Victory ceremony |

== Results ==
=== Pool stage ===
Pool A

| Athlete | Pld | W | D | L | Pts | Qualification |
|---|---|---|---|---|---|---|
| Irina Zaretska (AZE) | 4 | 3 | 0 | 1 | 6 | Semifinals |
| Sofya Berultseva (KAZ) | 4 | 2 | 1 | 1 | 5 | Semifinals |
| Silvia Semeraro (ITA) | 4 | 2 | 0 | 2 | 4 | |
| Ayumi Uekusa (JPN) | 4 | 2 | 0 | 2 | 4 | |
| Meltem Hocaoğlu (TUR) | 4 | 0 | 1 | 3 | 1 | |

Pool B

| Athlete | Pld | W | D | L | Pts | Qualification |
|---|---|---|---|---|---|---|
| Feryal Abdelaziz (EGY) | 4 | 2 | 1 | 1 | 5 | Semifinals |
| Gong Li (CHN) | 4 | 2 | 1 | 1 | 5 | Semifinals |
| Elena Quirici (SUI) | 4 | 2 | 1 | 1 | 5 | |
| Hamideh Abbasali (IRI) | 4 | 2 | 0 | 2 | 4 | |
| Lamya Matoub (ALG) | 4 | 0 | 1 | 3 | 1 | |

Note:
1. Points won: EGY–14; CHN–13; SUI–10.

=== Finals ===
Semifinals
A1 Irina Zaretska (AZE) | 7
B2 Gong Li (CHN) (bronze) | 2
B1 Feryal Abdelaziz (EGY) | 5
A2 Sofya Berultseva (KAZ) (bronze) | 4

Gold medal
Irina Zaretska (AZE) (silver) | 0
Feryal Abdelaziz (EGY) (gold) | 2
