= Daniel Gaysinsky =

Canadian karateka (born 1994)

Personal information
- Born: September 3, 1994 (age 31)

Sport
- Country: Canada
- Sport: Karate
- Weight class: +84 kg
- Event: Kumite
Medal record
Men's karate
Representing Canada
Pan American Games
Silver medal – second place	2019 Lima	Kumite +84 kg
Pan American Karate Championships
Gold medal – first place	2017 Curaçao	Kumite +84 kg
Bronze medal – third place	2018 Santiago	Kumite +84 kg

Daniel Gaysinsky (born September 3, 1994) is a Canadian karateka. He won the silver medal in the men's kumite +84 kg event at the 2019 Pan American Games held in Lima, Peru.

He represented Canada at the 2020 Summer Olympics in Tokyo, Japan. He competed in the men's +75 kg event.

== Career ==
Gaysinsky won the gold medal in the men's kumite +84 kg event at the 2017 Pan American Karate Championships held in Curaçao. A year later, he won one of the bronze medals in his event at the 2018 Pan American Karate Championships held in Santiago, Chile.

In 2019, Gaysinsky won the silver medal in the men's kumite +84 kg event at the Pan American Games held in Lima, Peru. In the final, he lost against Brian Irr of the United States.

In 2021, he qualified at the World Olympic Qualification Tournament held in Paris, France to compete at the 2020 Summer Olympics in Tokyo, Japan.

== Achievements ==
Year	Competition	Venue	Rank	Event
2017	Pan American Karate Championships	Curaçao	1st	Kumite +84 kg
2018	Pan American Karate Championships	Santiago, Chile	3rd	Kumite +84 kg
2019	Pan American Games	Lima, Peru	2nd	Kumite +84 kg
