= 2021 World Karate Championships – Women's 68 kg =

World Karate Championship

Women's kumite 68 kg at the 2021 World Karate Championships
- Venue: Hamdan Sports Complex
- Location: Dubai, United Arab Emirates
- Dates: 16–20 November
- Competitors: 51 from 51 nations

Medalists
gold medal	Irina Zaretska	Azerbaijan
silver medal	Silvia Semeraro	Italy
bronze medal	Alizée Agier	France
bronze medal	Halyna Melnyk	Ukraine

The Women's 68 kg competition at the 2021 World Karate Championships was held from 16 to 20 November 2021.

== Results ==
=== Finals ===
Semifinals
(Italy) Silvia Semeraro	1
(Canada) Melissa Bratic	0
(Austria) Alisa Buchinger	3
(Azerbaijan) Irina Zaretska	10

Final
(Italy) Silvia Semeraro	3
(Azerbaijan) Irina Zaretska	3

=== Repechage ===
Repechage 1
(Poland) Magdalena Godlewska	2
(Slovakia) Miroslava Kopúňová	3

Repechage 2
(Slovakia) Miroslava Kopúňová	2
(Morocco) Nissrine Brouk	2

Repechage 3
(Morocco) Nissrine Brouk	0
(France) Alizée Agier	0

Bronze medal
(France) Alizée Agier	2
(Canada) Melissa Bratic	1

Repechage 2
(Belgium) Nesrine Bougrine	1
(Ukraine) Halyna Melnyk	8

Repechage 3
(Ukraine) Halyna Melnyk	3
(Brazil) Anna Prezzoti	3

Bronze medal
(Ukraine) Halyna Melnyk	3
(Austria) Alisa Buchinger	0

=== Top half ===
==== Section 1 ====
First round
(Finland) Elina Lehtonen	0
(Kazakhstan) Assel Kanay	0
(Serbia) Marina Radičević	4
(Kenya) Joyce Akinyi	4
(Japan) Kayo Someya	2
(Germany) Madeleine Schröter	0
(Mexico) Paola Rubio	1
(Morocco) Nissrine Brouk	3
(Italy) Silvia Semeraro	0
(Poland) Magdalena Godlewska	0

Second round
(Kazakhstan) Assel Kanay	1
(Kenya) Joyce Akinyi	0
(Japan) Kayo Someya	1
(France) Alizée Agier	3
(Morocco) Nissrine Brouk	6
(Democratic Republic of the Congo) Massamba Makiese	1
(Italy) Silvia Semeraro	1
(Slovakia) Miroslava Kopúňová	0

Third round
(Kazakhstan) Assel Kanay	0
(France) Alizée Agier	1
(Morocco) Nissrine Brouk	1
(Italy) Silvia Semeraro	3

Quarterfinals
(France) Alizée Agier	0
(Italy) Silvia Semeraro	1

==== Section 2 ====
First round
(Canada) Melissa Bratic	8
(Croatia) Mia Greta Zorko	0
(Turkmenistan) Selbi Rozybaýewa	0
(Bosnia and Herzegovina) Ivona Ćavar	2
(England) Reisha Hull	3
(India) Reetika	0
(Turkey) Eda Eltemur	0
(Egypt) Feryal Abdelaziz	8
(Jordan) Huda Jaber	0
(Greece) Vasiliki Panetsidou	3

Second round
(Canada) Melissa Bratic	2
(Bosnia and Herzegovina) Ivona Ćavar	1
(England) Reisha Hull	4
(Belarus) Maryia Aliakseyeva	1
(Egypt) Feryal Abdelaziz	5
(Slovenia) Kiti Smiljan	0
(Greece) Vasiliki Panetsidou	3
Victoria Isaeva	2

Third round
(Canada) Melissa Bratic	1
(England) Reisha Hull	1
(Egypt) Feryal Abdelaziz	1
(Greece) Vasiliki Panetsidou	0

Quarterfinals
(Canada) Melissa Bratic	1
(Egypt) Feryal Abdelaziz	0

=== Bottom half ===
==== Section 3 ====
First round
(Hong Kong) Wong Cheuk Lee	3
(Sweden) Alexandra Haag	0
(Switzerland) Elena Quirici	1
(United States) Skylar Lingl	0
Ceyco Georgia Zefanya	4
(Austria) Alisa Buchinger	5
(Venezuela) Marianth Cuervo	0
(United Arab Emirates) Fatma Khasaif	0
(Norway) Andrine Hilton	2
(Kosovo) Diellza Sejdijaj	1

Second round
(Hong Kong) Wong Cheuk Lee	0
(Switzerland) Elena Quirici	0
(Austria) Alisa Buchinger	7
(Uzbekistan) Dildora Alikulova	3
(Venezuela) Marianth Cuervo	4
(South Africa) Danielle van Wyk	0
(Norway) Andrine Hilton	1
(Chinese Taipei) Chao Jou	1

Third round
(Switzerland) Elena Quirici	0
(Austria) Alisa Buchinger	3
(Venezuela) Marianth Cuervo	5
(Chinese Taipei) Chao Jou	0

Quarterfinals
(Austria) Alisa Buchinger	5
(Venezuela) Marianth Cuervo	3

==== Section 4 ====
First round
(North Macedonia) Angela Mojsovska	4
(Montenegro) Marina Raković	5
(Armenia) Anita Makyan	2
(Australia) Mandy Yap	0
(Ukraine) Halyna Melnyk	3
(Spain) Adriana Gil	2
(Colombia) Wendy Mosquera	1
(Belgium) Nesrine Bougrine	2

Second round
(Montenegro) Marina Raković	0
(Romania) Claudia Ionita	3
(Armenia) Anita Makyan	4
(Brazil) Anna Prezzoti	8
(Ukraine) Halyna Melnyk	5
(Portugal) Flávia Ribeiro	1
(Belgium) Nesrine Bougrine	1
(Azerbaijan) Irina Zaretska	5

Third round
(Romania) Claudia Ionita	1
(Brazil) Anna Prezzoti	3
(Ukraine) Halyna Melnyk	0
(Azerbaijan) Irina Zaretska	2

Quarterfinals
(Brazil) Anna Prezzoti	2
(Azerbaijan) Irina Zaretska	6
