= Btissam Sadini =

Moroccan karateka (born 1998)

Personal information
- National team: Morocco
- Born: 9 February 1998 (age 28) Tetouan, Morocco

Sport
- Country: Morocco
- Sport: Karate
- Events: Kumite; Team kumite
Medal record
Women's karate
Representing Morocco
World Championships
Bronze medal – third place	2018 Madrid	Kumite 61 kg
African Games
Gold medal – first place	2019 Rabat	Team
Bronze medal – third place	2019 Rabat	Kumite 61 kg

Btissam Sadini (or Ibtissam Sadini, born 9 February 1998) is a Moroccan karateka. She won a bronze medal in the women's kumite 61 kg event at the 2018 World Karate Championships held in Madrid, Spain.

== Career ==
In 2018, she won silver medal in the African Championship in Rwanda.

In 2019, she represented Morocco at the 2019 African Games and she won one of the bronze medals in the women's kumite 61 kg event. She also won the gold medal in the women's team kumite event.

In 2019, she won the bronze medal in the African Championship in Gaborone, Botswana.

In 2020, she won the silver medal in African Championship in Tangier, Morocco.

In 2021, she qualified at the World Olympic Qualification Tournament held in Paris, France to compete at the 2020 Summer Olympics in Tokyo, Japan. She competed in the women's 61 kg event. She was also the flag bearer for Morocco during the closing ceremony.

== Achievements ==
Year	Competition	Venue	Rank	Event
2018	World Championships	Madrid, Spain	3rd	Kumite 61 kg
2019	African Championships	Gaborone, Botswana	3rd	Kumite 61 kg
2019	African Games	Rabat, Morocco	3rd	Kumite 61 kg
2019	African Games	Rabat, Morocco	1st	Team
2020	African Championships	Rabat, Morocco	2nd	Kumite 61 kg
