= Herolind Nishevci =

Karateka from Kosovo

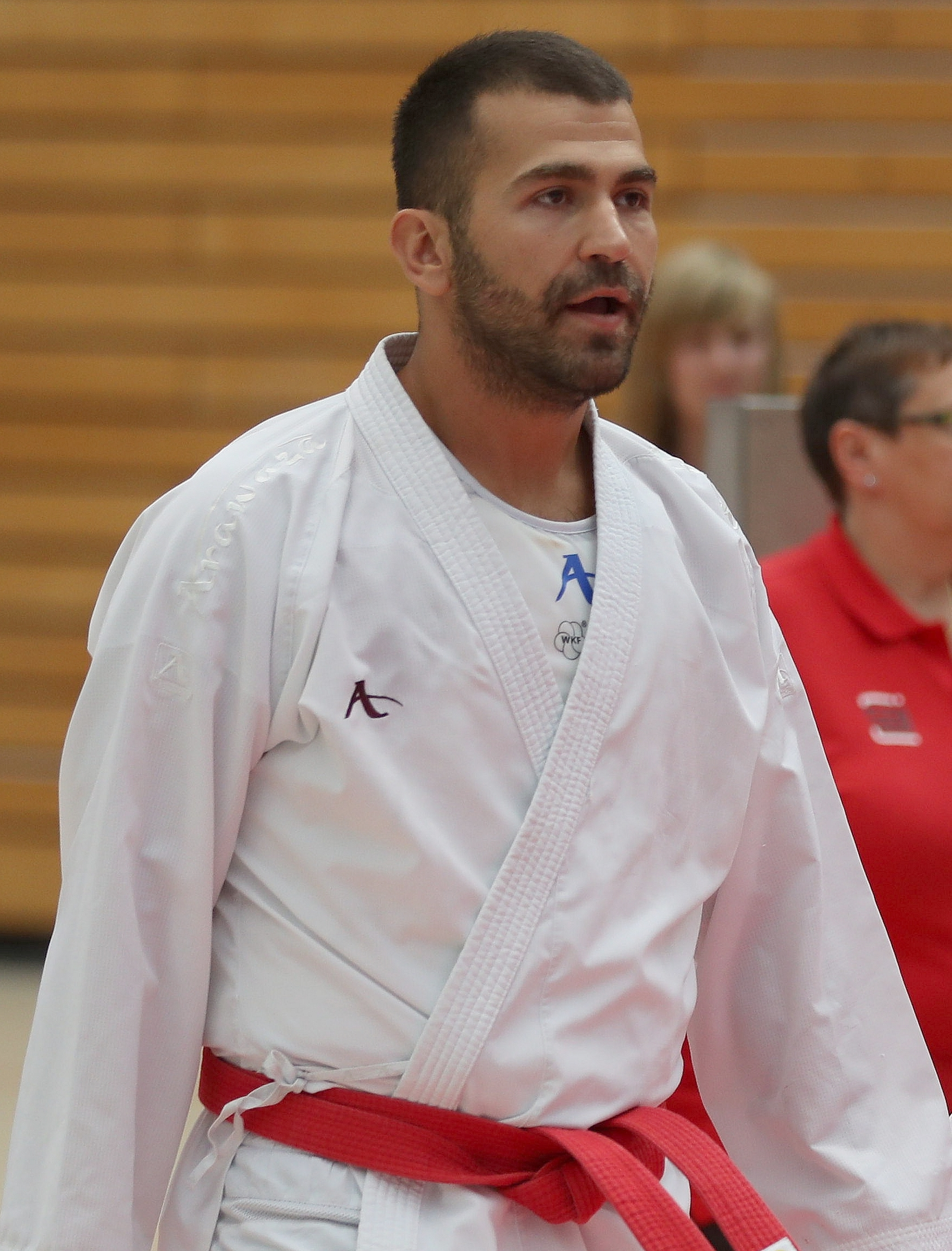

Personal information
- Full name: Herolind Nishevci
- Nationality: Kosovan
- Born: 2 March 1992 (age 34) Pristina, SFR Yugoslavia

Sport
- Country: Kosovo
- Sport: Karate
- Rank: 22 (+84 kg)
- Event: +84 kg
Medal record
Men's Karate
Representing Kosovo
World Championships
Bronze medal – third place	2016 Linz	+84 kg
European Championships
Bronze medal – third place	2021 Poreč	+84 kg

Herolind Nishevci is an Albanian karateka from Kosovo. Nishevci competed at the 2016 World Karate Championships at the 84 kg division and won the bronze medal.
