= Panah Abdullayev =

Azerbaijani karateka

Sport
- Country: Azerbaijan
- Sport: Karate
- Weight class: 84 kg
- Event: Kumite
Medal record
Men's karate
Representing Azerbaijan
Event	1st	2nd	3rd
European Championships	0	2	2
Islamic Solidarity Games	0	1	0
Total	0	3	2
European Championships
Silver medal – second place	2021 Poreč	Kumite 84 kg
Silver medal – second place	2022 Gaziantep	Team kumite
Bronze medal – third place	2015 Istanbul	Team kumite
Bronze medal – third place	2021 Poreč	Team kumite
Islamic Solidarity Games
Silver medal – second place	2021 Konya	Kumite 84 kg

Panah Abdullayev is an Azerbaijani karateka. He won the silver medal in the men's kumite 84 kg event at the 2021 European Karate Championships held in Poreč, Croatia.

He won the silver medal in the men's 84 kg event at the 2021 Islamic Solidarity Games held in Konya, Turkey.

== Achievements ==
Year	Competition	Venue	Rank	Event
2015	European Championships	Istanbul, Turkey	3rd	Team kumite
2021	European Championships	Poreč, Croatia	2nd	Kumite 84 kg
2021	European Championships	Poreč, Croatia	3rd	Team kumite
2022	European Championships	Gaziantep, Turkey	2nd	Team kumite
2022	Islamic Solidarity Games	Konya, Turkey	2nd	Kumite 84 kg
