= Silvia Semeraro =

Italian karateka (born 1996)

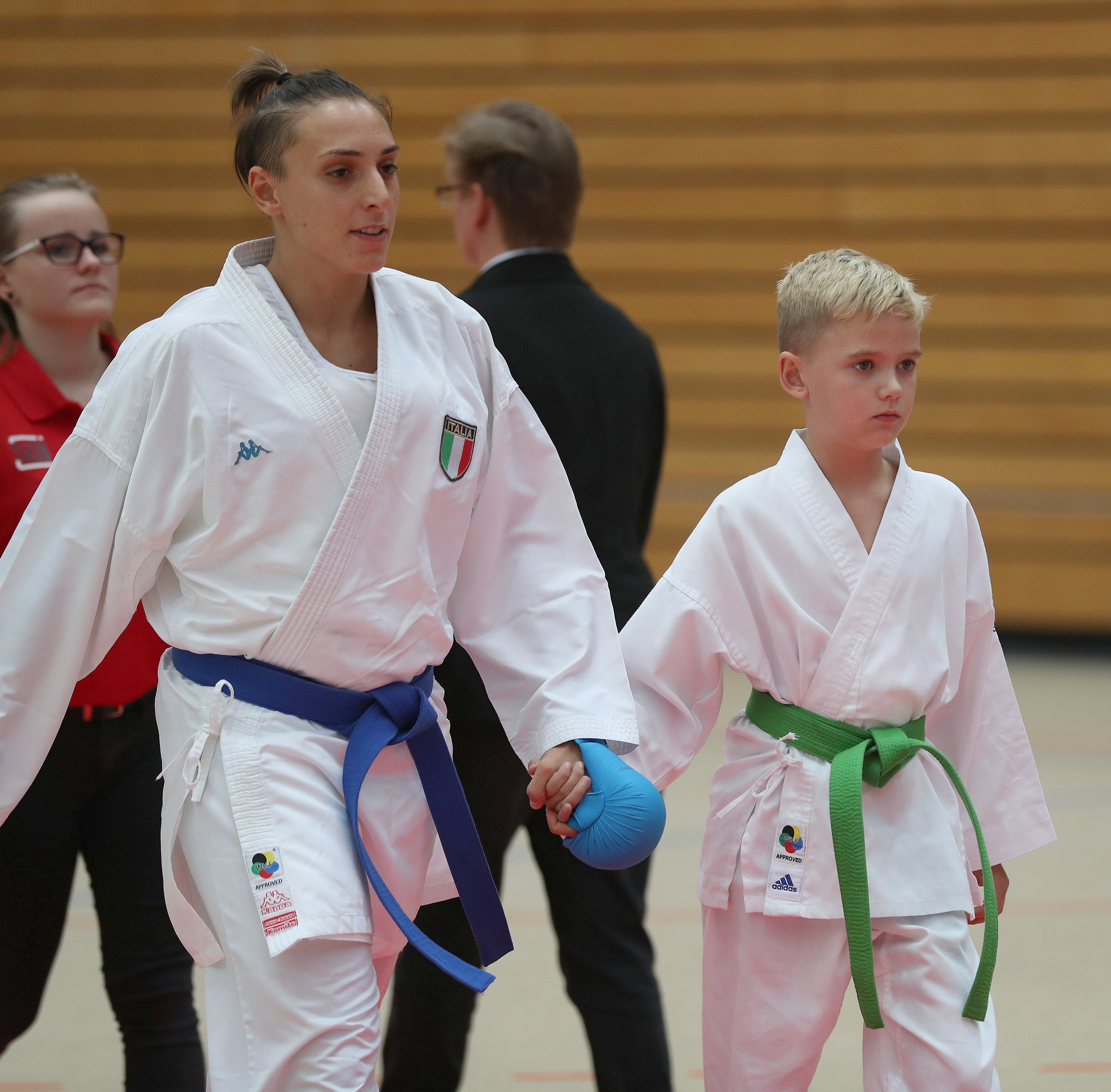

Personal information
- Born: 2 May 1996 (age 30) Faggiano, Italy

Sport
- Country: Italy
- Sport: Karate
- Weight class: 68 kg
- Events: Kumite; Team kumite
Medal record
Women's karate
Representing Italy
World Championships
Silver medal – second place	2021 Dubai	Kumite 68 kg
Bronze medal – third place	2021 Dubai	Team kumite
World Games
Gold medal – first place	2022 Birmingham	Kumite 68 kg
European Games
Gold medal – first place	2019 Minsk	Kumite 68 kg
European Championships
Silver medal – second place	2018 Novi Sad	Team kumite
Bronze medal – third place	2018 Novi Sad	Kumite 68 kg
Bronze medal – third place	2019 Guadalajara	Kumite 68 kg
Bronze medal – third place	2019 Guadalajara	Team kumite
Bronze medal – third place	2021 Poreč	Team kumite
Bronze medal – third place	2023 Guadalajara	Kumite 68 kg
Bronze medal – third place	2023 Guadalajara	Team kumite
Bronze medal – third place	2025 Yerevan	Team kumite
Mediterranean Games
Gold medal – first place	2018 Tarragona	Kumite 68 kg
Silver medal – second place	2022 Oran	Kumite 68 kg
Silver medal – second place	2026 Taranto	Kumite 68 kg

Silvia Semeraro (born 2 May 1996) is an Italian karateka. She won the gold medal in the women's kumite 68 kg event at the 2022 World Games held in Birmingham, United States. Semeraro also won the gold medal in the same event at the 2019 European Games held in Minsk, Belarus. She won the silver medal in the women's 68 kg event at the 2021 World Karate Championships held in Dubai, United Arab Emirates.

Semeraro represented Italy at the 2020 Summer Olympics in Tokyo, Japan. She competed in the women's +61 kg event.

== Career ==
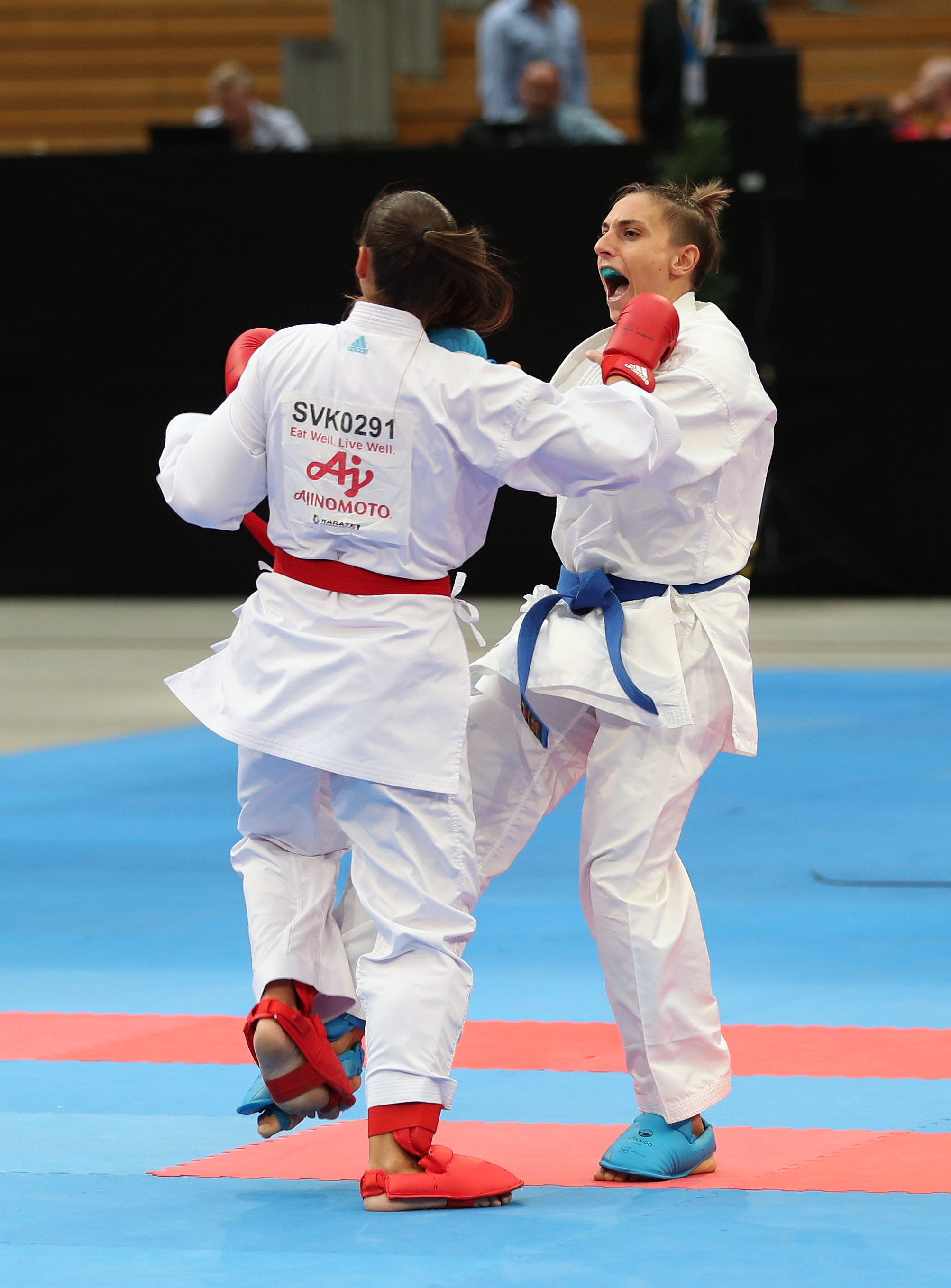
Silvia Semeraro at the Karate 1 Premier League 2018 in Berlin

At the 2018 European Karate Championships held in Novi Sad, Serbia, she won the silver medal in the team kumite event and one of the bronze medals in the women's kumite 68 kg event. A month later, Semeraro won the gold medal in the women's kumite 68 kg event at the 2018 Mediterranean Games held in Tarragona, Spain.

In 2021, Semeraro qualified at the World Olympic Qualification Tournament held in Paris, France to compete at the 2020 Summer Olympics in Tokyo, Japan. At the Olympics, she finished in third place in her pool during the pool stage in the women's +61 kg event and she did not advance to compete in the semifinals. In October 2021, she won the gold medal in her event at the 2021 Mediterranean Karate Championships held in Limassol, Cyprus. In November 2021, Semeraro won the silver medal in the women's 68 kg event at the World Karate Championships held in Dubai, United Arab Emirates. She also won one of the bronze medals in the women's team kumite event.

Semeraro competed in the women's 68 kg event at the 2022 European Karate Championships held in Gaziantep, Turkey. She won the silver medal in the women's 68 kg event at the 2022 Mediterranean Games held in Oran, Algeria. In the final, she lost against Feryal Abdelaziz of Egypt. Semeraro won the gold medal in the women's 68 kg event at the 2022 World Games held in Birmingham, United States.

Semeraro won one of the bronze medals in the women's 68 kg event at the 2023 European Karate Championships held in Guadalajara, Spain. She also won one of the bronze medals in the women's team kumite event.

She won the silver medal in the women's 68 kg event at the 2026 Mediterranean Games held in Taranto, Italy.

== Achievements ==
Year	Competition	Venue	Rank	Event
2018	European Championships	Novi Sad, Serbia	2nd	Team kumite
2018	European Championships	Novi Sad, Serbia	3rd	Kumite 68 kg
2018	Mediterranean Games	Tarragona, Spain	1st	Kumite 68 kg
2019	European Championships	Guadalajara, Spain	3rd	Team kumite
2019	European Championships	Guadalajara, Spain	3rd	Kumite 68 kg
2019	European Games	Minsk, Belarus	1st	Kumite 68 kg
2021	European Championships	Poreč, Croatia	3rd	Team kumite
2021	World Championships	Dubai, United Arab Emirates	2nd	Kumite 68 kg
2021	World Championships	Dubai, United Arab Emirates	3rd	Team kumite
2022	Mediterranean Games	Oran, Algeria	2nd	Kumite 68 kg
2022	World Games	Birmingham, United States	1st	Kumite 68 kg
2023	European Championships	Guadalajara, Spain	3rd	Kumite 68 kg
2023	European Championships	Guadalajara, Spain	3rd	Team kumite
2025	European Championships	Yerevan, Armenia	3rd	Team kumite
2026	Mediterranean Games	Taranto, Italy	2nd	Kumite 68 kg
