= Mohamed Ahmed Ramadan =

Egyptian karateka (born 1995)

Mohamed Ramadan
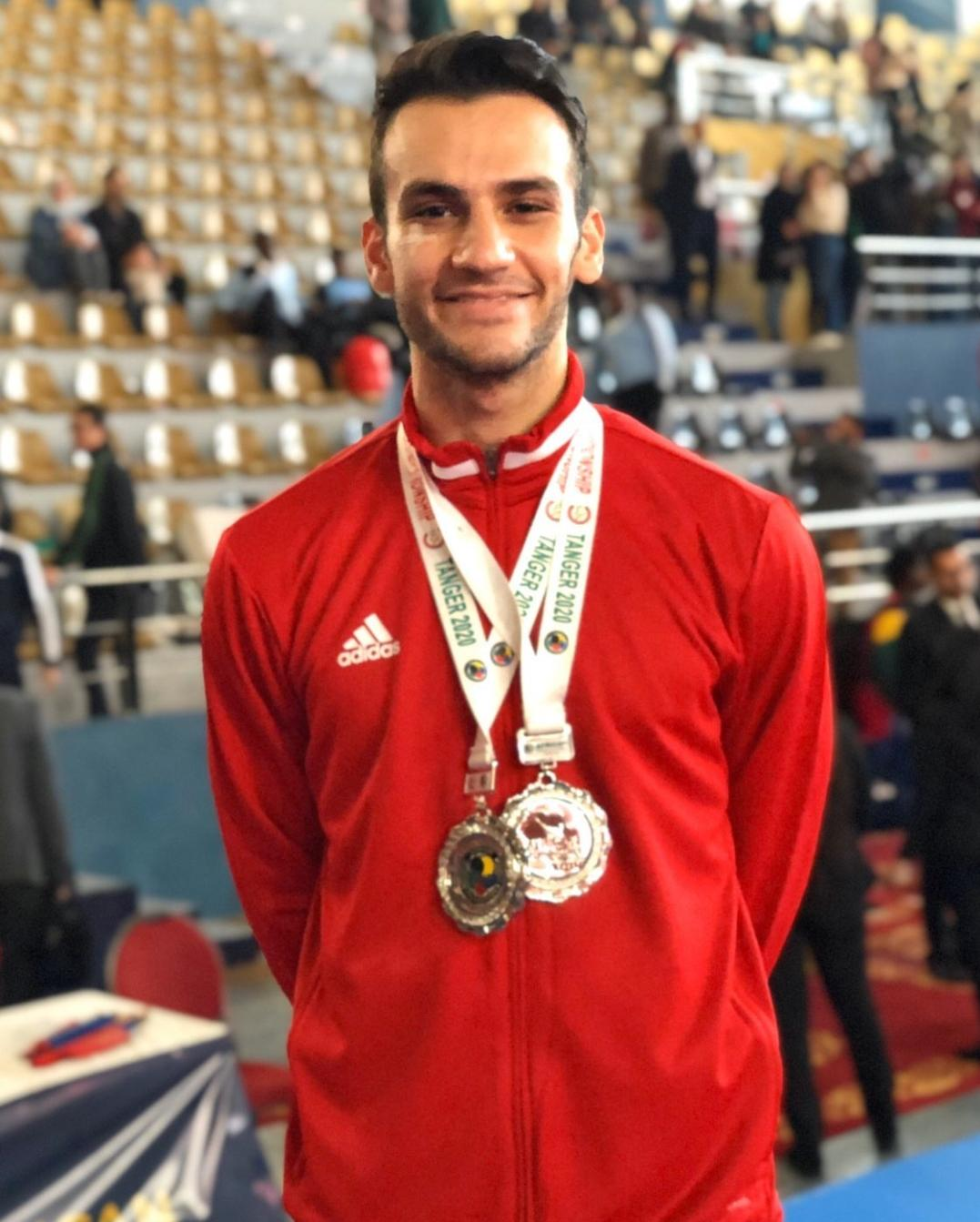

Personal information
- Full name: Mohamed Ahmed
- Nationality: Egyptian
- Born: 1995 (age 30–31) Cairo, Egypt
- Height: 183 cm (6 ft 0 in)
- Weight: 81 kg (179 lb)

Achievements and titles
- Highest world ranking: 2nd (February 2023)
Medal record
Representing (Egypt)
Men's karate
World Championships U21
Silver medal – second place	2015 Jakarta	84 kg
African Championship
Gold medal – first place	2019 Gaborone	Kumite Team
Silver medal – second place	2020 Tangier	84 kg, individual
Silver medal – second place	2020 Tangier	Kumite Team
Gold medal – first place	2022 Durban	Kumite Team
African Games
Bronze medal – third place	2019 Rabat	Kumite Team
Karate1 Premier League
Silver medal – second place	2014 Paris	75 kg
Bronze medal – third place	2019 Paris	84 kg
Gold medal – first place	2020 Paris	84 kg
Bronze medal – third place	2021 istanbul	84 kg
Bronze medal – third place	2021 Cairo	84 kg
Silver medal – second place	2022 Fujairah	84 kg
Bronze medal – third place	2022 Matosinhos	84 kg
Bronze medal – third place	2023 Rabat	84 kg
Karate1 Series A
Bronze medal – third place	2018 Santiago	84 kg
Bronze medal – third place	2018 Shanghai	84 kg
International Awards
Gold medal – first place	Grand Winner 2022	84 kg

Mohamed Ahmed Ramadan (Arabic: مُحَمَّد أَحْمَد رَمَضَان; was born in Cairo, Egypt), better known as Mohamed Ramadan, is an international karate athlete from Egypt who was playing for Egypt national Karate team (from 2013 till 2022), Al-Ahly Sporting Club (from 2000 till 2022) and for Al-Zohour Sporting Club(from 2022 till 2024) and Spn Vernon French Club as a loan in some competitions (from 2017 to 2024). He won several medals in international championships including World, Continental and Karate1, also he was a world record holder of "the most jumping martial arts high kicks on one leg in one minute" by breaking the record of the Guinness World Records. Before it has been broken by another person.

== Career ==
He started his career in karate at four years old, in the Al-Ahly Sporting Club in Egypt. He did kata and kumite together till 2005 and then he decided to specialize in kumite (contact fighting version of karate) in 2006. He obtained his first bronze national medal in 2007 then he became national champion in 2009 and he was only 14 years old. then he joined the national team of Egypt in 2013, and he obtained his first medal in senior's category (-75 kg) in a major international championship at Karate1 Premier League in 2014 and he was only 18 years old in "Pierre-de-Coubertin" stadium in Paris then he got a serious injury in his shoulder and that prevented him from finishing the season. and then he came back in 2015 and He won his first world title in the World Championship U21 in addition to gold medal in the Mediterranean championship and silver medal in Open Dubai. in 2016 he got another injury again but this time in his wrist that needed an operation and that prevented him from finishing the season and affected his level badly in 2017 which made him without any world ranking cause he lost all of his world ranking points because he didn't compete in any championship, then he came back again in 2018 with a new category (-84 kg). in early 2018 he had joined SPN Vernon (French Club) and he returned step by step into the world ranking by winning some series A and premier leagues events in Chile, Shanghai.

in January 2019, he won a bronze medal in category -84 kg at Karate1 Premier League Paris 2019 then by the end of the year he achieved a gold medal in African championship by teams that held in Gaborone, and a bronze medal in All African Games in Tangier, Morocco. Afterwards, he received the order of republic of Egypt the 3rd degree from the president Abd el fattah el sisi.

in January 2020, He won his first gold medal in Karate1 Premier League Paris 2020 then he achieved silver medal in the African championship Tangier 2020 in category -84 kg and in teams.

By June 2020, he became 10th in the world ranking (-84 kg) and 19th in the Olympic ranking and 1st between All Africans in Olympic category (+75 kg) and world category (-84 kg).

In June 2021, he competed at the World Olympic Qualification Tournament held in Paris, France hoping to qualify for the 2020 Summer Olympics in Tokyo, Japan. He was eliminated in his Fourth match by Athlete from Kosovo.

He continues his success by Climbing the world Ranking by achieving two bronze medals in Karate1 Premier League Istanbul and Cairo 2021, Silver Medal in Karate1 Premier League Fujairah 2022 and bronze medal in Karate1 Premier League Matosinhos 2022 Until he becomes 3rd in the current world ranking -84 kg from July 2022 till January 2023.

In December 2022, he achieved the gold medal in African Championship that had been held in Durban, South Africa, He got gold with Egypt Team in Senior Male team Fights after beating Algeria team in the final 3–0.

in January 2023, he was able to achieve the Grand Winner award from World Karate Federation to declare that he is the best in category -84 kg of season 2022 in Karate1 events, and it's mandatory to achieve this award to get the highest points in Karate1 Premier League Standing and to Participate at least in 4 events out 5 events during the season according to WKF rules 2022, after this season he reached the 2nd place in the world ranking in the February 2023.

in May 2023, he achieved his 10th medal in Karate1 events after achieving the bronze medal Karate1 Premier League Rabat 2023 in category -84 kg.

== International Awards ==
He achieved the Grand Winner for season 2022 in Category -84 kg from World Karate Federation to declare that he is the best of the best in Karate1 Premier League events.

on 26 June 2024, He broke the world record of "the most jumping martial arts high kicks on one leg in one minute" in the Guinness World Records by achieving 100 kicks in one minute.

== International competitions ==
Year	Competition	Venue	Position	Notes
Representing the (Egypt)
2014	Karate1 Premier League	Paris	2nd	75 kg
2015	XXIV Mediterranean Karate Championships U21	Alexandria	1st	75 kg
2015	World championship U21	Jakarta	2nd	84 kg
2018	Karate1 Series A	Santiago	3rd	84 kg
2018	Karate1 Series A	Shanghai	3rd	84 kg
2019	UFAK Senior African Championship	Gaborone	1st	Kumite Team
2019	All African Games	Rabat	3rd	Kumite Team
2019	Karate1 Premier League	Paris	3rd	84 kg
2020	UFAK Senior African Championship	Tangier	2nd	84 kg
2020	UFAK Senior African Championship	Tangier	2nd	Kumite Team
2020	Premier League	Paris	1st	84 kg
2021	Karate1 Premier League	Istanbul	3rd	84 kg
2021	Karate1 Premier League	Cairo	3rd	84 kg
2022	Karate1 Premier League	Fujairah	2nd	84 kg
2022	Karate1 Premier League	Matosinhos	3rd	84 kg
2022	UFAK Senior African Championship	Durban	1st	Kumite Team
2023	Karate1 Premier League	Rabat	3rd	84 kg
