= Feryal Abdelaziz =

Egyptian karateka (born 1999)

Personal information
- Full name: Feryal Ashraf Abdelaziz
- Born: 16 February 1999 (age 27) Cairo, Egypt

Sport
- Country: Egypt
- Sport: Karate
- Weight class: 68 kg
- Event: Kumite
Medal record
Women's karate
Representing Egypt
Olympic Games
Gold medal – first place	2020 Tokyo	Kumite +61 kg
World Championships
Gold medal – first place	2021 Dubai	Team kumite
Bronze medal – third place	2018 Madrid	Team kumite
African Games
Silver medal – second place	2019 Rabat	Kumite 68 kg
Mediterranean Games
Gold medal – first place	2022 Oran	Kumite 68 kg
Gold medal – first place	2026 Taranto	Kumite 68 kg

Feryal Ashraf Abdelaziz (Egyptian Arabic: فريال اشرف عبد العزيز; born 16 February 1999) is an Egyptian karateka and the first female Egyptian to have won a gold medal at the Olympic Games. She won the gold medal in the women's +61 kg event at the 2020 Summer Olympics held in Tokyo, Japan.

== Life ==
She was born in 1999 and when she was seven she took up karate in Cairo. In her education she studied at The British University in Egypt and trained to become a pharmacist.

She won one of the bronze medals in her event at the 2019 African Karate Championships held in Gaborone, Botswana. She represented Egypt at the African Games held in Rabat, Morocco and she won the silver medal in the women's kumite 68 kg event.

In June 2021, she qualified at the World Olympic Qualification Tournament held in Paris, France to compete at the 2020 Summer Olympics in Tokyo, Japan.

Her first match was against the Chinese Gong Li which she won 4:0. Gong Li was to progress further and take a bronze medal. Abdelaziz's second match was with Elena Quirici and she took an early lead against the Swiss opponent but Quirici levelled the score and Abdelaziz only prevailed because of senshu as she had been awarded the contest's first unopposed score. Abdelaziz then lost a match to an Iranian before a scoreless draw with Algerian Lamya Matoub allowed her to proceed to the semi-finals.

She beat Sofya Berultseva of Kazakhstan, 5:4, to claim a place in the gold medal event against Azerbaijan's Irina Zaretska. Berultseva would be guaranteed a bronze medal as peculiarly karate does not have a third place play-off match and the losing semi finalists both get a bronze medal. Abdelaziz beat her opponent in the final 2:0 to gain the gold medal and Zaretska took the silver on 7 August.

Abdelaziz and Giana Farouk were the only competitors to win a medal for Egypt in karate at the 2020 Summer Olympics. Karate will not feature in the 2024 Summer Olympics in Paris. Farouk won one of the bronze medals in the women's 61 kg event the day before. Abdelaziz was the first female Egyptian to have won a gold medal at any Olympic Games.

In November 2021, she won the gold medal in the women's team kumite event at the 2021 World Karate Championships held in Dubai, United Arab Emirates. She also competed in the women's 68 kg event.

She won the gold medal in the women's 68 kg event at the 2022 Mediterranean Games held in Oran, Algeria. In the final, she defeated Silvia Semeraro of Italy.

== Achievements ==
Year	Competition	Venue	Rank	Event
2018	World Championships	Madrid, Spain	3rd	Team kumite
2019	African Games	Rabat, Morocco	2nd	Kumite 68 kg
2021	Olympic Games	Tokyo, Japan	1st	Kumite +61 kg
2021	World Championships	Dubai, United Arab Emirates	1st	Team kumite
2022	Mediterranean Games	Oran, Algeria	1st	Kumite 68 kg
