= Rozita Alipour =

Iranian karateka (born 1989)

Rozita Alipour رزیتا علی‌پور
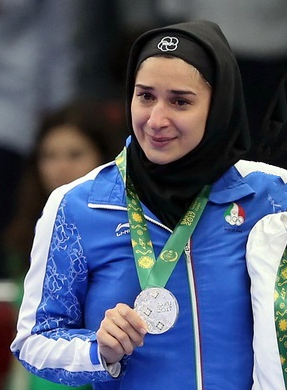
- Alipour at the 2017 Islamic Solidarity Games
- Born: 6 July 1989 (age 37); Ghaemshahr, Mazandaran, Iran
- Height: 165 cm (5 ft 5 in)
- Style: Karate, kumite
- Trainer: Setareh Mousavi

Rozita Alipour (Persian: رزیتا علی‌پور, also Romanized as "Rozītā Alīpūr"; born 6 July 1989) is an Iranian karateka, who competes in the kumite 61 kg division. She won silver medals at the 2017 Islamic Solidarity Games and 2018 Asian Games.

In 2021, she competed at the World Olympic Qualification Tournament held in Paris, France hoping to qualify for the 2020 Summer Olympics in Tokyo, Japan. She won one of the bronze medals in her event at the 2021 Asian Karate Championships held in Almaty, Kazakhstan.
