= Farouk Abdesselem =

French Karateka

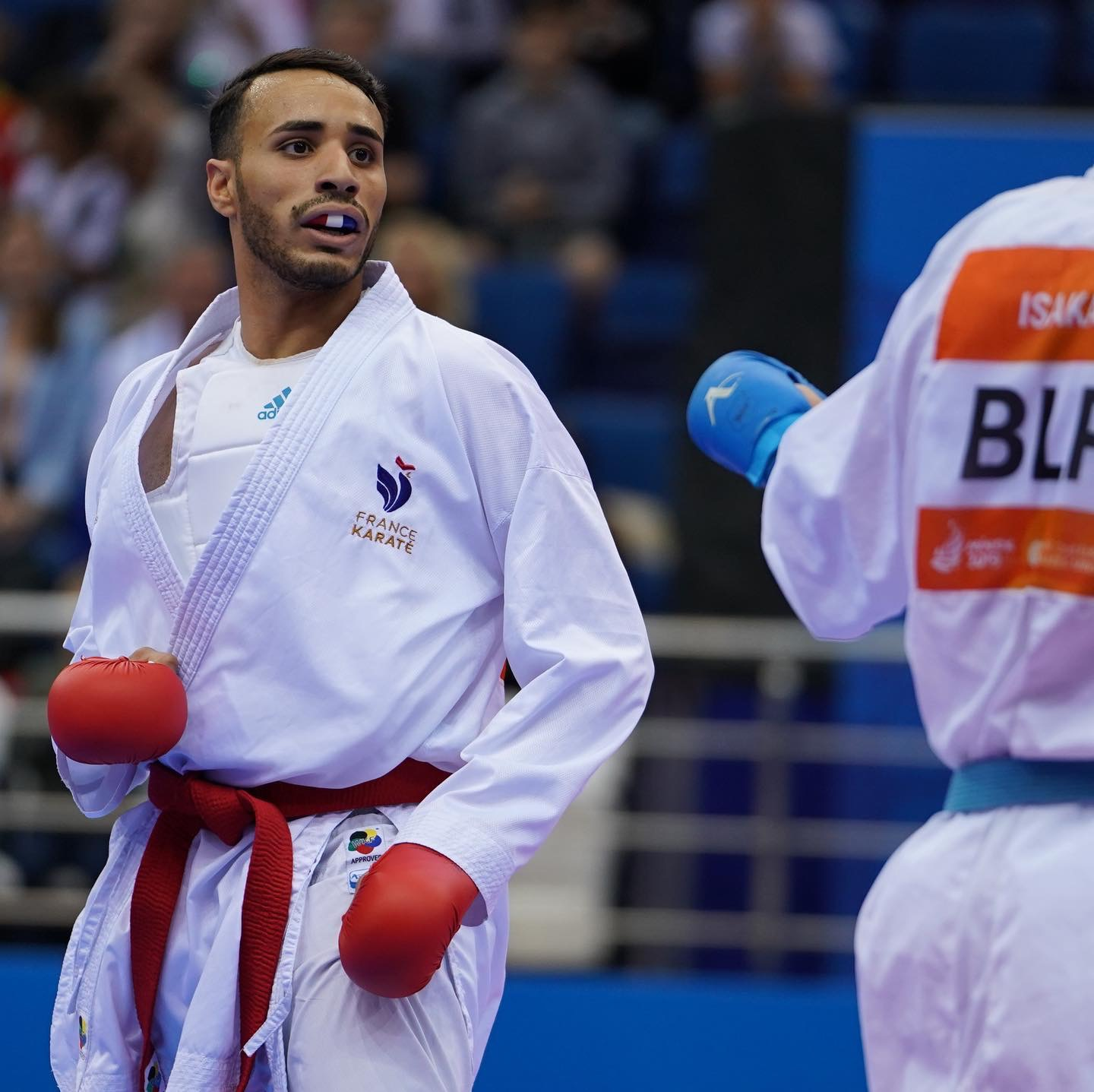

Personal information
- Nationality: French
- Born: 9 September 1991 (age 34) Arles, France
- Occupation: Karateka
- Years active: 2009

Sport
- Country: France
- Sport: Karate
Medal record
Men's karate
Representing France
European Championships
Gold medal – first place	2021 Mediterranean championship Limassol, Cyprus	Kumite +84 kg
Bronze medal – third place	2019 Karate 1 League Dubai, UAE	Kumite -84 kg
Bronze medal – third place	2019 Karate 1 League Okinawa, Japan	Kumite -84 kg
Bronze medal – third place	2019 Karate 1 League Montreal, Canada	Kumite -84 kg
Silver medal – second place	2019 Serie A Shanghai, China	Kumite -84 kg
Silver medal – second place	2018 Serie A Serie A Santiago, Chile	Kumite -84 kg
Bronze medal – third place	2014 Karate 1 Rotterdam	Kumite -84 kg
Bronze medal – third place	2013 Serie A Lazlo, Slovenia	Kumite -84 kg
Bronze medal – third place	2009 European Championship Paris, France	Kumite +76 kg

Farouk Abdesselem (born 9, September 1991) is a French Karateka and a national coach of the South Korean karate team, and a former coach of Indonesian Karate team. Holder of -84 kilogram, Farouk has represented France in several championships of the World European championship, and European games. He won the bronze medal in the Premier League in Lisbon and qualified for the Olympic tournament (TQO) in Paris to represent the French team for Olympic Games in Tokyo 2020. In 2022, Farouk became the national coach of the Indonesian Karate team for the 2021 SEA Games which won five gold, six bronze, and three silver medals. Farouk is the 5th in the world in 84 kg Karateka, with multi-medalists at international tournaments.

== Achievements ==
Year	Competition	Venue	Rank	Event
2021	Mediterranean Championship	Limassol, Cyprus	1st	Kumite 84 kg
2019	Karate 1 League	Dubai, UAE	3rd	Kumite 84 kg
2019	Karate 1 League	Okinawa, Japan	3rd	Kumite 84 kg
2019	Karate 1 League	Montreal, Canada	3rd	Kumite 84 kg
2019	Serie A	Shanghai, China	2nd	Kumite 84 kg
2018	Serie A	Santiago, Chile	2nd	Kumite 84 kg
2014	Karate 1	Rotterdam	3rd	Kumite 84 kg
2013	Serie A	Lazlo, Slovenia	3rd	Kumite 84 kg
2009	European Championship	Paris, France	3rd	Kumite +76 kg
