= Victoria Isaeva =

Russian karateka

Sport
- Country: Russia
- Sport: Karate
- Weight class: 68 kg
- Event: Kumite
Medal record
Women's karate
Representing Russia
World Championships
Silver medal – second place	2018 Madrid	Kumite 68 kg

Victoria Isaeva is a Russian karateka. She won the silver medal in the women's kumite 68 kg event at the 2018 World Karate Championships held in Madrid, Spain. In the final, she lost against Irina Zaretska of Azerbaijan.

In June 2021, she competed at the World Olympic Qualification Tournament held in Paris, France hoping to qualify for the 2020 Summer Olympics in Tokyo, Japan. In November 2021, she competed in the women's 68 kg event at the World Karate Championships held in Dubai, United Arab Emirates.

== Achievements ==
Year	Competition	Venue	Rank	Event
2018	World Championships	Madrid, Spain	2nd	Kumite 68 kg
