= Aleksandra Stubleva =

Bulgarian karateka

Aleksandra Stubleva is a former Bulgarian karateka competing in the kumite +68 kg division. She won the first silver medal for Bulgaria at a European Karate Championships event.

== Career ==
Stubleva was a Bulgarian karateka and member of the Bulgarian National Karate Federation (BNFC). Stubleva competed in the -68 kg event at the 2014 European Championships in Tampere, Finland. In 2016, she won a bronze medal at the European U21 Championships in Limassol, Cyprus.

In 2017, Stubleva reached the final of the women's 68+ kg event at the Karate 1-Premier League in Dubai, United Arab Emirates, winning silver after being defeated in the final match by Japan's Ayumi Uekusa.

At the 2018 Karate 1-Premier League event in Tokyo, Japan, Stubleva reached the semi-final of the women's 68+ kg event before being knocked out by French karateka Nancy Garcia.

In March 2019, Stubleva came 7th place in the women's 68+ kg event at the 2019 European Karate Championships in Guadalajara, Spain. At the 2020 Karate 1-Premier League in Paris, France, Stubleva reached the semi-final and was beaten for a place in the final by Iran's Hamideh Abbasali.

At the 2021 Karate World Olympic Qualification Tournament, Stubleva beat Viktorija Rezajeva and Wiktoria Grejner, then was knocked out by Ivona Ćavar out at the round of 16. She won a silver medal at the 2021 European Karate Championships in Poreč, Istria, Croatia, after beating Fortesa Orana in the semi-final, then being defeated by Turkish karateka Meltem Hocaoğlu in the final match. Her medal was the first silver medal won for Bulgaria at a European Karate Championships event.

Stubleva retired from her competitive karateka career in 2025.
