= Halyna Melnyk =

Ukrainian karateka (born 1994)

Personal information
- Born: 25 February 1994 (age 32)

Sport
- Country: Ukraine
- Sport: Karate
- Weight class: 68 kg
- Events: Kumite; Team kumite
Medal record
Women's karate
Representing Ukraine
World Championships
Bronze medal – third place	2021 Dubai	Kumite 68 kg
European Games
Bronze medal – third place	2019 Minsk	Kumite 68 kg
European Championships
Gold medal – first place	2019 Guadalajara	Team kumite

Halyna Melnyk (born 25 February 1994) is a Ukrainian karateka. She won one of the bronze medals in the women's kumite 68 kg event at the 2019 European Games held in Minsk, Belarus.

In the same year, Melnyk also won the gold medal in the women's team kumite event at the 2019 European Karate Championships held in Guadalajara, Spain.

In June 2021, Melnyk competed at the World Olympic Qualification Tournament held in Paris, France hoping to qualify for the 2020 Summer Olympics in Tokyo, Japan. In November 2021, she won one of the bronze medals in the women's 68 kg event at the World Karate Championships held in Dubai, United Arab Emirates. She defeated Alisa Buchinger of Austria in her bronze medal match.

Melnyk competed in the women's kumite 68 kg event at the 2022 European Karate Championships held in Gaziantep, Turkey. She also competed in the women's kumite 68 kg event at the 2022 World Games held in Birmingham, United States.

== Achievements ==
Year	Competition	Venue	Rank	Event
2019	European Championships	Guadalajara, Spain	1st	Team kumite
2019	European Games	Minsk, Belarus	3rd	Kumite 68 kg
2021	World Championships	Dubai, United Arab Emirates	3rd	Kumite 68 kg
