= Evgeny Plakhutin =

Russian karateka (born 1994)

- Born: 20 August 1994 (age 32)
- Division: 60 kg
- Style: Karate Kumite

Evgeny Yuryevich Plakhutin (Russian: Евгений Юрьевич Плахутин; born 20 August 1994) is a Russian karateka. He won a bronze medal at the 2019 European Games and was the European champion in 2019.

== Achievements ==
| Year | Competition | Venue | Rank | Event |
|---|---|---|---|---|
| 2014 | World Championships | Bremen, Germany | 3rd | Kumite 60 kg |
| 2015 | European Championships | Istanbul, Turkey | 3rd | Kumite 60 kg |
| 2018 | European Championships | Novi Sad, Serbia | 3rd | Kumite 60 kg |
| 2019 | European Championships | Guadalajara, Spain | 1st | Kumite 60 kg |
| 2019 | European Games | Minsk, Belarus | 3rd | Kumite 60 kg |
