= 2016 Karate1 Premier League =

The Karate 1 – Premier League 2016 is a series of international karate competitions organized by the World Karate Federation (WKF) during the year 2016. The series consists of multiple stages held across different countries within the Premier League circuit and concludes with a final event. It brings together top-level karate athletes from around the world competing in both kata and kumite disciplines.

This series is considered one of the most important events in international karate, as it contributes to the global ranking of athletes.

== Events ==
Karate 1 – Premier League 2016
Stages	Date	Series	City	Country
1	22–24 January 2016	Premier League – Paris	Paris	France
2	27–28 February 2016	Premier League – Sharm El Sheikh	Sharm El Sheikh	Egypt
3	12 March 2016	World Cup – Laško	Laško	Slovenia
4	19–20 March 2016	Premier League – Rotterdam	Rotterdam	Netherlands
5	8–10 April 2016	Premier League – Dubai	Dubai	United Arab Emirates
6	15–17 April 2016	Premier League – Salzburg	Salzburg	Austria
7	20–22 May 2016	Premier League – Rabat	Rabat	Morocco
8	3–4 September 2016	Premier League – Istanbul	Istanbul	Turkey
9	17–18 September 2016	Premier League – Fortaleza	Fortaleza	Brazil
10	23–25 September 2016	Premier League – Hamburg	Hamburg	Germany
11	1–2 October 2016	Premier League – Okinawa	Okinawa	Japan

== Karate1 Premier League - Paris 2016 ==
The Karate 1 Premier League – Paris 2016 was held on 22–24 January 2016 in Paris, France.

=== Men ===
Event	Gold	Silver	Bronze
Individual kata	Ryo Kiyuna; Japan	Issei Shimbaba; Japan	Mehmet Yakan; Turkey
Individual kata	Ryo Kiyuna; Japan	Issei Shimbaba; Japan	Vu Duc Minh Dack; France
Kumite -60 kg	Ihor Uhnich; Ukraine	Firdovsi Farzaliyev; Azerbaijan	Angelo Crescenzo; Italy
Kumite -60 kg	Ihor Uhnich; Ukraine	Firdovsi Farzaliyev; Azerbaijan	Emad Almalki; Saudi Arabia
Kumite -67 kg	Saeid Ahmadikaryani; Iran	Marvin Garin; France	Hiroto Shinohara; Japan
Kumite -67 kg	Saeid Ahmadikaryani; Iran	Marvin Garin; France	Burak Uygur; Turkey
Kumite -75 kg	Thomas Scott; United States	Luigi Busa; Italy	Logan Da Costa; France
Kumite -75 kg	Thomas Scott; United States	Luigi Busa; Italy	Reda Messaoudi; Morocco
Kumite -84 kg	Ryutaro Araga; Japan	Zabiollah Poorshab; Iran	Gokhan Gunduz; Turkey
Kumite -84 kg	Ryutaro Araga; Japan	Zabiollah Poorshab; Iran	Georgios Tzanos; Greece
Kumite +84 kg	Enes Erkan; Turkey	Shahin Atamov; Azerbaijan	Lonni Boulesnane; France
Kumite +84 kg	Enes Erkan; Turkey	Shahin Atamov; Azerbaijan	Salim Bendiab; France
Team Kata	France; Ahmed Zemouri; Enzo Montarello; Lucas Jeannot	Germany; Laurenz Berner; Philip Juettner; Paul Baum	Spain; Jorge Juan Martinez Cruz; Aitor Perez Gromaz; Xavier Talavera Romero
Team Kata	France; Ahmed Zemouri; Enzo Montarello; Lucas Jeannot	Germany; Laurenz Berner; Philip Juettner; Paul Baum	Morocco; Bilal Benkacem; Mohammed El Hanni; Adnane El Hakimi

=== Women ===
Event	Gold	Silver	Bronze
Individual kata	Shimizu Kiyou; Japan	Iwamoto Emiri; Japan	Sara Battaglia; Italy
Individual kata	Shimizu Kiyou; Japan	Iwamoto Emiri; Japan	Sakura Kokumai; United States
Kumite -50 kg	Alexandra Recchia; France	Silvia Sassano; Italy	Khawla Ouhammad; Morocco
Kumite -50 kg	Alexandra Recchia; France	Silvia Sassano; Italy	Serap Özçelik; Turkey
Kumite -55 kg	Cristina Ferrer García; Spain	Anzhelika Terliuga; Ukraine	Andrea Brito; France
Kumite -55 kg	Cristina Ferrer García; Spain	Anzhelika Terliuga; Ukraine	Maeva Samy; France
Kumite -61 kg	Merve Çoban; Turkey	Lolita Dona; France	Leila Heurtault; France
Kumite -61 kg	Merve Çoban; Turkey	Lolita Dona; France	Jacqueline Factos; Ecuador
Kumite -68 kg	Vassiliki Panetsidou; Greece	Elena Quirici; Switzerland	Alizée Agier; France
Kumite -68 kg	Vassiliki Panetsidou; Greece	Elena Quirici; Switzerland	Marina Raković; Montenegro
Kumite +68 kg	Anne-Laure Florentin; France	Buse Avcu; Turkey	Hamideh Abbasali; Iran
Kumite +68 kg	Anne-Laure Florentin; France	Buse Avcu; Turkey	Nadège Aït Ibrahim; France
Team kata	Italy; Sara Battaglia; Viviana Bottaro; Michela Pezzetti	France; Sandy Scordo; Marie Bui; Lila Bui	France; Emeline Joujou; Laetitia Feracci; Alexandra Feracci
Team kata	Italy; Sara Battaglia; Viviana Bottaro; Michela Pezzetti	France; Sandy Scordo; Marie Bui; Lila Bui	Slovakia; Nikoleta Merasicka; Ema Brazdova; Ludmila Bacikova

== Karate1 Premier League - Sharm El Sheikh 2016 ==
The Karate 1 Premier League – Sharm El Sheikh 2016 was held on 27–28 February 2016 in Sharm El Sheikh, Egypt.

=== Men ===
Event	Gold	Silver	Bronze
Individual kata	Francisco Jose Salazar Jover; Spain	Benkacem Bilal; Morocco	Ahmed El Swafy; Egypt
Individual kata	Francisco Jose Salazar Jover; Spain	Benkacem Bilal; Morocco	Islam Hassan; Egypt
Kumite -60 kg	Abdulhadi Almalki; Saudi Arabia	Matias Gomez Garcia; Spain	Malek Salama; Egypt
Kumite -60 kg	Abdulhadi Almalki; Saudi Arabia	Matias Gomez Garcia; Spain	Saud Albasher; Saudi Arabia
Kumite -67 kg	Bashar Al Najjar; Jordan	Abdelilah Boujdi; Morocco	Bader Alotaibi; Saudi Arabia
Kumite -67 kg	Bashar Al Najjar; Jordan	Abdelilah Boujdi; Morocco	Magdy Hanafy; Egypt
Kumite -75 kg	Omar Abdel Rahman; Egypt	Majed Al Khalifah; Saudi Arabia	Abdelrahman Mohamed; Egypt
Kumite -75 kg	Omar Abdel Rahman; Egypt	Majed Al Khalifah; Saudi Arabia	Hatem Aldweik; Jordan
Kumite -84 kg	Abdalla Ibrahim; Egypt	Ibrahim Nantumi; Saudi Arabia	Hany Keshta; Egypt
Kumite -84 kg	Abdalla Ibrahim; Egypt	Ibrahim Nantumi; Saudi Arabia	Nadhir Boukachta; Tunisia
Kumite +84 kg	Achraf Ouchen; Morocco	Ahmed El Asfar; Egypt	Marouane Ezzar; Tunisia
Kumite +84 kg	Achraf Ouchen; Morocco	Ahmed El Asfar; Egypt	Morgan Moss; South Africa
Team kata	Morocco; Benkacem Bilal; El Hanni Mohammed; El Hakimi Adnane	Egypt; Salem Mohamed; Refat Abdelrahman; Ahmed El Swafy	Egypt; Hamid Saadeldin; Ibrahim Ahmed; Khalil Amr
Team kata	Morocco; Benkacem Bilal; El Hanni Mohammed; El Hakimi Adnane	Egypt; Salem Mohamed; Refat Abdelrahman; Ahmed El Swafy	Egypt; Fawzy Omar; Ismail Ahmed; Youssef Ahmed

=== Women ===
Event	Gold	Silver	Bronze
Individual kata	Sandra Sanchez Jaime; Spain	Sanae Agalmam; Morocco	Aya Ismail; Egypt
Individual kata	Sandra Sanchez Jaime; Spain	Sanae Agalmam; Morocco	Zeinab Badawy; Egypt
Kumite -50 kg	Areeg Rashed; Egypt	Serap Özçelik; Turkey	Kateryna Kryva; Ukraine
Kumite -50 kg	Areeg Rashed; Egypt	Serap Özçelik; Turkey	Mona Khairy Abdelazim; Egypt
Kumite -55 kg	Aya Shaaban; Egypt	Mennatallah Ibrahim; Egypt	Anzhelika Terliuga; Ukraine
Kumite -55 kg	Aya Shaaban; Egypt	Mennatallah Ibrahim; Egypt	Aya Zeinhom; Egypt
Kumite -61 kg	Giana Lotfy; Egypt	Mouna Shheber; Syria	Randa Mahmoud; Egypt
Kumite -61 kg	Giana Lotfy; Egypt	Mouna Shheber; Syria	Iman Mohamed; Egypt
Kumite -68 kg	Cristina Vizcaino Gonzalez; Spain	Aya Aly; Egypt	Yasmine Ezzat; Egypt
Kumite -68 kg	Cristina Vizcaino Gonzalez; Spain	Aya Aly; Egypt	Chaima Bouaziz; Tunisia
Kumite +68 kg	Anastasiya Stepashko; Ukraine	Sohila Hussam; Egypt	Buse Avcu; Turkey
Kumite +68 kg	Anastasiya Stepashko; Ukraine	Sohila Hussam; Egypt	Asmaa Ezat; Egypt
Team kata	Egypt; Randa Abdelaziz; Aya Ismail; Shaimaa Roshdy	Egypt; Miram Abdelaziz; Amira El-Huseiny; Maya El-Sayed	Egypt; Mirna El Shenawy; Amira Fekry; Narden Sayed
Team kata	Egypt; Randa Abdelaziz; Aya Ismail; Shaimaa Roshdy	Egypt; Miram Abdelaziz; Amira El-Huseiny; Maya El-Sayed	Egypt; Salonaz Abdel Galil; Shorouq Roushdy; Donia Sabir

== Karate1 World Cup - Lasko 2016 ==
The Karate 1 World Cup – Laško 2016 was held on 12–13 March 2016 in Laško, Slovenia.

=== Men ===
Event	Gold	Silver	Bronze
Individual kata	Mohamed Hamdy Sayed; Egypt	Mehmet Yakan; Turkey	Mohammed El Hanni; Morocco
Individual kata	Mohamed Hamdy Sayed; Egypt	Mehmet Yakan; Turkey	Adnane Elhakimi; Morocco
Kumite -60 kg	Emad Al Malki; Saudi Arabia	Saud Albasher; Saudi Arabia	Mohammed Benathmane; Algeria
Kumite -60 kg	Emad Al Malki; Saudi Arabia	Saud Albasher; Saudi Arabia	Oleh Filipovych; Ukraine
Kumite -67 kg	Stefan Pokorny; Austria	Nenad Kelebic; North Macedonia	Stefan Joksic; Serbia
Kumite -67 kg	Stefan Pokorny; Austria	Nenad Kelebic; North Macedonia	Yves Martial Tadissi; Hungary
Kumite -75 kg	Ivo Cvetkovski; North Macedonia	Majed Alkhalifah; Saudi Arabia	Murat Sahin; Switzerland
Kumite -75 kg	Ivo Cvetkovski; North Macedonia	Majed Alkhalifah; Saudi Arabia	Jay Ryan; England
Kumite -84 kg	Meris Muhovic; Bosnia and Herzegovina	Hacene Guiri; Algeria	Jus Markac; Slovenia
Kumite -84 kg	Meris Muhovic; Bosnia and Herzegovina	Hacene Guiri; Algeria	Anes Congo; Bosnia and Herzegovina
Kumite +84 kg	Andjelo Kvesic; Croatia	Ziya Yasar; Turkey	Missipsa Hamadini; Algeria
Kumite +84 kg	Andjelo Kvesic; Croatia	Ziya Yasar; Turkey	Sanin Kanlic; Bosnia and Herzegovina

=== Women ===
Event	Gold	Silver	Bronze
Individual kata	Lau Mo Sheung Grace; Hong Kong	Radulovic Biserka; Montenegro	Tung Yee Yin; Hong Kong
Individual kata	Lau Mo Sheung Grace; Hong Kong	Radulovic Biserka; Montenegro	Yermakova Sviatlana; Belarus
Kumite -50 kg	Radicevska Sara; North Macedonia	Milivojcevic Jelena; Serbia	Plank Bettina; Austria
Kumite -50 kg	Radicevska Sara; North Macedonia	Milivojcevic Jelena; Serbia	Kryva Kateryna; Ukraine
Kumite -55 kg	Draskovic Ana; Montenegro	Kumizaki Valeria; Austria	Semanikova Viktoria; Slovakia
Kumite -55 kg	Draskovic Ana; Montenegro	Kumizaki Valeria; Austria	Rankovic Teodora; Serbia
Kumite -61 kg	Lenard Ana; Croatia	Serogina Anita; Ukraine	Maric Tina; Croatia
Kumite -61 kg	Lenard Ana; Croatia	Serogina Anita; Ukraine	Gataullina Nailya; Russia
Kumite -68 kg	Buchinger Alisa; Austria	Comagic Ivana; Serbia	Kaminska Iryna; Ukraine
Kumite -68 kg	Buchinger Alisa; Austria	Comagic Ivana; Serbia	Rakovic Marina; Montenegro
Kumite +68 kg	Martinovic Masa; Croatia	Konjevic Dragana; Montenegro	Tatarova Dominika; Slovakia
Kumite +68 kg	Martinovic Masa; Croatia	Konjevic Dragana; Montenegro	Dragusha Diellza; Kosovo

== Karate1 Premier League - Rotterdam 2016 ==
The Karate 1 Premier League – Rotterdam 2016 was held on 19–20 March 2016 in Rotterdam, Netherlands.

=== Men ===
Event	Gold	Silver	Bronze
Individual kata	Damian Quintero; Spain	Minh Duc Dack Vu; France	Cheng Tsz Man Chris; Hong Kong
Individual kata	Damian Quintero; Spain	Minh Duc Dack Vu; France	Mehmet Yakan; Turkey
Kumite -60 kg	Geoffrey Berens; Netherlands	Michael Dasoul; Belgium	David Tchebuchava; Georgia
Kumite -60 kg	Geoffrey Berens; Netherlands	Michael Dasoul; Belgium	Matías Gómez; Spain
Kumite -67 kg	Assylbek Muratov; Kazakhstan	Steven Da Costa; France	Youssef Chabab; Morocco
Kumite -67 kg	Assylbek Muratov; Kazakhstan	Steven Da Costa; France	Abdelilah Boujdi; Morocco
Kumite -75 kg	Erman Eltemur; Turkey	Gabor Harspataki; Hungary	Thomas Andrew Scott; United States
Kumite -75 kg	Erman Eltemur; Turkey	Gabor Harspataki; Hungary	Rene Smaal; Netherlands
Kumite -84 kg	Timothy Petersen; Netherlands	Aykut Usta; Turkey	Miguel Amargos; Argentina
Kumite -84 kg	Timothy Petersen; Netherlands	Aykut Usta; Turkey	Ugur Aktas; Turkey
Kumite 84+ kg	Ridvan Kaptan; Turkey	Enes Erkan; Turkey	Jonathan Horne; Germany
Kumite 84+ kg	Ridvan Kaptan; Turkey	Enes Erkan; Turkey	Gokhan Gunduz; Turkey
Team kata	Turkey; Osman Evin; Mehmet Yakan; Fikret Yilmaz	Hong Kong; Cheng Tsz Man Chris; Lau Chi Ming; Yu Ho Cheung	France; Lucas Jeannot; Enzo Montarello; Ahmed Zemouri
Team kata	Turkey; Osman Evin; Mehmet Yakan; Fikret Yilmaz	Hong Kong; Cheng Tsz Man Chris; Lau Chi Ming; Yu Ho Cheung	Germany; Jonas Glaser; Joshua Spannaus; Jan Urke

=== Women ===
Event	Gold	Silver	Bronze
Individual kata	Emiri Iwamoto; Japan	Gema Morales Ozuna; Spain	Sakura Kokumai; United States
Individual kata	Emiri Iwamoto; Japan	Gema Morales Ozuna; Spain	Mo Sheung Grace Lau; Hong Kong
Kumite -50 kg	Alexandra Recchia; France	Kateryna Kryva; Ukraine	Srunita Sari; Indonesia
Kumite -50 kg	Alexandra Recchia; France	Kateryna Kryva; Ukraine	Rocío Sánchez; Spain
Kumite -55 kg	Jennifer Warling; Luxembourg	Émilie Thouy; France	Kathryn Campbell; Canada
Kumite -55 kg	Jennifer Warling; Luxembourg	Émilie Thouy; France	Anzhelika Terliuga; Ukraine
Kumite -61 kg	Lucie Ignace; France	Nailya Gataullina; Russia	Jacqueline Factos; Ecuador
Kumite -61 kg	Lucie Ignace; France	Nailya Gataullina; Russia	Anita Serogina; Ukraine
Kumite -68 kg	Vasiliki Panetsidou; France	Guzaliya Gafurova; Kazakhstan	Alisa Buchinger; Austria
Kumite -68 kg	Vasiliki Panetsidou; France	Guzaliya Gafurova; Kazakhstan	Iryna Zaretska; Azerbaijan
Kumite 68+ kg	Vanesca Tania Nortan; Netherlands	Hamideh Abbasali; Iran	Dominika Tatarova; Slovakia
Kumite 68+ kg	Vanesca Tania Nortan; Netherlands	Hamideh Abbasali; Iran	Fanny Clavien; Switzerland
Team kata	France; Lila Bui; Marie Bui; Sandy Scordo	Turkey; Dilara Bozan; Rabia Küsmeş; Gizem Şahin	Spain; Marta Vega Letamendi; Jessica Moreno Wilkinson; Carmen García Capitán
Team kata	France; Lila Bui; Marie Bui; Sandy Scordo	Turkey; Dilara Bozan; Rabia Küsmeş; Gizem Şahin	Germany; Jasmin Bleul; Christine Heinrich; Sophie Wachter

== Karate1 Premier League - Dubai 2016 ==
The Karate 1 Premier League – Dubai 2016 was held on 8–10 April 2016 in Dubai, United Arab Emirates.

=== Men ===
Event	Gold	Silver	Bronze
Individual kata	Damian Quintero; United Arab Emirates	Laurenz Berner; Germany	Emmanuel Leong; Malaysia
Individual kata	Damian Quintero; United Arab Emirates	Laurenz Berner; Germany	Ali Sofuoglu; Turkey
Kumite -60 kg	Angelo Crescenzo; Italy	Darkhan Assadilov; Kazakhstan	Luca Maresca; Italy
Kumite -60 kg	Angelo Crescenzo; Italy	Darkhan Assadilov; Kazakhstan	Michael Dasoul; Belgium
Kumite -67 kg	Ali Elsawy; Egypt	Bashar Al Najjar; Jordan	Bader Alotaibi; Saudi Arabia
Kumite -67 kg	Ali Elsawy; Egypt	Bashar Al Najjar; Jordan	Rinat Sagandykov; Kazakhstan
Kumite -75 kg	Rafael Aghayev; Azerbaijan	Bahman Asgari Ghoncheh; Iran	Hatem Aldweik; Jordan
Kumite -75 kg	Rafael Aghayev; Azerbaijan	Bahman Asgari Ghoncheh; Iran	Andrei Ganzen; Russia
Kumite -84 kg	Ugur Aktas; Turkey	Mohamed Elkotby; Egypt	Raef Alturkistani; Saudi Arabia
Kumite -84 kg	Ugur Aktas; Turkey	Mohamed Elkotby; Egypt	Zabiollah Poorshab; Iran
Kumite 84+ kg	Ahmed Said; United Arab Emirates	Shahin Atamov; Azerbaijan	Enes Erkan; Turkey
Kumite 84+ kg	Ahmed Said; United Arab Emirates	Shahin Atamov; Azerbaijan	Jonathan Horne; Germany
Team kata	Malaysia; Thomson Hoe; Emmanuel Leong; Ivan Oh Theng Wei	Hong Kong; Cheng Tsz Man Chris; Howard Hung Ho Wai; Lau Chi Ming	Iran; Roozbeh Roshani; Soheil Sajedi Far; Amir Bahador Tadayon
Team kata	Malaysia; Thomson Hoe; Emmanuel Leong; Ivan Oh Theng Wei	Hong Kong; Cheng Tsz Man Chris; Howard Hung Ho Wai; Lau Chi Ming	Italy; Mattia Busato; Alessandro Iodice; Alfredo Tocco

=== Women ===
Event	Gold	Silver	Bronze
Individual kata	Sandra Sanchez Jaime; United Arab Emirates	Sara Battaglia; Italy	Mo Sheung Grace Lau; Hong Kong
Individual kata	Sandra Sanchez Jaime; United Arab Emirates	Sara Battaglia; Italy	Celine Xin Yi Lee; Malaysia
Kumite -50 kg	Bettina Plank; Austria	Radwa Radwan; United Arab Emirates	Areeg Rashed; Egypt
Kumite -50 kg	Bettina Plank; Austria	Radwa Radwan; United Arab Emirates	Shara Wynn Hubrich; Germany
Kumite -55 kg	Syakilla Salni Jefry Krishnan; Malaysia	Sara Cardin; Italy	Esraa Abdelkader; United Arab Emirates
Kumite -55 kg	Syakilla Salni Jefry Krishnan; Malaysia	Sara Cardin; Italy	Valeria Finashkina; Russia
Kumite -61 kg	Giana Farouk; Egypt	Ingrida Suchankova; Slovakia	Boutheina Hasnaoui; Tunisia
Kumite -61 kg	Giana Farouk; Egypt	Ingrida Suchankova; Slovakia	Barno Mirzaeva; Uzbekistan
Kumite -68 kg	Silvia Semeraro; Italy	Inga Sherozia; Russia	Guzaliya Gafurova; Kazakhstan
Kumite -68 kg	Silvia Semeraro; Italy	Inga Sherozia; Russia	Kamila Warda; Poland
Kumite 68+ kg	Fanny Clavien; Switzerland	Aisha Mohamed; Egypt	Dominika Tatarova; Slovakia
Kumite 68+ kg	Fanny Clavien; Switzerland	Aisha Mohamed; Egypt	Sohila Abouismail; Egypt
Team kata	Italy; Sara Battaglia; Viviana Bottaro; Michela Pezzetti	Malaysia; Khaw Yee Voon; Celine Xin Yi Lee; Thor Chee Yee	Germany; Jasmin Bleul; Christine Heinrich; Sophie Wachter
Team kata	Italy; Sara Battaglia; Viviana Bottaro; Michela Pezzetti	Malaysia; Khaw Yee Voon; Celine Xin Yi Lee; Thor Chee Yee	Iran; Saeedeh Javeri; Maryam Karimi Khouzani; Nooshin Khalafiyan

== Karate1 Premier League - Salzburg 2016 ==
The Karate 1 Premier League – Salzburg 2016 was held on 15–17 April 2016 in Salzburg, Austria.

=== Men ===
Event	Gold	Silver	Bronze
Individual kata	Antonio Diaz; Venezuela	Damian Quintero; United Arab Emirates	Szabolcs Koch; Hungary
Individual kata	Antonio Diaz; Venezuela	Damian Quintero; United Arab Emirates	Issei Shimbaba; Japan
Kumite -60 kg	Marko Antic; Serbia	Emil Pavlov; North Macedonia	Oleh Filipovych; Ukraine
Kumite -60 kg	Marko Antic; Serbia	Emil Pavlov; North Macedonia	Geoffrey Berens; Netherlands
Kumite -67 kg	Vinicius Figueira; Brazil	Thomas Kaserer; Austria	Luca Rettenbacher; Austria
Kumite -67 kg	Vinicius Figueira; Brazil	Thomas Kaserer; Austria	Mensur Djozic; Bosnia and Herzegovina
Kumite -75 kg	Daisuke Watanabe; Japan	Ken Nishimura; Japan	Ivan Martinac; Croatia
Kumite -75 kg	Daisuke Watanabe; Japan	Ken Nishimura; Japan	Sabir Ahmet Uygur; Turkey
Kumite -84 kg	Ryutaro Araga; Japan	Alvin Karaqi; Kosovo	Valerii Chobotar; Ukraine
Kumite -84 kg	Ryutaro Araga; Japan	Alvin Karaqi; Kosovo	Berat Jakupi; North Macedonia
Kumite 84+ kg	Slobodan Bitevic; Serbia	Moreno Sheppard; Netherlands	Zarko Arsovski; North Macedonia
Kumite 84+ kg	Slobodan Bitevic; Serbia	Moreno Sheppard; Netherlands	Herolind Nisheci; Kosovo
Team kata	Hong Kong; Cheng Tsz Man Chris; Lau Chi Ming; Yu Ho Cheung	Croatia; Ivan Ermenc; Damjan Padovan; Tomislav Stolar	Poland; Bartosz Maczka; Maksymilian Szczypkowski; Mateusz Tomiczek
Team kata	Hong Kong; Cheng Tsz Man Chris; Lau Chi Ming; Yu Ho Cheung	Croatia; Ivan Ermenc; Damjan Padovan; Tomislav Stolar	Serbia; Vukasin Petrovic; Dragutin Simovic; Djordje Todorovic

=== Women ===
Event	Gold	Silver	Bronze
Individual kata	Kiyou Shimizu; Japan	Emiri Iwamoto; Japan	Biserka Radulovic; Montenegro
Individual kata	Kiyou Shimizu; Japan	Emiri Iwamoto; Japan	Alzbeta Oveckova; Slovakia
Kumite -50 kg	Ayaka Tadano; Japan	Bettina Plank; Austria	Shree Sharmin Segaran; Malaysia
Kumite -50 kg	Ayaka Tadano; Japan	Bettina Plank; Austria	Kateryna Kryva; Ukraine
Kumite -55 kg	Valeria Kumizaki; Austria	Syakilla Salni Jefry Krishnan; Malaysia	Jelena Kovacevic; Croatia
Kumite -55 kg	Valeria Kumizaki; Austria	Syakilla Salni Jefry Krishnan; Malaysia	Viktoria Semanikova; Slovakia
Kumite -61 kg	Alexandra Grande; Peru	Nicole Forcella; Italy	Tina Maric; Croatia
Kumite -61 kg	Alexandra Grande; Peru	Nicole Forcella; Italy	Natasha Stefanovska; North Macedonia
Kumite -68 kg	Alisa Buchinger; Austria	Luana Debatty; Belgium	Katrine Pedersen; Denmark
Kumite -68 kg	Alisa Buchinger; Austria	Luana Debatty; Belgium	Kayo Someya; Japan
Kumite 68+ kg	Ayumi Uekusa; Japan	Helena Kuusisto; Finland	Natsumi Kawamura; Japan
Kumite 68+ kg	Ayumi Uekusa; Japan	Helena Kuusisto; Finland	Andriana Vicovac; Serbia
Team kata	Slovakia; Ludmila Bacikova; Ema Brazdova; Nikoleta Merasicka	Vietnam; Thi Hang Nguyen; Thi Thu Ha Do; Ha Mi Do	Croatia; Nika Jukic; Vlatka Kiuk; Mihaela Petrovic
Team kata	Slovakia; Ludmila Bacikova; Ema Brazdova; Nikoleta Merasicka	Vietnam; Thi Hang Nguyen; Thi Thu Ha Do; Ha Mi Do	North Macedonia; Marijana Dimoska; Misela Dimoska; Puleksenija Jovanoska

== Karate1 Premier League - Rabat 2016 ==
The Karate 1 Premier League – Rabat 2016 was held on 20–22 May 2016 in Rabat, Morocco.

=== Men ===
Event	Gold	Silver	Bronze
Individual kata	Damian Quintero; United Arab Emirates	Bilal Benkacem; Morocco	Mohammed El Hanni; Morocco
Individual kata	Damian Quintero; United Arab Emirates	Bilal Benkacem; Morocco	Adnane El Hakimi; Morocco
Kumite -60 kg	Emad Al Malki; Saudi Arabia	Abdullah Alharbi; Saudi Arabia	Abdulhadi Almalki; Saudi Arabia
Kumite -60 kg	Emad Al Malki; Saudi Arabia	Abdullah Alharbi; Saudi Arabia	Mohammed Taoussi; Morocco
Kumite -67 kg	Bashar Al Najjar; Jordan	Francesco D'Onofrio; Italy	Abdelilah Boujdi; Morocco
Kumite -67 kg	Bashar Al Najjar; Jordan	Francesco D'Onofrio; Italy	Fahad Alkhathami; Saudi Arabia
Kumite -75 kg	Khalid Alshaikhi; Saudi Arabia	Reda Messaoudi; Morocco	Jalal Bouzzher; Morocco
Kumite -75 kg	Khalid Alshaikhi; Saudi Arabia	Reda Messaoudi; Morocco	Majed Al Khalifah; Saudi Arabia
Kumite -84 kg	Amin Bouazza; France	Iliass Oufkir; Morocco	Saeed Qaffas; Saudi Arabia
Kumite -84 kg	Amin Bouazza; France	Iliass Oufkir; Morocco	Shvan Othman; Iraq
Kumite 84+ kg	Achraf Ouchen; Morocco	Etienne Martial Nonagni Bayomog; Cameroon	Hicham Mzara; Morocco
Kumite 84+ kg	Achraf Ouchen; Morocco	Etienne Martial Nonagni Bayomog; Cameroon	Reda El Asmar; Morocco
Team kata	Morocco; Bilal Benkacem; Mohammed El Hanni; Adnane El Hakimi	Italy; Simone Salsa; Gabriele Petroni; Andrea Nekoofar	Morocco; Mohammed Sedraoui; Mouad Ouarzazi; Marouane Maanaoui
Team kata	Morocco; Bilal Benkacem; Mohammed El Hanni; Adnane El Hakimi	Italy; Simone Salsa; Gabriele Petroni; Andrea Nekoofar	Morocco; Mohammed Chaari; Tarik Gueli; Souhail Zaaraoui

=== Women ===
Event	Gold	Silver	Bronze
Individual kata	Aya Nassiri; Morocco	Sandra Sanchez Jaime; United Arab Emirates	Sanae Agalmam; Morocco
Individual kata	Aya Nassiri; Morocco	Sandra Sanchez Jaime; United Arab Emirates	Rajae Ez-Zghary; Morocco
Kumite -50 kg	Khawla Ouhammad; Morocco	Eya Jemai; Tunisia	Imane Lkraidi; Morocco
Kumite -50 kg	Khawla Ouhammad; Morocco	Eya Jemai; Tunisia	Estela Benita Lopez; Spain
Kumite -55 kg	Oumaima El Absi; Morocco	Viktoria Semanikova; Slovakia	Ruth Lorenzo Couso; Spain
Kumite -55 kg	Oumaima El Absi; Morocco	Viktoria Semanikova; Slovakia	Wen Tzu Yun; Chinese Taipei
Kumite -61 kg	Ingrida Suchankova; Slovakia	Fatima Zahra Errabi; Morocco	Ikram Chayyoub; Morocco
Kumite -61 kg	Ingrida Suchankova; Slovakia	Fatima Zahra Errabi; Morocco	Hanane Zarka; Morocco
Kumite -68 kg	Silvia Semeraro; Italy	Chaima Midi; Algeria	Sara El Kharchi; Morocco
Kumite -68 kg	Silvia Semeraro; Italy	Chaima Midi; Algeria	Meryem Bouhid; Morocco
Kumite 68+ kg	Fatima Zahrae Aghardis; Morocco	Vera Kovaleva; Russia	Blandine Angama Mendo; Cameroon
Kumite 68+ kg	Fatima Zahrae Aghardis; Morocco	Vera Kovaleva; Russia	Vanesca Nortan; Netherlands
Team kata	Austria; Patricia Bahledova; Joan Marie Stadler; Kristin Wieninger	Morocco; Khadja Belamine; Salima Abderrahani; Zineb Rahoui	Cameroon; Sylvie Viviane Ambani; Alexandra Verica Ekani Ekani; Jacqueline Ornela Ngo Hiol Hiol
Team kata	Austria; Patricia Bahledova; Joan Marie Stadler; Kristin Wieninger	Morocco; Khadja Belamine; Salima Abderrahani; Zineb Rahoui	Morocco; Hiba Souhane; Manal Ouit; Ikram Erroudi

== Karate1 Premier League - Istanbul 2016 ==
The Karate 1 Premier League – Istanbul 2016 was held on 3–4 September 2016 in Istanbul, Turkey.

=== Men ===
Event	Gold	Silver	Bronze
Individual kata	Ali Sofuoglu; Turkey	Gokay Ilgezdi; Turkey	Adrian Guta; Romania
Individual kata	Ali Sofuoglu; Turkey	Gokay Ilgezdi; Turkey	Emrevefa Goktas; Turkey
Kumite -60 kg	Abdullah Alharbi; Saudi Arabia	Emad Al Malki; Saudi Arabia	Firdovsi Farzaliyev; Azerbaijan
Kumite -60 kg	Abdullah Alharbi; Saudi Arabia	Emad Al Malki; Saudi Arabia	Eyup Guler; Turkey
Kumite -67 kg	Muhammet Ali Yilmaz; Turkey	Davit Pataridze; Georgia	Fahad Alkhathami; Saudi Arabia
Kumite -67 kg	Muhammet Ali Yilmaz; Turkey	Davit Pataridze; Georgia	Burak Uygur; Turkey
Kumite -75 kg	Erman Eltemur; Turkey	Sabir Ahmet Uygur; Turkey	Majed Al Khalifah; Saudi Arabia
Kumite -75 kg	Erman Eltemur; Turkey	Sabir Ahmet Uygur; Turkey	Rafael Aghayev; Azerbaijan
Kumite -84 kg	Ugur Aktas; Turkey	Turgut Hasanov; Azerbaijan	Aykhan Mamayev; Azerbaijan
Kumite -84 kg	Ugur Aktas; Turkey	Turgut Hasanov; Azerbaijan	Petar Spasenovski; North Macedonia
Kumite 84+ kg	Enes Erkan; Turkey	Orkhan Heydarli; Azerbaijan	Asiman Gurbanli; Azerbaijan
Kumite 84+ kg	Enes Erkan; Turkey	Orkhan Heydarli; Azerbaijan	Ali Jafarov; Azerbaijan
Team kata	Turkey; Gokay Ilgezdi; Ali Sofuoglu; Metin Sofuoglu	Turkey; Emrevefa Goktas; Cengizhan Koca; Yusuf Yagiz Ucebakan	Turkey; Osman Evin; Selahattin Gungel; Mehmet Yakan
Team kata	Turkey; Gokay Ilgezdi; Ali Sofuoglu; Metin Sofuoglu	Turkey; Emrevefa Goktas; Cengizhan Koca; Yusuf Yagiz Ucebakan	Saudi Arabia; Mesfer Alasmari; Rakan Albadri; Saleem Alsirhani

=== Women ===
Event	Gold	Silver	Bronze
Individual kata	Sandra Sanchez Jaime; United Arab Emirates	Negin Bagheri Bazardeh; Iran	Busrnur Kilic; Turkey
Individual kata	Sandra Sanchez Jaime; United Arab Emirates	Negin Bagheri Bazardeh; Iran	Dilara Bozan; Turkey
Kumite -50 kg	Serap Ozcelik; Turkey	Kateryna Kryva; Ukraine	Shree Sharmin Segaran; Malaysia
Kumite -50 kg	Serap Ozcelik; Turkey	Kateryna Kryva; Ukraine	Büsra Yildiz; Turkey
Kumite -55 kg	Wen Tzu Yun; Chinese Taipei	Büsra Tosun; Turkey	Syakilla Salni Jefry Krishnan; Malaysia
Kumite -55 kg	Wen Tzu Yun; Chinese Taipei	Büsra Tosun; Turkey	Talya Pekmezoglu; Turkey
Kumite -61 kg	Tjasa Ristic; Slovenia	Jacqueline Factos; Ecuador	Sahika Yildiz; Turkey
Kumite -61 kg	Tjasa Ristic; Slovenia	Jacqueline Factos; Ecuador	Ana Lenard; Croatia
Kumite -68 kg	Büsra Turan; Turkey	Elena Quirici; Switzerland	Vassiliki Panetsidou; Greece
Kumite -68 kg	Büsra Turan; Turkey	Elena Quirici; Switzerland	Marina Rakovic; Montenegro
Kumite 68+ kg	Masa Vidic; Croatia	Meltem Hocaoglu; Turkey	Alexandrina Mirea; Romania
Kumite 68+ kg	Masa Vidic; Croatia	Meltem Hocaoglu; Turkey	Farida Aliyeva; Azerbaijan
Team kata	Turkey; Dilara Bozan; Rabia Küsmeş; Gizem Şahin	North Macedonia; Marijana Dimoska; Misela Dimoska; Puleksenija Jovanoska	Turkey; Beyza Nur Ay; Bigem Giroglu; Emine Korkutmus
Team kata	Turkey; Dilara Bozan; Rabia Küsmeş; Gizem Şahin	North Macedonia; Marijana Dimoska; Misela Dimoska; Puleksenija Jovanoska	Turkey; Sumeyra Celik; Ceren Aybike Demiral; Busranur Kilic

== Karate1 Premier League - Fortaleza 2016 ==
The Karate 1 Premier League – Fortaleza 2016 was held on 17–18 September 2016 in Fortaleza, Brazil.

=== Men ===
Event	Gold	Silver	Bronze
Individual kata	Lucas Santos; Brazil	Willames Souza Santos; Brazil	Luiz Inacio de Lima Junior; Brazil
Individual kata	Lucas Santos; Brazil	Willames Souza Santos; Brazil	Fabrice Chiron; Brazil
Kumite -60 kg	Douglas Brose; Brazil	Miguel Soffia; Chile	Pablo Pallavicini; Chile
Kumite -60 kg	Douglas Brose; Brazil	Miguel Soffia; Chile	Edemilson dos Santos; Brazil
Kumite -67 kg	Breno Teixeira; Brazil	Vinicius Figueira; Brazil	Camilo Velozo; Chile
Kumite -67 kg	Breno Teixeira; Brazil	Vinicius Figueira; Brazil	Israel Santana Montecinos; Chile
Kumite -75 kg	Hernani Verissimo; Brazil	German Charpentier; Chile	Milton Menezes; Brazil
Kumite -75 kg	Hernani Verissimo; Brazil	German Charpentier; Chile	David Nascimento; Brazil
Kumite -84 kg	Adam Ramos; Brazil	Miguel Amargos; Argentina	Julio Cesar da Silva; Brazil
Kumite -84 kg	Adam Ramos; Brazil	Miguel Amargos; Argentina	Randal von Marttens; Chile
Kumite 84+ kg	Rodrigo Rojas; Chile	Franco Recouso; Argentina	Paulo Victor Silva; Brazil
Kumite 84+ kg	Rodrigo Rojas; Chile	Franco Recouso; Argentina	Ramon Rocha de Fernandes; Brazil
Team kata	Brazil; Willames Souza Santos; Eric Nascimento; Frederico da Silva Rocha	Brazil; Luiz Inacio de Lima Junior; Fabrice Chiron; Willian Junior Barbosa	

=== Women ===
Event	Gold	Silver	Bronze
Individual kata	Dorota Balciarova; Slovakia	Thainan Schopchaki; Brazil	Nicole Mota; Brazil
Individual kata	Dorota Balciarova; Slovakia	Thainan Schopchaki; Brazil	Claudina de Souza Aguiar; Brazil
Kumite -50 kg	Giovanna Feroldi; Brazil	Gabriela Bruna; Chile	Aline de Paula; Brazil
Kumite -50 kg	Giovanna Feroldi; Brazil	Gabriela Bruna; Chile	Beatriz Mafra; Brazil
Kumite -55 kg	Valeria Kumizaki; Brazil	Viktoria Semanikova; Slovakia	Sabrina Pereira; Brazil
Kumite -55 kg	Valeria Kumizaki; Brazil	Viktoria Semanikova; Slovakia	Julia Hort Piccinini; Brazil
Kumite -61 kg	Ingrid Suchankova; Slovakia	Javiera Gonzalez Lavin; Chile	Erica dos Santos; Brazil
Kumite -61 kg	Ingrid Suchankova; Slovakia	Javiera Gonzalez Lavin; Chile	Stephani de Lima; Brazil
Kumite -68 kg	Alisa Buchinger; Austria	Leticia Brito Silveira; Brazil	Natalia Spigolon; Brazil
Kumite 68+ kg	Isabela Rodrigues; Brazil	Morgana Ferreira; Brazil	Evelyn Vieira; Brazil
Kumite 68+ kg	Isabela Rodrigues; Brazil	Morgana Ferreira; Brazil	Aline Martins; Brazil
Team kata	Brazil; Dorota Balciarova; Willames Souza Santos; Frederico da Silva Rocha	Brazil; Luiz Inacio de Lima Junior; Fabrice Chiron; Willian Junior Barbosa	Brazil; Eric Nascimento; Douglas Brose; Breno Teixeira

== Karate1 Premier League - Hamburg 2016 ==
The Karate 1 Premier League – Hamburg 2016 was held on 23–25 September 2016 in Hamburg, Germany.

=== Men ===
Event	Gold	Silver	Bronze
Individual kata	Antonio Diaz; Venezuela	Damian Quintero; Spain	Issei Shimbaba; Japan
Individual kata	Antonio Diaz; Venezuela	Damian Quintero; Spain	Samuel Stea; Italy
Kumite -60 kg	Douglas Brose; Brazil	Firdovsi Farzaliyev; Azerbaijan	Darkhan Assadilov; Kazakhstan
Kumite -60 kg	Douglas Brose; Brazil	Firdovsi Farzaliyev; Azerbaijan	Angelo Crescenzo; Italy
Kumite -67 kg	Magdy Hanafy; Egypt	Vinicius Figueira; Brazil	Yves Martial Tadissi; Hungary
Kumite -67 kg	Magdy Hanafy; Egypt	Vinicius Figueira; Brazil	Rafiz Hasanov; Azerbaijan
Kumite -75 kg	Ken Nishimura; Japan	Omar Abdel Rahman; Egypt	Thomas Scott; United States
Kumite -75 kg	Ken Nishimura; Japan	Omar Abdel Rahman; Egypt	Rafael Aghayev; Azerbaijan
Kumite -84 kg	Ryutaro Araga; Japan	Mohamed El Kotby; Egypt	Valerii Chobotar; Ukraine
Kumite -84 kg	Ryutaro Araga; Japan	Mohamed El Kotby; Egypt	Noah Bitsch; Germany
Kumite 84+ kg	Asiman Gurbanli; Azerbaijan	Jonathan Horne; Germany	Enes Erkan; Turkey
Kumite 84+ kg	Asiman Gurbanli; Azerbaijan	Jonathan Horne; Germany	Slobodan Bitevic; Serbia
Team kata	Italy; Mattia Busato; Alessandro Iodice; Alfredo Tocco	Egypt; Ahmed Ibrahim Magdy; Mohamed Hamdy Sayed; Ahmed Shawky	France; Lucas Jeannot; Enzo Montarello; Ahmed Zemouri
Team kata	Italy; Mattia Busato; Alessandro Iodice; Alfredo Tocco	Egypt; Ahmed Ibrahim Magdy; Mohamed Hamdy Sayed; Ahmed Shawky	Spain; Jose Manuel Carbonell; Damian Quintero; Francisco Jose Salazar Jover

=== Women ===
Event	Gold	Silver	Bronze
Individual kata	Viviana Bottaro; Italy	Aya Ismail; Egypt	Maria Dimitrova; Dominican Republic
Individual kata	Viviana Bottaro; Italy	Aya Ismail; Egypt	Carola Casale; Italy
Kumite -50 kg	Radwa Sayed; Egypt	Ayaka Tadano; Japan	Nurana Aliyeva; Azerbaijan
Kumite -50 kg	Radwa Sayed; Egypt	Ayaka Tadano; Japan	Bettina Plank; Austria
Kumite -55 kg	Emilie Thouy; France	Syakilla Salni Jefry Krishnan; Malaysia	Sara Cardin; Italy
Kumite -55 kg	Emilie Thouy; France	Syakilla Salni Jefry Krishnan; Malaysia	Sara Yamada; Japan
Kumite -61 kg	Giana Lotfy; Egypt	Javiera Gonzalez Lavin; Chile	Jacqueline Factos; Ecuador
Kumite -61 kg	Giana Lotfy; Egypt	Javiera Gonzalez Lavin; Chile	Mayumi Someya; Japan
Kumite -68 kg	Iryna Zaretska; Azerbaijan	Cheryl Murphy; United States	Elena Quirici; Switzerland
Kumite -68 kg	Iryna Zaretska; Azerbaijan	Cheryl Murphy; United States	Nada Mohamed; Egypt
Kumite 68+ kg	Natsumi Kawamura; Japan	Ayumi Uekusa; Japan	Anastasiia Stepashko; Ukraine
Kumite 68+ kg	Natsumi Kawamura; Japan	Ayumi Uekusa; Japan	Valeria Echever; Ecuador
Team kata	Italy; Sara Battaglia; Viviana Bottaro; Michela Pezzetti	Germany; Sophie Wachter; Christine Heinrich; Jasmin Bleul	France; Lila Bu; Marie Bu; Sandy Scordo
Team kata	Italy; Sara Battaglia; Viviana Bottaro; Michela Pezzetti	Germany; Sophie Wachter; Christine Heinrich; Jasmin Bleul	Spain; Margarita Morata Martos; Gema Morales; Paula Rodríguez Nieto

== Karate1 Premier League - Okinawa 2016 ==
The Karate 1 Premier League – Okinawa 2016 was held on 1–2 October 2016 in Okinawa, Japan.

=== Men ===
Event	Gold	Silver	Bronze
Individual kata	Ryo Kiyuna; Japan	Takuya Uemura; Japan	Chikashi Hayashida; Japan
Individual kata	Ryo Kiyuna; Japan	Takuya Uemura; Japan	Daisuke Funakoshi; Japan
Kumite -60 kg	Taihei Hanaguruma; Japan	Abdullah Alharbi; Saudi Arabia	Naoto Sago; Japan
Kumite -60 kg	Taihei Hanaguruma; Japan	Abdullah Alharbi; Saudi Arabia	Takumi Imoto; Japan
Kumite -67 kg	Yves Martial Tadissi; Hungary	Fahad Alkhathami; Saudi Arabia	Bader Alotaibi; Saudi Arabia
Kumite -67 kg	Yves Martial Tadissi; Hungary	Fahad Alkhathami; Saudi Arabia	Soichiro Nakano; Japan
Kumite -75 kg	Yuta Mori; Japan	Milton de Souza Menezes; Brazil	Majed Al Khalifah; Saudi Arabia
Kumite -75 kg	Yuta Mori; Japan	Milton de Souza Menezes; Brazil	Wei Chun Hsu; Chinese Taipei
Kumite -84 kg	Makoto Koike; Japan	Abdulaziz Alhakami; Saudi Arabia	Jin Hyeok Park; South Korea
Kumite -84 kg	Makoto Koike; Japan	Abdulaziz Alhakami; Saudi Arabia	Raef Alturkistani; Saudi Arabia
Kumite 84+ kg	Tareg Hamedi; Saudi Arabia	Tanel Paabo; Estonia	Rak Won Kim; South Korea
Kumite 84+ kg	Tareg Hamedi; Saudi Arabia	Tanel Paabo; Estonia	Daichi Kondo; Japan
Team kata	Japan; Arata Kinjo; Ryo Kiyuna; Takuya Uemura	Japan; Chikashi Hayashida; Kazumasa Moto; Keita Nishihara	Saudi Arabia; Rakan Albadri; Saleem Alsirhani; Mesfer Alasmari
Team kata	Japan; Arata Kinjo; Ryo Kiyuna; Takuya Uemura	Japan; Chikashi Hayashida; Kazumasa Moto; Keita Nishihara	Malaysia; Thomson Hoe; Emmanuel Leong; Chee Wei Lim

=== Women ===
Event	Gold	Silver	Bronze
Individual kata	Saori Okamoto; Japan	Masami Seiwada; Japan	Hikaru Ono; Japan
Individual kata	Saori Okamoto; Japan	Masami Seiwada; Japan	Arisa Gibo; Japan
Kumite -50 kg	Chinatsu Endo; Japan	Lucia Kovacikova; Slovakia	Miki Tatebe; Japan
Kumite -50 kg	Chinatsu Endo; Japan	Lucia Kovacikova; Slovakia	Ami Fukigami; Japan
Kumite -55 kg	Shiori Nakamura; Japan	Shiho Tokai; Japan	Viktoria Semanikova; Slovakia
Kumite -55 kg	Shiori Nakamura; Japan	Shiho Tokai; Japan	Hikaru Furuno; Japan
Kumite -61 kg	Misa Iwato; Japan	Ingrid Suchankova; Slovakia	Ayami Moriguchi; Japan
Kumite -61 kg	Misa Iwato; Japan	Ingrid Suchankova; Slovakia	Rina Okita; Japan
Kumite -68 kg	Maya Suzuki; Japan	Mizuki Kikuchi; Japan	Yuka Ishihara; Japan
Kumite -68 kg	Maya Suzuki; Japan	Mizuki Kikuchi; Japan	Sherilyn Wold; Netherlands
Kumite 68+ kg	Vera Kovaleva; Russia	Laura Palacio Gonzalez; Spain	Lotte Orbaek Andersen; Norway
Kumite 68+ kg	Vera Kovaleva; Russia	Laura Palacio Gonzalez; Spain	Dominika Tatarova; Slovakia
Team kata	Japan; Saori Okamoto; Kasumi Furusawa; Sae Taira	Colombia; Camila Moreno; Diana Muñoz; Natalia Pachon	
