= Karate at the 2020 Summer Olympics – Qualification =

Karate competition

This article details the qualifying phase for karate at the 2020 Summer Olympics (postponed to 2021 due to the COVID-19 pandemic). 80 quota places for the Games are entitled to the karatekas coming from their respective NOCs, based on the results at designated tournaments supervised by World Karate Federation. Each NOC could enter a maximum of eight karatekas (one in each division). Host nation Japan has reserved a spot in each of all 8 events, while four are made available to NOCs through a Tripartite Commission Invitation.

== Qualifying standards ==
The 10 competitors in each event qualify as follows:

- 1 from the host nation, Japan
- 4 from the Olympic Standing ranking of 5 April 2021
- 3 from the Olympics Karate 2020 Qualification Tournament
- 2 from continental representation or Tripartite Commission invitation

Because the World Karate Federation rankings are based on five weight classes instead of the three weight classes featured in the 2020 Olympics, some of the Olympic events are based on a combination of two WKF classes. In those cases, the top 2 from each of the WKF classes qualify for the combined Olympic class (for a total of 4). Where the Olympic class matches the WKF class, the top 4 in that class qualify.

The qualification tournament features the same weight classes as the Olympic weight classes. Only NOCs that have not qualified through Olympic standing for a given division are eligible to enter an athlete in the qualification tournament. The top three finishers in each division at the qualification tournament qualify for the Olympics.

A total of 12 quota places, distributed among the eight events, are available through continental representation. The selection order is as follows:

- Oceania, 2 spots (1 per gender)
- Africa, 2 spots (1 per gender)
- Americas, 2 spots (1 per gender)
- Asia, 2 spots (1 per gender)
- Europe, 2 spots (1 per gender)
- Africa, 1 spot (either gender)
- Americas, 1 spot (the other gender)

For each continent, all of the gold medalists at the continental games are considered together. The highest-ranked among this group earns the qualification spot unless that competitor is already qualified or otherwise cannot be selected without violating any of the following limitations: 10 athletes per division, 1 athlete per NOC per division, 2 athletes per NOC through continental representation (affecting only Africa and the Americas). If the highest-ranked gold medalist cannot be entered, then the next-highest ranked gold medalist qualifies if possible. This process goes through all gold medalists by ranking, then all silver medalists by ranking, then all bronze medalists by ranking until the continent's qualifying spots are filled. If none of the medalists can be entered, the highest-ranked eligible athlete from that continent in the rankings (regardless of finish at the continental games) qualifies.

The final four quota spots will be assigned through Tripartite Commission invitation.

== Timeline ==
Event	Date	Venue
2019 European Games	June 21–30, 2019	(Belarus) Minsk
2019 Pan American Games	July 26 – August 11, 2019	(Peru) Lima
WKF Olympic Standings	May 25, 2021	—
World Olympic Qualification Tournament	June 11–13, 2021	(France) Paris

== Qualification summary ==
NOC	Men				Women				Total
NOC	67 kg	75 kg	+75 kg	Kata	55 kg	61 kg	+61 kg	Kata	Total
Algeria							Yes		1
Australia		Yes							1
Austria					Yes				1
Azerbaijan	Yes	Yes					Yes		3
Bulgaria					Yes				1
Canada			Yes						1
China						Yes	Yes		2
Chinese Taipei				Yes	Yes				2
Croatia			Yes						1
Egypt	Yes	Yes			Yes	Yes	Yes		5
France	Yes					Yes		Yes	3
Georgia			Yes						1
Germany		Yes	Yes	Yes				Yes	4
Hong Kong								Yes	1
Hungary		Yes							1
Iran			Yes		Yes		Yes		3
Italy	Yes	Yes		Yes			Yes	Yes	5
Japan	Yes	Yes	Yes	Yes	Yes	Yes	Yes	Yes	8
Jordan	Yes								1
Kazakhstan	Yes	Yes	Yes		Yes		Yes		5
Kuwait				Yes					1
Latvia	Yes								1
Morocco						Yes			1
New Zealand								Yes	1
North Macedonia								Yes	1
Peru						Yes			1
Refugee Olympic Team	Yes			Yes					2
ROC					Yes				1
Saudi Arabia			Yes						1
Serbia						Yes			1
South Korea				Yes					1
Spain				Yes				Yes	2
Switzerland							Yes		1
Turkey	Yes		Yes	Yes	Yes	Yes	Yes	Yes	7
Ukraine		Yes			Yes	Yes			3
United States		Yes	Yes	Yes				Yes	4
Venezuela	Yes			Yes		Yes			3
Total: 37 NOCs	11	10	10	11	10	10	10	10	82

== Men's events ==
=== 67 kg ===
Competition	Places	Qualified athletes
Host Country	1	Naoto Sago (JPN)
WKF Olympic Standings (60 kg) (as of May 2021)	2	Darkhan Assadilov (KAZ); Angelo Crescenzo (ITA)
WKF Olympic Standings (67 kg) (as of May 2021)	2	Steven Da Costa (FRA); Ali El-Sawy (EGY)
World Qualification Tournament	3	Eray Şamdan (TUR); Abdelrahman Al-Masatfa (JOR); Firdovsi Farzaliyev (AZE)
Continental Representation	2	Kalvis Kalniņš (LAT); Andrés Madera (VEN)
Tripartite Commission Invitation	0	—
IOC Invitation	1	Hamoon Derafshipour (EOR)
Total	11	

=== 75 kg ===
Competition	Places	Qualified athletes
Host Country	1	Ken Nishimura (JPN)
WKF Olympic Standings (as of May 2021)	4	Luigi Busà (ITA); Rafael Aghayev (AZE); Stanislav Horuna (UKR); Tom Scott (USA)
World Qualification Tournament	3	Nurkanat Azhikanov (KAZ); Noah Bitsch (GER); Gábor Hárspataki (HUN)
Continental Representation	2	Tsuneari Yahiro (AUS); Abdalla Abdelaziz (EGY)
Tripartite Commission Invitation	0	—
Total	10	

=== +75 kg ===
Competition	Places	Qualified athletes
Host Country	1	Ryutaro Araga (JPN)
WKF Olympic Standings (84 kg) (as of May 2021)	2	Uğur Aktaş (TUR); Ivan Kvesić (CRO)
WKF Olympic Standings (+84 kg) (as of May 2021)	2	Sajjad Ganjzadeh (IRI); Jonathan Horne (GER)
World Qualification Tournament	3	Tareg Hamedi (KSA); Gogita Arkania (GEO); Daniel Gaysinsky (CAN)
Continental Representation	2	Brian Irr (USA); Daniyar Yuldashev (KAZ)
Tripartite Commission Invitation	0	—
Total	10	

=== Kata ===
Competition	Places	Qualified athletes
Host Country	1	Ryo Kiyuna (JPN)
WKF Olympic Standings (as of May 2021)	4	Damián Quintero (ESP); Ali Sofuoğlu (TUR); Antonio Díaz (VEN); Mattia Busato (ITA)
World Qualification Tournament	3	Ariel Torres (USA); Wang Yi-ta (TPE); Park Hee-jun (KOR)
Continental Representation	0	—
Tripartite Commission Invitation	1	Mohammad Al-Mosawi (KUW)
Re-allocation of unused quota	1	Ilja Smorguner (GER)
IOC Invitation	1	Wael Shueb (EOR)
Total	11	

== Women's events ==
=== 55 kg ===
Competition	Places	Qualified athletes
Host Country	1	Miho Miyahara (JPN)
WKF Olympic Standings (50 kg) (as of May 2021)	2	Serap Özçelik (TUR); Sara Bahmanyar (IRI)
WKF Olympic Standings (55 kg) (as of May 2021)	2	Anzhelika Terliuga (UKR); Wen Tzu-yun (TPE)
World Qualification Tournament	3	Ivet Goranova (BUL); Moldir Zhangbyrbay (KAZ); Anna Chernysheva (ROC)
Continental Representation	2	Radwa Sayed (EGY); Bettina Plank (AUT)
Tripartite Commission Invitation	0	—
Total	10	

=== 61 kg ===
Competition	Places	Qualified athletes
Host Country	1	Mayumi Someya (JPN)
WKF Olympic Standings (as of May 2021)	4	Yin Xiaoyan (CHN); Giana Farouk (EGY); Jovana Preković (SRB); Merve Çoban (TUR)
World Qualification Tournament	3	Btissam Sadini (MAR); Anita Serogina (UKR); Claudymar Garcés (VEN)
Continental Representation	1	Alexandra Grande (PER)
Tripartite Commission Invitation	0	—
Re-allocation of unused quota	1	Leïla Heurtault (FRA)
Total	10	

=== +61 kg ===
Competition	Places	Qualified athletes
Host Country	1	Ayumi Uekusa (JPN)
WKF Olympic Standings (68 kg) (as of May 2021)	2	Irina Zaretska (AZE); Gong Li (CHN)
WKF Olympic Standings (+68 kg) (as of May 2021)	2	Hamideh Abbasali (IRI); Meltem Hocaoğlu (TUR)
World Qualification Tournament	3	Elena Quirici (SUI); Silvia Semeraro (ITA); Feryal Abdelaziz (EGY)
Continental Representation	2	Sofya Berultseva (KAZ); Lamya Matoub (ALG)
Tripartite Commission Invitation	0	—
Total	10	

=== Kata ===
Competition	Places	Qualified athletes
Host Country	1	Kiyou Shimizu (JPN)
WKF Olympic Standings (as of May 2021)	4	Sandra Sánchez (ESP); Viviana Bottaro (ITA); Grace Lau (HKG); Sakura Kokumai (USA)
World Qualification Tournament	3	Dilara Bozan (TUR); Alexandra Feracci (FRA); Jasmin Jüttner (GER)
Continental Representation	1	Alexandrea Anacan (NZL)
Tripartite Commission Invitation	1	Puleksenija Jovanoska (MKD)
Total	10	
