= Turkey at the 2020 Summer Olympics =

- IOC code: TUR
- NOC: Turkish Olympic Committee
- Website: olimpiyat.org.tr (in English and Turkish)

in Tokyo, Japan 23 July 2021 – 8 August 2021
- Competitors: 108 in 18 sports
- Flag bearers (opening): Merve Tuncel; Berke Saka
- Flag bearer (closing): Busenaz Sürmeneli
- Medals Ranked 35th: Gold 2 Silver 2 Bronze 9 Total 13

Summer Olympics appearances (overview)
- 1908; 1912; 1920; 1924; 1928; 1932; 1936; 1948; 1952; 1956; 1960; 1964; 1968; 1972; 1976; 1980; 1984; 1988; 1992; 1996; 2000; 2004; 2008; 2012; 2016; 2020; 2024

Other related appearances
- 1906 Intercalated Games

Turkey competed at the 2020 Summer Olympics in Tokyo. Originally scheduled to take place from 24 July to 9 August 2020, the Games were postponed to 23 July to 8 August 2021, due to the COVID-19 pandemic. Since the nation's official debut in 1908, Turkish athletes have appeared in every edition of the Summer Olympic Games, except the 1920 Summer Olympics in Antwerp, the 1932 Summer Olympics in Los Angeles during the worldwide Great Depression, and the 1980 Summer Olympics in Moscow because of its support for the United States-led boycott.

Turkey surpassed its previous most successful Olympic medal count, which had come during its appearance at the 2016 Summer Olympics. Its 13 medals at the 2020 Games included two gold, two silvers and nine bronze medals.

== Medalists ==
Medal	Name	Sport	Event	Date
Gold	Mete Gazoz	Archery	Men's individual	31 July
Gold	Busenaz Sürmeneli	Boxing	Women's welterweight	7 August
Silver	Eray Şamdan	Karate	Men's 67 kg	5 August
Silver	Buse Naz Çakıroğlu	Boxing	Women's flyweight	7 August
Bronze	Hakan Reçber	Taekwondo	Men's 68 kg	25 July
Bronze	Hatice Kübra İlgün	Taekwondo	Women's 57 kg	25 July
Bronze	Rıza Kayaalp	Wrestling	Men's Greco-Roman 130 kg	2 August
Bronze	Yasemin Adar	Wrestling	Women's freestyle 76 kg	2 August
Bronze	Ferhat Arıcan	Gymnastics	Men's parallel bars	3 August
Bronze	Taha Akgül	Wrestling	Men's freestyle 125 kg	6 August
Bronze	Ali Sofuoğlu	Karate	Men's kata	6 August
Bronze	Merve Çoban	Karate	Women's 61 kg	6 August
Bronze	Uğur Aktaş	Karate	Men's +75 kg	7 August

Medals by sport
Sport	1st place, gold medalist(s)	2nd place, silver medalist(s)	3rd place, bronze medalist(s)	Total
Archery	1	0	0	1
Boxing	1	1	0	2
Gymnastics	0	0	1	1
Karate	0	1	3	4
Taekwondo	0	0	2	2
Wrestling	0	0	3	3
Total	2	2	9	13

== Competitors ==
The following is the list of number of competitors participating in the Games:

Sport	Men	Women	Total
Archery	1	1	2
Athletics	17	8	25
Badminton	0	1	1
Boxing	3	3	6
Cycling	2	0	2
Fencing	0	1	1
Gymnastics	4	1	5
Judo	4	2	6
Karate	3	4	7
Modern pentathlon	0	1	1
Rowing	1	0	1
Sailing	4	4	8
Shooting	4	0	4
Swimming	6	5	11
Taekwondo	1	4	5
Volleyball	0	12	12
Weightlifting	1	1	2
Wrestling	7	2	9
Total	58	50	108

== Archery ==
Two Turkish archers booked Olympic places in the men's individual recurve and the women's individual recurve by finishing in the top 4 of the Europe Continental Qualification Tournament in Antalya, Turkey, thereby also qualifying for the Mixed Team Event.

Athlete	Event	Ranking round		Round of 64	Round of 32	Round of 16	Quarterfinals	Semifinals	Final / BM	
Athlete	Event	Score	Seed	Opposition Score	Opposition Score	Opposition Score	Opposition Score	Opposition Score	Opposition Score	Rank
Mete Gazoz	Men's individual	669	10	Henckels (LUX); W 6–0	Tyack (AUS); W 7–3	Worth (AUS); W 7–1	Ellison (USA); W 7–3	Furukawa (JPN); W 7–3	Nespoli (ITA); W 6–4	1st place, gold medalist(s)
Yasemin Anagöz	Women's individual	652	19	Barrett (CAN); W 6–2	Yang (CHN); W 6–2	Kang C-y (KOR); L 2–6	Did not advance			
Mete Gazoz; Yasemin Anagöz	Mixed team	1321	7 Q	—N/a		ROC; W 6–2	Indonesia; W 6–2	Netherlands; L 3–5	Mexico; L 2–6	4

== Athletics ==
Turkish athletes further achieved the entry standards, either by qualifying time or by world ranking, in the following track and field events (up to a maximum of 3 athletes in each event):

Key

- Note–Ranks given for track events are within the athlete's heat only
- Q = Qualified for the next round
- q = Qualified for the next round as a fastest loser or, in field events, by position without achieving the qualifying target
- NR = National record
- N/A = Round not applicable for the event
- Bye = Athlete not required to compete in round

Track & road events
Men

Athlete	Event	Heat		Quarterfinal		Semifinal		Final	
Athlete	Event	Result	Rank	Result	Rank	Result	Rank	Result	Rank
Jak Ali Harvey	100 m	Bye		10.25	6	Did not advance			
Emre Zafer Barnes	100 m	Bye		10.47	7	Did not advance			
Ramil Guliyev	200 m	20.54	2 Q	—N/a		20.31	6	Did not advance	
Yasmani Copello	400 m hurdles	49.00	2 Q	—N/a		47.88	3 q	47.81 NR	6
Ramil Guliyev; Jak Ali Harvey; Kayhan Özer; Ertan Özkan	4 × 100 m relay	DSQ		—N/a				Did not advance	
Yavuz Ağralı	Marathon	—N/a						2:21:00	52
Polat Kemboi Arıkan	Marathon	—N/a						DNF	
Abdulselam İmük	20 km walk	—N/a						1:32:27	48
Salih Korkmaz	20 km walk	—N/a						DNF	
Şahin Şenoduncu	20 km walk	—N/a						1:27:39	34

Women

Athlete	Event	Heat		Final	
Athlete	Event	Result	Rank	Result	Rank
Yasemin Can	5000 m	14:50.92	6 q	14:46.49	8
Yasemin Can	10000 m	—N/a		31:10.05	11
Meryem Erdoğan	Marathon	—N/a		DNF	
Meryem Bekmez	20 km walk	—N/a		1:35:08	22
Evin Demir	20 km walk	—N/a		1:39:55	41
Ayşe Tekdal	20 km walk	—N/a		1:38:40	39

Field events

Athlete	Event	Qualification		Final	
Athlete	Event	Distance	Position	Distance	Position
Necati Er	Men's triple jump	17.13	2 Q	17.25	6
Ersu Şaşma	Men's pole vault	5.65	12 q	5.70	10
Eşref Apak	Men's hammer throw	76.76	8 q	76.71	9
Özkan Baltacı	Men's hammer throw	63.63	31	Did not advance	
Emel Dereli	Women's shot put	17.81	16	Did not advance	
Eda Tuğsuz	Women's javelin throw	62.31	5 q	64.00	4
Tuğçe Şahutoğlu	Women's hammer throw	66.06	27	Did not advance	

== Badminton ==
Turkey entered one female player into the Olympic tournament based on the BWF Race to Tokyo Rankings.

Athlete	Event	Group stage			Elimination	Quarterfinal	Semifinal	Final / BM	
Athlete	Event	Opposition Score	Opposition Score	Rank	Opposition Score	Opposition Score	Opposition Score	Opposition Score	Rank
Neslihan Yiğit	Women's singles	Hany (EGY); W (21–5, 21–5)	Chen Yf (CHN); L (14–21, 9–21)	2	Did not advance				

== Boxing ==
Turkey entered one male boxer into the Olympic tournament. Batuhan Çiftçi scored a round-of-16 victory to secure a spot in the men's flyweight division at the 2020 European Qualification Tournament in London, United Kingdom. At the same tournament, Buse Naz Çakıroğlu scored a quarterfinal victory to secure a spot in the women's flyweight division.

Athlete	Event	Round of 32	Round of 16	Quarterfinals	Semifinals	Final	
Athlete	Event	Opposition Result	Opposition Result	Opposition Result	Opposition Result	Opposition Result	Rank
Batuhan Çiftçi	Men's flyweight	Zoirov (UZB); L 0–5	Did not advance				
Necat Ekinci	Men's welterweight	Radzionau (BLR); L 2–3	Did not advance				
Bayram Malkan	Men's light heavyweight	Bye	Samed (GHA); W RSC	Alfonso (AZE); L 0–5	Did not advance		
Buse Naz Çakıroğlu	Women's flyweight	Bye	Rakhimova (UZB); W 3–2	Jitpong (THA); W 5–0	Huang H-w (TPE); W 5–0	Krasteva (BUL); L 0–5	2nd place, silver medalist(s)
Esra Yıldız	Women's lightweight	Bye	Sánchez (ARG); W 5–0	Potkonen (FIN); L 2-3	Did not advance		
Busenaz Sürmeneli	Women's welterweight	Bye	Koszewska (POL); W 5–0	Lysenko (UKR); W 5–0	Borgohain (IND); W 5–0	Gu H (CHN); W 3–0	1st place, gold medalist(s)

== Cycling ==
=== Road ===
Turkey entered two riders to compete in the men's Olympic road race, by virtue of their top 50 national finish (for men) in the UCI World Ranking.

Athlete	Event	Time	Rank
Onur Balkan	Men's road race	Did not finish	
Ahmet Örken	Men's road race	Did not finish	

== Fencing ==
Turkey entered one fencer into the Olympic competition. Rio 2016 Olympian İrem Karamete claimed a spot in the women's foil as one of the two highest-ranked fencers vying for qualification from Europe in the FIE Adjusted Official Rankings.

Athlete	Event	Round of 64	Round of 32	Round of 16	Quarterfinal	Semifinal	Final / BM	
Athlete	Event	Opposition Score	Opposition Score	Opposition Score	Opposition Score	Opposition Score	Opposition Score	Rank
İrem Karamete	Women's foil	Bye	Ross (USA); L 5–15	Did not advance				

== Gymnastics ==
=== Artistic ===
Turkey entered three artistic gymnasts into the Olympic competition. Rio 2016 Olympian Ferhat Arıcan and rookie Nazlı Savranbaşı finished among the top twelve eligible for qualification in the men's and among the top twenty in the women's individual all-around and apparatus events, respectively, to book their spots on the Turkish roster at the 2019 World Championships in Stuttgart, Germany. Meanwhile, Ahmet Önder and İbrahim Çolak secured spots available for individual-based gymnasts, neither part of the team nor qualified through the all-around, in the parallel bars and rings exercises, respectively, at the same tournament.

Men

Athlete	Event	Qualification								Final							
Athlete	Event	Apparatus						Total	Rank	Apparatus						Total	Rank
Athlete	Event	F	PH	R	V	PB	HB	Total	Rank	F	PH	R	V	PB	HB	Total	Rank
Ferhat Arıcan	Parallel bars	—N/a	14.233	—N/a		15.566	—N/a		4 Q	—N/a				15.633	—N/a		3rd place, bronze medalist(s)
Adem Asil	All-around	14.033	12.400	14.800	14.766	14.091	14.100	84.524	15 Q	14.300	13.166	13.700	15.133	12.600	13.600	82.499	15
Adem Asil	Rings	—N/a		14.800	—N/a			14.800	6 Q	—N/a		14.600	—N/a				7
Adem Asil	Vault	—N/a			14.766	—N/a			4 Q	—N/a			14.449	—N/a			6
İbrahim Çolak	Rings	—N/a		14.933	—N/a				4 Q	—N/a		14.866	—N/a				5
Ahmet Önder	All-around	14.600	13.333	14.366	14.333	15.200	13.833	85.665	8 Q	—	12.900	13.866	14.333	—	41.099	DNF	
Ahmet Önder	Vault	—N/a			14.466	—N/a		14.466	8 Q	—N/a			14.066	—N/a			7

Women

Athlete	Event	Qualification						Final					
Athlete	Event	Apparatus				Total	Rank	Apparatus				Total	Rank
Athlete	Event	V	UB	BB	F	Total	Rank	V	UB	BB	F	Total	Rank
Nazlı Savranbaşı	All-around	12.900	11.933	11.033	11.933	47.799	71	Did not advance					

== Judo ==
Turkey entered five judoka (four men and one woman) into the Olympic tournament based on the International Judo Federation Olympics Individual Ranking.

Athlete	Event	Round of 64	Round of 32	Round of 16	Quarterfinals	Semifinals	Repechage	Final / BM	
Athlete	Event	Opposition Result	Opposition Result	Opposition Result	Opposition Result	Opposition Result	Opposition Result	Opposition Result	Rank
Mihraç Akkuş	Men's −60 kg	—N/a	Namgyel (BHU); W 01–00	Smetov (KAZ); L 00–01	Did not advance				
Bilal Çiloğlu	Men's −73 kg	Bye	Slman (JOR); W 01–00	Ono (JPN); L 00–01	Did not advance				
Vedat Albayrak	Men's −81 kg	Bye	Nagase (JPN); L 00–01	Did not advance					
Mihael Žgank	Men's −90 kg	Bye	Silva (CUB); W 01–00	Brown (USA); W 01–00	van 't End (NED); W 01–00	Trippel (GER); L 00–01	Bye	Bobonov (UZB); L 00–01	5
Gülkader Şentürk	Women's –48 kg	—N/a	Figueroa (ESP); L 00–01	Did not advance					
Kayra Sayit	Women's +78 kg	—N/a	Atangana (CMR); W 01–00	Kalanina (UKR); W 01–00	Sone (JPN); L 00–01	Did not advance	Han M-j (KOR); W 01–00	Dicko (FRA); L 00–01	5

== Karate ==
Turkey entered seven karateka into the inaugural Olympic tournament. 2019 European Games medalists Uğur Aktaş (men's +75 kg), Ali Sofuoğlu (men's kata), Serap Özçelik (women's 55 kg), Merve Çoban (women's 61 kg), and Meltem Hocaoğlu (women's +61 kg) qualified directly for their respective kumite and kata categories by finishing among the top four karateka at the end of the combined WKF Olympic Rankings.

Kumite

Athlete	Event	Group stage					Semifinals	Final	
Athlete	Event	Opposition Result	Opposition Result	Opposition Result	Opposition Result	Rank	Opposition Result	Opposition Result	Rank
Eray Şamdan	Men's –67 kg	Farzaliyev (AZE); W 7–1	Assadilov (KAZ); L 2–6	El-Sawy (EGY); W 4–1	Sago (JPN); W 2–1	2 Q	Al-Masatfa (JOR); W 2–0	Da Costa (FRA); L 0–5	2nd place, silver medalist(s)
Uğur Aktaş	Men's +75 kg	Arkania (GEO); W 3–1	Araga (JPN); L 3–5	Yuldashev (KAZ); W 11–3	Horne (GER); W WO	2 q	Ganjzadeh (IRI); L 2–2	Did not advance	3rd place, bronze medalist(s)
Serap Özçelik	Women's −55 kg	Bahmanyar (IRI); L 4–5	Goranova (BUL); L 1–5	Wen (TPE); L 4–5	—N/a	4	Did not advance		
Merve Çoban	Women's −61 kg	Someya (JPN); W 4–0	Garcés (VEN); W 6–2	Heurtault (FRA); L 0–2	Yin X-y (CHN); L 2–2^{+}	2 Q	Preković (SRB); L 0–2	Did not advance	3rd place, bronze medalist(s)
Meltem Hocaoğlu	Women's +61 kg	Berultseva (KAZ); D 5–5	Uekusa (JPN); L 4–5	Semeraro (ITA); L 4–9	Zaretska (AZE); L 0–4	5	Did not advance		

Kata

Athlete	Event	Elimination round		Ranking round		Final / BM	
Athlete	Event	Score	Rank	Score	Rank	Opposition Result	Rank
Ali Sofuoğlu	Men's kata	27.28	2 Q	27.32	2 Q	Park H-j (KOR); W 27.26–26.14	3rd place, bronze medalist(s)
Dilara Bozan	Women's kata	24.76	3 Q	25.78	3 q	Lau (HKG); L 26.52–26.94	4

== Modern pentathlon ==
Turkey athletes qualified for the following spots to compete in modern pentathlon. İlke Özyüksel confirmed places each in the women's event, after booked the sixth of eight available spots at world ranking.

Athlete	Event	Fencing (épée one touch)				Swimming (200 m freestyle)			Riding (show jumping)			Combined: shooting/running (10 m air pistol)/(3200 m)			Total points	Final rank
Athlete	Event	RR	BR	Rank	MP points	Time	Rank	MP points	Penalties	Rank	MP points	Time	Rank	MP points	Total points	Final rank
İlke Özyüksel	Women's	184	1	27	185	2:15.89	20	279	7	5	293	11:47.64	3	593	1350	5

== Rowing ==
Turkey qualified one boat in the men's single sculls for the Games by finishing sixth in the A-final and securing the second of three berths available at the 2021 FISA European Olympic Qualification Regatta in Varese, Italy.

Athlete	Event	Heats		Repechage		Quarterfinals		Semifinals		Final	
Athlete	Event	Time	Rank	Time	Rank	Time	Rank	Time	Rank	Time	Rank
Onat Kazaklı	Men's single sculls	7:20.11	3 QF	Bye		7:32.86	4 SC/D	7:32.19	6 FD	7:13.65	21

Qualification Legend: FA=Final A (medal); FB=Final B (non-medal); FC=Final C (non-medal); FD=Final D (non-medal); FE=Final E (non-medal); FF=Final F (non-medal); SA/B=Semifinals A/B; SC/D=Semifinals C/D; SE/F=Semifinals E/F; QF=Quarterfinals; R=Repechage

== Sailing ==
Turkish sailors qualified one boat in each of the following classes through the 2018 Sailing World Championships, the class-associated Worlds, and the continental regattas.

Two-time Olympian Alican Kaynar (Finn), 470 crew brothers Deniz and Ateş Çınar, and Rio 2016 windsurfer Dilara Uralp were selected to the Turkish roster under the qualifying merit, while rookie Ecem Güzel beat her rival Nazlı Çağla Dönertaş to top the country's Laser Radial spot with a tenth place overall at the 2019 World Championships in Sakaiminato.

Men

Athlete	Event	Race													Net points	Final rank
Athlete	Event	1	2	3	4	5	6	7	8	9	10	11	12	M*	Net points	Final rank
Onur Cavit Biriz	RS:X	15	19	20	19	~~26~~	14	23	20	23	21	21	17	EL	210	20
Alican Kaynar	Finn	1	1	6	13	9	14	7	~~20~~	10	10	—N/a		5	81	8
Ateş Çınar; Deniz Çınar	470	11	14	5	3	2	10	~~17~~	13	11	4	—N/a		10	93	10

Women

Athlete	Event	Race													Net points	Final rank
Athlete	Event	1	2	3	4	5	6	7	8	9	10	11	12	M*	Net points	Final rank
Dilara Uralp	RS:X	16	22	23	23	24	~~25~~	22	24	21	21	25	24	EL	245	24
Ecem Güzel	Laser Radial	4	24	12	17	28	~~30~~	11	29	27	20	—N/a		EL	172	20
Okyanus Arıkan; Beste Kaynakçı	470	20	DPI	~~BFD~~	18	12	14	13	18	3	14	—N/a		EL	127.1	17

M = Medal race; EL = Eliminated – did not advance into the medal race

== Shooting ==
Turkish shooters achieved quota places for the following events by virtue of their best finishes at the 2018 ISSF World Championships, the 2019 ISSF World Cup series, European Championships or Games, and European Qualifying Tournament, as long as they obtained a minimum qualifying score (MQS) by May 31, 2020.

Athlete	Event	Qualification		Final	
Athlete	Event	Points	Rank	Points	Rank
Ömer Akgün	Men's 10 m air rifle	629.8	5 Q	207.3	4
Ömer Akgün	Men's 50 metre rifle three positions	1147	36	Did not advance	
Yusuf Dikeç	Men's 10 m air pistol	572	24	Did not advance	
İsmail Keleş	Men's 10 m air pistol	572	25	Did not advance	
Özgür Varlık	Men's 25 m rapid fire pistol	555	24	Did not advance	

== Swimming ==
Turkish swimmers further achieved qualifying standards in the following events (up to a maximum of 2 swimmers in each event at the Olympic Qualifying Time (OQT), and potentially 1 at the Olympic Selection Time (OST)):

Men

Athlete	Event	Heat		Semifinal		Final	
Athlete	Event	Time	Rank	Time	Rank	Time	Rank
Yiğit Aslan	800 m freestyle	7:56.18	24	—N/a		Did not advance	
Ümitcan Güreş	100 m butterfly	52.44	=35	Did not advance			
Berkay Ömer Öğretir	100 m breaststroke	59.82	18	Did not advance			
Berkay Ömer Öğretir	200 m breaststroke	2:10.73	22	Did not advance			
Berke Saka	200 m backstroke	1:58.66	23	Did not advance			
Hüseyin Emre Sakçı	100 m breaststroke	59.87	19	Did not advance			
Baturalp Ünlü	200 m freestyle	1:49.75	34	Did not advance			

Women

Athlete	Event	Heat		Semifinal		Final	
Athlete	Event	Time	Rank	Time	Rank	Time	Rank
Beril Böcekler	400 m freestyle	4:08.27	16	—N/a		Did not advance	
Deniz Ertan	800 m freestyle	8:36.29	23	—N/a		Did not advance	
Deniz Ertan	1500 m freestyle	16:13.22	17	—N/a		Did not advance	
Viktoriya Zeynep Güneş	200 m individual medley	2:14.41	22	Did not advance			
Defne Taçyıldız	200 m butterfly	2:10.00	12 Q	2:11.27	14	Did not advance	
Merve Tuncel	400 m freestyle	4:11.06	19	—N/a		Did not advance	
Merve Tuncel	800 m freestyle	8:25.62	12	—N/a		Did not advance	
Merve Tuncel	1500 m freestyle	16:00.51	11	—N/a		Did not advance	
Beril Böcekler; Deniz Ertan; Viktoriya Zeynep Güneş; Merve Tuncel	4 × 200 m freestyle relay	8:10.96	13	—N/a		Did not advance	

== Taekwondo ==
Turkey entered five athletes into the taekwondo competition at the Games. Rukiye Yıldırım (women's 49 kg), Hatice Kübra İlgün (women's 57 kg), double Olympic medalist Nur Tatar (women's 67 kg), and Nafia Kuş (women's +67 kg) qualified directly for their respective weight classes by finishing among the top five taekwondo practitioners at the end of the WT Olympic Rankings. Meanwhile, Hakan Reçber scored a semifinal victory in the men's lightweight category (68 kg) to book the remaining spot on the Turkish taekwondo squad at the 2021 European Qualification Tournament in Sofia, Bulgaria.

Athlete	Event	Qualification	Round of 16	Quarterfinals	Semifinals	Repechage	Final / BM	
Athlete	Event	Opposition Result	Opposition Result	Opposition Result	Opposition Result	Opposition Result	Opposition Result	Rank
Hakan Reçber	Men's −68 kg	Bye	Pontes (BRA); W 25–15	Sinden (GBR); L 19–39 PTG	Did not advance	Burns (NZL); W 23–8	Husić (BIH); W 22–13	3rd place, bronze medalist(s)
Rukiye Yıldırım	Women's −49 kg	Bye	Abdelsalam (EGY); W 21–20	Ramírez (COL); W 31–30	Cerezo (ESP); L 19–39 PTG	Bye	Semberg (ISR); L 22–27	5
Hatice Kübra İlgün	Women's −57 kg	Bye	Lindo (CRC); W 16–5	Zolotic (USA); L 9–17	Did not advance	Laaraj (MAR); W 6–0	Alizadeh (EOR); W 8–6	3rd place, bronze medalist(s)
Nur Tatar	Women's −67 kg	—N/a	Anyanacho (NGR); W 12–7	McPherson (USA); L 1–3	Did not advance			
Nafia Kuş	Women's +67 kg	—N/a	Rodríguez (DOM); L 5–7	Did not advance				

== Volleyball ==
=== Indoor ===
Summary

Team	Event	Group Stage						Quarterfinal	Semifinal	Final / BM	
Team	Event	Opposition Score	Opposition Score	Opposition Score	Opposition Score	Opposition Score	Rank	Opposition Score	Opposition Score	Opposition Score	Rank
Turkey women's	Women's tournament	China; W 3–0	Italy; L 1–3	United States; L 2–3	Argentina; W 3–0	ROC; W 3–2	3 Q	South Korea; L 2–3	Did not advance		

==== Women's tournament ====
Turkey women's volleyball team qualified for the Olympics by winning the final match and securing an outright berth at the European Olympic Qualification Tournament in Apeldoorn, Netherlands, marking the country's recurrence to the sport after an eight-year absence.

Team roster

The Turkey roster was announced on 7 July 2021.

Head coach: (Italy) Giovanni Guidetti

- 2 Simge Aköz L
- 3 Cansu Özbay S
- 4 Tuğba Şenoğlu OS
- 5 Şeyma Ercan OS
- 6 Kübra Akman MB
- 7 Hande Baladın OS
- 9 Meliha İsmailoğlu OS
- 11 Naz Aydemir S
- 13 Meryem Boz OP
- 14 Eda Erdem Dündar (c) MB
- 18 Zehra Güneş MB
- 99 Ebrar Karakurt OP

Group play

Pos	Team	Pld	W	L	Pts	SW	SL	SR	SPW	SPL	SPR	Qualification
1	United States	5	4	1	10	12	7	1.714	418	401	1.042	Quarter-finals
2	Italy	5	3	2	10	11	7	1.571	409	377	1.085	Quarter-finals
3	Turkey	5	3	2	9	12	8	1.500	434	416	1.043	Quarter-finals
4	ROC	5	3	2	9	11	8	1.375	422	378	1.116	Quarter-finals
5	China	5	2	3	7	8	9	0.889	374	385	0.971	
6	Argentina	5	0	5	0	0	15	0.000	275	375	0.733	

Source: Tokyo 2020 and FIVB
Rules for classification: Tiebreakers

25 July 2021; 16:25	China	0–3	Turkey	Ariake Arena, Tokyo; Referees: Susana Rodríguez (ESP), Luis Macias (MEX)
25 July 2021; 16:25	(21–25, 14–25, 14–25); Results Statistics			Ariake Arena, Tokyo; Referees: Susana Rodríguez (ESP), Luis Macias (MEX)

27 July 2021; 16:25	Italy	3–1	Turkey	Ariake Arena, Tokyo; Referees: Denny Cespedes (DOM), Hernán Casamiquela (ARG)
27 July 2021; 16:25	(25–22, 23–25, 25–20, 25–15); Results Statistics			Ariake Arena, Tokyo; Referees: Denny Cespedes (DOM), Hernán Casamiquela (ARG)

29 July 2021; 21:45	United States	3–2	Turkey	Ariake Arena, Tokyo; Referees: Paulo Turci (BRA), Kang Joo-hee (KOR)
29 July 2021; 21:45	(25–19, 25–20, 17–25, 20–25, 15–12); ResultsStatistics			Ariake Arena, Tokyo; Referees: Paulo Turci (BRA), Kang Joo-hee (KOR)

31 July 2021; 14:20	Argentina	0–3	Turkey	Ariake Arena, Tokyo; Referees: Sumie Myoi (JPN), Hamid Al-Rousi (UAE)
31 July 2021; 14:20	(23–25, 20–25, 18–25); Results Statistics			Ariake Arena, Tokyo; Referees: Sumie Myoi (JPN), Hamid Al-Rousi (UAE)

2 August 2021; 14:20	ROC	2–3	Turkey	Ariake Arena, Tokyo; Referees: Fabrice Collados (FRA), Susana Rodríguez (ESP)
2 August 2021; 14:20	(25–21, 23–25, 23–25, 25–15, 10–15); Results Statistics			Ariake Arena, Tokyo; Referees: Fabrice Collados (FRA), Susana Rodríguez (ESP)

Quarter-final

4 August 2021; 09:00	South Korea	3–2	Turkey	Ariake Arena, Tokyo; Referees: Hamid Al-Rousi (UAE), Patricia Rolf (USA)
4 August 2021; 09:00	(17–25, 25–17, 28–26, 18–25, 15–13); Results Statistics			Ariake Arena, Tokyo; Referees: Hamid Al-Rousi (UAE), Patricia Rolf (USA)

== Weightlifting ==
Turkish weightlifters qualified for three quota places at the games, based on the Tokyo 2020 Rankings Qualification List of 11 June 2021.

Athlete	Event	Snatch		Clean & Jerk		Total	Rank
Athlete	Event	Result	Rank	Result	Rank	Total	Rank
Muhammed Furkan Özbek	Men's −67 kg	142	6	~~173~~	DNF	142	DNF
Nuray Levent	Women's −64 kg	100	7	120	9	220	9

== Wrestling ==
Turkey qualified nine wrestlers for each of the following classes into the Olympic competition. Four of them finished among the top six to book Olympic spots in the men's freestyle (57 and 125 kg) and men's Greco-Roman (97 and 130 kg) wrestling at the 2019 World Championships, while four additional licenses were awarded to the Turkish wrestlers, who progressed to the top two finals of their respective weight categories at the 2021 European Olympic Qualification Tournament in Budapest, Hungary. Another Turkish wrestler claimed one of the remaining slots in the women's freestyle 76 kg to complete the nation's roster at the 2021 World Qualification Tournament in Sofia, Bulgaria.

Men's freestyle

Athlete	Event	Round of 16	Quarterfinal	Semifinal	Repechage	Final / BM	
Athlete	Event	Opposition Result	Opposition Result	Opposition Result	Opposition Result	Opposition Result	Rank
Süleyman Atlı	Men's 57 kg	Atri (IRI); L 2–3	Did not advance				11
Osman Göçen	Men's 86 kg	Takatani (JPN); W 2–2	Naifonov (ROC); L 1–12	Did not advance			9
Süleyman Karadeniz	Men's 97 kg	Ibragimov (UZB); W 3–3	Yergali (KAZ); W 8–7	Snyder (USA); L 0–5	Bye	Conyedo (ITA); L 2–6	5
Taha Akgül	Men's −125 kg	Dhesi (CAN); W 5–0	Steveson (USA); L 0–8	Did not advance	Lazarev (KGZ); W 4–0	Mönkhtöriin (MGL); W 5–0	3rd place, bronze medalist(s)

Men's Greco-Roman

Athlete	Event	Round of 16	Quarterfinal	Semifinal	Repechage	Final / BM	
Athlete	Event	Opposition Result	Opposition Result	Opposition Result	Opposition Result	Opposition Result	Rank
Kerem Kamal	Men's 60 kg	Ciobanu (MDA); L 0–8	Did not advance				15
Cenk İldem	Men's 97 kg	Milov (BUL); L 1–3	Did not advance				12
Rıza Kayaalp	Men's 130 kg	Knystautas (LTU); W 5–1	Popp (GER); W 6–2	López (CUB); L 0–2	Bye	Mirzazadeh (IRI); W 7–2	3rd place, bronze medalist(s)

Women's freestyle

Athlete	Event	Round of 16	Quarterfinal	Semifinal	Repechage	Final / BM	
Athlete	Event	Opposition Result	Opposition Result	Opposition Result	Opposition Result	Opposition Result	Rank
Evin Demirhan	Women's 50 kg	Hildebrandt (USA); L 0–11	Did not advance				16
Yasemin Adar	Women's −76 kg	Ferreira (BRA); W 6–0	Gray (USA); L 4–6	Did not advance	Sghaier (TUN); W 2–0 ^{F}	Medet Kyzy (KGZ); W 4–0 ^{F}	3rd place, bronze medalist(s)

== See also ==
- Turkey at the 2020 Summer Paralympics
