= Karate at the 2015 European Games – Women's kumite 61 kg =

Karate competition

Women's kumite 61 kg at the 2015 European Games
- Venue: Baku Crystal Hall
- Date: 13 June
- Competitors: 8 from 8 nations

Medalists
gold medal	Lucie Ignace	France
silver medal	Merve Çoban	Turkey
bronze medal	Ana Lenard	Croatia

The women's kumite 61 kg competition at the 2015 European Games in Baku, Azerbaijan was held on 13 June 2015 at the Crystal Hall.

== Schedule ==
All times are Azerbaijan Summer Time (UTC+5).

Date	Time	Event
Saturday, 13 June 2015	10:00	Elimination Round
Saturday, 13 June 2015	15:30	Semifinals
Saturday, 13 June 2015	17:00	Finals

== Results ==
Legend

- KK — Forfeit (Kiken)

=== Elimination round ===
==== Group A ====
Athlete	Pld	W	D	L	Points		
Athlete	Pld	W	D	L	GF	GA	Diff
Lucie Ignace (FRA)	3	2	1	0	5	0	+5
Tjaša Ristić (SLO)	3	1	2	0	8	1	+7
Nele De Vos (BEL)	3	1	0	2	1	9	-8
Irene Colomar (ESP)	3	0	1	2	1	5	-4

	Score	
Lucie Ignace (FRA)	0–0	Tjaša Ristić (SLO)
Irene Colomar (ESP)	0–1	Nele De Vos (BEL)
Lucie Ignace (FRA)	2–0	Nele De Vos (BEL)
Irene Colomar (ESP)	1–1	Tjaša Ristić (SLO)
Tjaša Ristić (SLO)	7–0	Nele De Vos (BEL)
Lucie Ignace (FRA)	3–0	Irene Colomar (ESP)

==== Group B ====
Athlete	Pld	W	D	L	Points		
Athlete	Pld	W	D	L	GF	GA	Diff
Merve Çoban (TUR)	3	2	1	0	4	1	+3
Ana Lenard (CRO)	3	1	2	1	6	0	+6
Ingrida Suchánková (SVK)	3	0	2	1	2	4	-2
Farida Abiyeva (AZE)	3	0	1	2	3	10	-7

	Score	
Ana Lenard (CRO)	0–0	Merve Çoban (TUR)
Ingrida Suchánková (SVK)	2–2	Farida Abiyeva (AZE)
Ana Lenard (CRO)	6–0	Farida Abiyeva (AZE)
Ingrida Suchánková (SVK)	0–2	Merve Çoban (TUR)
Merve Çoban (TUR)	2–1	Farida Abiyeva (AZE)
Ana Lenard (CRO)	0–0	Ingrida Suchánková (SVK)

== Finals ==
Semifinals
Lucie Ignace (FRA)	1
Ana Lenard (CRO)	0
Tjaša Ristić (SLO)	0
Merve Çoban (TUR)	6

Gold medal match
Lucie Ignace (FRA)	1
Merve Çoban (TUR)	1
Bronze medal match
Ana Lenard (CRO)	6
Tjaša Ristić (SLO)	0
