= Puleksenija Jovanoska =

Macedonian karateka

Personal information
- Born: 11 July 1993 (age 33)

Sport
- Country: North Macedonia
- Sport: Karate

Puleksenija Jovanovska (Macedonian: Пулексенија Јовановска, born 11 July 1993) is a Macedonian professional karateka. She represents North Macedonia internationally.

== Career ==
- She is European bronze medalist in European Karate Championships (Continental Championship) and Balkan gold medalist in U-21 Individual Kata category and she also won medals in the World Karate Federation recognised tournaments.
- In 2021 she secured 11th place in the 56th European Karate Championships Karate Championships held at Croatia.

== Achievements ==
She competed at the World Olympic Qualification Tournament held in Paris, France hoping to qualify for 2020 Summer Olympics in Tokyo, Japan She did not qualify at this tournament but she was able to qualify after the allocation of Tripartite Commission Invitation places and the reassignment of the last qualifying spots.

Now she will represent North Macedonia in Women's kata at the Karate competition of the 2020 Summer Olympics in Tokyo, Japan.

Competition Records
YEAR	COMPETITION	VENUE	RANK/POSITION	EVENT
2021	56th European Karate Championships	Porec Croatia	11th	Female Kata
2021	Karate 1 Premier League	Istanbul Turkey	13th	Female Kata
2020	Karate 1 Premier League	Dubai United Arab Emirates	21st	Female Kata
2020	Karate 1 Premier League	Paris France	Participate	Female Kata
2019	Karate 1 Premier League	Madrid Spain	Participate	Female Kata
2019	Karate 1 Premier League	Moscow ROC	23rd	Female Kata
2019	Karate 1 Premier League	Tokyo Japan	Participate	Female Kata
2019	Karate 1 Premier League	Shanghai China	19th	Female Kata
2019	Karate 1 Premier League	Rabat Morocco	Participate	Female Kata
2019	55th European Karate Championships	Guadalajara Spain	5th	Female Kata
2019	Karate 1 Series A	Salzburg Austria	21st	Female Kata
2019	Karate 1 Premier League	Dubai United Arab Emirates	25th	Female Kata
2019	Karate 1 Premier League	Paris France	Participate	Female Kata
2018	Senior World Karate Championship	Madrid Spain	Participate	Female Kata
2018	53rd European Karate Championships	Novi Sad Serbia	Participate	Female Kata
2018	Karate 1 Premier League	Dubai United Arab Emirates	Participate	Female Kata
2018	Karate 1 Premier League	Paris France	Participate	Female Kata
2017	Karate 1 Series A	Istanbul Turkey	Participate	Female Kata
2017	Karate 1 Premier League	Halle/Leipzig Germany	Participate	Female Kata
2017	52nd European Karate Championships	Novi Sad Serbia	7th	Female Kata
2017	Karate 1 Premier League	Rotterdam Netherlands	Participate	Female Kata
2016	Senior World Karate Championship	Linz Austria	Participate	Female Kata
2016	Karate 1 Premier League	Istanbul Turkey	7th	Female Kata
2016	51st European Karate Championships	Paris France	5th	Female Kata
2016	Karate 1 Premier League	Salzburg Austria	Participate	Female Kata
2015	Karate 1 Premier League	Salzburg Austria	Participate	Female Kata
2015	Karate 1 Premier League	Istanbul Turkey	Participate	Female Kata
2015	50th European Karate Championships	Istanbul Turkey	7th	Female Kata
2015	Karate 1 Premier League	Paris France	Participate	Female Kata
2014	Senior World Karate Championship	Bremen Germany	Participate	Female Kata
2014	16th Balkan Senior Karate Championship	Ohrid North Macedonia	Participate	Female Kata
2014	Mediterranean Senior Championships 2014	Podgorica Montenegro	5th	Female Kata
2014	Karate 1 Premier League	Istanbul Turkey	5th	Female Kata
2014	49th European Karate Championships	Tampere Finland	Participate	Female Kata
2014	Karate 1 World Cup	Thermana/Lasko Slovenia	Bronze	Female Kata
2014	41st European Karate Championship for Cadet, Junior and U21 years	Lisbon Portugal	Bronze	Under 21 Kata Female
2013	8th World Junior, Cadet & Under 21 Karate Championships	Guadalajara Spain	Participate	Under 21 Kata Female
2013	48th European Karate Championships	Budapest Hungary	Participate	Female Kata
2013	14th Balkan Cadet & Junior 3rd U21 18th Children Karate Championships	Kragujevac Serbia	Gold	Under 21 Kata Female
2013	40th Cadet, Junior and 5th Under 21 European Karate Championships	Istanbul Turkey	Participate	Under 21 Kata Female
2011	38th Cadet, Junior and 3rd Under 21 European Karate Championships	Novi Das Serbia	Participate	Junior Kata Female
2010	37th Cadet, Junior and 2nd Under 21 European Karate Championships	Izmir Turkey	7th	Junior Kata Female
