= 2018 World Karate Championships – Women's team kumite =

Karate competition

Women's team kumite at the 2018 World Karate Championships
- Location: Madrid, Spain
- Dates: 8-11 November

Medalists
gold medal	Léa Avazeri; Andréa Brito; Leïla Heurtault; Laura Sivert	France
silver medal	Natsumi Kawamura; Ayaka Saito; Mayumi Someya; Ayumi Uekusa	Japan
bronze medal	Aisha Abdelrahman; Shymaa Abou-El-Yazed; Feryal Abdelaziz; Giana Farouk	Egypt
bronze medal	Cristina Ferrer; Laura Palacio; María Torres; Cristina Vizcaíno	Spain

The first round of the Women's team kumite competition at the 2018 World Karate Championships was held on 8 November 2018, the preliminaries and repechages on 9 November and the finals on 11 November 2018.

== Results ==
=== Finals ===
Semi-finals
Japan	2
Spain	0
Egypt	1
France	2

Final
Japan	0
France	2

=== Repechage ===
Repechage round 1
Turkey	2
Tunisia	0

Repechage round 2
Switzerland	2
Croatia	0
Turkey	0
Iran	1

Repechage round 3
Switzerland	2
Dominican Republic	0
Iran	2
Kosovo	0

Bronze medals
Switzerland	0
Egypt	2
Iran	0
Spain	2

=== Pool A ===
First round
Turkey	1
Japan	2
Bosnia and Herzegovina	0
Tunisia	2
Bulgaria	1
Netherlands	2
Iran	2
Senegal	0
Kosovo	2
Guatemala	0
Costa Rica	0
Chinese Taipei	0*
England	2
Azerbaijan	0

Second round
Japan	2
Tunisia	0
Netherlands	0
Iran	1
Kosovo	2
Chinese Taipei	1
England	1
United States	2

Third round
Japan	2
Iran	1
Kosovo	2
United States	0

Quarterfinals
Japan	2
Kosovo	0

=== Pool B ===
First round
Australia	1
Denmark	2
Belarus	0
Canada	2
Latvia	0
Austria	2
New Zealand	2
Portugal	1
Sweden	2
Jordan	0
Ireland	0
Italy	2
Slovakia	0
Mexico	2

Second round
Denmark	0
Canada	2
Austria	2
New Zealand	0
Sweden	0
Italy	2
Mexico
Spain	2

Third round
Canada	0
Austria	2
Italy	1
Spain	2

Quarterfinals
Austria	1
Spain	2

=== Pool C ===
First round
Brazil	0
Serbia	2
Germany	1*
Finland	1
Macedonia	0
South Africa	2
Algeria	0
Russia	2
Peru	1
Montenegro	2
Venezuela	0
China	2
India	1
Kazakhstan	2

Second round
Serbia	2
Germany	0
South Africa	0
Russia	2
Montenegro	0
China	2
Kazakhstan	0
Egypt	1

Third round
Serbia	0
Russia	2
China	1
Egypt	1*

Quarterfinals
Russia	0
Egypt	2

=== Pool D ===
First round
Dominican Republic	2
Colombia	0
Norway	2
Belgium	0
Slovenia	0
Poland	2
Israel	2
Romania	1
Croatia	4
Hong Kong	2
Switzerland	2
Ukraine	0

Second round
Dominican Republic	2
Norway	1
Poland	1
Czech Republic	2
Israel	1
Croatia	2
Switzerland	0
France	2

Third round
Dominican Republic	2
Czech Republic	1
Croatia	0
France	0*

Quarterfinals
Dominican Republic	0
France	3
