= Karate at the 2020 Summer Olympics – Women's 61 kg =

Karate competition

Women's kumite 61 kg at the Games of the XXXII Olympiad
- Venue: Nippon Budokan
- Date: 6 August 2021
- Competitors: 10 from 10 nations

Medalists
| 1st place, gold medalist(s) | | Jovana Preković | Serbia |
| 2nd place, silver medalist(s) | | Yin Xiaoyan | China |
| 3rd place, bronze medalist(s) | | Giana Farouk | Egypt |
| 3rd place, bronze medalist(s) | | Merve Çoban | Turkey |

The women's kumite 61 kg competition in Karate at the 2020 Summer Olympics was held on 6 August 2021 at the Nippon Budokan.

== Competition format ==
The competition began with a two-pool round-robin stage followed by a single elimination stage. Each pool consisted of five athletes, with those positioned 1st and 4th seeded to Pool A, and those positioned 2nd and 3rd to Pool B. The athlete that finished first in Pool A faced the athlete that finished second in Pool B in the semifinals, and vice versa. There were no bronze medal matches in the kumite events. Losers of the semifinals each received a bronze medal.

== Schedule ==
All times are in local time (UTC+9).

| Date | Time | Round |
|---|---|---|
| Friday, 6 August 2021 | 12:28; 20:05; 20:40; 21:00 | Pool stage Semifinals; Gold medal match Victory ceremony |

== Results ==
=== Pool stage ===
Pool A

| Pos | Athlete | B | W | D | L | Pts | Score | (China) | (Turkey) | (Venezuela) | (Japan) | (France) |
|---|---|---|---|---|---|---|---|---|---|---|---|---|
| 1 | Yin Xiaoyan (CHN) | 4 | 4 | 0 | 0 | 8 | 9–4 | — | 2–2 | 2–0 | 4–2 | 1–0 |
| 2 | Merve Çoban (TUR) | 4 | 2 | 0 | 2 | 4 (Note: Çoban (TUR) 6–2 Garcés (VEN)) | 12–6 | 2–2 | — | 6–2 | 4–0 | 0–2 |
| 3 | Claudymar Garcés (VEN) | 4 | 2 | 0 | 2 | 4 | 18–13 | 0–2 | 2–6 | — | 8–5 | 8–0 |
| 4 | Mayumi Someya (JPN) | 4 | 1 | 0 | 3 | 2 (Note: Someya (JPN) 6–3 Heurtault (FRA)) | 13–19 | 2–4 | 0–4 | 5–8 | — | 6–3 |
| 5 | Leïla Heurtault (FRA) | 4 | 1 | 0 | 3 | 2 | 5–15 | 0–1 | 2–0 | 0–8 | 3–6 | — |

Source: Tokyo 2020
Notes:

Pool B

| Pos | Athlete | B | W | D | L | Pts | Score | (Serbia) | (Egypt) | (Ukraine) | (Peru) | (Morocco) |
|---|---|---|---|---|---|---|---|---|---|---|---|---|
| 1 | Jovana Preković (SRB) | 4 | 4 | 0 | 0 | 8 | 11–6 | — | 1–1 | 6–4 | 1–0 | 3–1 |
| 2 | Giana Farouk (EGY) | 4 | 3 | 0 | 1 | 6 | 10–2 | 1–1 | — | 2–1 | 2–0 | 5–0 |
| 3 | Anita Serogina (UKR) | 4 | 1 | 1 | 2 | 3 | 12–10 | 4–6 | 1–2 | — | 6–1 | 1–1 |
| 4 | Alexandra Grande (PER) | 4 | 1 | 0 | 3 | 2 | 4–10 | 0–1 | 0–2 | 1–6 | — | 3–1 |
| 5 | Btissam Sadini (MAR) | 4 | 0 | 1 | 3 | 1 | 3–12 | 1–3 | 0–5 | 1–1 | 1–3 | — |

Source: Tokyo 2020

=== Finals ===
Semifinals
A1 Yin Xiaoyan (CHN) | 1
B2 Giana Farouk (EGY) (bronze) | 1
B1 Jovana Preković (SRB) | 2
A2 Merve Çoban (TUR) (bronze) | 0

Gold medal
A1 Yin Xiaoyan (CHN) (silver) | 0
B1 Jovana Preković (SRB) (gold) | 0
