= Karate at the 2020 Summer Olympics – Men's 67 kg =

Karate competition

Men's kumite 67 kg at the Games of the XXXII Olympiad
- Venue: Nippon Budokan
- Date: 5 August 2021
- Competitors: 11 from 11 nations (including 1 EOR athlete)

Medalists
1st place, gold medalist(s)		Steven Da Costa	France
2nd place, silver medalist(s)		Eray Şamdan	Turkey
3rd place, bronze medalist(s)		Darkhan Assadilov	Kazakhstan
3rd place, bronze medalist(s)		Abdelrahman Al-Masatfa	Jordan

The men's kumite 67 kg competition in Karate at the 2020 Summer Olympics was held on 5 August 2021 at the Nippon Budokan.

== Competition format ==
The competition began with a two-pool round-robin stage followed by a single elimination stage. Each pool consisted of five athletes, with those positioned 1st and 4th seeded to Pool A, and those positioned 2nd and 3rd to Pool B. The athlete that finished first in Pool A faced the athlete that finished second in Pool B in the semifinals, and vice versa. There were no bronze medal matches in the kumite events. Losers of the semifinals each received a bronze medal.

However, the inclusion of an EOR athlete led to this particular event having 11 competitors. As a result, Pool B had six competitors and 15 bouts in total.

== Schedule ==
All times are in local time (UTC+9).

Date	Time	Round
Thursday, 5 August 2021	12:05; 20:05; 20:40; 21:00	Pool stage Semifinals; Gold medal match Victory ceremony

== Results ==
Event Summary Report

=== Pool stage ===
Pool A

Athlete	Pld	W	L	Pts	Qualification
Darkhan Assadilov (KAZ)	4	4	0	8	Semifinals
Eray Şamdan (TUR)	4	3	1	6	Semifinals
Ali El-Sawy (EGY)	4	1	3	2	Points won: 6
Naoto Sago (JPN)	4	1	3	2	Points won: 5
Firdovsi Farzaliyev (AZE)	4	1	3	2	Points won: 4

Pool B

Athlete	Pld	W	L	Pts	Qualification
Abdelrahman Al-Masatfa (JOR)	4	4	0	8	Semifinals
Steven Da Costa (FRA)	4	3	1	6	Semifinals
Hamoon Derafshipour (EOR)	4	2	2	4	
Kalvis Kalniņš (LAT)	4	1	3	2	
Andrés Madera (VEN)	4	0	4	0	
~~Angelo Crescenzo (ITA)~~	0	0	0	0	Withdrawn

=== Finals ===
Semifinals
A1 Darkhan Assadilov (KAZ) (bronze)	2
B2 Steven Da Costa (FRA)	5
B1 Abdelrahman Al-Masatfa (JOR) (bronze)	0
A2 Eray Şamdan (TUR)	2

Gold medal
B2 Steven Da Costa (FRA) (gold)	5
A2 Eray Şamdan (TUR) (silver)	0
