= 2014 World Karate Championships =

Karate competition

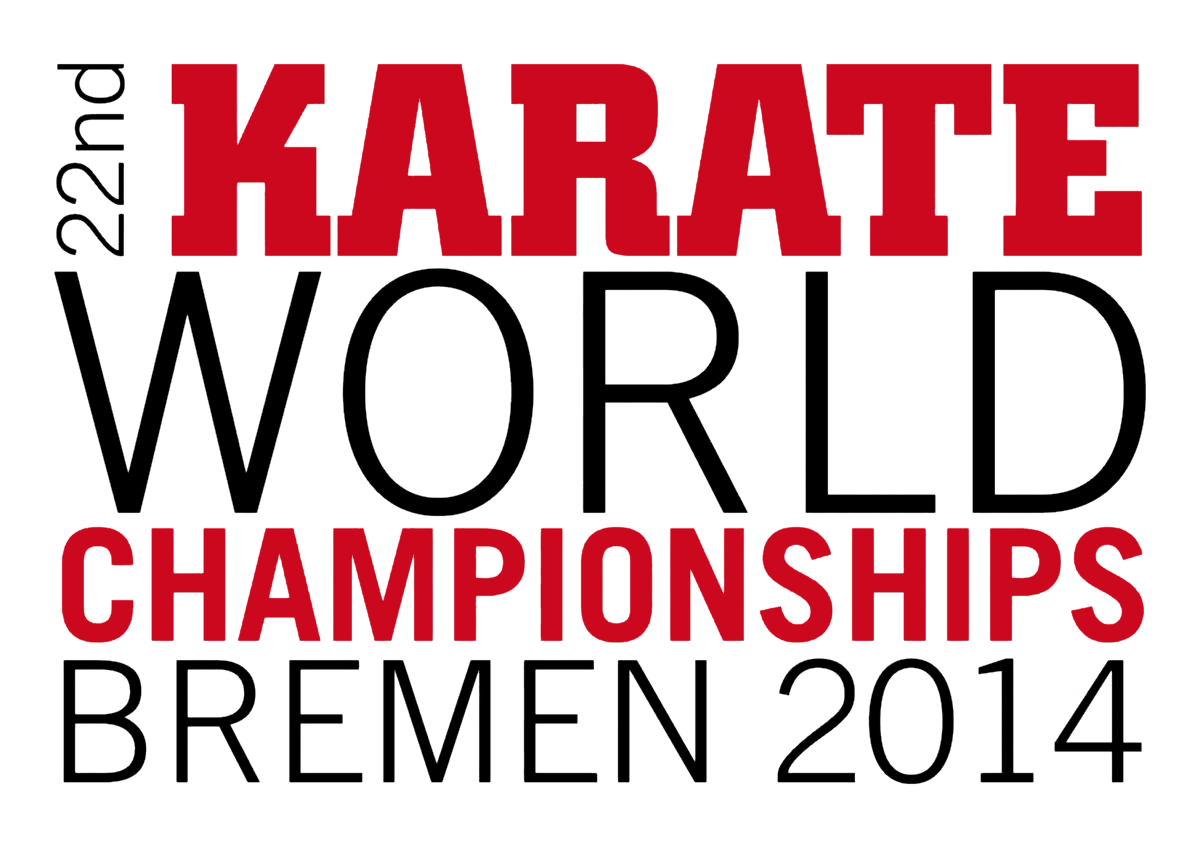
- Host city: Bremen, Germany
- Dates: 5–9 November
- Main venue: ÖVB Arena
- Website: http://karate2014.de/

The 2014 World Karate Championships were the 22nd edition of the World Karate Championships, and were held in Bremen, Germany from November 5 to November 9, 2014.

== Medalists ==
=== Men ===
Event	Gold	Silver	Bronze
Individual kata	Ryo Kiyuna; Japan	Ilja Smorguner; Germany	Vu Duc Minh Dack; France
Individual kata	Ryo Kiyuna; Japan	Ilja Smorguner; Germany	Antonio Díaz; Venezuela
Team kata	Spain; José Carbonell; Damián Quintero; Francisco Salazar	Egypt; Ibrahim Magdy; Ahmed Ashraf; Mohamed Hamdy	France; Vu Duc Minh Dack; William Geoffray; Rémi Martorana
Team kata	Spain; José Carbonell; Damián Quintero; Francisco Salazar	Egypt; Ibrahim Magdy; Ahmed Ashraf; Mohamed Hamdy	Malaysia; Thomson Hoe; Emmanuel Leong; Leong Tze Wai
Kumite −60 kg	Douglas Brose; Brazil	Geoffrey Berens; Netherlands	Evgeny Plakhutin; Russia
Kumite −60 kg	Douglas Brose; Brazil	Geoffrey Berens; Netherlands	Amir Mehdizadeh; Iran
Kumite −67 kg	William Rollé; France	Magdy Mamdouh; Egypt	Vinícius Figueira; Brazil
Kumite −67 kg	William Rollé; France	Magdy Mamdouh; Egypt	Kujtim Bajrami; Switzerland
Kumite −75 kg	Ryuichi Tani; Japan	Luigi Busà; Italy	Stanislav Horuna; Ukraine
Kumite −75 kg	Ryuichi Tani; Japan	Luigi Busà; Italy	Noah Bitsch; Germany
Kumite −84 kg	Gogita Arkania; Georgia	Ryutaro Araga; Japan	Gökhan Gündüz; Turkey
Kumite −84 kg	Gogita Arkania; Georgia	Ryutaro Araga; Japan	Mohamed El-Kotby; Egypt
Kumite +84 kg	Enes Erkan; Turkey	Sajjad Ganjzadeh; Iran	Admir Zukan; Bosnia and Herzegovina
Kumite +84 kg	Enes Erkan; Turkey	Sajjad Ganjzadeh; Iran	Jagoba Vizuete; Spain
Team kumite	Iran; Saeid Ahmadi; Bahman Asgari; Sajjad Ganjzadeh; Ebrahim Hassanbeigi; Saman Heidari; Zabihollah Pourshab; Iman Sanchouli	Germany; Andreas Bachmann; Noah Bitsch; Mehmet Bolat; Oliver Henning; Jonathan Horne; Heinrich Leistenschneider; Nika Tsurtsumia	Turkey; Uğur Aktaş; Erman Eltemur; Enes Erkan; Gökhan Gündüz; Rıdvan Kaptan; Yaser Şahintekin; Serkan Yağcı
Team kumite	Iran; Saeid Ahmadi; Bahman Asgari; Sajjad Ganjzadeh; Ebrahim Hassanbeigi; Saman Heidari; Zabihollah Pourshab; Iman Sanchouli	Germany; Andreas Bachmann; Noah Bitsch; Mehmet Bolat; Oliver Henning; Jonathan Horne; Heinrich Leistenschneider; Nika Tsurtsumia	Japan; Ryutaro Araga; Rikiya Iimura; Masaya Ishizuka; Hideyoshi Kagawa; Hiroto Shinohara; Ryuichi Tani; Daisuke Watanabe

=== Women ===
Event	Gold	Silver	Bronze
Individual kata	Kiyou Shimizu; Japan	Sandy Scordo; France	Yaiza Martín; Spain
Individual kata	Kiyou Shimizu; Japan	Sandy Scordo; France	Jasmin Bleul; Germany
Team kata	Germany; Jasmin Bleul; Christine Heinrich; Sophie Wachter	Japan; Suzuka Kashioka; Yoko Kimura; Miku Morioka	Italy; Sara Battaglia; Viviana Bottaro; Michela Pezzetti
Team kata	Germany; Jasmin Bleul; Christine Heinrich; Sophie Wachter	Japan; Suzuka Kashioka; Yoko Kimura; Miku Morioka	Iran; Mahsa Afsaneh; Najmeh Ghazizadeh; Elnaz Taghipour
Kumite −50 kg	Serap Özçelik; Turkey	Duygu Buğur; Germany	Rocío Sánchez; Spain
Kumite −50 kg	Serap Özçelik; Turkey	Duygu Buğur; Germany	Alexandra Recchia; France
Kumite −55 kg	Sara Cardin; Italy	Emily Thouy; France	Miki Kobayashi; Japan
Kumite −55 kg	Sara Cardin; Italy	Emily Thouy; France	Jana Bitsch; Germany
Kumite −61 kg	Giana Farouk; Egypt	Syakilla Salni; Malaysia	Laura Pasqua; Italy
Kumite −61 kg	Giana Farouk; Egypt	Syakilla Salni; Malaysia	Mayumi Someya; Japan
Kumite −68 kg	Alizée Agier; France	Gitte Brunstad; Norway	Irina Zaretska; Ukraine
Kumite −68 kg	Alizée Agier; France	Gitte Brunstad; Norway	Alisa Buchinger; Austria
Kumite +68 kg	Shymaa Abou-El-Yazed; Egypt	Hamideh Abbasali; Iran	Ayumi Uekusa; Japan
Kumite +68 kg	Shymaa Abou-El-Yazed; Egypt	Hamideh Abbasali; Iran	Laura Palacio; Spain
Team kumite	Egypt; Shymaa Abou-El-Yazed; Yassmin Hamdy; Giana Farouk; Fatma Al-Zahraa	France; Nadège Aït-Ibrahim; Leïla Heurtault; Lucie Ignace; Alexandra Recchia	Japan; Natsumi Kawamura; Miki Kobayashi; Mayumi Someya; Ayumi Uekusa
Team kumite	Egypt; Shymaa Abou-El-Yazed; Yassmin Hamdy; Giana Farouk; Fatma Al-Zahraa	France; Nadège Aït-Ibrahim; Leïla Heurtault; Lucie Ignace; Alexandra Recchia	Turkey; Buse Avcu; Merve Çoban; Meltem Hocaoğlu; Serap Özçelik

== Medal table ==
Rank	Nation	Gold	Silver	Bronze	Total
1	Japan	3	2	5	10
2	Egypt	3	2	1	6
3	France	2	3	3	8
4	Turkey	2	0	3	5
5	Germany	1	3	3	7
6	Iran	1	2	2	5
7	Italy	1	1	2	4
8	Spain	1	0	4	5
9	Brazil	1	0	1	2
10	Georgia	1	0	0	1
11	Malaysia	0	1	1	2
12	Netherlands	0	1	0	1
12	Norway	0	1	0	1
14	Ukraine	0	0	2	2
15	Austria	0	0	1	1
15	Bosnia and Herzegovina	0	0	1	1
15	Russia	0	0	1	1
15	Switzerland	0	0	1	1
15	Venezuela	0	0	1	1
Totals (19 entries)		16	16	32	64

== Participating nations ==
887 athletes from 116 nations competed.

- Albania (4)
- Algeria (10)
- Argentina (5)
- Armenia (2)
- Australia (7)
- Austria (10)
- Azerbaijan (12)
- Bahrain (2)
- Belarus (12)
- Belgium (11)
- Belize (1)
- Bolivia (1)
- Bosnia and Herzegovina (12)
- Botswana (6)
- Brazil (15)
- Bulgaria (7)
- Canada (14)
- Chad (4)
- Chile (13)
- China (11)
- Chinese Taipei (4)
- Colombia (11)
- Congo (6)
- Croatia (16)
- Curaçao (4)
- Cyprus (2)
- Czech Republic (10)
- Denmark (12)
- Dominican Republic (12)
- Ecuador (6)
- Egypt (16)
- El Salvador (2)
- England (14)
- Estonia (4)
- Fiji (2)
- Finland (10)
- France (16)
- Gabon (6)
- Georgia (5)
- Germany (15)
- Greece (12)
- Guatemala (6)
- Guinea (2)
- Hong Kong (13)
- Hungary (14)
- Iceland (4)
- India (14)
- Indonesia (5)
- Iran (16)
- Iraq (7)
- Ireland (10)
- Israel (7)
- Italy (13)
- Japan (16)
- Jordan (3)
- Kazakhstan (13)
- Kuwait (7)
- Latvia (7)
- Lebanon (2)
- Luxembourg (7)
- Macau (8)
- Macedonia (9)
- Madagascar (2)
- Malaysia (9)
- Mali (2)
- Mexico (9)
- Moldova (2)
- Montenegro (8)
- Morocco (8)
- Myanmar (1)
- Netherlands (7)
- Nepal (8)
- New Zealand (9)
- Nicaragua (2)
- Northern Ireland (1)
- Norway (4)
- Pakistan (1)
- Palestine (1)
- Paraguay (3)
- Peru (11)
- Philippines (4)
- Poland (13)
- Portugal (6)
- Qatar (4)
- Romania (14)
- Russia (15)
- Rwanda (3)
- San Marino (2)
- Saudi Arabia (7)
- Scotland (5)
- Senegal (1)
- Serbia (14)
- Singapore (1)
- Slovakia (11)
- Slovenia (11)
- South Africa (13)
- South Korea (10)
- Spain (16)
- Suriname (1)
- Sweden (4)
- Switzerland (9)
- Tajikistan (1)
- Thailand (1)
- Trinidad and Tobago (1)
- Tunisia (12)
- Turkey (16)
- Ukraine (12)
- United Arab Emirates (7)
- United States (16)
- Uruguay (1)
- Uzbekistan (11)
- Venezuela (15)
- Vietnam (2)
- Wales (11)
- Yemen (1)
- Zimbabwe (1)
