= Iman Sanchooli =

Iranian karateka

- Born: 12 August 1993 (age 33); Galikesh, Golestan, Iran
- Height: 185 cm (6 ft 1 in)
- Weight: 84 Kg
- Style: Kumite
- Teacher: Aliakbar Barani
- Rank: Black belt, 5th dan

Other information
- Website: www.instagram.com/iman_sanchooli/

Iman Sanchooli
Medal record

Representing Iran Northern Ireland

84+ KG Men's Karate

World karate Championships
Gold medal – first place	2016 Linz	Team kumite
Gold medal – first place	2014 Bremen	Team kumite

Karate1 Premier League
Gold medal – first place	2014 Indonesia	kumite 84kg
Gold medal – first place	2014 Japan	kumite 84kg
Bronze medal – third place	2015 france	kumite 84kg

Asian Karate Championships
Silver medal – second place	2015 Japan	kumite 84kg

Open karate championships
Gold medal – first place	2015 france	kumite 84 kg
Gold medal – first place	2015 france	Team kumite
Silver medal – second place	2015 Iran	kumite 84kg
Silver medal – second place	2015 Iran	Team kumite
Gold medal – first place	2016 Iran	kumite 84kg
Gold medal – first place	2016 Austria	Team kumite
Gold medal – first place	2016 Switzerland	kumite 84kg

British karate championships
Gold medal – first place	2018 England	kumite 84kg
Gold medal – first place	2019 England	kumite 84kg

World Youth karate championships
Gold medal – first place	2010 Greece	kumite +76 kg

Iman Sanchooli (Persian: ایمان سنچولی, born 12 August 1993 in Golestan) is an Iranian karateka. He has participated in Two world karate championships (2014 - 2016) and he won two gold medals.also he won the silver medal of 2015 Asian Karate Championships, and more than 10 medals of Open Karate Tournament and Karate Premier league.

== Early life ==
Iman Sanchooli was born in Galikesh, Golestan, on 12 August 1993, He began Karate training at age 7 with his first coach Aliakbar Barani in Galikesh City. Winning several medals of provincial and national championships, then he became a member of Iran National Karate team.

Sanchooli immigrated to Northern Ireland Country in 2017 then he participated in 2018 and 2019 the British Karate Championships and won two gold medals. Additionally competed in the Serie A-2019 Turkey Karate Premier League as a member of the Northern Ireland national team, and achieved 5th place in the 84 kg category.

== See also ==
- World karate Championships
- Asian Karate Championships
- Karate1 Premier League
