= Jovana Preković =

Serbian karateka (born 1996)

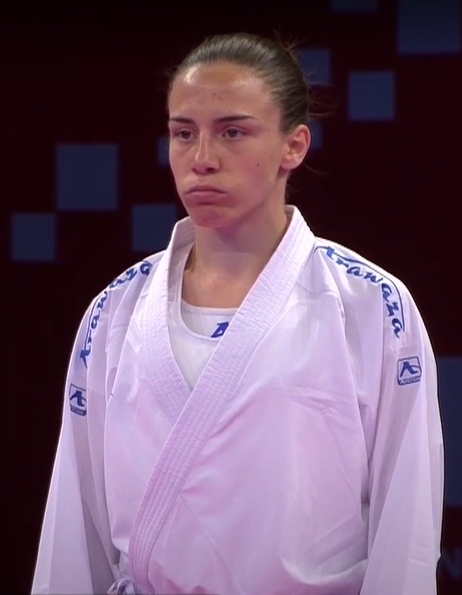
- Preković at 2021 EKF Senior Championships
- Born: 20 January 1996 (age 30); Aranđelovac, Serbia, FR Yugoslavia
- Nationality: Serbian
- Division: –61 kg
- Style: Karate Kumite
- Team: Karate Klub "Knjaz" Aranđelovac
- Trainer: Roksanda Atanasov
- Rank: Black Belt

Jovana Preković (Serbian Cyrillic: Јована Прековић; born 20 January 1996) is a Serbian former karateka competing in kumite -61 kg division. She is a two-time world champion in the women's kumite 61 kg event (2018 and 2021) and the 2020 Olympic champion, in karate's lone appearance as a Summer Olympic sport.

== Career ==
She entered the Paris Open of the Karate1 Premier League in January 2017, winning a gold medal in the -61 kg category after beating Merve Çoban of Turkey. By doing so, Preković became the first Serbian to win a gold medal at the event.

In November 2018, Preković won gold in the -61 kg at the 2018 World Championships in Madrid, Spain, beating Yin Xiaoyan of China 8–5 in the final to win the gold medal.

In Mach 2021 she won gold medal at Karate Premier League Final in Istanbul, while in May became European champion in Poreč. Preković represented Serbia at the 2020 Summer Olympics in Tokyo, Japan, held in 2021. As the sport made its Olympic debut that year, she was the first Serbian karetka at the Olympics. In the women's 61 kg event, Preković reached the final where she again defeated Yin Xiaoyan to win the gold medal. It was Serbia's second gold of the 2020 Olympics, and seventh medal overall.

Preković ended 2021 with the 2021 World Championships, held in November in Dubai. She became World Champion for the second time in succession, successfully defending the -61 kg title she first won in 2018. In the final Preković defeated Anita Serogina of Ukraine by a score of 2–1. In December 2021 Preković was named Sportswoman of the Year in Serbia. She announced her retirement from professional competition in November 2022.
