= Natsumi Kawamura =

Japanese karateka

Sport
- Country: Japan
- Sport: Karate
- Event: Kumite
Medal record
Women's karate
Representing Japan
World Championships
Silver medal – second place	2018 Madrid	Team kumite
Bronze medal – third place	2014 Bremen	Team kumite
Asian Championships
Gold medal – first place	2018 Amman	Team kumite
Silver medal – second place	2019 Tashkent	Team kumite
Bronze medal – third place	2017 Astana	Team kumite

Natsumi Kawamura is a Japanese karateka. At the 2018 World Karate Championships held in Madrid, Spain, she won the silver medal in the women's team kumite event.

At the 2019 Asian Karate Championships held in Tashkent, Uzbekistan, she also won the silver medal in the women's team kumite event.

== Achievements ==
Year	Competition	Venue	Rank	Event
2014	World Championships	Bremen, Germany	3rd	Team kumite
2017	Asian Championships	Astana, Kazakhstan	3rd	Team kumite
2018	Asian Championships	Amman, Jordan	1st	Team kumite
2018	World Championships	Madrid, Spain	2nd	Team kumite
2019	Asian Championships	Tashkent, Uzbekistan	2nd	Team kumite
