= Ihor Uhnich =

Ukrainian karateka

- Born: Угнич Ігор Валентинович; May 4, 1985 (age 41)
- Nationality: Ukrainian
- Style: Karate Kumite
- Team: "МГО СК Сен-бін", Kyiv

Ihor Uhnich (Ukrainian: Угнич Ігор Валентинович, born May 4, 1985) is a Ukrainian karateka competing in the kumite 75 kg division. He is 2017 and 2018 European Team Championships medalist.
