= Giana Farouk =

Egyptian karateka (born 1994)

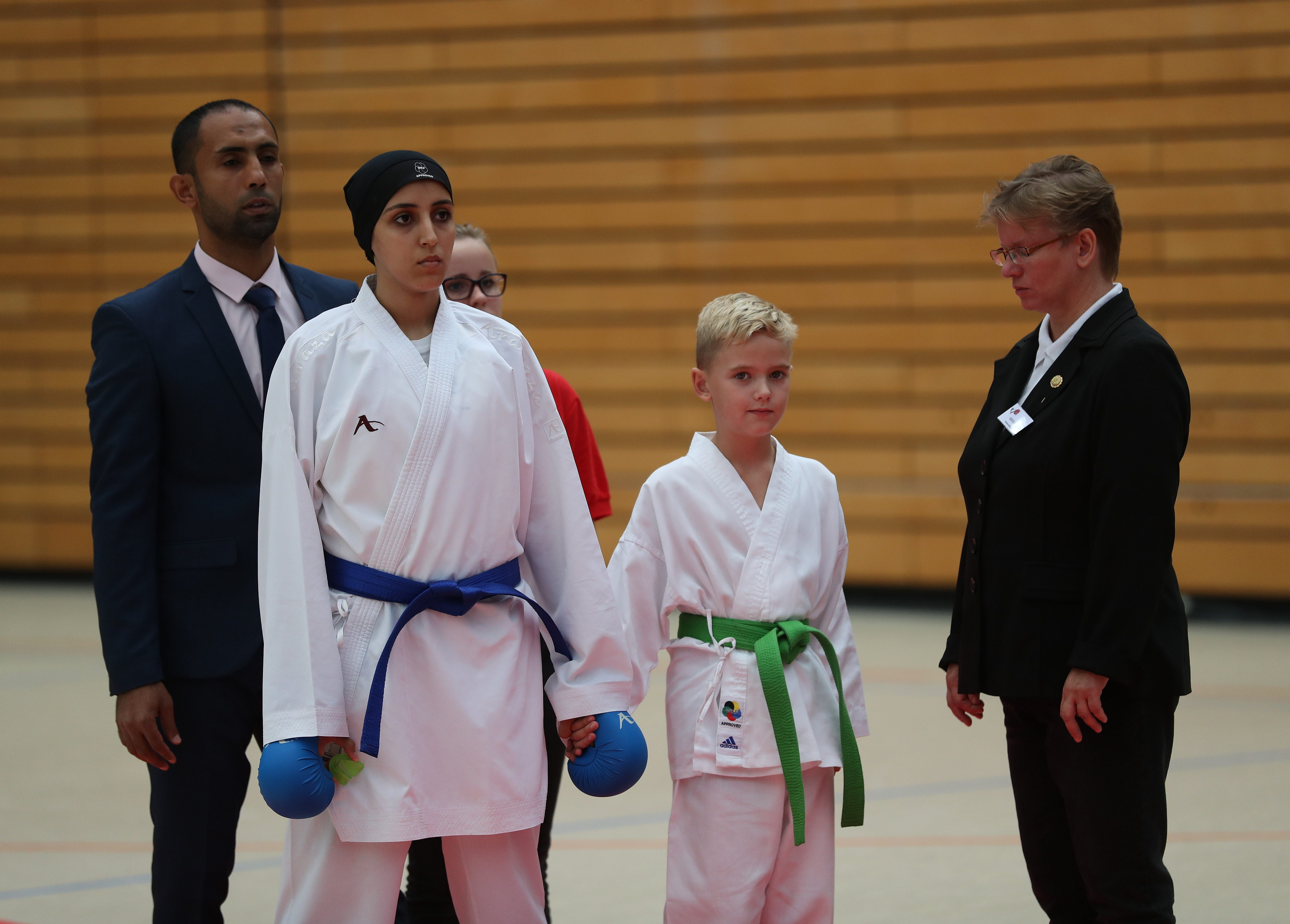
- Farouk in 2018

Personal information
- Native name: جيانا محمد فاروق لطفي
- Full name: Giana Mohamed Farouk Lotfy
- Born: 10 December 1994 (age 31)

Sport
- Country: Egypt
- Sport: Karate
- Weight class: 61 kg
- Events: Kumite; Team kumite
Medal record
Women's karate
Representing Egypt
Olympic Games
Bronze medal – third place	2020 Tokyo	Kumite 61 kg
World Championships
Gold medal – first place	2014 Bremen	Kumite 61 kg
Gold medal – first place	2014 Bremen	Team kumite
Gold medal – first place	2016 Linz	Kumite 61 kg
Bronze medal – third place	2016 Linz	Team kumite
Bronze medal – third place	2018 Madrid	Kumite 61 kg
Bronze medal – third place	2018 Madrid	Team kumite
African Games
Gold medal – first place	2015 Brazzaville	Kumite 61 kg
Bronze medal – third place	2019 Rabat	Kumite 61 kg
Bronze medal – third place	2015 Brazzaville	Team kumite
Islamic Solidarity Games
Gold medal – first place	2013 Palembang	Kumite 61 kg
Mediterranean Games
Gold medal – first place	2013 Mersin	Kumite 61 kg
Silver medal – second place	2018 Tarragona	Kumite 61 kg

Giana Mohamed Farouk Lotfy (Egyptian Arabic: جيانا محمد فاروق لطفي; born 10 December 1994) is an Egyptian karateka. She won one of the bronze medals in the women's 61 kg event at the 2020 Summer Olympics held in Tokyo, Japan. She is a two-time gold medalist in the women's kumite 61 kg event at the World Karate Championships. She is also a gold medalist in her event at the African Games, the Islamic Solidarity Games and the Mediterranean Games.

== Career ==
She won the gold medal in the women's 61 kg event at the 2016 World University Karate Championships held in Braga, Portugal.

In 2018, she won the silver medal in the women's kumite 61 kg event at the Mediterranean Games held in Tarragona, Spain. In that same year, she won one of the bronze medals in the women's kumite 61 kg event at the 2018 World Karate Championships held in Madrid, Spain.

She won the gold medal in her event at the 2019 African Karate Championships held in Gaborone, Botswana. She represented Egypt at the 2019 African Games held in Rabat, Morocco and she won one of the bronze medals in the women's kumite 61 kg event.

She represented Egypt at the 2020 Summer Olympics in karate. She won one of the bronze medals in the women's 61 kg event.

== Achievements ==
Year	Competition	Venue	Rank	Event
2013	Mediterranean Games	Mersin, Turkey	1st	Kumite 61 kg
2013	Islamic Solidarity Games	Palembang, Indonesia	1st	Kumite 61 kg
2014	World Championships	Bremen, Germany	1st	Kumite 61 kg
2014	World Championships	Bremen, Germany	1st	Team kumite
2015	African Games	Brazzaville, Republic of the Congo	1st	Kumite 61 kg
2015	African Games	Brazzaville, Republic of the Congo	3rd	Team kumite
2016	World Championships	Linz, Austria	1st	Kumite 61 kg
2016	World Championships	Linz, Austria	3rd	Team kumite
2018	Mediterranean Games	Tarragona, Spain	2nd	Kumite 61 kg
2018	World Championships	Madrid, Spain	3rd	Kumite 61 kg
2018	World Championships	Madrid, Spain	3rd	Team kumite
2019	African Games	Rabat, Morocco	3rd	Kumite 61 kg
2021	Summer Olympics	Tokyo, Japan	3rd	Kumite 61 kg
