= Lucie Ignace =

French karateka (born 1992)

- Born: 16 December 1992 (age 33)
- Nationality: French
- Trainer: Georges Hafizou

Other information
- Notable club: Karaté Shoto Club de Bras-Panon

Lucie Ignace (born 16 December 1992 in Saint-Denis, Réunion) is a French karateka. She won the gold medal in the 55 kg category at the 2012 World Karate Championships in Paris after securing a bronze medal at the 2012 European Karate Championships in Tenerife. In June 2015, she competed in the inaugural European Games, for France in karate, more specifically, Women's Kumite for 61 kilograms. She earned a gold medal.

At the 2013 World Games held in Cali, Colombia, she won the gold medal in the women's kumite 55 kg event.
