= Leïla Heurtault =

French karateka (born 1995)

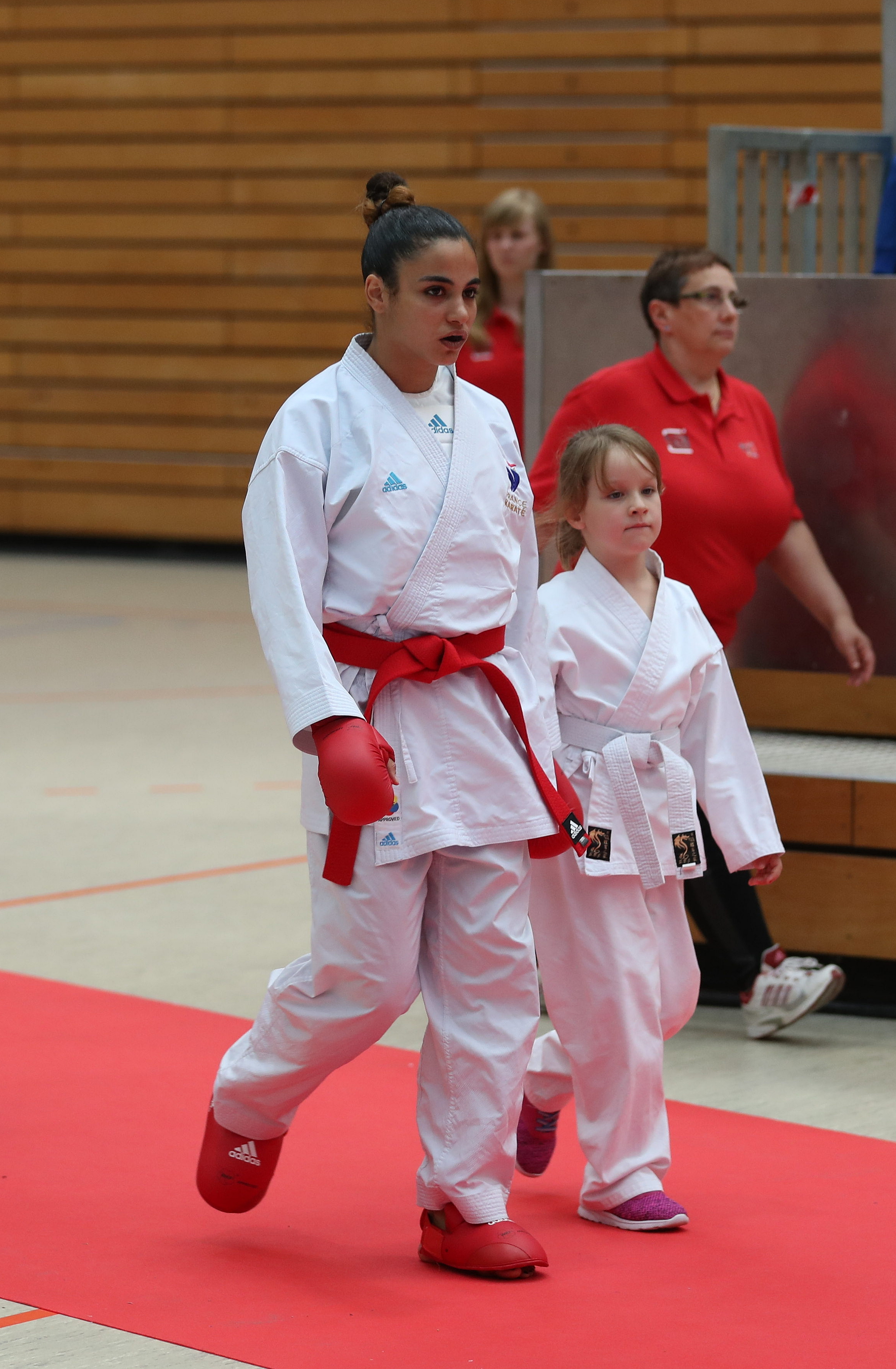
- Heurtault in 2018

Personal information
- Born: 4 January 1995 (age 31)

Sport
- Country: France
- Sport: Karate
- Weight class: 61 kg
- Events: Kumite; Team kumite
Medal record
Women's karate
Representing France
World Championships
Gold medal – first place	2016 Linz	Team kumite
Gold medal – first place	2018 Madrid	Team kumite
Silver medal – second place	2014 Bremen	Team kumite
European Championships
Bronze medal – third place	2017 İzmit	Team kumite
Bronze medal – third place	2021 Poreč	Kumite 61 kg

Leïla Heurtault (born 4 January 1995) is a French karateka. She is a three-time medalist, including two golds, in the women's team kumite event at the World Karate Championships.

Heurtault represented France at the 2020 Summer Olympics in Tokyo, Japan. She competed in the women's 61 kg event.

== Career ==
In 2016, Heurtault won the gold medal in the women's team kumite event at the World Karate Championships held in Linz, Austria. Two years later, she also won the gold medal in the same event at the 2018 World Karate Championships held in Madrid, Spain.

In 2021, Heurtault competed at the World Olympic Qualification Tournament held in Paris, France hoping to qualify for the 2020 Summer Olympics in Tokyo, Japan. She did not qualify at this tournament but she qualified after reassignment of the last qualifying spots. She finished in fifth place in her pool during the pool stage in the women's 61 kg event and she did not advance to compete in the semifinals.

== Personal life ==
Her younger sister Sara Heurtault also competes in karate and she won two medals at the 2018 World University Karate Championships held in Kobe, Japan.

== Achievements ==
Year	Competition	Venue	Rank	Event
2014	World Championships	Bremen, Germany	2nd	Team kumite
2016	World Championships	Linz, Austria	1st	Team kumite
2017	European Championships	İzmit, Turkey	3rd	Team kumite
2018	World Championships	Madrid, Spain	1st	Team kumite
2021	European Championships	Poreč, Croatia	3rd	Kumite 61 kg
