= Mayumi Someya =

Japanese karateka (born 1993)

Personal information
- Born: 30 May 1993 (age 33)

Sport
- Country: Japan
- Sport: Karate
- Events: Kumite; Team kumite
Medal record
Women's karate
Representing Japan
World Championships
| Silver medal – second place | 2018 Madrid | Team kumite |
| Bronze medal – third place | 2014 Bremen | Kumite 61 kg |
| Bronze medal – third place | 2014 Bremen | Team kumite |
Asian Championships
| Gold medal – first place | 2018 Amman | Team kumite |
| Silver medal – second place | 2015 Yokohama | Kumite 61 kg |
| Bronze medal – third place | 2012 Tashkent | Kumite 68 kg |
| Bronze medal – third place | 2012 Tashkent | Team kumite |

Mayumi Someya (染谷 真有美, Someya Mayumi, born 30 May 1993) is a Japanese karateka. At the 2018 World Karate Championships held in Madrid, Spain, she won the silver medal in the women's team kumite event. She represented Japan at the 2020 Summer Olympics in the women's 61 kg event.

== Personal life ==
She is the younger sister of Kayo Someya, also a karateka and a colleague of Japan's national karate team.

== Achievements ==
| Year | Competition | Venue | Rank | Event |
|---|---|---|---|---|
| 2012 | Asian Championships | Tashkent, Uzbekistan | 3rd | Kumite 68 kg |
| 2012 | Asian Championships | Tashkent, Uzbekistan | 3rd | Team kumite |
| 2014 | World Championships | Bremen, Germany | 3rd | Kumite 61 kg |
| 2014 | World Championships | Bremen, Germany | 3rd | Team kumite |
| 2015 | Asian Championships | Yokohama, Japan | 2nd | Kumite 61 kg |
| 2018 | Asian Championships | Amman, Jordan | 1st | Team kumite |
| 2018 | World Championships | Madrid, Spain | 2nd | Team kumite |
