= Merve Çoban =

Turkish karateka (born 1993)

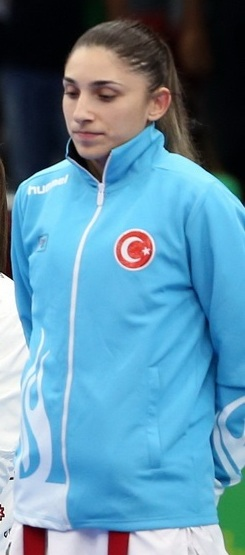
- Çoban in 2017

Personal information
- Born: 25 January 1993 (age 33) Bafra

Sport
- Country: Turkey
- Sport: Karate
- Weight class: 61 kg
- Events: Kumite; Team kumite
Medal record
Women's karate
Representing Turkey
Olympic Games
Bronze medal – third place	2020 Tokyo	Kumite 61 kg
World Championships
Bronze medal – third place	2014 Bremen	Team kumite
European Games
Silver medal – second place	2015 Baku	Kumite 61 kg
Bronze medal – third place	2019 Minsk	Kumite 61 kg
European Championships
Gold medal – first place	2014 Tampere	Team kumite
Gold medal – first place	2019 Guadalajara	Kumite 61 kg
Silver medal – second place	2014 Tampere	Kumite 68 kg
Silver medal – second place	2016 Montpellier	Kumite 61 kg
Silver medal – second place	2017 İzmit	Team kumite
Silver medal – second place	2019 Guadalajara	Team kumite
Silver medal – second place	2021 Poreč	Team kumite
Bronze medal – third place	2015 Istanbul	Team kumite
Bronze medal – third place	2016 Montpellier	Kumite 61 kg
Bronze medal – third place	2017 İzmit	Kumite 61 kg
Bronze medal – third place	2018 Novi Sad	Kumite 61 kg
Islamic Solidarity Games
Gold medal – first place	2013 Palembang	Kumite 68 kg
Bronze medal – third place	2017 Baku	Kumite 61 kg

Merve Çoban (born 25 January 1993) is a Turkish karateka. She won the bronze medal in the 61 kg event at the 2020 Summer Olympics in Tokyo, Japan. She is also a gold medalist and a two-time silver medalist in the women's kumite 61 kg event at the European Karate Championships.

She won the gold medal in the kumite 68 kg event at the 2013 Islamic Solidarity Games held in Palembang, Indonesia. She also represented her country at the European Games in 2015 and in 2019 and she won a medal on both occasions.

== Career ==
She won the silver medal in the women's kumite 61 kg event at the 2015 European Games held in Baku, Azerbaijan. At the 2019 European Games in Minsk, Belarus, she won one of the bronze medals in the women's kumite 61 kg event.

In 2019, she won the gold medal in the women's kumite 61 kg event at the European Karate Championships held in Guadalajara, Spain. She also won the silver medal in the women's team kumite event.

She represented Turkey at the 2020 Summer Olympics in karate. She won one of the bronze medals in the women's 61 kg event.

== Achievements ==
Year	Competition	Venue	Rank	Event
2013	Islamic Solidarity Games	Palembang, Indonesia	1st	Kumite 68 kg
2014	European Championships	Tampere, Finland	2nd	Kumite 68 kg
2014	European Championships	Tampere, Finland	1st	Team kumite
2014	World Championships	Bremen, Germany	3rd	Team kumite
2015	European Championships	Istanbul, Turkey	3rd	Team kumite
2015	European Games	Baku, Azerbaijan	2nd	Kumite 61 kg
2017	Islamic Solidarity Games	Baku, Azerbaijan	3rd	Kumite 61 kg
2018	European Championships	Novi Sad, Serbia	3rd	Kumite 61 kg
2019	European Games	Minsk, Belarus	3rd	Kumite 61 kg
2021	Olympic Games	Tokyo, Japan	3rd	Kumite 61 kg
