= Naoto Sago =

Japanese karateka

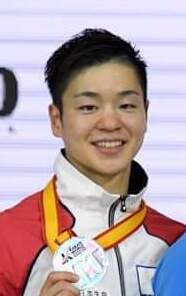
- Naoto Sago in 2018

Personal information
- Born: 19 June 1992 (age 34) Akishima, Tokyo

Sport
- Country: Japan
- Sport: Karate
- Weight class: 60 kg
- Event: Kumite
Medal record
Men's karate
Representing Japan
World Championships
Silver medal – second place	2018 Madrid	Kumite −60 kg

Naoto Sago (佐合尚人, Sagō Naoto, is a Japanese karateka. He won the silver medal in the men's kumite −60 kg event at the 2018 World Karate Championships held in Madrid, Spain. He represented Japan at the 2020 Summer Olympics in karate. He competed in the men's 67 kg event where he did not advance to compete in the semifinals.

== Achievements ==
Year	Competition	Venue	Rank	Event
2018	World Championships	Madrid, Spain	2nd	Kumite −60 kg
