= World University Karate Championships =

International karate competition

The World University Karate Championships is a competition sponsored by the International University Sports Federation (FISU) and have been held every two years since 1998 each time in a different host city.

== University ==
- World University Karate Championships

Number	Year	Location
1	1998	Lille, France
2	2000	Kyoto, Japan
3	2002	Puebla, Mexico
4	2004	Belgrade, Serbia
5	2006	New York, United States
6	2008	Wrocław, Poland
7	2010	Podgorica, Montenegro
8	2012	Bratislava, Slovakia
9	2014	Bar, Montenegro
10	2016	Braga, Portugal
11	2018	Kobe, Japan

== Champions ==
=== Men ===
Year	Location	Individual	Kumite -60 kg	Kumite -67 kg	Kumite -75 kg	Kumite -84 kg	Kumite 84+ kg	Team Kata	Team Kumite
2012	(Slovakia) Bratislava	(Spain) Damián Quintero	(Spain) Matías Gómez	(Turkey) Ömer Kemaloğlu	(Turkey) Serkan Yağcı	(Russia) Alexander Aliev	(Brazil) Wellington Barbosa	Japan	Montenegro
2014	(Montenegro) Bar	(Egypt) Ahmed Shawky	(Iran) Amir Mehdizadeh	(Hungary) Yves Martial Tadissi	(France) Logan Da Costa	(North Macedonia) Berat Jakupi	(Montenegro) Danilo Lucic	Japan	Iran
2016	(Portugal) Braga	(Japan) Hiroki Kubo	(Spain) Matías Gómez	(France) Steven Da Costa	(Egypt) Ali Elsawy	(Egypt) Mohamed Elkotby	(Montenegro) Ljubiša Mihailovic	Japan	Japan
2018	(Japan) Kobe	(Japan) Yuhei Horiba	(Turkey) Eray Samdan	(Italy) Francesco Donofrio	(Japan) Yusei Sakiyama	(United States) Kamran Madani	(Iran) Saleh Abazari	Japan	Japan

=== Women ===
Year	Location	Individual	Kumite -50 kg	Kumite -55 kg	Kumite -61 kg	Kumite -68 kg	Kumite +68 kg	Team Kata	Team Kumite
2012	(Slovenia) Bratislava	(Japan) Kiyou Shimizu	(Austria) Bettina Plank	(Turkey) Tuba Yakan	(France) Lucie Ignace	(France) Lamya Matoub	(Croatia) Maša Martinović	Slovakia	Egypt
2014	(Montenegro) Bar	(Japan) Kiyou Shimizu	(Iran) Sahar Karaji	(Egypt) Yassmin Hamdy	(Slovenia) Ingrida Suchánková	(Japan) Ayumi Uekusa	(Japan) Kawamura Natsumi	Belarus	Japan
2016	(Portugal) Braga	(Japan) Misaki Tanaka	(Spain) Rocío Sánchez	(France) Emily Thouy	(Egypt) Giana Lotfy	(France) Alizée Agier	(Japan) Kawamura Natsumi	Spain	Egypt
2018	(Japan) Kobe	(Japan) Natsuki Shimizu	(Japan) Miho Miyahara	(Japan) Haname Katayama	(Japan) Yuki Kujuro	(Japan) Kanako Oryu	(Germany) Rosa Marie Liebold	Japan	France
