= Alisa Buchinger =

Austrian karateka (born 1992)

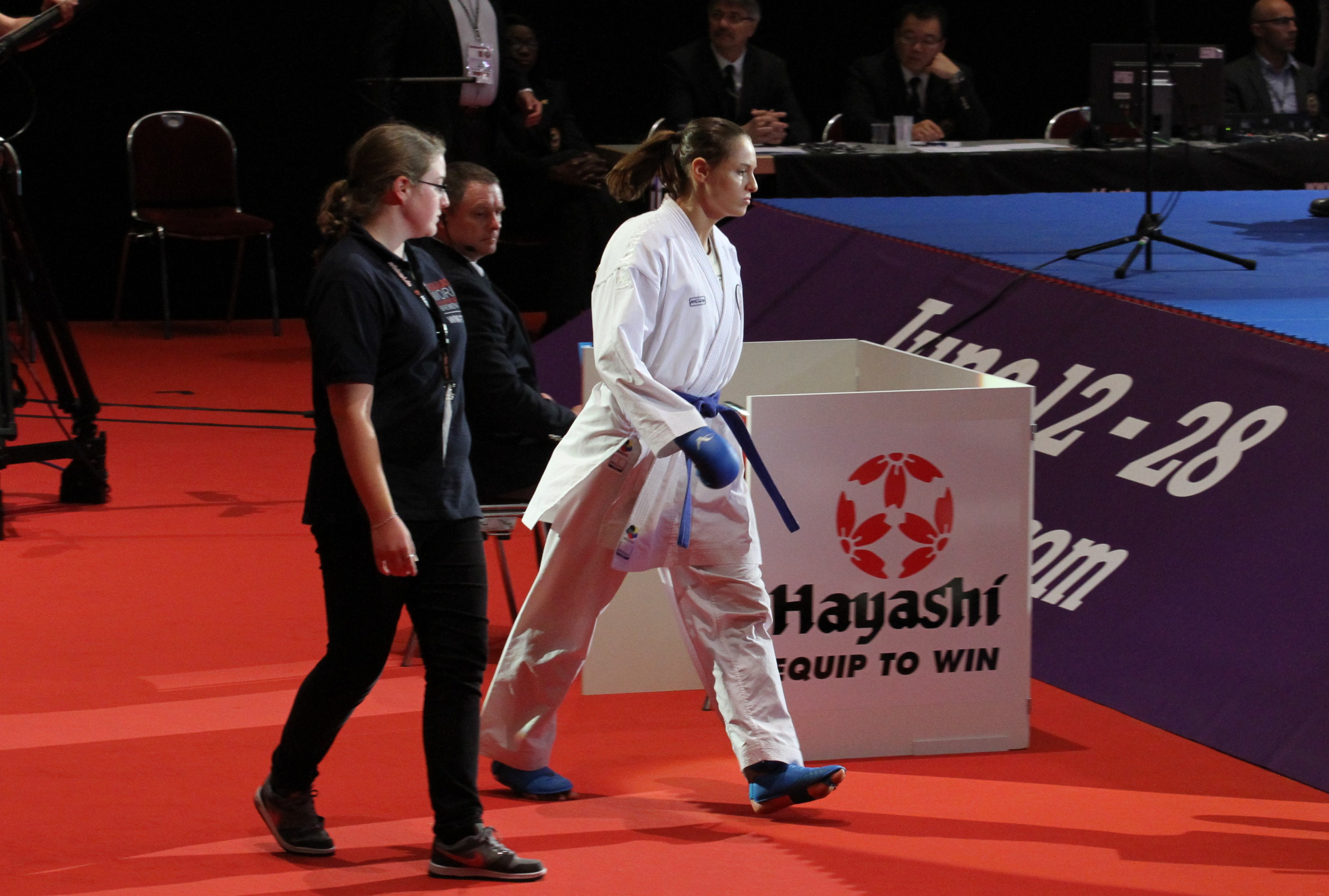
- Buchinger in 2014

Personal information
- Full name: Alisa Theresa Buchinger
- Born: 26 October 1992 (age 33) Salzburg, Austria
- Height: 172 cm (5 ft 8 in)
- Weight: 65 kg (143 lb)

Sport
- Country: Austria
- Sport: Karate
- Weight class: 68 kg
- Event: Kumite
Medal record
Women's karate
Representing Austria
World Championships
Gold medal – first place	2016 Linz	Kumite 68 kg
Bronze medal – third place	2014 Bremen	Kumite 68 kg
World Games
Silver medal – second place	2017 Wrocław	Kumite 68 kg
Silver medal – second place	2022 Birmingham	Kumite 68 kg
European Championships
Gold medal – first place	2015 Istanbul	Kumite 68 kg
Gold medal – first place	2017 İzmit	Kumite 68 kg
Silver medal – second place	2013 Budapest	Kumite 68 kg
Silver medal – second place	2016 Montpellier	Kumite 68 kg
Bronze medal – third place	2011 Zürich	Kumite 61 kg
European Games
Silver medal – second place	2015 Baku	Kumite 68 kg

Alisa Theresa Buchinger (born 26 October 1992) is an Austrian karateka. She won the gold medal in the women's kumite 68 kg at the 2016 World Karate Championships in Linz, Austria. She is also a two-time gold medalist in this event at the European Karate Championships, both in 2015 and in 2017.

== Career ==
Buchinger won one of the bronze medals in the women's kumite 61 kg event at the 2011 European Karate Championships held in Zürich, Switzerland. She won one of the bronze medals in the women's kumite 68 kg event at the 2014 World Karate Championships held in Bremen, Germany. She also competed in the women's team kumite event.

In 2015, Buchinger won the silver medal in the women's kumite 68 kg event at the European Games held in Baku, Azerbaijan. In the final, she lost against Irina Zaretska of Azerbaijan. She won the silver medal in her event at the 2016 World University Karate Championships held in Braga, Portugal. At the 2017 World Games held in Wrocław, Poland, Buchinger won the silver medal in the women's kumite 68 kg event. In the final, she lost against Lamya Matoub of Algeria.

In June 2021, Buchinger competed at the World Olympic Qualification Tournament held in Paris, France hoping to qualify for the 2020 Summer Olympics in Tokyo, Japan. She was eliminated in her first match. In November 2021, she lost her bronze medal match in the women's 68 kg event at the World Karate Championships held in Dubai, United Arab Emirates.

Buchinger competed in the women's 68 kg event at the 2022 European Karate Championships held in Gaziantep, Turkey. She also competed in the women's team kumite event. Buchinger won the silver medal in the women's 68 kg event at the 2022 World Games held in Birmingham, United States.

== Achievements ==
Year	Competition	Venue	Rank	Event
2011	European Championships	Zürich, Switzerland	3rd	Kumite 61 kg
2013	European Championships	Budapest, Hungary	2nd	Kumite 68 kg
2014	World Championships	Bremen, Germany	3rd	Kumite 68 kg
2015	European Championships	Istanbul, Turkey	1st	Kumite 68 kg
2015	European Games	Baku, Azerbaijan	2nd	Kumite 68 kg
2016	European Championships	Montpellier, France	2nd	Kumite 68 kg
2016	World Championships	Linz, Austria	1st	Kumite 68 kg
2017	European Championships	İzmit, Turkey	1st	Kumite 68 kg
2017	World Games	Wrocław, Poland	2nd	Kumite 68 kg
2022	World Games	Birmingham, United States	2nd	Kumite 68 kg
