= 2026 European Karate Championships – Women's 68 kg =

Women's 68 kg at the 2026 European Karate Championships
- Venue: Eissporthalle Frankfurt
- Location: Frankfurt, Germany
- Dates: 20, 23 May
- Competitors: 30 from 30 nations

Medalists
gold medal	Sadea Bećirović	Bosnia and Herzegovina
silver medal	Thalya Sombé	France
bronze medal	Irina Zaretska	Azerbaijan
bronze medal	Elina Sieliemienieva	Ukraine

The women's 68 kg competition at the 2026 European Karate Championships was held on 20 and 23 May 2026.

== Results ==
=== Finals ===
Semifinals
(Spain) María Nieto	5
(Croatia) Sadea Bećirović	6
(Ukraine) Elina Sieliemienieva	0
(France) Thalya Sombé	4

Final
(Croatia) Sadea Bećirović	4
(France) Thalya Sombé	1

=== Repechage ===
Repechage 1
(North Macedonia) Era Koxha	9
(Austria) Hanna Devigili	8

Repechage 2
(North Macedonia) Era Koxha	0
(Azerbaijan) Irina Zaretska	4

Bronze medal
(Azerbaijan) Irina Zaretska	6
(Spain) María Nieto	1

Repechage
(Slovakia) Sára Krivdová	0
(Germany) Hannah Riedel	1

Bronze medal
(Germany) Hannah Riedel	3
(Ukraine) Elina Sieliemienieva	4

=== Top half ===
==== Section 1 ====
Round of 32
(Kosovo) Vlera Qerimi	2
(Sweden) Viktoria Kraljevic	0
(Spain) María Nieto	5
(Cyprus) Athena Prigkipa	0
(Denmark) Line Zacho Knudsen	2
(Scotland) Kori Fital	1
(Portugal) Eva Flores
(Switzerland) Elena Quirici

Round of 16
(Kosovo) Vlera Qerimi	1
(Spain) María Nieto	4
(Denmark) Line Zacho Knudsen	1
(Portugal) Eva Flores	2

Quarterfinals
(Spain) María Nieto	1
(Portugal) Eva Flores	1

==== Section 2 ====
Round of 32
(North Macedonia) Era Koxha	0
(Croatia) Sadea Bećirović	5
(Austria) Hanna Devigili	3
(Serbia) Teodora Krstović	2
(Lithuania) Kamilė Varankinaitė	0
(Armenia) Lena Gyulumyan	6

Round of 16
(Croatia) Sadea Bećirović	2
(Austria) Hanna Devigili	1
(Armenia) Lena Gyulumyan	5
(Azerbaijan) Irina Zaretska	9

Quarterfinals
(Croatia) Sadea Bećirović	4
(Azerbaijan) Irina Zaretska	2

=== Bottom half ===
==== Section 3 ====
Round of 32
Aleksandra Meshkova	5
(Turkey) Elif Güneş	1
(Romania) Briana Mănică	1
(Slovenia) Elizabeta Molnar	0
(Montenegro) Mariam Zahrane	0
(Netherlands) Lynn Snel	4
(Hungary) Panna Bogdán	0
(Ukraine) Elina Sieliemienieva	1

Round of 16
Aleksandra Meshkova	3
(Romania) Briana Mănică	0
(Netherlands) Lynn Snel	0
(Ukraine) Elina Sieliemienieva	8

Quarterfinals
Aleksandra Meshkova	1
(Ukraine) Elina Sieliemienieva	6

==== Section 4 ====
Round of 32
(Italy) Silvia Semeraro	2
(England) Rebecca Marshall	1
(Greece) Eirini-Grigoria Katsika	0
(Germany) Hannah Riedel	4
(Slovakia) Sára Krivdová	2
(Bosnia and Herzegovina) Amina Fejzić	0

Round of 16
(Italy) Silvia Semeraro	2
(Germany) Hannah Riedel	4
(Slovakia) Sára Krivdová	2
(France) Thalya Sombé	3

Quarterfinals
(Germany) Hannah Riedel	0
(France) Thalya Sombé	5
