= 2018 World University Karate Championships =

- Host city: Kobe, Japan
- Organiser: FISU
- Nations: 31
- Athletes: 229
- Dates: 19–22 July

The 2018 World University Karate Championships was the 11th edition of World University Karate Championships and took place in Kobe, Japan between July 19 and July 22, 2018.

== Participating nations ==
- Australia
- Austria
- China
- Czech Republic
- Spain
- France
- Germany
- Iran
- Italy
- Japan
- Kosovo
- Saudi Arabia
- Luxembourg
- Malaysia
- Poland
- Chinese Taipei
- Turkey
- United States

== Medalists ==
=== Men ===
Event	Gold	Silver	Bronze
Individual kata	Yuhei Horiba Japan	Abolfazl Shahrjerdi Iran	Emre Vefa Göktaş Turkey
Individual kata	Yuhei Horiba Japan	Abolfazl Shahrjerdi Iran	Mattia Busato Italy
Team kata	Japan Kaito Fujita Takaya Fukuda Ryuji Moto	Austria Vincent Forster Lukas Buchinger Christoph Buchinger	Poland Maksymilian Szczypkowski Aleksander Adamow Jan Sieradzki
Team kata	Japan Kaito Fujita Takaya Fukuda Ryuji Moto	Austria Vincent Forster Lukas Buchinger Christoph Buchinger	Iran Abolfazl Shahrjerdi Milad Delikhoun Ali Zand
Kumite −60 kg	Eray Samdan Turkey	Saud Albasher Saudi Arabia	Ali Meskini Iran
Kumite −60 kg	Eray Samdan Turkey	Saud Albasher Saudi Arabia	Kajith Kanagasingam France
Kumite −67 kg	Francesco D'Onofrio Italy	Soichiro Nakano Japan	Mehdi Rahimi Nejad Iran
Kumite −67 kg	Francesco D'Onofrio Italy	Soichiro Nakano Japan	Raul Cuerva Mora Spain
Kumite −75 kg	Yusei Sakiyama Japan	Lou Lebrun France	Ammed Ezzat Momy ElSharaby Italy
Kumite −75 kg	Yusei Sakiyama Japan	Lou Lebrun France	Luca Rettenbacher Austria
Kumite −84 kg	Kamran Madani United States	Durham Mitchell Australia	Faraj Alnashri Saudi Arabia
Kumite −84 kg	Kamran Madani United States	Durham Mitchell Australia	Alvin Karaqi Kosovo
Kumite +84 kg	Saleh Abazari Iran	Daiki Ando Japan	Dnylson Jacquet France
Kumite +84 kg	Saleh Abazari Iran	Daiki Ando Japan	Somanroy M Arulveeran Malaysia
Team kumite	Japan Rikito Shimada Daiki Ando Hyoki Tachibana Yusei Sakiyama Soichiro Nakano Yugo Kozaki Koki Kamaguchi	Iran Younes Noroozi Mahdi Ghararizadeh Mahani Mohamadmahdi Ghaheri Sharghi Saleh Abazari Mehdi Khodabakhshi Milad Bahmani Mehdi Rahimi Nejad Dahka	Saudi Arabia Saud Albasher Abdulaziz Alhakami Faraj Alnashri Bader Alotaibi Raef Al-Turkistani Sultan Alzahrani Tareg Hamedi
Team kumite	Japan Rikito Shimada Daiki Ando Hyoki Tachibana Yusei Sakiyama Soichiro Nakano Yugo Kozaki Koki Kamaguchi	Iran Younes Noroozi Mahdi Ghararizadeh Mahani Mohamadmahdi Ghaheri Sharghi Saleh Abazari Mehdi Khodabakhshi Milad Bahmani Mehdi Rahimi Nejad Dahka	France Faadel Boussag Dnylson Jacquet Kajith Kanagasingam Thanh-Liêm Lê Lou Lebrun Nicolas Nirde Alexis Raspilair

=== Women ===
Event	Gold	Silver	Bronze
Individual kata	Natsuki Shimizu Japan	Terryana D'Onofrio Italy	Marta García Lozano Spain
Individual kata	Natsuki Shimizu Japan	Terryana D'Onofrio Italy	Laetitia Feracci France
Team kata	Japan Natsuki Shimizu Azuki Ogawa Yui Umekage	Spain Marta García Lozano Jessica Moreno Wilkinson Marta Vega Letamendi	Czech Republic Simona Forstová Barbora Kočtářová Sabina Forstová
Team kata	Japan Natsuki Shimizu Azuki Ogawa Yui Umekage	Spain Marta García Lozano Jessica Moreno Wilkinson Marta Vega Letamendi	China Qiao Yan Jialing Li Shuying Li
Kumite −50 kg	Miho Miyahara Japan	Gu Shiau-shuang Chinese Taipei	Faezeh Chizari Iran
Kumite −50 kg	Miho Miyahara Japan	Gu Shiau-shuang Chinese Taipei	Gema Morales Ozuna Spain
Kumite −55 kg	Katayama Haname Japan	Avishan Bagheri Iran	Sara Heurtault France
Kumite −55 kg	Katayama Haname Japan	Avishan Bagheri Iran	Jennifer Warling Luxembourg
Kumite −61 kg	Yuki Kujuro Japan	Melika Ahadi Iran	Coral Herrador Sánchez Spain
Kumite −61 kg	Yuki Kujuro Japan	Melika Ahadi Iran	Wei-Ning Hsu Chinese Taipei
Kumite −68 kg	Kanako Oryu Japan	Laura Sivert France	Maria Isabel Nieto Mejias Spain
Kumite −68 kg	Kanako Oryu Japan	Laura Sivert France	Behnoosh Najafi Ghaghelestani Iran
Kumite +68 kg	Rosa Marie Liebold Germany	Tzu-Hsuan Wen Chinese Taipei	Lora Ziller Austria
Kumite +68 kg	Rosa Marie Liebold Germany	Tzu-Hsuan Wen Chinese Taipei	Ayaka Saito Japan
Team kumite	France Andrea Brito Sara Heurtault Zoulikha Meghiche Laura Sivert	Spain Carlota Fernández Osorio Coral Herrador Sánchez Gema Morales Ozuna María Isabel Nieto Mejías	Austria Lara Hinterseer Lora Ziller Mariam Elaswad Kristin Isabelle Wieninger
Team kumite	France Andrea Brito Sara Heurtault Zoulikha Meghiche Laura Sivert	Spain Carlota Fernández Osorio Coral Herrador Sánchez Gema Morales Ozuna María Isabel Nieto Mejías	Japan Kanako Oryu Yuki Kujuro Haname Katayama Ayaka Saito

== Medal count table ==
2018 World University Karate Championships
Pos	Country	Gold	Silver	Bronze	Total
1	Japan	10	2	2	14
2	Iran	1	4	5	10
3	France	1	2	5	8
4	Italy	1	1	2	4
5	Turkey	1	0	1	2
6	Germany	1	0	0	1
7	United States	1	0	0	1
8	Spain	0	2	5	7
9	Chinese Taipei	0	2	1	3
10	Austria	0	1	3	4
11	Saudi Arabia	0	1	2	3
12	Australia	0	1	0	1
13	Czech Republic	0	0	1	1
14	Kosovo	0	0	1	1
15	Luxembourg	0	0	1	1
16	China	0	0	1	1
17	Malaysia	0	0	1	1
18	Poland	0	0	1	1
	Total	16	16	32	64

== See also ==
- World University Championships
