= 2025 European Karate Championships – Women's 68 kg =

European Karate Championship

Women's 68 kg at the 2025 European Karate Championships
- Venue: Karen Demirchyan Sports Complex
- Location: Yerevan, Armenia
- Dates: 8, 10 May
- Competitors: 31 from 29 nations

Medalists
gold medal	Hannah Riedel	Germany
silver medal	María Nieto	Spain
bronze medal	Elina Sieliemienieva	Ukraine
bronze medal	Elena Quirici	Switzerland

The women's 68 kg competition at the 2025 European Karate Championships was held on 8 and 10 May 2025.

== Results ==
=== Finals ===
Semifinals
(Spain) María Nieto	4
(Italy) Silvia Semeraro	1
(Germany) Hannah Riedel	1
(Switzerland) Elena Quirici	1

Final
(Spain) María Nieto	0
(Germany) Hannah Riedel	2

=== Repechage ===
Repechage 1
(Georgia (country)) Lika Pirtskhalava	0
(Ukraine) Elina Sieliemienieva	5

Repechage 2
(Ukraine) Elina Sieliemienieva	9
(Austria) Hanna Devigili	0

Bronze medal
(Ukraine) Elina Sieliemienieva	2
(Italy) Silvia Semeraro	0

Repechage 1
(Serbia) Dunja Rajić	3
(North Macedonia) Angela Mojsovska	4

Repechage 2
(North Macedonia) Angela Mojsovska	1
(Croatia) Sadea Bećirović	5

Bronze medal
(Croatia) Sadea Bećirović	0
(Switzerland) Elena Quirici	0

=== Top half ===
==== Section 1 ====
Round of 32
(Romania) Antonia Mănică	1
(Finland) Kiia Koponen	6
(Hungary) Alexandra Ádám	1
(Austria) Hanna Devigili	4
(Montenegro) Jovana Stojanović	0
(Ukraine) Elina Sieliemienieva	9
(Georgia (country)) Lika Pirtskhalava	0
(Spain) María Nieto	7

Round of 16
(Finland) Kiia Koponen	5
(Austria) Hanna Devigili	8
(Ukraine) Elina Sieliemienieva	3
(Spain) María Nieto	3

Quarterfinals
(Austria) Hanna Devigili	5
(Spain) María Nieto	7

==== Section 2 ====
Round of 32
(Belgium) Nesrine Bougrine	1
(Bosnia and Herzegovina) Ilma Rahmanović	5
(Turkey) Eda Eltemur	5
(Malta) Amy Cunningham	0
(Italy) Silvia Semeraro	5
(Denmark) Line Zacho Knudsen	2
(Poland) Wiktoria Grejner	0
(France) Thalya Sombé	8

Round of 16
(Bosnia and Herzegovina) Ilma Rahmanović	4
(Turkey) Eda Eltemur	3
(Italy) Silvia Semeraro	2
(France) Thalya Sombé	0

Quarterfinals
(Bosnia and Herzegovina) Ilma Rahmanović	0
(Italy) Silvia Semeraro	2

=== Bottom half ===
==== Section 3 ====
Round of 32
(Slovakia) Sára Krivdová	7
(Slovenia) Elizabeta Molnar	1
(Croatia) Sadea Bećirović	4
(Netherlands) Lynn Snel	3
(Kosovo) Vlera Qerimi	1
(North Macedonia) Angela Mojsovska	2
(Serbia) Dunja Rajić	0
(Germany) Hannah Riedel	1

Round of 16
(Slovakia) Sára Krivdová	2
(Croatia) Sadea Bećirović	2
(North Macedonia) Angela Mojsovska	0
(Germany) Hannah Riedel	2

Quarterfinals
(Croatia) Sadea Bećirović	1
(Germany) Hannah Riedel	3

==== Section 4 ====
Round of 32
(Armenia) Lena Gyulumyan	0
(Scotland) Kori Fital	8
Volha Ramaniuk	3
(Greece) Konstantina Peppa	1
Aleksandra Meshkova	4
(England) Lauren Salisbury	0

Round of 16
(Scotland) Kori Fital	3
Volha Ramaniuk	2
Aleksandra Meshkova	0
(Switzerland) Elena Quirici	4

Quarterfinals
(Scotland) Kori Fital	0
(Switzerland) Elena Quirici	1
