= Karate at the 2025 World Games – Women's kumite 68 kg =

Women's kumite 68 kg at the 2025 World Games
- Venue: Jianyang Cultural and Sports Centre Gymnasium
- Location: Chengdu, China
- Dates: 9 August
- Competitors: 8 from 8 nations

Medalists
gold medal	Elena Quirici	Switzerland
silver medal	Irina Zaretska	Azerbaijan
bronze medal	Tsubasa Kama	Japan

The women's kumite 68 kg competition in karate at the 2025 World Games took place on 9 August 2025 at the Jianyang Cultural and Sports Centre Gymnasium in Chengdu, China.

== Results ==
=== Pool round ===
==== Pool A ====
Pos	Athlete	B	W	D	D^{0}	L	Pts	Score	(Azerbaijan)	(Egypt)	(Indonesia)	(China)
1	Irina Zaretska (AZE)	3	3	0	0	0	9	14–1	—	3–0	10–0	2–1
2	Hadir Hendy (EGY)	3	1	0	0	2	3 (Note: Hendy (EGY) 1–1, Zefanya (INA) 1–1, Li (CHN) 1–1. Scores obtained: Hendy 9, Li 6, Zefanya 5. Zefanya 4–2 Li.)	9–6	0–2	—	9–1	0–3
3	Ceyco Georgia Zefanya (INA)	3	1	0	0	2	3	5–21	0–10	1–9	—	4–2
4	Li Qiaoqiao (CHN)	3	1	0	0	2	3	6–6	1–2	3–0	2–4	—

Source: Chengdu 2025

==== Pool B ====
Pos	Athlete	B	W	D	D^{0}	L	Pts	Score	(Switzerland)	(Japan)	(France)	(Turkey)
1	Elena Quirici (SUI)	3	3	0	0	0	9	13–4	—	3–2	4–0	6–0
2	Tsubasa Kama (JPN)	3	2	0	0	1	6	12–6	2–3	—	4–1	6–2
3	Thalya Sombe (FRA)	3	1	0	0	2	3	6–12	0–4	1–4	—	5–4
4	Eda Eltemur (TUR)	3	0	0	0	3	0	8–17	0–6	2–6	4–5	—

Source: Chengdu 2025

=== Finals ===
Semi-finals
Tsubasa Kama (JPN)	3
Irina Zaretska (AZE)	11
Hadir Hendy (EGY)	0
Elena Quirici (SUI)	1

Gold medal bout
Irina Zaretska (AZE)	0
Elena Quirici (SUI)	3
Bronze medal bout
Tsubasa Kama (JPN)	DSQ
Hadir Hendy (EGY)
