= 2023 World Karate Championships – Women's 68 kg =

Women's kumite 68 kg at the 2023 World Karate Championships
- Venue: László Papp Budapest Sports Arena
- Location: Budapest, Hungary
- Dates: 24, 28 October
- Competitors: 54 from 54 nations

Medalists
gold medal	Irina Zaretska	Azerbaijan
silver medal	Elena Quirici	Switzerland
bronze medal	Alizée Agier	France
bronze medal	Ceyco Georgia Zefanya	Indonesia

The women's kumite 68 kg competition at the 2023 World Karate Championships was held on 24 and 28 October 2023.

== Results ==
=== Finals ===
Semifinals
(France) Alizée Agier	0
(Switzerland) Elena Quirici	1
(Indonesia) Ceyco Georgia Zefanya	5
(Azerbaijan) Irina Zaretska	5

Final
(Switzerland) Elena Quirici	4
(Azerbaijan) Irina Zaretska	5

=== Repechage ===
Repechage 1
(Slovenia) Elizabeta Molnar	1
(Venezuela) Marianth Cuervo	6

Repechage 2
(Venezuela) Marianth Cuervo	0
(Spain) María Nieto	1

Bronze medal
(Spain) María Nieto	0
(France) Alizée Agier	5

Repechage 1
(Germany) Madeleine Schröter	5
(Austria) Marina Vukovic	3

Repechage 2
(Germany) Madeleine Schröter	3
(United States) Skylar Lingl	2

Bronze medal
(Germany) Madeleine Schröter	0
(Indonesia) Ceyco Georgia Zefanya	4

=== Top half ===
==== Section 1 ====
First round
(Morocco) Nissrine Brouk	3
(Norway) Annika Sælid	2
(Denmark) Line Zacho Knudsen	3
(Ukraine) Juliet McLachlan	1
(England) Lauren Salisbury	2
(Croatia) Sadea Bećirović	6
(Greece) Konstantina Peppa	0
(France) Alizée Agier	3
(Brazil) Bárbara Rodrigues	1
(Turkey) Sudenur Aksoy	3
(Poland) Wiktoria Grejner	3
(Kosovo) Vlera Qerimi	1

Second round
(Morocco) Nissrine Brouk	6
(Denmark) Line Zacho Knudsen	1
(Croatia) Sadea Bećirović	4
(Japan) Tsubasa Kama	3
(France) Alizée Agier	3
(Turkey) Sudenur Aksoy	0
(Poland) Wiktoria Grejner	0
(Italy) Silvia Semeraro	0

Third round
(Morocco) Nissrine Brouk	4
(Croatia) Sadea Bećirović	2
(France) Alizée Agier	1
(Italy) Silvia Semeraro	1

Quarterfinals
(Morocco) Nissrine Brouk	1
(France) Alizée Agier	9

==== Section 2 ====
First round
(Spain) María Nieto	2
(Australia) Yap Pui Mun	0
(Serbia) Tamara Živković	2
(Iran) Mobina Heydari	6
(Hong Kong) Wong Cheuk Lee	2
(Republic of Ireland) Catlin Kelly	0
(Uzbekistan) Bonu Egamberdieva	1
(Venezuela) Marianth Cuervo	4
(Algeria) Karima Mekkaoui	3
(Slovenia) Elizabeta Molnar	4

Second round
(Spain) María Nieto	6
(Iran) Mobina Heydari	4
(Hong Kong) Wong Cheuk Lee	1
(Ukraine) Halyna Melnyk	3
(Venezuela) Marianth Cuervo	4
Anna Kudriavtseva	1
(Slovenia) Elizabeta Molnar	0
(Switzerland) Elena Quirici	1

Third round
(Spain) María Nieto	5
(Ukraine) Halyna Melnyk	0
(Venezuela) Marianth Cuervo	1
(Switzerland) Elena Quirici	2

Quarterfinals
(Spain) María Nieto	3
(Switzerland) Elena Quirici	3

=== Bottom half ===
==== Section 3 ====
First round
(Egypt) Ola El-Medany	1
(Slovakia) Sára Krivdová	2
(Chile) Ignacia Morales	9
Paria Eizadyari	6
(Romania) Dana Teodorescu	0
(Bosnia and Herzegovina) Ivona Ćavar	1
(Montenegro) Vasilisa Bujić	3
(Netherlands) Robin van Wezel	5
(Senegal) Magatte Seck	1
(Canada) Hilary Pond	0
(United Arab Emirates) Fatma Khasaif	3
(India) Niharika Kaurav	0

Second round
(Slovakia) Sára Krivdová	2
(Chile) Ignacia Morales	1
(Bosnia and Herzegovina) Ivona Ćavar	1
(Indonesia) Ceyco Georgia Zefanya	2
(Netherlands) Robin van Wezel	3
(Senegal) Magatte Seck	1
(United Arab Emirates) Fatma Khasaif	0
(Kazakhstan) Laura Alikul	1

Third round
(Slovakia) Sára Krivdová	0
(Indonesia) Ceyco Georgia Zefanya	3
(Netherlands) Robin van Wezel	1
(Kazakhstan) Laura Alikul	4

Quarterfinals
(Indonesia) Ceyco Georgia Zefanya	4
(Kazakhstan) Laura Alikul	0

==== Section 4 ====
First round
(North Macedonia) Angela Mojsovska	3
(Hungary) Dorottya Pap	1
(Belgium) Nesrine Bougrine	2
(China) Li Qiaoqiao	3
(Armenia) Anita Makyan	4
(Mexico) Paola Rubio	1
(Colombia) Lina Puche	4
(Austria) Marina Vukovic	6
(Germany) Madeleine Schröter	3
(Tunisia) Wissal Ezzar	0

Second round
(North Macedonia) Angela Mojsovska	3
(China) Li Qiaoqiao	4
(Armenia) Anita Makyan	0
(United States) Skylar Lingl	5
(Austria) Marina Vukovic	2
(Kenya) Joyce Akinyi	4
(Germany) Madeleine Schröter	1
(Azerbaijan) Irina Zaretska	6

Third round
(China) Li Qiaoqiao	0
(United States) Skylar Lingl	1
(Austria) Marina Vukovic	0
(Azerbaijan) Irina Zaretska	6

Quarterfinals
(United States) Skylar Lingl	2
(Azerbaijan) Irina Zaretska	3
