= 2024 European Karate Championships – Women's 68 kg =

European Karate Championship

Women's 68 kg at the 2024 European Karate Championships
- Venue: Krešimir Ćosić Hall
- Location: Zadar, Croatia
- Dates: 10–11 May
- Nations: 29
- Teams: 29

Medalists
gold medal	Alizée Agier	France
silver medal	Elena Quirici	Switzerland
bronze medal	María Nieto	Spain
bronze medal	Elina Sieliemienieva	Ukraine

The women's 68 kg competition at the 2024 European Karate Championships was held from 10 to 11 May 2024.

== Results ==
=== Final ===
Final
Alizée Agier (FRA)	6
Elena Quirici (SUI)	2

=== Top half ===
Round of 32
Renata Arabli (AZE)	5
Pamela Bodei (ITA)	10
Wiktoria Grejner (POL)	0
Lea Vukoja (CRO)	4
Ema Tinavská (CZE)	1
Eda Eltemur (TUR)	4
Vasilisa Bujić (MNE)	1
María Nieto (ESP)	3
Line Knudsen (DEN)	0
Angela Mojsovska (MKD)	2
Vlera Qerimi (KOS)	4
Sára Krivdová (SVK)	0
Maryia Aliakseyeva (ANA)	8
Stavroula Oreopoulou (GRE)	0

Round of 16
Pamela Bodei (ITA)	2
Lea Vukoja (CRO)	3
Eda Eltemur (TUR)	0
María Nieto (ESP)	0
Angela Mojsovska (MKD)	2
Vlera Qerimi (KOS)	2
Maryia Aliakseyeva (ANA)	2
Alizée Agier (FRA)	10

Quarterfinals
Lea Vukoja (CRO)	4
María Nieto (ESP)	5
Vlera Qerimi (KOS)	0
Alizée Agier (FRA)	2

Semifinals
María Nieto (ESP)	2
Alizée Agier (FRA)	6

=== Bottom half ===
Round of 32
Lauren Salisbury (ENG)	0
Elina Sieliemienieva (UKR)	8
Elizabeta Molnar (SLO)	8
Briana Mănică (ROU)	0
Caitlin Kelly (IRL)	9
Ashleigh Harris (WAL)	4
Nesrine Bougrine (BEL)	0
Ilma Rahmanović (BIH)	1
Marina Vuković (AUT)	6
Ludmilla Popelisko (LAT)	4
Tamara Živković (SRB)	2
Robin van Wezel (NED)	3

Round of 16
Elina Sieliemienieva (UKR)	3
Elizabeta Molnar (SLO)	2
Caitlin Kelly (IRL)	1
Madeleine Schröter (GER)	2
Ilma Rahmanović (BIH)	5
Marina Vuković (AUT)	0
Robin van Wezel (NED)	1
Elena Quirici (SUI)	2

Quarterfinals
Elina Sieliemienieva (UKR)	3
Madeleine Schröter (GER)	1
Ilma Rahmanović (BIH)	0
Elena Quirici (SUI)	4

Semifinals
Elina Sieliemienieva (UKR)	0
Elena Quirici (SUI)	1

=== Repechage ===
Repechage round 1
Maryia Aliakseyeva (ANA)	3
Vlera Qerimi (KOS)	7
Robin van Wezel (NED)	4
Ilma Rahmanović (BIH)	5

Bronze medal match
María Nieto (ESP)	3
Vlera Qerimi (KOS)	1
Elina Sieliemienieva (UKR)	3
Ilma Rahmanović (BIH)	0
