= Karate at the 2022 World Games – Women's kumite 68 kg =

Women's kumite 68 kg at the 2022 World Games
- Venue: Bill Battle Coliseum
- Location: Birmingham, United States
- Dates: 9 July
- Competitors: 8 from 8 nations

Medalists
gold medal	Silvia Semeraro	Italy
silver medal	Alisa Buchinger	Austria
bronze medal	Alizée Agier	France

The women's kumite 68 kg competition in karate at the 2022 World Games took place on 9 July 2022 at the Bill Battle Coliseum in Birmingham, United States.

== Results ==
=== Elimination round ===
==== Pool A ====
Pos	Athlete	B	W	D	L	Pts	Score	(France)	(Azerbaijan)	(Switzerland)	(Ukraine)
1	Alizée Agier (FRA)	3	2	1	0	5	13–7	—	7–4	3–0	3–3
2	Irina Zaretska (AZE)	3	2	0	1	4	18–9	4–7	—	9–1	5–1
3	Elena Quirici (SUI)	3	1	0	2	2	6–13	0–3	1–9	—	5–1
4	Halyna Melnyk (UKR)	3	0	1	2	1	5–13	3–3	1–5	1–5	—

Source: Birmingham 2022

==== Pool B ====
Pos	Athlete	B	W	D	L	Pts	Score	(Italy)	(Austria)	(United States)	(Canada)
1	Silvia Semeraro (ITA)	3	3	0	0	6	11–2	—	4–2	3–0	4–0
2	Alisa Buchinger (AUT)	3	2	0	1	4	6–4	2–4	—	2–0	2–0
3	Skylar Lingl (USA)	3	1	0	2	2	3–7	0–3	0–2	—	3–2
4	Melissa Bratic (CAN)	3	0	0	3	0	2–9	0–4	0–2	2–3	—

Source: Birmingham 2022

=== Finals ===
Semi-finals
Alizée Agier (FRA)	0
Alisa Buchinger (AUT)	1
Silvia Semeraro (ITA)	3
Irina Zaretska (AZE)	1

Gold medal bout
Alisa Buchinger (AUT)	1
Silvia Semeraro (ITA)	4
Bronze medal bout
Alizée Agier (FRA)	8
Irina Zaretska (AZE)	4
