= Alizée Agier =

French karateka (born 1994)

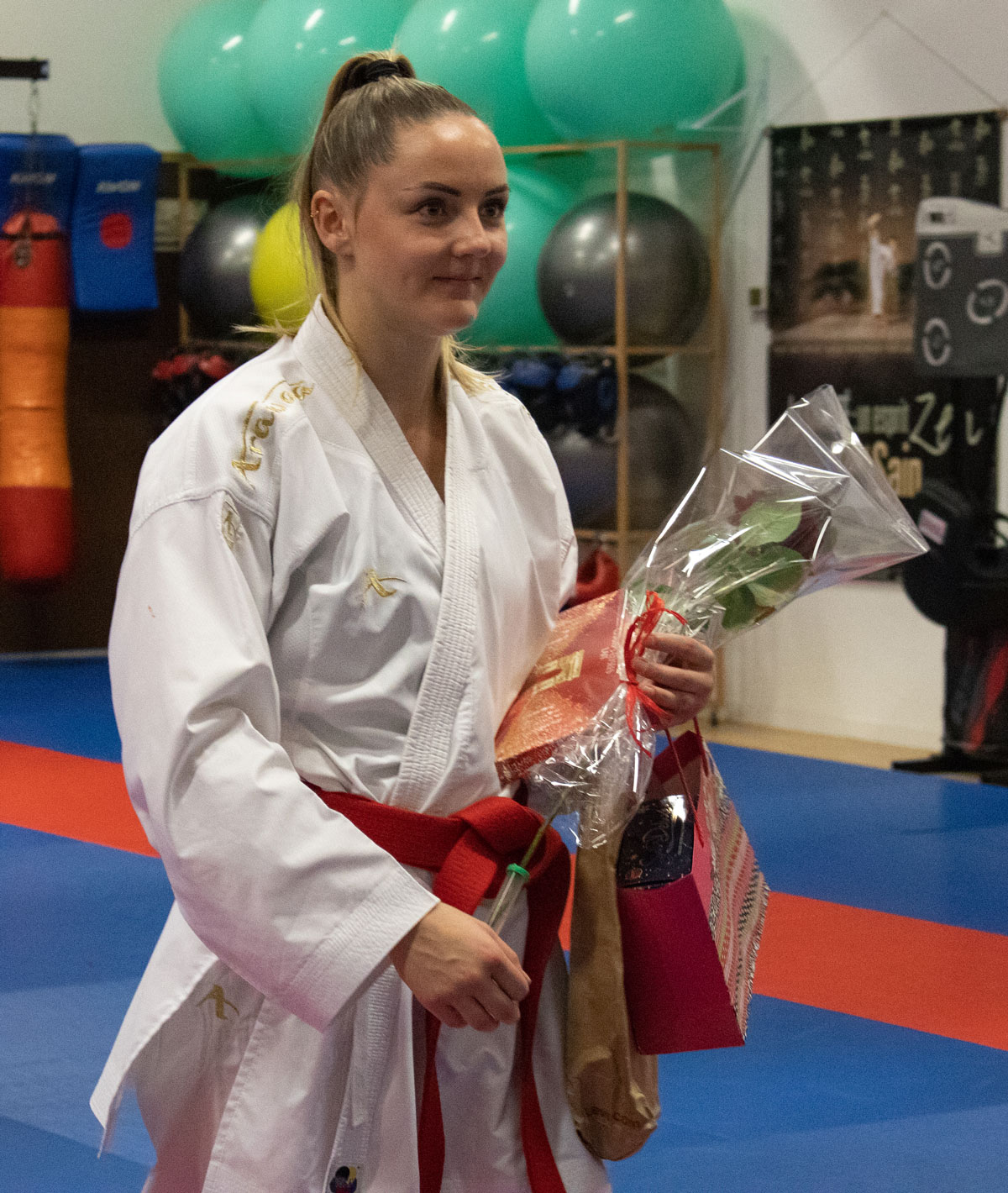
- Agier in 2019

Personal information
- Born: 7 July 1994 (age 32) Semur-en-Auxois, France

Sport
- Country: France
- Sport: Karate
- Weight class: 68 kg
- Events: Kumite; Team kumite
Medal record
Women's karate
Representing France
| Event | 1st | 2nd | 3rd |
|---|---|---|---|
| World Championships | 2 | 1 | 2 |
| World Games | 0 | 0 | 1 |
| European Championships | 2 | 1 | 6 |
| European Games | 0 | 0 | 1 |
| Mediterranean Games | 0 | 0 | 1 |
| Total | 4 | 2 | 11 |
World Championships
| Gold medal – first place | 2014 Bremen | Kumite 68 kg |
| Gold medal – first place | 2016 Linz | Team kumite |
| Silver medal – second place | 2021 Dubai | Team kumite |
| Bronze medal – third place | 2021 Dubai | Kumite 68 kg |
| Bronze medal – third place | 2023 Budapest | Kumite 68 kg |
World Games
| Bronze medal – third place | 2022 Birmingham | Kumite 68 kg |
European Championships
| Gold medal – first place | 2019 Guadalajara | Kumite 68 kg |
| Gold medal – first place | 2024 Zadar | Kumite 68 kg |
| Silver medal – second place | 2017 Kocaeli | Kumite 68 kg |
| Bronze medal – third place | 2016 Montpellier | Team kumite |
| Bronze medal – third place | 2017 Kocaeli | Team kumite |
| Bronze medal – third place | 2022 Gaziantep | Kumite 68 kg |
| Bronze medal – third place | 2022 Gaziantep | Team kumite |
| Bronze medal – third place | 2023 Guadalajara | Team kumite |
| Bronze medal – third place | 2024 Zadar | Team kumite |
European Games
| Bronze medal – third place | 2023 Kraków-Małopolska | Kumite 68 kg |
Mediterranean Games
| Bronze medal – third place | 2013 Mersin | Kumite 68 kg |

Alizée Agier (born 7 July 1994) is a French karateka. She won the gold medal in the women's kumite 68 kg event at the 2014 World Karate Championships held in Bremen, Germany. She also won the gold medal in this event at the 2019 European Karate Championships held in Guadalajara, Spain.

== Career ==
Agier won one of the bronze medals in the women's kumite 68 kg event at the 2013 Mediterranean Games held in Mersin, Turkey. She won the gold medal in her event at the 2014 World Karate Championships held in Bremen, Germany. She defeated Gitte Brunstad of Norway in her gold medal match.

In 2016, Agier won a medal in the women's team kumite event at the European Karate Championships in Montpellier, France and the World Karate Championships in Linz, Austria. She won one of the bronze medals in this event at the 2016 European Karate Championships and the gold medal in this event at the 2016 World Karate Championships. Agier also won the gold medal in the women's 68 kg event at the 2016 World University Karate Championships held in Braga, Portugal. She won the silver medal in the women's kumite 68 kg event at the 2017 European Karate Championships held in İzmit, Turkey. She also won one of the bronze medals in the women's team kumite event.

Agier won the gold medal in the women's kumite 68 kg event at the 2019 European Karate Championships held in Guadalajara, Spain. In the same year, she competed in the women's kumite 68 kg event at the European Games held in Minsk, Belarus. She won one of three matches in the elimination round and she did not advance to compete in the semi-finals.

In June 2021, Agier competed at the World Olympic Qualification Tournament held in Paris, France hoping to qualify for the 2020 Summer Olympics in Tokyo, Japan. In November 2021, she won one of the bronze medals in the women's 68 kg event at the World Karate Championships held in Dubai, United Arab Emirates. She also won the silver medal in the women's team kumite event.

Agier won one of the bronze medals in the women's 68 kg event at the 2022 European Karate Championships held in Gaziantep, Turkey. She also won one of the bronze medals in the women's team kumite event. Agier won the bronze medal in the women's 68 kg event at the 2022 World Games held in Birmingham, United States. She defeated Irina Zaretska of Azerbaijan in her bronze medal match. She was also flag bearer for France during the opening ceremony of the 2022 World Games.

Agier won one of the bronze medals in the women's team kumite event at the 2023 European Karate Championships held in Guadalajara, Spain. She lost her bronze medal match in the women's 68 kg event. A few months later, Agier won one of the bronze medals in the women's 68 kg event at the 2023 European Games held in Poland. In the same year, she won one of the bronze medals in the women's 68 kg event at the 2023 World Karate Championships held in Budapest, Hungary. She defeated María Nieto of Spain in her bronze medal match.

She won the gold medal in the women's 68 kg event at the 2024 European Karate Championships held in Zadar, Croatia. She also won one of the bronze medals in the women's team kumite event.

== Personal life ==
She was diagnosed at age 19 with type 1 diabetes.

== Achievements ==
| Year | Competition | Venue | Rank | Event |
|---|---|---|---|---|
| 2013 | Mediterranean Games | Mersin, Turkey | 3rd | Kumite 68 kg |
| 2014 | World Championships | Bremen, Germany | 1st | Kumite 68 kg |
| 2016 | European Championships | Montpellier, France | 3rd | Team kumite |
| 2016 | World Championships | Linz, Austria | 1st | Team kumite |
| 2017 | European Championships | İzmit, Turkey | 2nd | Kumite 68 kg |
| 2017 | European Championships | İzmit, Turkey | 3rd | Team kumite |
| 2019 | European Championships | Guadalajara, Spain | 1st | Kumite 68 kg |
| 2021 | World Championships | Dubai, United Arab Emirates | 3rd | Kumite 68 kg |
| 2021 | World Championships | Dubai, United Arab Emirates | 2nd | Team kumite |
| 2022 | European Championships | Gaziantep, Turkey | 3rd | Kumite 68 kg |
| 2022 | European Championships | Gaziantep, Turkey | 3rd | Team kumite |
| 2022 | World Games | Birmingham, United States | 3rd | Kumite 68 kg |
| 2023 | European Championships | Guadalajara, Spain | 3rd | Team kumite |
| 2023 | European Games | Kraków and Małopolska, Poland | 3rd | Kumite 68 kg |
| 2023 | World Championships | Budapest, Hungary | 3rd | Kumite 68 kg |
| 2024 | European Championships | Zadar, Croatia | 1st | Kumite 68 kg |
| 2024 | European Championships | Zadar, Croatia | 3rd | Team kumite |
