= Karate at the 2023 European Games – Women's kumite 68 kg =

Women's kumite 68 kg at the 2023 European Games
- Venue: Bielsko-Biała Arena
- Date: 23 June
- Competitors: 8 from 8 nations

Medalists
gold medal	Irina Zaretska	Azerbaijan
silver medal	Elena Quirici	Switzerland
bronze medal	Anita Makyan	Armenia
bronze medal	Alizée Agier	France

The women's kumite 68 kg competition at the 2023 European Games was held on 23 June 2023 at the Bielsko-Biała Arena.

== Results ==
=== Elimination round ===
Pool A

Pos	Athlete	B	W	D	D^{0}	L	Pts	Score	(Switzerland)	(France)	(Italy)	(Poland)
1	Elena Quirici (SUI)	3	3	0	0	0	9	14–1	—	4–0	4–0	6–1
2	Alizée Agier (FRA)	3	2	0	0	1	6	10–8	0–4	—	8–4	2–0
3	Pamela Bodei (ITA)	3	1	0	0	2	3	8–15	0–4	4–8	—	4–3
4	Wiktoria Grejner (POL)	3	0	0	0	3	0	4–12	1–6	0–2	3–4	—

Source: EG2023

Pool B

Pos	Athlete	B	W	D	D^{0}	L	Pts	Score	(Azerbaijan)	(Armenia)	(Spain)	(Ukraine)
1	Irina Zaretska (AZE)	3	3	0	0	0	9	17–3	—	8–0	4–3	5–0
2	Anita Makyan (ARM)	3	2	0	0	1	6	7–12	0–8	—	4–4	3–0
3	María Nieto (ESP)	3	1	0	0	2	3	11–12	3–4	4–4	—	4–4
4	Halyna Melnyk (UKR)	3	0	0	0	3	0	4–12	0–5	0–3	4–4	—

Source: EG2023

=== Finals ===
Semifinals
Anita Makyan (ARM)	0
Elena Quirici (SUI)	4
Alizée Agier (FRA)	0
Irina Zaretska (AZE)	3

Gold medal bout
Elena Quirici (SUI)	1
Irina Zaretska (AZE)	4
