= María Nieto =

Spanish karateka (born 1999)

Personal information
- Full name: María Isabel Nieto Mejías
- Born: 25 August 1999 (age 26)

Sport
- Country: Spain
- Sport: Karate
- Weight class: 68 kg
- Events: Kumite; Team kumite
Medal record
Women's karate
Representing Spain
World Championships
Gold medal – first place	2023 Budapest	Team kumite
European Championships
Silver medal – second place	2025 Yerevan	Kumite 68 kg
Bronze medal – third place	2022 Gaziantep	Team kumite
Bronze medal – third place	2023 Guadalajara	Kumite 68 kg
Bronze medal – third place	2024 Zadar	Kumite 68 kg

María Isabel Nieto Mejías (born 25 August 1999) is a Spanish karateka. She has won multiple medals at the European Karate Championships. She also won a gold medal at the 2023 World Karate Championships held in Budapest, Hungary.

Nieto competed in the women's 68 kg event at the 2023 European Games held in Poland. She won her match against Halyna Melnyk of Ukraine and she lost her matches against Irina Zaretska of Azerbaijan and Anita Makyan of Armenia. She finished in third place in the elimination round and she did not advance to the semi-finals.

Nieto lost her bronze medal match against Alizée Agier of France in the women's 68 kg event at the 2023 World Karate Championships held in Budapest, Hungary.

== Achievements ==
Year	Competition	Location	Rank	Event
2022	European Championships	Gaziantep, Turkey	3rd	Team kumite
2023	European Championships	Guadalajara, Spain	3rd	Kumite 68 kg
2023	World Championships	Budapest, Hungary	1st	Team kumite
2024	European Championships	Zadar, Croatia	3rd	Kumite 68 kg
2025	European Championships	Yerevan, Armenia	2nd	Kumite 68 kg
