= Karate at the 2015 European Games – Women's kumite 68 kg =

Karate competition

Women's kumite 68 kg at the 2015 European Games
- Venue: Baku Crystal Hall
- Date: 14 June
- Competitors: 8 from 8 nations

Medalists
gold medal	İrina Zaretska	Azerbaijan
silver medal	Alisa Buchinger	Austria
bronze medal	Marina Raković	Montenegro

The Women's kumite 68 kg competition at the 2015 European Games in Baku, Azerbaijan was held on 14 June 2015 at the Crystal Hall.

== Schedule ==
All times are Azerbaijan Summer Time (UTC+5).

Date	Time	Event
Sunday, 14 June 2015	10:00	Elimination Round
Sunday, 14 June 2015	15:30	Semifinals
Sunday, 14 June 2015	17:00	Finals

== Results ==
Legend

- KK — Forfeit (Kiken)

=== Elimination round ===
==== Group A ====
Athlete	Pld	W	D	L	Points		
Athlete	Pld	W	D	L	GF	GA	Diff
Alisa Buchinger (AUT)	3	3	0	0	7	1	+6
Irina Zaretska (AZE)	3	2	0	1	7	5	+2
Vassiliki Panetsidou (GRE)	3	1	0	2	7	6	+1
Cristina Vizcaíno (ESP)	3	0	0	3	4	13	–9

	Score	
Alisa Buchinger (AUT)	2–1	Vassiliki Panetsidou (GRE)
Cristina Vizcaíno (ESP)	1–6	Irina Zaretska (AZE)
Alisa Buchinger (AUT)	4–0	Irina Zaretska (AZE)
Cristina Vizcaíno (ESP)	3–6	Vassiliki Panetsidou (GRE)
Vassiliki Panetsidou (GRE)	0–1	Irina Zaretska (AZE)
Alisa Buchinger (AUT)	1–0	Cristina Vizcaíno (ESP)

==== Group B ====
Athlete	Pld	W	D	L	Points		
Athlete	Pld	W	D	L	GF	GA	Diff
Marina Raković (MNE)	3	2	1	0	3	0	+3
Elena Quirici (SUI)	3	2	0	1	10	1	+9
Hafsa Şeyda Burucu (TUR)	3	1	1	1	10	2	+8
Telma Rut Frímannsdóttir (ISL)	3	0	0	0	1	21	–20

	Score	
Elena Quirici (SUI)	9–0	Telma Rut Frímannsdóttir (ISL)
Marina Raković (MNE)	0–0	Hafsa Şeyda Burucu (TUR)
Elena Quirici (SUI)	1–0	Hafsa Şeyda Burucu (TUR)
Marina Raković (MNE)	2–0	Telma Rut Frímannsdóttir (ISL)
Telma Rut Frímannsdóttir (ISL)	1–10	Hafsa Şeyda Burucu (TUR)
Elena Quirici (SUI)	0–1	Marina Raković (MNE)

== Finals ==
Semifinals
Alisa Buchinger (AUT)	2
Elena Quirici (SUI)	0
İrina Zaretska (AZE)	1
Marina Raković (MNE)	0

Gold medal match
Alisa Buchinger (AUT)	1
İrina Zaretska (AZE)	8
Bronze medal match
Elena Quirici (SUI)	0
Marina Raković (MNE)	4
