= 2022 European Karate Championships – Women's 68 kg =

European Karate Championship

Women's 68 kg at the 2022 European Karate Championships
- Venue: Karataş Şahinbey Sport Hall
- Location: Gaziantep, Turkey
- Dates: 25–28 May
- Competitors: 27 from 27 nations

Medalists
gold medal	Eda Eltemur	Turkey
silver medal	Miroslava Kopúňová	Slovakia
bronze medal	Vasiliki Panetsidou	Greece
bronze medal	Alizée Agier	France

The Women's 68 kg competition at the 2022 European Karate Championships was held from 25 to 28 May 2022.

== Results ==
=== Finals ===
Semifinals
(Slovakia) Miroslava Kopúňová	6
(Greece) Vasiliki Panetsidou	0
(Turkey) Eda Eltemur	0
(France) Alizée Agier	0

Final
(Slovakia) Miroslava Kopúňová	0
(Turkey) Eda Eltemur	2

=== Repechage ===
Repechage
(Armenia) Anita Makyan	3
(North Macedonia) Angela Mojsovska	2

Bronze medal
(Armenia) Anita Makyan	4
(Greece) Vasiliki Panetsidou	7

Repechage
(Slovenia) Kiti Smiljan	1
(Germany) Madeleine Schröter	2

Bronze medal
(Germany) Madeleine Schröter	5
(France) Alizée Agier	5

=== Top half ===
==== Section 1 ====
Round of 32
(Belgium) Nesrine Bougrine	5
(Romania) Miruna Mălăuţă	1
(North Macedonia) Angela Mojsovska	6
(Finland) Elina Lehtonen	0
(Kosovo) Festina Curri	1
(Armenia) Anita Makyan	1

Round of 16
(Belgium) Nesrine Bougrine	1
(North Macedonia) Angela Mojsovska	6
(Armenia) Anita Makyan	0
(Slovakia) Miroslava Kopúňová	3

Quarterfinals
(North Macedonia) Angela Mojsovska	0
(Slovakia) Miroslava Kopúňová	8

==== Section 2 ====
Round of 32
(Montenegro) Vasilisa Bujić	6
(Wales) Kerrie Griffin	0
(Italy) Silvia Semeraro	0
(Austria) Alisa Buchinger	0
(Switzerland) Elena Quirici	5
(Croatia) Sadea Bećirović	2

Round of 16
(Montenegro) Vasilisa Bujić	0
(Italy) Silvia Semeraro	1
(Switzerland) Elena Quirici	1
(Greece) Vasiliki Panetsidou	3

Quarterfinals
(Italy) Silvia Semeraro	0
(Greece) Vasiliki Panetsidou	2

=== Bottom half ===
==== Section 3 ====
Round of 32
(Spain) María Isabel Nieto	0
(Portugal) Flávia Ribeiro	1
(Poland) Wiktoria Grejner	0
(Germany) Madeleine Schröter	1
(Republic of Ireland) Emma Dolan	1
(Slovenia) Kiti Smiljan	3

Round of 16
(Portugal) Flávia Ribeiro	0
(Germany) Madeleine Schröter	1
(Slovenia) Kiti Smiljan	1
(Turkey) Eda Eltemur	2

Quarterfinals
(Germany) Madeleine Schröter	0
(Turkey) Eda Eltemur	3

==== Section 4 ====
Round of 32
(Ukraine) Halyna Melnyk	0
(Serbia) Marina Radičević	1
(France) Alizée Agier	1
(Bosnia and Herzegovina) Ivona Ćavar	0

Round of 16
(Serbia) Marina Radičević	1
(Sweden) Alexandra Haag	4
(France) Alizée Agier	3
(Azerbaijan) Irina Zaretska	1

Quarterfinals
(Sweden) Alexandra Haag	0
(France) Alizée Agier	3
