= Karate at the 2017 World Games – Women's kumite 68 kg =

Women's Kumite 68kg at the 2017 World Games
- Venue: GEM Sports Complex
- Date: 26 July 2017
- Competitors: 8 from 8 nations

Medalists
| 1st place, gold medalist(s) | | (Algeria) Lamya Matoub |
| 2nd place, silver medalist(s) | | (Austria) Alisa Buchinger |
| 3rd place, bronze medalist(s) | | (Japan) Kayo Someya |

The women's kumite 68 kg competition in karate at the 2017 World Games took place on 26 July 2017 at the GEM Sports Complex in Wrocław, Poland.

== Results ==
=== Elimination round ===
==== Group A ====
| Rank | Athlete | B | W | D | L | Pts | Score |
|---|---|---|---|---|---|---|---|
| 1 | Kayo Someya (JPN) | 3 | 1 | 2 | 0 | 4 | 1–0 |
| 2 | Katrine Pedersen (DEN) | 3 | 2 | 0 | 1 | 4 | 5–4 |
| 3 | Marina Raković (MNE) | 3 | 1 | 1 | 1 | 3 | 3–2 |
| 4 | Elena Quirici (SUI) | 3 | 0 | 1 | 2 | 1 | 1–4 |

| | Score | |
|---|---|---|
| Marina Raković (MNE) | 1–0 | Elena Quirici (SUI) |
| Kayo Someya (JPN) | 1–0 | Katrine Pedersen (DEN) |
| Marina Raković (MNE) | 0–0 | Kayo Someya (JPN) |
| Elena Quirici (SUI) | 1–3 | Katrine Pedersen (DEN) |
| Marina Raković (MNE) | 2–2 | Katrine Pedersen (DEN) |
| Elena Quirici (SUI) | 0–0 | Kayo Someya (JPN) |

==== Group B ====
| Rank | Athlete | B | W | D | L | Pts | Score |
|---|---|---|---|---|---|---|---|
| 1 | Alisa Buchinger (AUT) | 3 | 2 | 1 | 0 | 5 | 7–0 |
| 2 | Lamya Matoub (ALG) | 3 | 2 | 1 | 0 | 5 | 6–0 |
| 3 | Kamila Warda (POL) | 3 | 1 | 0 | 2 | 2 | 7–12 |
| 4 | Amy Thomason (NZL) | 3 | 0 | 0 | 3 | 0 | 4–12 |

| | Score | |
|---|---|---|
| Kamila Warda (POL) | 0–5 | Alisa Buchinger (AUT) |
| Lamya Matoub (ALG) | 3–0 | Amy Thomason (NZL) |
| Kamila Warda (POL) | 0–3 | Lamya Matoub (ALG) |
| Alisa Buchinger (AUT) | 2–0 | Amy Thomason (NZL) |
| Kamila Warda (POL) | 7–4 | Amy Thomason (NZL) |
| Alisa Buchinger (AUT) | 0–0 | Lamya Matoub (ALG) |

=== Finals ===
Semifinals
Kayo Someya (JPN) | 1
Lamya Matoub (ALG) | 2
Alisa Buchinger (AUT) | 4
Katrine Pedersen (DEN) | 0

Final
Lamya Matoub (ALG) | 0
Alisa Buchinger (AUT) | 0
Third place
Kayo Someya (JPN) | 3
Katrine Pedersen (DEN) | 0
