= Elena Quirici =

Swiss karateka (born 1994)

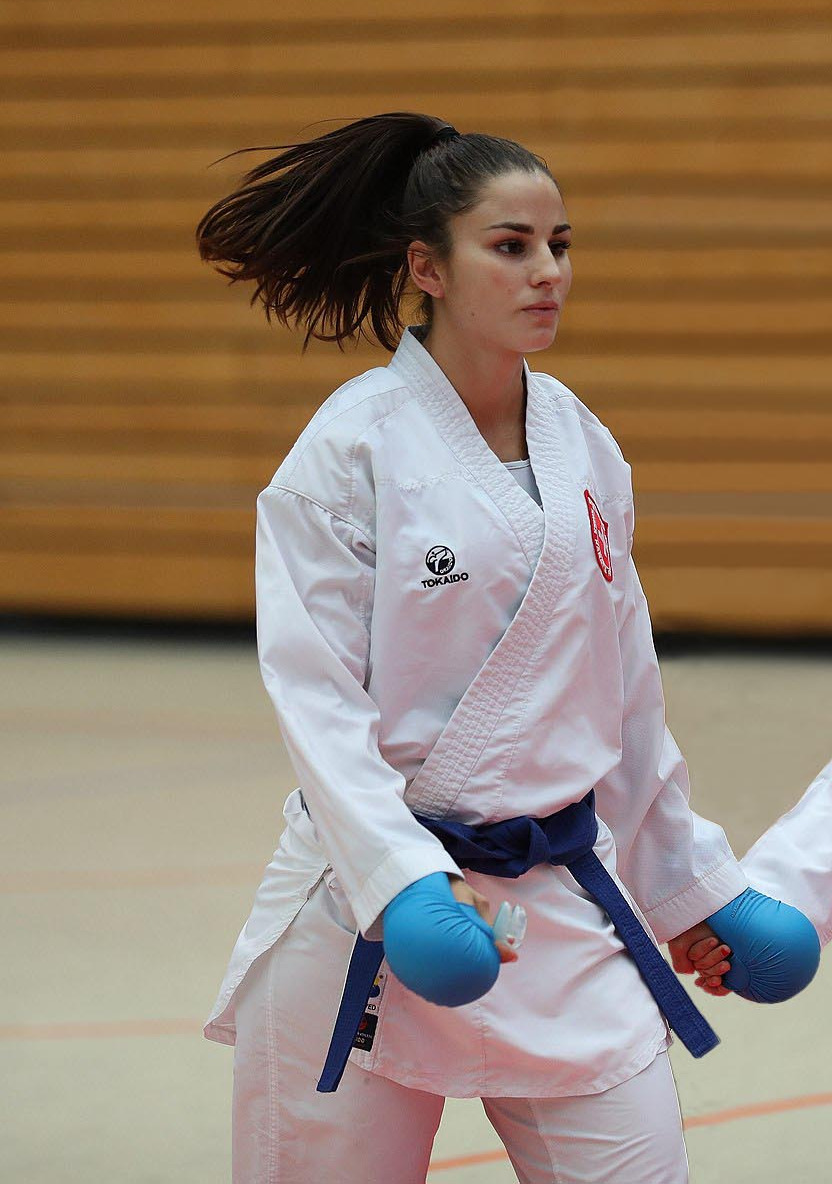
- Quirici in 2018

Personal information
- Born: 16 February 1994 (age 32)

Sport
- Country: Switzerland
- Sport: Karate
- Weight class: 68 kg
- Events: Kumite; Team kumite
Medal record
Women's karate
Representing Switzerland
World Games
Gold medal – first place	2025 Chengdu	Kumite 68 kg
World Championships
Silver medal – second place	2023 Budapest	Kumite 68 kg
Bronze medal – third place	2012 Paris	Kumite 61 kg
European Games
Silver medal – second place	2023 Kraków-Małopolska	Kumite 68 kg
Bronze medal – third place	2019 Minsk	Kumite 68 kg
European Championships
Gold medal – first place	2016 Montpellier	Kumite 68 kg
Gold medal – first place	2018 Novi Sad	Kumite 68 kg
Gold medal – first place	2018 Novi Sad	Team kumite
Gold medal – first place	2023 Guadalajara	Kumite 68 kg
Silver medal – second place	2015 Istanbul	Kumite 68 kg
Silver medal – second place	2019 Guadalajara	Kumite 68 kg
Silver medal – second place	2024 Zadar	Kumite 68 kg
Bronze medal – third place	2025 Yerevan	Kumite 68 kg

Elena Quirici (born 16 February 1994) is a Swiss karateka. She won the gold medal in the women's kumite 68 kg event at the 2025 World Games held in Chengdu, China. She is a two-time medalist at the World Karate Championships and an eight-time medalist, including four golds, at the European Karate Championships.

Quirici represented Switzerland at the 2020 Summer Olympics in Tokyo, Japan. She competed in the women's +61 kg event. Quirici is also a two-time medalist at the European Games.

== Career ==
At the 2012 World Karate Championships held in Paris, France, Quirici won one of the bronze medals in the women's kumite 61 kg event. In 2015, she won the silver medal in the women's kumite 68 kg event at the European Karate Championships held in Istanbul, Turkey. In that same year, Quirici lost her bronze medal match in the women's kumite 68 kg event at the 2015 European Games held in Baku, Azerbaijan. The following year, she won the gold medal in this event at the 2016 European Karate Championships held in Montpellier, France.

In 2017, Quirici competed in the women's kumite 68 kg event at the World Games held in Wrocław, Poland. She lost two matches and drew one match in the elimination round and she did not advance to the semi-finals.

At the 2018 European Karate Championships held in Novi Sad, Serbia, she won the gold medal in the women's kumite 68 kg event and also the gold medal in the women's team kumite event.

Quirici won one of the bronze medals in the women's kumite 68 kg event at the 2019 European Games held in Minsk, Belarus. Four years earlier, she lost her bronze medal match in the women's kumite 68 kg event at the 2015 European Games held in Baku, Azerbaijan.

In March 2020, Quirici was scheduled to represent Switzerland in karate at the 2020 Summer Olympics in Tokyo, Japan. This changed in March 2021 after the World Karate Federation revised the system for Olympic qualification. In June 2021, she was able to regain her qualification status at the World Olympic Qualification Tournament held in Paris, France. At the Olympics, Quirici finished in third place in her pool during the pool stage in the women's +61 kg event and she did not advance to compete in the semifinals. She was the flag bearer for Switzerland during the closing ceremony of the 2020 Summer Olympics. In November 2021, she competed in the women's 68 kg event at the World Karate Championships held in Dubai, United Arab Emirates where she was eliminated in her third match by Alisa Buchinger of Austria.

Quirici competed in the women's kumite 68 kg event at the 2022 European Karate Championships held in Gaziantep, Turkey. She was eliminated in her second match by eventual bronze medalist Vasiliki Panetsidou of Greece. Quirici also competed in the women's kumite 68 kg event at the 2022 World Games held in Birmingham, United States.

Quirici won the gold medal in the women's 68 kg event at the 2023 European Karate Championships held in Guadalajara, Spain. She defeated Irina Zaretska of Azerbaijan in her gold medal match. A few months later, Quirici lost against Irina Zaretska in the final of the women's 68 kg event at the 2023 European Games held in Poland. She won the silver medal in the women's 68 kg event at the World Karate Championships held in Budapest, Hungary.

Quirici won the silver medal in the women's 68 kg event at the 2024 European Karate Championships held in Zadar, Croatia. She won one of the bronze medals in the women's 68 kg event at the 2025 European Karate Championships held in Yerevan, Armenia. Quirici won the gold medal in the women's 68 kg event at the 2025 World Games held in Chengdu, China. She defeated Irina Zaretska of Azerbaijan in her gold medal match.

== Achievements ==
Year	Competition	Venue	Rank	Event
2012	World Championships	Paris, France	3rd	Kumite 61 kg
2015	European Championships	Istanbul, Turkey	2nd	Kumite 68 kg
2016	European Championships	Montpellier, France	1st	Kumite 68 kg
2018	European Championships	Novi Sad, Serbia	1st	Kumite 68 kg
2018	European Championships	Novi Sad, Serbia	1st	Team kumite
2019	European Championships	Guadalajara, Spain	2nd	Kumite 68 kg
2019	European Games	Minsk, Belarus	3rd	Kumite 68 kg
2023	European Championships	Guadalajara, Spain	1st	Kumite 68 kg
2023	European Games	Kraków and Małopolska, Poland	2nd	Kumite 68 kg
2023	World Championships	Budapest, Hungary	2nd	Kumite 68 kg
2024	European Championships	Zadar, Croatia	2nd	Kumite 68 kg
2025	European Championships	Yerevan, Armenia	3rd	Kumite 68 kg
2025	World Games	Chengdu, China	1st	Kumite 68 kg
