= 2016 World University Karate Championships =

University Karate Championship

- Host city: Braga, Portugal
- Organiser: FISU
- Nations: 35
- Athletes: 289
- Dates: 10–13 August

The 2016 World University Karate Championships was the 10th edition of World University Karate Championships and took place in Braga, Portugal between August 10 and August 13, 2016.

== Medalists ==
=== Men ===
Event	Gold	Silver	Bronze
Individual kata	Hiroki Kubo Japan	Mohammed El Hanni Morocco	William Geoffray France
Individual kata	Hiroki Kubo Japan	Mohammed El Hanni Morocco	Peter Fabian Slovakia
Team kata	Japan Keita Nishihara Kazumasa Moto Ryuji Moto	France Lucas Jeannot Ahmed Zemouri Enzo Montarello	Spain Jose Manuel Carbonell Lopez Antonio Garcia Vargas Lorenzo Carios Marin Villalobos
Team kata	Japan Keita Nishihara Kazumasa Moto Ryuji Moto	France Lucas Jeannot Ahmed Zemouri Enzo Montarello	Egypt Islam Hassan Zeyad Mohamed Ahmed Elswafy
Kumite −60 kg	Matias Gomez Garcia Spain	Aly Smail Egypt	Sadriddin Saymatov Uzbekistan
Kumite −60 kg	Matias Gomez Garcia Spain	Aly Smail Egypt	Maximiliano Larrosa Uruguay
Kumite −67 kg	Steven Da Costa France	Stefan Pokorny Austria	Magdy Abdelazez Egypt
Kumite −67 kg	Steven Da Costa France	Stefan Pokorny Austria	Barney Gill New Zealand
Kumite −75 kg	Ali El-Sawy Egypt	Ken Nishimura Japan	Dastonbek Otabolaev Uzbekistan
Kumite −75 kg	Ali El-Sawy Egypt	Ken Nishimura Japan	Wei-Chieh Hsu Chinese Taipei
Kumite −84 kg	Mohamed Elkotby Egypt	Chun-Wei Wu Chinese Taipei	Jamaal Ismail Khalid Otto United Kingdom
Kumite −84 kg	Mohamed Elkotby Egypt	Chun-Wei Wu Chinese Taipei	Jessie Da Costa France
Kumite +84 kg	Ljubisa Mihailovic Montenegro	Arsen Megrabian Russian Federation	Ahmed Elasfar Egypt
Kumite +84 kg	Ljubisa Mihailovic Montenegro	Arsen Megrabian Russian Federation	Hocine Daikhi Algeria
Team kumite	Japan Naotaka Ishihama Kamaguchi Koki Masamichi Funahashi Eiki Onishi Ken Nishimura Yuta Yoshiya	Spain Pablo Arenas Zapata Raul Cuerva Mora Daniel Gomez Borge Matias Gomez Garcia Jagoba Vizuete Fernandez	Egypt Ahmed Elasfar Zeyad Mohamed Magdy Abdelazez Aly Ismail Islam Hassan Ali Elsawy Mohamed Elkotby
Team kumite	Japan Naotaka Ishihama Kamaguchi Koki Masamichi Funahashi Eiki Onishi Ken Nishimura Yuta Yoshiya	Spain Pablo Arenas Zapata Raul Cuerva Mora Daniel Gomez Borge Matias Gomez Garcia Jagoba Vizuete Fernandez	Algeria Mouad Achache Abdelatif Benkhaled Hocine Daikhi Bilel Hareche Abdelmoumene Madi

=== Women ===
Event	Gold	Silver	Bronze
Individual kata	Misaki Tanaka Japan	Sakura Kokumai United States	Randa Abdelaziz Egypt
Individual kata	Misaki Tanaka Japan	Sakura Kokumai United States	Alexandra Feracci France
Team kata	Spain Margarita Morata Martos Jessica Moreno Wilkinson Lidia Rodríguez Encabo	Portugal Ana Sofîa Cruz Rita Morgado Patricia Cardoso	Czech Republic Barbora Kočtârovâ Simona Forstovâ Veronika Miškovâ
Team kata	Spain Margarita Morata Martos Jessica Moreno Wilkinson Lidia Rodríguez Encabo	Portugal Ana Sofîa Cruz Rita Morgado Patricia Cardoso	Egypt Randa Abdelaziz Nour Elswafy Shaimaa Solyman
Kumite −50 kg	Rocio Sanches Estepa Spain	Miho Miyahara Japan	Ku Tsui-ping Chinese Taipei
Kumite −50 kg	Rocio Sanches Estepa Spain	Miho Miyahara Japan	Bettina Plank Austria
Kumite −55 kg	Emily Thouy France	Simona Zaborska Macedonia	Wen Tzu-yun Chinese Taipei
Kumite −55 kg	Emily Thouy France	Simona Zaborska Macedonia	Aya Brahim Egypt
Kumite −61 kg	Giana Lotfy Egypt	Natasha Stefanovska Macedonia	Yin Xiaoyan China
Kumite −61 kg	Giana Lotfy Egypt	Natasha Stefanovska Macedonia	Ayami Moriguchi Japan
Kumite −68 kg	Alizée Agier France	Alisa Buchinger Austria	Maya Suzuki Japan
Kumite −68 kg	Alizée Agier France	Alisa Buchinger Austria	Titta Keinänen Finland
Kumite +68 kg	Natsumi Kawamura Japan	Meltem Hocaoğlu Turkey	Amelia Jayne Harvey United Kingdom
Kumite +68 kg	Natsumi Kawamura Japan	Meltem Hocaoğlu Turkey	Sohila Ahmed Egypt
Team kumite	Egypt Giana Lotfy Nada Mohamd Aisha Mohamed Hoda Moshraf	Chinese Taipei Ku Tsui-ping Wen Tzu-yun Ching-Hsiu Kao Chao Jou	Austria Alisa Buchinger Amila Gojak Bettina Plank Nathalie Reiter
Team kumite	Egypt Giana Lotfy Nada Mohamd Aisha Mohamed Hoda Moshraf	Chinese Taipei Ku Tsui-ping Wen Tzu-yun Ching-Hsiu Kao Chao Jou	Macedonia Sara Radichevska Monika Stefanovska Natasha Stefanovska Simona Zaborska

== Medal count table ==
Rank	Nation	Gold	Silver	Bronze	Total
1	Japan (JPN)	5	2	2	9
2	Egypt (EGY)	4	1	8	13
3	France (FRA)	3	1	3	7
4	Spain (ESP)	3	1	1	5
5	Montenegro (MNE)	1	0	0	1
6	Chinese Taipei (TPE)	0	2	3	5
7	Austria (AUT)	0	2	2	4
8	North Macedonia (MKD)	0	2	1	3
9	Morocco (MAR)	0	1	0	1
9	Portugal (POR)	0	1	0	1
9	Russia (RUS)	0	1	0	1
9	Turkey (TUR)	0	1	0	1
9	United States (USA)	0	1	0	1
14	Algeria (ALG)	0	0	2	2
14	Great Britain (GBR)	0	0	2	2
14	Uzbekistan (UZB)	0	0	2	2
17	China (CHN)	0	0	1	1
17	Czech Republic (CZE)	0	0	1	1
17	Finland (FIN)	0	0	1	1
17	New Zealand (NZL)	0	0	1	1
17	Slovakia (SVK)	0	0	1	1
17	Uruguay (URU)	0	0	1	1
Totals (22 entries)		16	16	32	64

== See also ==
- World University Championships
