= 2023 European Karate Championships – Women's 68 kg =

European Karate Championship

Women's 68 kg at the 2023 European Karate Championships
- Venue: Palacio Multiusos de Guadalajara
- Location: Guadalajara, Spain
- Dates: 22, 25 March
- Competitors: 29 from 29 nations

Medalists
gold medal	Elena Quirici	Switzerland
silver medal	Irina Zaretska	Azerbaijan
bronze medal	Silvia Semeraro	Italy
bronze medal	María Nieto	Spain

The Women's 68 kg competition at the 2023 European Karate Championships was held on 22 and 25 March 2023.

== Results ==
=== Finals ===
Semifinals
(Switzerland) Elena Quirici	3
(Italy) Silvia Semeraro	1
(Turkey) Eda Eltemur	5
(Azerbaijan) Irina Zaretska	6

Final
(Switzerland) Elena Quirici	0
(Azerbaijan) Irina Zaretska	0

=== Repechage ===
Repechage 1
(England) Lauren Salisbury	7
(Austria) Hanna Devigili	0

Repechage 2
(England) Lauren Salisbury	2
(France) Alizée Agier	6

Bronze medal
(France) Alizée Agier	1
(Italy) Silvia Semeraro	1

Repechage
(Montenegro) Vasilisa Bujić	1
(Spain) María Nieto	3

Bronze medal
(Spain) María Nieto	7
(Turkey) Eda Eltemur	2

=== Top half ===
==== Section 1 ====
Round of 32
(Greece) Konstantina Peppa	2
(Portugal) Carolina Arsénio	0
(Sweden) Alexandra Haag	0
(France) Alizée Agier	6
(Finland) Elina Lehtonen	1
(Austria) Hanna Devigili	1
(England) Lauren Salisbury	0
(Switzerland) Elena Quirici	8

Round of 16
(Greece) Konstantina Peppa	0
(France) Alizée Agier	4
(Austria) Hanna Devigili	1
(Switzerland) Elena Quirici	3

Quarterfinals
(France) Alizée Agier	1
(Switzerland) Elena Quirici	1

==== Section 2 ====
Round of 32
(Netherlands) Robin van Wezel	1
(Bosnia and Herzegovina) Ivona Ćavar	2
(Croatia) Sadea Bećirović	2
(Germany) Madeleine Schröter	0
(Cyprus) Evangelia Kagia	0
(Serbia) Marina Radičević	3

Round of 16
(Bosnia and Herzegovina) Ivona Ćavar	2
(Croatia) Sadea Bećirović	2
(Serbia) Marina Radičević	0
(Italy) Silvia Semeraro	5

Quarterfinals
(Croatia) Sadea Bećirović	1
(Italy) Silvia Semeraro	2

=== Bottom half ===
==== Section 3 ====
Round of 32
(Hungary) Dorottya Pap	0
(Republic of Ireland) Caitlin Kelly	7
(Romania) Dana Teodorescu	2
(Turkey) Eda Eltemur	5
(Denmark) Sarah Aakerman	0
(Slovenia) Elizabeta Molnar	4

Round of 16
(Republic of Ireland) Caitlin Kelly	3
(Turkey) Eda Eltemur	4
(Slovenia) Elizabeta Molnar	2
(Ukraine) Halyna Melnyk	3

Quarterfinals
(Turkey) Eda Eltemur	1
(Ukraine) Halyna Melnyk	0

==== Section 4 ====
Round of 32
(Slovakia) Sára Krivdová	2
(Armenia) Anita Makyan	7
(Spain) María Nieto	9
(North Macedonia) Angela Mojsovska	3
(Montenegro) Vasilisa Bujić	6
(Poland) Wiktoria Grejner	1

Round of 16
(Armenia) Anita Makyan	0
(Spain) María Nieto	7
(Montenegro) Vasilisa Bujić	2
(Azerbaijan) Irina Zaretska	4

Quarterfinals
(Spain) María Nieto	7
(Azerbaijan) Irina Zaretska	7
