= Avishan Bagheri =

Iranian karateka (born 1998)

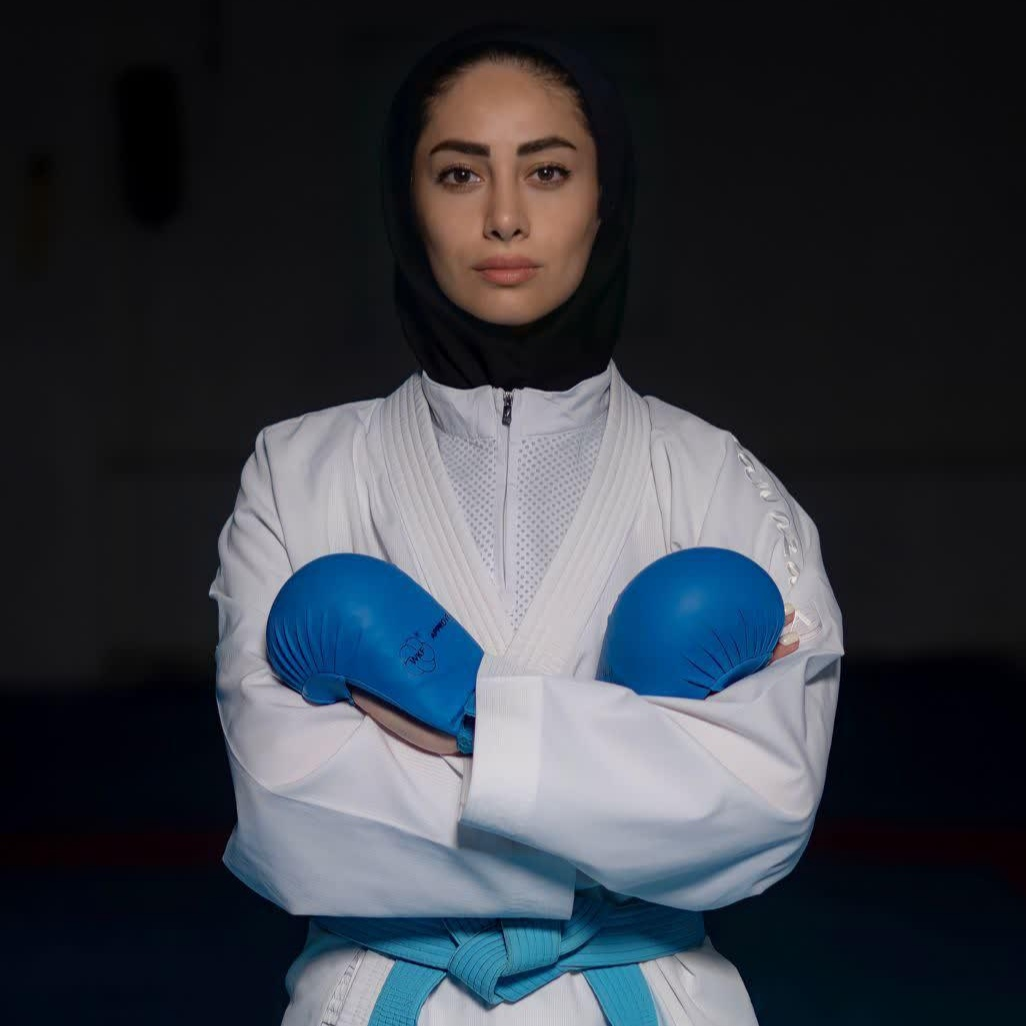

Personal information
- Born: April 7, 1998 (age 28) Bandar Anzali, Iran
- Education: physical education
- Height: 170 cm (5 ft 7 in)
- Weight: 57 kg (126 lb)

Sport
- Country: Iran
- Sport: karate
- Club: Bagheri Karate Academy
- Coached by: Mostafa Bagheri
Medal record
Representing Iran
Women's karate
World Championship U21
| Gold medal – first place | 2017 Tenerife | -55 kg |
Asian Championship U21
| Gold medal – first place | 2017 Kazakhstan | -55 kg |
| Gold medal – first place | 2013 Dubai | -54 kg |
| Silver medal – second place | 2014 Malaysia | -59 kg |
world university Championship (WUC)
| Silver medal – second place | 2018 Japan | -55 kg |
Asian University Championship
| Silver medal – second place | 2019 Macao | -55 kg |

Avishan Bagheri (born 1998 in Bandar Anzali) is an Iranian karateka. She started with Karate from the age of four under the supervision of her father, Mustafa Bagheri, and she is active in the Shitorio style.

== Medals ==
She has one world gold medal, two Asian gold and one silver medal, and two world and Asian student silver medals.

She won a gold medal at the 2012 World Youth Karate League in Turkey.

She won a gold medal at the 2013 Asian Youth Karate Championships in the UAE.

At the 2014 International Youth Karate Championships in Thailand, she won a gold medal. She won a silver medal at the 2014 Asian Youth Karate Championships in Malaysia.

At the 2017 Asian Hope Karate Championships in Kazakhstan, she won the gold medal. At the 2017 World Hope Karate Championships in Spain, she stood on the championship podium.

She won second place in the 2018 World Adult Karate Competition held in Japan.

She won a bronze medal at the 2019 Asian Student Karate Championships in Macau.

| Year | Competition | Venue | Position | Notes |
Representing the Iran
| 2018 | World Championships -21 age | Spain | 1st | 55- kg |
| 2017 | Asian Championships -21 age | Kazakhstan | 1st | 55- kg |
| 2016 | Asian Championships Cadet Emarat | Emarat | 1st | 54- kg |
| 2014 | Asian Championships Junior Malaysia | Malaysia | 2nd | 59- kg |
| 2018 | World University Senior Japan | Japan | 2nd | 55- kg |
| 2019 | Asian University Senior Macao | Macao | 2nd | 55- kg |
