= Ivona Ćavar =

Bosnian martial artist

- Born: 19 October 1995 (age 30); Split, Croatia
- Height: 176 cm (5 ft 9 in)
- Style: Shotokan
- Rank: Black belt

Ivona Ćavar (born 19 October 1995 in Split, Croatia) is a leading women's Bosnian karate competitor.

In June 2021, she competed at the World Olympic Qualification Tournament held in Paris, France hoping to qualify for the 2020 Summer Olympics in Tokyo, Japan. In November 2021, she competed in the women's 68 kg event at the 2021 World Karate Championships held in Dubai, United Arab Emirates.

She competed in the women's kumite 68 kg event at the 2022 European Karate Championships held in Gaziantep, Turkey. She also competed in the women's 68 kg event at the 2023 European Karate Championships held in Guadalajara, Spain.

== Achievements ==
2016

- Bronze World Championships – October, Linz, AUS – kumite -68 kg

2018

- Bronze European Championships – May, Novi Sad, SER – kumite -68 kg

Awards

- Bosnian Sportswoman of the Year: 2016
