= 2022 European Karate Championships – Women's team kumite =

European Karate Championship

Women's team kumite at the 2022 European Karate Championships
- Venue: Karataş Şahinbey Sport Hall
- Location: Gaziantep, Turkey
- Dates: 26–28 May
- Nations: 28
- Teams: 28

Medalists
gold medal	Sadea Bećirović; Lucija Lesjak; Lea Vukoja; Mia Greta Zorko	Croatia
silver medal	Miroslava Kopúňová; Lucia Kováčiková; Hana Kuklová; Ingrida Suchánková	Slovakia
bronze medal	María Espinosa; Carlota Fernández; María Nieto; María Torres	Spain
bronze medal	Alizée Agier; Léa Avazeri; Laura Sivert; Jennifer Zameto	France

The Women's team kumite competition at the 2022 European Karate Championships was held from 26 to 28 May 2022.

== Results ==
=== Finals ===
Semifinals
Croatia	2
Spain	1
Slovakia	2
Austria	0

Final
Croatia	2
Slovakia	1

=== Repechage ===
Repechage 2
Azerbaijan	1
Sweden	2

Bronze medal
Sweden	0
Spain	2

Repechage 1
North Macedonia	1
Bosnia and Herzegovina	2

Repechage 2
Bosnia and Herzegovina
France

Bronze medal
France
Austria

=== Top half ===
==== Section 1 ====
Round of 32
Israel	1
Sweden	1
Greece	1
Hungary	1
Serbia	1
Azerbaijan	2

Round of 16
Sweden	2
Hungary	0
Azerbaijan	1
Croatia	2

Quarterfinals
Sweden	0
Croatia	2

==== Section 2 ====
Round of 32
Finland	2
Belgium	0
Spain	2
Kosovo	0
Portugal	0
Switzerland	2

Round of 16
Finland	0
Spain	2
Switzerland	2
Turkey	0

Quarterfinals
Spain	2
Switzerland	1

=== Bottom half ===
==== Section 3 ====
Round of 32
North Macedonia	1
Slovakia	2
Bosnia and Herzegovina	2
Cyprus	1
Romania	0
France	2

Round of 16
Slovakia	2
Bosnia and Herzegovina	0
France	2
Italy	0

Quarterfinals
Slovakia	2
France	1

==== Section 4 ====
Round of 32
Ireland	0
Austria	2
Montenegro	2
Ukraine	0
Netherlands	0
Scotland	2

Round of 16
Austria	1
Montenegro	0
Scotland	0
Germany	2

Quarterfinals
Austria	2
Germany	1
