= Irina Zaretska =

Azerbaijani karateka (born 1996)

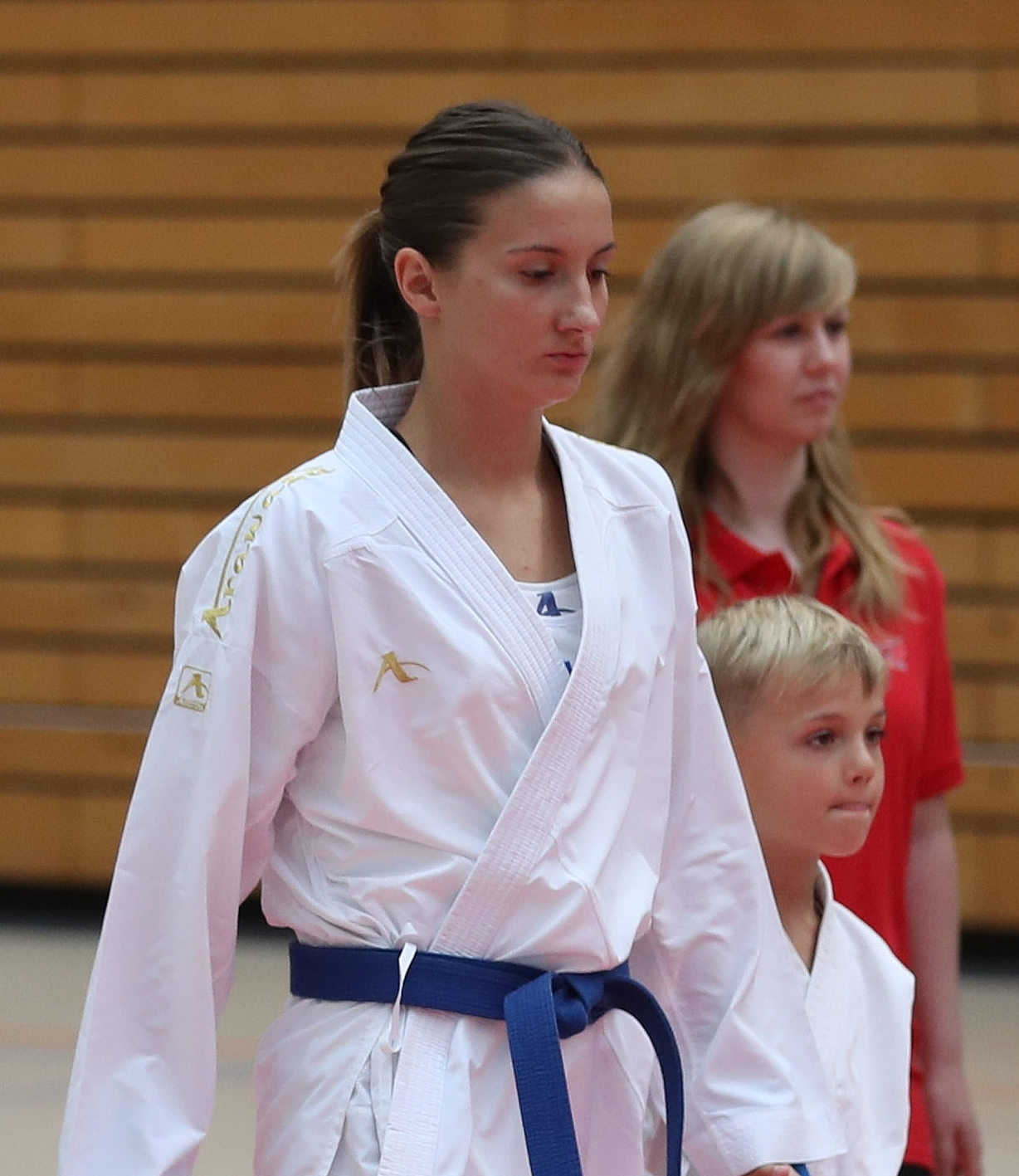
- Zaretska in 2018

Personal information
- Born: 4 March 1996 (age 30) Odesa, Ukraine

Sport
- Country: Azerbaijan (since 2015); Ukraine (until 2014)
- Sport: Karate
- Weight class: 68 kg; +61 kg (Olympic Games)
- Events: Kumite; Team kumite
- Coached by: Denys Morozov
Medal record
Women's karate
Representing Ukraine
World Championships
Bronze medal – third place	2014 Bremen	Kumite 68 kg
European Championships
Bronze medal – third place	2014 Tampere	Team kumite
Representing Azerbaijan
Olympic Games
Silver medal – second place	2020 Tokyo	Kumite +61 kg
World Games
Silver medal – second place	2025 Chengdu	Kumite 68 kg
World Championships
Gold medal – first place	2018 Madrid	Kumite 68 kg
Gold medal – first place	2021 Dubai	Kumite 68 kg
Gold medal – first place	2023 Budapest	Kumite 68 kg
Bronze medal – third place	2025 Cairo	Kumite 68 kg
European Games
Gold medal – first place	2015 Baku	Kumite 68 kg
Gold medal – first place	2023 Kraków-Małopolska	Kumite 68 kg
Silver medal – second place	2019 Minsk	Kumite 68 kg
European Championships
Gold medal – first place	2016 Montpellier	Team kumite
Gold medal – first place	2021 Poreč	Kumite 68 kg
Silver medal – second place	2018 Novi Sad	Kumite 68 kg
Silver medal – second place	2023 Guadalajara	Kumite 68 kg
Bronze medal – third place	2026 Frankfurt	Kumite 68 kg
Bronze medal – third place	2026 Frankfurt	Team kumite
Islamic Solidarity Games
Gold medal – first place	2017 Baku	Kumite 68 kg
Gold medal – first place	2021 Konya	Kumite 68 kg
Gold medal – first place	2025 Riyadh	Kumite 68 kg

Irina Zaretska (born 4 March 1996) is a Ukrainian (until 2014) and Azerbaijani (since 2015) karateka. She won the silver medal in the women's +61 kg event at the 2020 Summer Olympics held in Tokyo, Japan. She is a three-time gold medalist in the women's 68 kg event at the World Karate Championships (2018, 2021 and 2023). Zaretska is also a three-time gold medalist in this event at the Islamic Solidarity Games (2017, 2022 and 2025) and a two-time gold medalist at the European Games (2015 and 2023).

== Career ==
Zaretska won a bronze medal in the women's kumite 68 kg event at the 2014 World Karate Championships held in Bremen, Germany. At the 2017 Islamic Solidarity Games held in Baku, Azerbaijan, she won the gold medal in the women's kumite 68 kg event.

At the 2018 European Karate Championships held in Novi Sad, Serbia, Zaretska won the silver medal in the women's kumite 68 kg event. In the final, she lost against Elena Quirici of Switzerland. She also became world champion in the women's kumite 68 kg event at the 2018 World Karate Championships held in Madrid, Spain.

In 2019, Zaretska won the silver medal in the women's kumite 68 kg event at the European Games held in Minsk, Belarus. Four years earlier, she won the gold medal in this event at the 2015 European Games held in Baku, Azerbaijan.

Zaretska represented Azerbaijan in karate at the 2020 Summer Olympics in Tokyo, Japan. She won the silver medal in the women's +61 kg event. In November 2021, she won the gold medal in the women's 68 kg event at the World Karate Championships held in Dubai, United Arab Emirates.

She competed in the women's kumite 68 kg event at the 2022 European Karate Championships held in Gaziantep, Turkey. She also competed in the women's team kumite event. She lost her bronze medal match in the women's 68 kg event at the 2022 World Games held in Birmingham, United States. She won the gold medal in the women's 68 kg event at the 2021 Islamic Solidarity Games held in Konya, Turkey.

Zaretska won the silver medal in the women's 68 kg event at the 2023 European Karate Championships held in Guadalajara, Spain. A few months later, she won the gold medal in her event at the 2023 European Games held in Poland. She also won the gold medal in the women's 68 kg event at the 2023 World Karate Championships held in Budapest, Hungary.

Zaretska won the silver medal in the women's 68 kg event at the 2025 World Games held in Chengdu, China.

On 23 December 2025, at the event dedicated to the 2025 sports year review organized by the Ministry of Youth and Sports of Azerbaijan, Irina Zaretska was awarded the title of “Best Athlete In Non-Olympic Sports of 2025.”

In March 2026, at the Karate1 Premier League tournament in Italy, Zaretskaya defeated German athlete Hanna Riedel 2:0 and took third place.

== Achievements ==
Year	Competition	Venue	Rank	Event
2014	European Championships	Tampere, Finland	3rd	Team kumite
2014	World Championships	Bremen, Germany	3rd	Kumite 68 kg
2015	European Games	Baku, Azerbaijan	1st	Kumite 68 kg
2016	European Championships	Montpellier, France	1st	Team kumite
2017	Islamic Solidarity Games	Baku, Azerbaijan	1st	Kumite 68 kg
2018	European Championships	Novi Sad, Serbia	2nd	Kumite 68 kg
2018	World Championships	Madrid, Spain	1st	Kumite 68 kg
2019	European Games	Minsk, Belarus	2nd	Kumite 68 kg
2021	European Championships	Poreč, Croatia	1st	Kumite 68 kg
2021	Olympic Games	Tokyo, Japan	2nd	Kumite +61 kg
2021	World Championships	Dubai, United Arab Emirates	1st	Kumite 68 kg
2022	Islamic Solidarity Games	Konya, Turkey	1st	Kumite 68 kg
2023	European Championships	Guadalajara, Spain	2nd	Kumite 68 kg
2023	European Games	Kraków and Małopolska, Poland	1st	Kumite 68 kg
2023	World Championships	Budapest, Hungary	1st	Kumite 68 kg
2025	World Games	Chengdu, China	2nd	Kumite 68 kg
2025	Islamic Solidarity Games	Riyadh, Saudi Arabia	1st	Kumite 68 kg
2025	World Championships	Cairo, Egypt	3rd	Kumite 68 kg
2026	European Championships	Frankfurt, Germany	3rd	Kumite 68 kg
2026	European Championships	Frankfurt, Germany	3rd	Team kumite
