= Lamya Matoub =

French-Algerian karateka (born 1992)

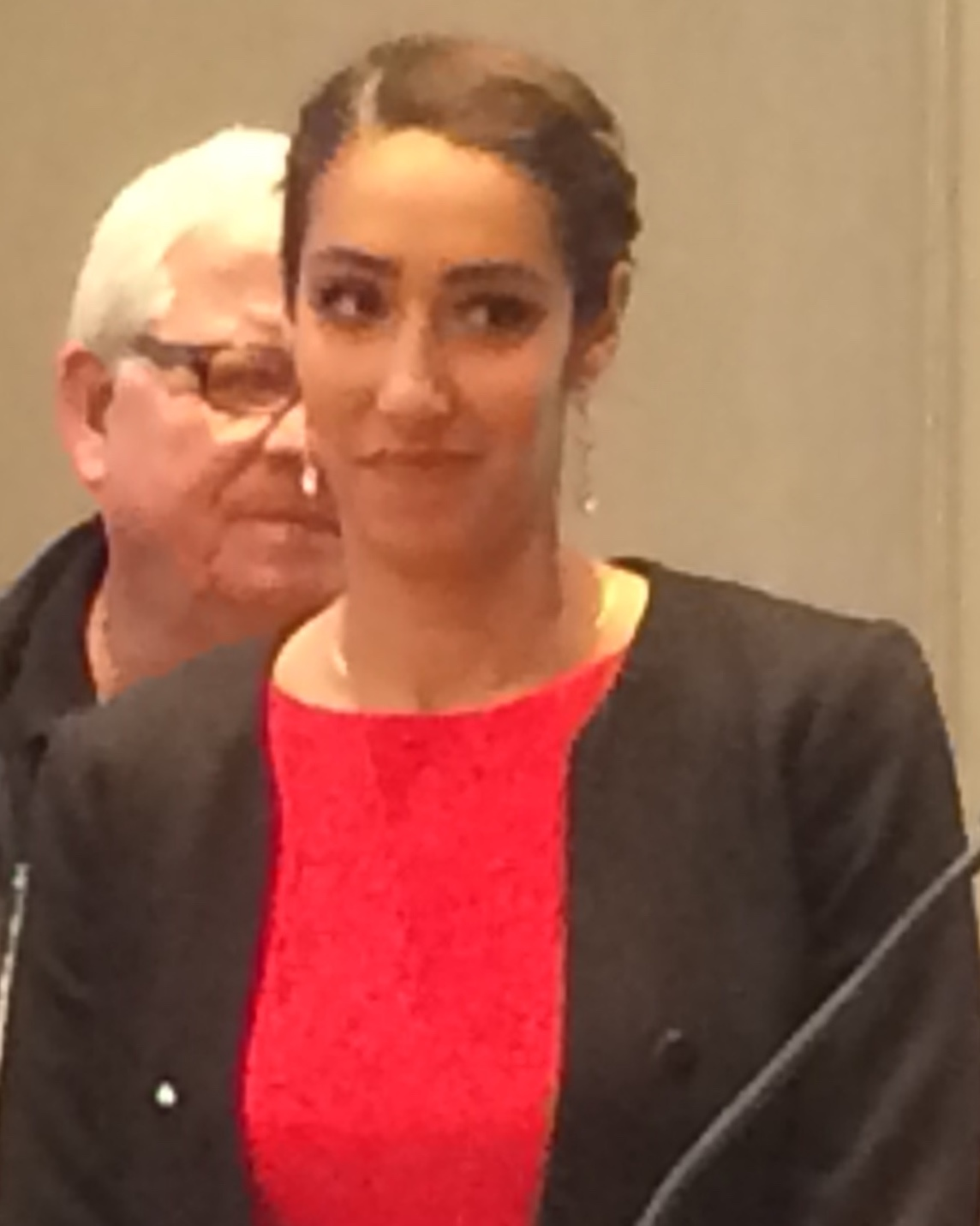
- Matoub in 2018
- Born: January 18, 1992 (age 34); France
- Nationality: Algeria France

Lamya Matoub (born 18 January 1992) is a French-Algerian female karateka who generally competes in the kumite category. She has played in domestic competitions in France representing Sarcelles club and shifted her focus to represent Algeria in international competitions. Lamya has claimed medals at various sporting events including the World Karate Championships and the World Games. On 26 August 2019, she claimed a bronze, her second African Games medal in the 50 kg kumite category, during the 2019 African Games after failing to defend the gold medal she had won during the 2015 African Games.

== Career ==
She pursued her career in Algeria and represented Algeria internationally from 2015 and eventually represented Algeria at the 2015 African Games and claimed a gold medal in the women's kumite 68 kg event. At the 2017 World Games, she secured the gold medal in the women's kumite 68 kg event.

She also became the champion in the 2018 African Karate Championships and was part of the Algerian team which claimed gold in the team event at the 2018 African Karate Championships. In July 2019, she bagged a silver medal in 68 kg kumite event during the 2019 African Karate Championships.

Most notably, she also clinched a bronze medal at the 2018 World Karate Championships representing Algeria. She also represented Algeria at the 2019 African Games and went onto claim bronze medal in the women's 68 kg kumite event while her compatriot Imane Taleb also claimed a bronze in 50 kg women's kumite event.

In 2021, she competed at the World Olympic Qualification Tournament held in Paris, France, hoping to qualify for the 2020 Summer Olympics in Tokyo, Japan. She did not qualify at this tournament, but she was able to qualify via continental representation soon after. She competed in the women's +61 kg event.

== Achievements ==
Year	Competition	Venue	Rank	Event
2017	World Games 2017	Wroclaw, Poland	3rd	Kumite 68 kg
2018	World Championships	Madrid, Spain	3rd	Kumite 68 kg
