= Eda Eltemur =

Turkish karateka (born 1999)

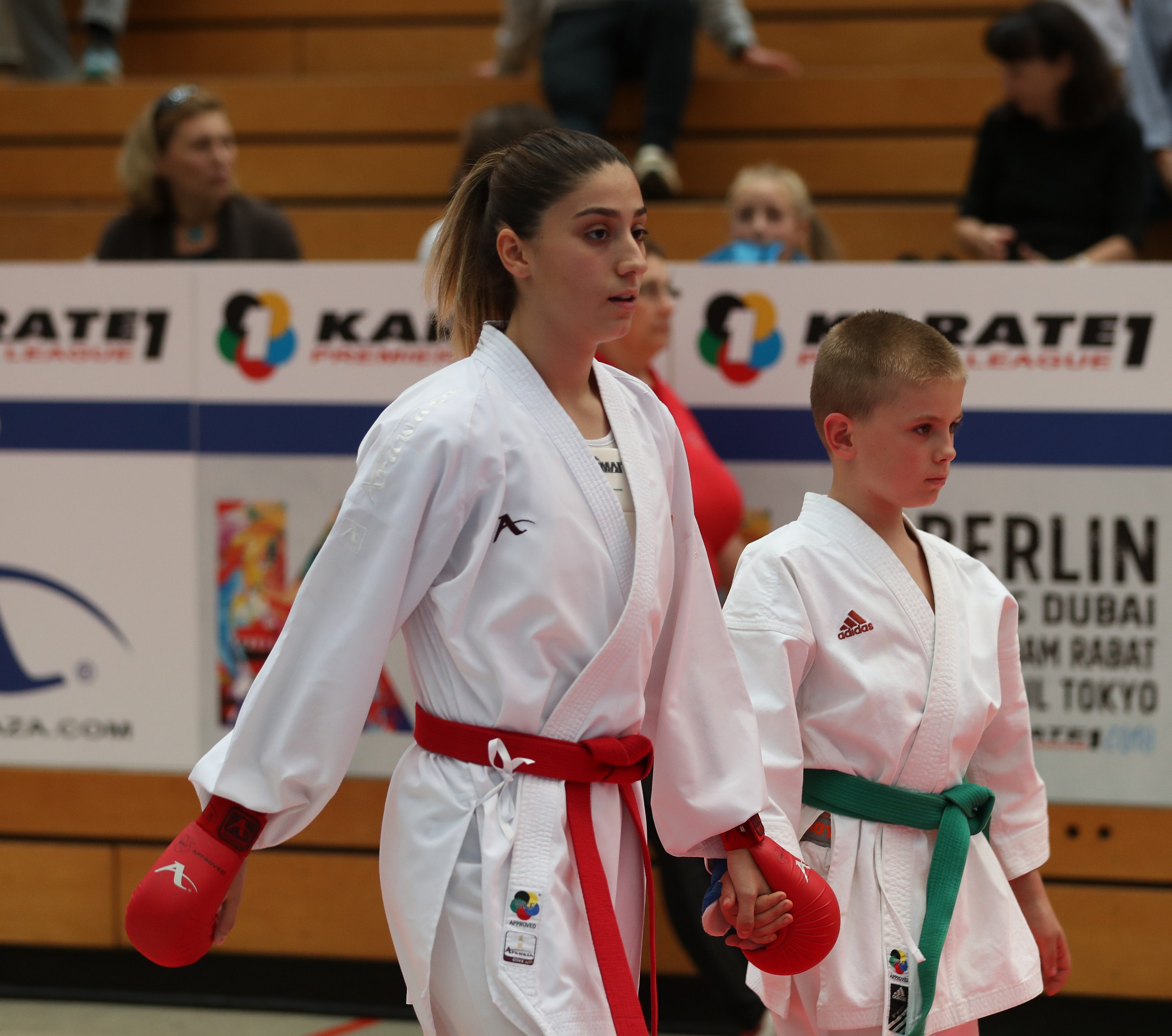
- Eda Eltemur in Berlin in 2018

Personal information
- Born: 11 April 1999 (age 27) Gölcük, Kocaeli Province, Turkey

Sport
- Country: Turkey
- Sport: Karate
- Weight class: 68 kg
- Event: Kumite
Medal record
Women's karate
Representing Turkey
European Championships
Gold medal – first place	2022 Gaziantep	Kumite 68 kg
Silver medal – second place	2019 Guadalajara	Team kumite
Silver medal – second place	2021 Poreč	Team kumite
Bronze medal – third place	2021 Poreč	Kumite 68 kg
Bronze medal – third place	2024 Zadar	Team kumite
Mediterranean Games
Silver medal – second place	2018 Tarragona	Kumite 68 kg
Bronze medal – third place	2022 Oran	Kumite 68 kg
Bronze medal – third place	2026 Taranto	Kumite 68 kg
Islamic Solidarity Games
Silver medal – second place	2017 Baku	Kumite 68 kg
Silver medal – second place	2025 Riyadh	Kumite 68 kg
Bronze medal – third place	2021 Konya	Kumite 68 kg

Eda Eltemur (born 11 April 1999) is a Turkish karateka. She won the gold medal in the women's 68 kg event at the 2022 European Karate Championships held in Gaziantep, Turkey. She is also a three-time medalist at the Islamic Solidarity Games and the Mediterranean Games.

== Career ==
At the 2017 Islamic Solidarity Games held in Baku, Azerbaijan, she won the silver medal in the women's kumite 68 kg event. In 2019, she won the silver medal in the women's team kumite event at the European Karate Championships held in Guadalajara, Spain.

She won one of the bronze medals in the women's 68 kg event at the 2022 Mediterranean Games held in Oran, Algeria. She won one of the bronze medals in the women's 68 kg event at the 2021 Islamic Solidarity Games held in Konya, Turkey.

She lost her bronze medal match in the women's 68 kg event at the 2023 European Karate Championships held in Guadalajara.

== Achievements ==
Year	Competition	Venue	Rank	Event
2017	Islamic Solidarity Games	Baku, Azerbaijan	2nd	Kumite 68 kg
2018	Mediterranean Games	Tarragona, Spain	2nd	Kumite 68 kg
2019	European Championships	Guadalajara, Spain	2nd	Team kumite
2021	European Championships	Poreč, Croatia	3rd	Kumite 68 kg
2021	European Championships	Poreč, Croatia	2nd	Team kumite
2022	European Championships	Gaziantep, Turkey	1st	Kumite 68 kg
2022	Mediterranean Games	Oran, Algeria	3rd	Kumite 68 kg
2022	Islamic Solidarity Games	Konya, Turkey	3rd	Kumite 68 kg
2024	European Championships	Zadar, Croatia	3rd	Team kumite
2025	Islamic Solidarity Games	Riyadh, Saudi Arabia	2nd	Kumite 68 kg
2026	Mediterranean Games	Taranto, Italy	3rd	Kumite 68 kg
