= Karate1 Premier League =

- Current event or competition: 2023 Karate1 Premier League

Competition details
- Discipline: Karate
- Organiser: World Karate Federation (WKF)

History
- First edition: 2011

The Karate1 Premier League is a Karate competition Initiated by the World Karate Federation in the year of 2011 with two tournaments held in Paris and Istanbul, the Karate1-Premier League- has made exponential progress in terms of magnitude and status of the tournaments as well as the number of participants and countries represented.

The Karate1-Premier League comprises a number of prominent Karate competitions and endeavors with the goal of bringing together the best Karate athletes in the world in an open championship.

Karate1 Premier League events is homogeneous system for qualification to the Olympic Karate tournament Started from 2018 at Berlin, Germany event and ended with 2021 Lisbon, Portugal event for the 2020 Olympic Games qualification standing.

In 2022, a new round-robin format was introduced at the Karate1 Premier League.

== Events ==
Number	Series	Stages	Events
1	2011	3	28
2	2012	8	110
3	2013	8	110
4	2014	8	111
5	2015	8	112
6	2016	11	152
7	2017	5	70
8	2018	7	98
9	2019	7	98
10	2020	3	42
11	2021	5	70
12	2022	4	
13	2023	4	
14	2024	4	
15	2025	4	
16	2026	4	

=== 2011 ===
Stages	Host	Events
1	(France) Paris	
2	(Turkey) Istanbul	14
3	(Austria) Salzburg	14

=== 2012 ===
Stages	Host	Events
1	(France) Paris	14
2	(Netherlands) Dordrecht	14
3	(Indonesia) Jakarta	14
4	(South Korea) Busan	12
5	(Turkey) Istanbul	14
6	(Germany) Hanau	14
7	(Greece) Athens	14
8	(Austria) Salzburg	14

=== 2013 ===
Stages	Host	Events
1	(Turkey) Istanbul	14
2	(Germany) Hanau	14
3	(Austria) Salzburg	14
4	(France) Paris	14
5	(Netherlands) Dordrecht	14
6	(Slovenia) Lasko	12
7	(Russia) Tyumen	14
8	(Indonesia) Jakarta	14

=== 2014 ===
Stages	Host	Events
1	(France) Paris	14
2	(Netherlands) Almere	14
3	(Slovenia) Lasko	14
4	(Indonesia) Jakarta	13
5	(Japan) Okinawa	14
6	(Turkey) Istanbul	14
7	(Germany) Hanau	14
8	(Austria) Salzburg	14

=== 2015 ===
Stages	Host	Events
1	(France) Paris	14
2	(Netherlands) Almere	14
3	(Egypt) El Sheikh	14
4	(Brazil) São Paulo	14
5	(Turkey) Istanbul	14
6	(Germany) Coburg	14
7	(Austria) Salzburg	14
8	(Japan) Okinawa	14

=== 2016 ===
Stages	Host	Events
1	(France) Paris	14
2	(Egypt) El Sheikh	14
3	(Slovenia) Lasko	12
4	(Netherlands) Rotterdam	14
5	(United Arab Emirates) Dubai	14
6	(Austria) Salzburg	14
7	(Morocco) Rabat	14
8	(Turkey) Istanbul	14
9	(Brazil) Fortaleza	13
10	(Germany) Hamburg	14
11	(Japan) Okinawa	14

=== 2017 ===
Stages	Host	Events
1	(France) Paris	14
2	(Netherlands) Rotterdam	14
3	(United Arab Emirates) Dubai	14
4	(Morocco) Rabat	14
5	(Germany) Halle/Leipzig	14

=== 2018 ===
Stages	Host	Events
1	(France) Paris	14
2	(United Arab Emirates) Dubai	14
3	(Netherlands) Rotterdam	14
4	(Morocco) Rabat	14
5	(Turkey) Istanbul	14
6	(Germany) Berlin	14
7	(Japan) Tokyo	14

=== 2019 ===
Stages	Host	Events
1	(France) Paris	14
2	(United Arab Emirates) Dubai	14
3	(Morocco) Rabat	14
4	(China) Shanghai	14
5	(Japan) Tokyo	14
6	(Russia) Moscow	14
7	(Spain) Madrid	14

=== 2020 ===
Stages	Host	Events
1	(France) Paris	14
2	(United Arab Emirates) Dubai	14
7	(Austria) Salzburg	14

=== 2021 ===
Stages	Host	Events
1	(Turkey) Istanbul	14
2	(Portugal) Lisbon	14
3	(Uzbekistan) Tashkent	14
4	(Russia) Moscow	14
5	(Morocco) Rabat	14

=== 2022 ===
Stages	Host	Events
1	(Azerbaijan) Baku	

=== 2023 ===
Stages	Host	Events
1	(Republic of Ireland) Dublin	

== See also ==
- Karate1 Youth League
- Karate1 Series A
