= 2013 Karate1 Premier League =

International karate competition series

The Karate 1 – Premier League 2013 is a series of international karate competitions organized by the World Karate Federation (WKF) during the year 2013.The series includes several stages of the Premier League circuit, as well as Karate World Cup tournaments. It features top-level karate athletes from around the world competing in kata and kumite events.

This series is considered one of the most important in international karate, contributing to the global ranking of athletes.

== Events ==
Karate 1 – Premier League 2013
Stages	Date	Series	City	Country
1	19–20 January 2013	Premier League – Paris	Paris	France
2	9–10 March 2013	Premier League – Dordrecht	Dordrecht	Netherlands
3	16–17 March 2013	World Cup – Laško	Laško	Slovenia
4	13–14 April 2013	Premier League – Tyumen	Tyumen	Russia
5	22–23 June 2013	Premier League – Jakarta	Jakarta	Indonesia
6	7–9 September 2013	Premier League – Istanbul	Istanbul	Turkey
7	21–22 September 2013	Premier League – Frankfurt / Hanau	Frankfurt / Hanau	Germany
8	30 November – 1 December 2013	Premier League – Salzburg	Salzburg	Austria

== Karate 1 Premier League - Paris 2013 ==
The Karate 1 Premier League – Paris 2013 was held on 19–20 January 2013 in Paris, France.

=== Men ===
Event	Gold	Silver	Bronze
Individual kata	Arslan Çalışkan; Turkey	Dejan Pajkić; Serbia	Miguel Galindo; Venezuela
Individual kata	Arslan Çalışkan; Turkey	Dejan Pajkić; Serbia	André Vieira; Portugal
Team kata	France; Zemouri Ahmed; Leitao Adrien; Jeannot Lucas	Turkey; Sofuoglu Metin; Duman Orcun; Çalışkan Arslan	Germany; Agsten Kristian; Glaser Jonas; Urke Jan
Team kata	France; Zemouri Ahmed; Leitao Adrien; Jeannot Lucas	Turkey; Sofuoglu Metin; Duman Orcun; Çalışkan Arslan	Spain; José Manuel Carbonell López; Jesús Quinto Barberán; Sergio Zamorano Merino
Kumite -60 kg	Sofiane Agoudgil; France	Abdelkrim Bouamria; Algeria	Vitalie Certan; Portugal
Kumite -60 kg	Sofiane Agoudgil; France	Abdelkrim Bouamria; Algeria	Elmehdi Benrouida; Morocco
Kumite -67 kg	Mathieu Cossou; France	Marvin Garin; France	Logan Da Costa; France
Kumite -67 kg	Mathieu Cossou; France	Marvin Garin; France	Ömer Kemaloğlu; Turkey
Kumite -75 kg	Yassine El Ourga; Morocco	Vitalii Vasilov; Russia	Abdourhamane Drame; France
Kumite -75 kg	Yassine El Ourga; Morocco	Vitalii Vasilov; Russia	Nuno Moreira; Portugal
Kumite -84 kg	Gogita Arkania; Georgia	Filipe Reis; Portugal	Jordan Laugier; France
Kumite -84 kg	Gogita Arkania; Georgia	Filipe Reis; Portugal	Nika Tsurtsumia; Germany
Kumite +84 kg	Salim Bendiab; France	Lonni Boulesnane; France	Enes Erkan; Turkey
Kumite +84 kg	Salim Bendiab; France	Lonni Boulesnane; France	Moreno Sheppard; Netherlands

=== Women ===
Event	Gold	Silver	Bronze
Individual kata	Sarah Sayed; Egypt	Cathaysa Barroso; Spain	Ilaria Melmer; Luxembourg
Individual kata	Sarah Sayed; Egypt	Cathaysa Barroso; Spain	Sandy Scordo; France
Team kata	Venezuela; Laura Jorgensen; Glorianny Rondon; Geris Vizcaya	Italy; Chiara Zucchi; Martina Russi; Giulia Bertagna	Belarus; Aliaksandra Fursava; Maryia Fursava; Anastasiya Smaliakova
Kumite -50 kg	Alexandra Recchia; France	Cheili Carolina González Castillo; Guatemala	Bettina Plank; Austria
Kumite -50 kg	Alexandra Recchia; France	Cheili Carolina González Castillo; Guatemala	Mariya Koulinkovitch; Belarus
Kumite -55 kg	Lucie Ignace; France	Valéria Kumizaki; Brazil	Man Sum Ma; Hong Kong
Kumite -55 kg	Lucie Ignace; France	Valéria Kumizaki; Brazil	Jennifer Warling; Luxembourg
Kumite -61 kg	Leila Heurtault; France	Nesrine Kherrar; Algeria	Noémi Kornfeld; Switzerland
Kumite -61 kg	Leila Heurtault; France	Nesrine Kherrar; Algeria	Stefanie Kaup; Austria
Kumite -68 kg	Alisa Buchinger; Austria	Inga Sherozia; Russia	Laury Vogelzang; Netherlands
Kumite -68 kg	Alisa Buchinger; Austria	Inga Sherozia; Russia	Lamya Matoub; France
Kumite +68 kg	Masa Martinovic; Croatia	Helena Kuusisto; Finland	Vasiliki Panetsidou; Greece
Kumite +68 kg	Masa Martinovic; Croatia	Helena Kuusisto; Finland	Pegah Zangeneh Karkooti; Iran

== Karate 1 Premier League - Dordrecht 2013 ==
The Karate 1 Premier League – Dordrecht 2013 was held on 9–10 March 2013 in Dordrecht, Netherlands.

=== Men ===
Event	Gold	Silver	Bronze
Individual kata	Damián Hugo Quintero Capdevila; Spain	Luca Brancaleon; Italy	Arslan Çalışkan; Turkey
Individual kata	Damián Hugo Quintero Capdevila; Spain	Luca Brancaleon; Italy	Pierre-Antoine Tresegnie; Belgium
Team kata	Spain; José Manuel Carbonell López; Damián Hugo Quintero Capdevila; Francisco José Salazar Jover	Egypt; Ahmed Mohamed Elswafy; Mostafa Ibrahim Khalil; Ahmed Ashraf Shawky	Austria; Christoph Erlenwein; Thomas Kaserer; Simon Klausberger
Team kata	Spain; José Manuel Carbonell López; Damián Hugo Quintero Capdevila; Francisco José Salazar Jover	Egypt; Ahmed Mohamed Elswafy; Mostafa Ibrahim Khalil; Ahmed Ashraf Shawky	Germany; Florian Genau; Philip Juettner; Jan Urke
Kumite -60 kg	Luca Maresca; Italy	Angelo Crescenzo; Italy	Alexander Heimann; Germany
Kumite -60 kg	Luca Maresca; Italy	Angelo Crescenzo; Italy	Kalvis Kalniņš; Latvia
Kumite -67 kg	Magdy Hanafy; Egypt	Redouane Kousseksou; Morocco	Ahmed Naser Rady Ramadan; Egypt
Kumite -67 kg	Magdy Hanafy; Egypt	Redouane Kousseksou; Morocco	Marvin Garin; France
Kumite -75 kg	Stanislav Horuna; Ukraine	Noah Bitsch; Germany	Logan Da Costa; France
Kumite -75 kg	Stanislav Horuna; Ukraine	Noah Bitsch; Germany	Thomas Scott; United States
Kumite -84 kg	Hany Shaker Keshta; Egypt	Timothy Petersen; Netherlands	Adham Mahmoud Sabri Hussein; Egypt
Kumite -84 kg	Hany Shaker Keshta; Egypt	Timothy Petersen; Netherlands	Tamer Abdelrouf Mourssy; Egypt
Kumite +84 kg	Mohamed Mohanad Magdy; Egypt	Salim Bendiab; France	Moreno Sheppard; Netherlands
Kumite +84 kg	Mohamed Mohanad Magdy; Egypt	Salim Bendiab; France	Ibrahim Gary; France

=== Women ===
Event	Gold	Silver	Bronze
Individual kata	Emma Lucraft; England	Mai Salama; Egypt	Sarah Aly; Egypt
Individual kata	Emma Lucraft; England	Mai Salama; Egypt	Randa Abdelaziz; Egypt
Team kata	Germany; Sabine Schneider; Denise Pawlowsky; Franziska Krieg	Egypt; Randa Abdelaziz; Mai Salama; Shaimaa Solyman	Belarus; Anastasiya Chuprys; Yauheniya Azarko; Sviatlana Yermakova
Team kata	Germany; Sabine Schneider; Denise Pawlowsky; Franziska Krieg	Egypt; Randa Abdelaziz; Mai Salama; Shaimaa Solyman	Belarus; Anastasiya Smaliakova; Maryia Fursava; Aliaksandra Fursava
Kumite -50 kg	Bettina Plank; Austria	Areeg Said Youssef Rashed; Egypt	Alexandra Recchia; France
Kumite -50 kg	Bettina Plank; Austria	Areeg Said Youssef Rashed; Egypt	Mariya Koulinkovitch; Belarus
Kumite -55 kg	Yasmin Attia; Egypt	Jana Vojtíkevičová; Slovakia	Bettina Alstadsæther; Norway
Kumite -55 kg	Yasmin Attia; Egypt	Jana Vojtíkevičová; Slovakia	Dhouha Ben Othmen; Tunisia
Kumite -61 kg	Silvia Sperner; Germany	Lucile Breton; France	Stefanie Kaup; Austria
Kumite -61 kg	Silvia Sperner; Germany	Lucile Breton; France	Halyna Melnyk; Ukraine
Kumite -68 kg	Vasiliki Panetsidou; Greece	Gitte Brunstad; Norway	Inga Sherozia; Russia
Kumite -68 kg	Vasiliki Panetsidou; Greece	Gitte Brunstad; Norway	Sandra Metzger; Hungary
Kumite +68 kg	Shymaa Mohaned Alsayed; Egypt	Dominika Tatarova; Slovakia	Vanesa Nortan; Netherlands
Kumite +68 kg	Shymaa Mohaned Alsayed; Egypt	Dominika Tatarova; Slovakia	Ciska van der Voort; Netherlands

== Karate 1 World Cup – Thermana-Lasko 2013 ==
The Karate 1 World Cup – Thermana-Lasko 2013 was held on 16–17 March 2013 in Lasko, Slovenia.

=== Men ===
Event	Gold	Silver	Bronze
Individual kata	Cleiver Casanova; Venezuela	Luca Brancaleon; Italy	Ivan Ermenc; Croatia
Individual kata	Cleiver Casanova; Venezuela	Luca Brancaleon; Italy	Christopher Rohde Skotte; Denmark
Kumite -60 kg	Luca Maresca; Italy	Stjepan Besenić; Croatia	Senthilkumaran Selvarajoo; Malaysia
Kumite -60 kg	Luca Maresca; Italy	Stjepan Besenić; Croatia	Govinash Rajakumar; Malaysia
Kumite -67 kg	Jozo Dabović; Montenegro	Suad Tabaković; Bosnia and Herzegovina	Vladimir Kalashnikov; Russia
Kumite -67 kg	Jozo Dabović; Montenegro	Suad Tabaković; Bosnia and Herzegovina	Thomas Kaserer; Austria
Kumite -75 kg	Filip Španbauer; Slovenia	Matúš Lieskovský; Slovakia	Nikola Jovanović; Serbia
Kumite -75 kg	Filip Španbauer; Slovenia	Matúš Lieskovský; Slovakia	Necati Pınarbaşı; Turkey
Kumite -84 kg	Yavuz Karamollaoğlu; Turkey	Gökhan Gündüz; Turkey	Danilo Lučić; Montenegro
Kumite -84 kg	Yavuz Karamollaoğlu; Turkey	Gökhan Gündüz; Turkey	Juš Markač; Slovenia
Kumite +84 kg	Almir Cecunanjin; Montenegro	Aleksandar Šestakov; Serbia	Vinko Uršić Glavanović; Croatia
Kumite +84 kg	Almir Cecunanjin; Montenegro	Aleksandar Šestakov; Serbia	Yaser Şahintekin; Turkey

=== Women ===
Event	Gold	Silver	Bronze
Individual kata	Vlatka Kiuk; Croatia	Terryana D'Onofrio; Italy	Katarína Longová; Slovakia
Individual kata	Vlatka Kiuk; Croatia	Terryana D'Onofrio; Italy	Francesca Reale; Italy
Kumite -50 kg	Lucia Kováčiková; Slovakia	Ana Drašković; Montenegro	Nur Eleena Ab Malik; Malaysia
Kumite -50 kg	Lucia Kováčiková; Slovakia	Ana Drašković; Montenegro	Dougmay Camacaro; Venezuela
Kumite -55 kg	Jana Vojtíkevičová; Slovakia	Ingrid Suchánková; Slovakia	Nisha Alagasan; Malaysia
Kumite -55 kg	Jana Vojtíkevičová; Slovakia	Ingrid Suchánková; Slovakia	Jennifer Warling; Luxembourg
Kumite -61 kg	Mirsada Suljkanović; Bosnia and Herzegovina	Ivana Bebek; Croatia	Jelena Maksimović; Montenegro
Kumite -61 kg	Mirsada Suljkanović; Bosnia and Herzegovina	Ivana Bebek; Croatia	Sanja Cvrkota; Serbia
Kumite -68 kg	Inga Sherozia; Russia	Kamila Warda; Poland	Giulia Bernardi; Italy
Kumite -68 kg	Inga Sherozia; Russia	Kamila Warda; Poland	Yoly Guillen; Venezuela
Kumite +68 kg	Masa Martinovic; Croatia	Chiara Zuanon; Italy	Dragana Konjević; Montenegro
Kumite +68 kg	Masa Martinovic; Croatia	Chiara Zuanon; Italy	Aleksandra Mijić; Serbia

== Karate 1 Premier League - Tyumen 2013 ==
The Karate 1 Premier League – Tyumen 2013 was held on 13–14 April 2013 in Tyumen, Russia.

=== Men ===
Event	Gold	Silver	Bronze
Individual kata	Egypt; Mostafa Ibrahim Khalil	Egypt; Ahmed Ashraf Shawky	Hong Kong; Chi Ming Lau
Individual kata	Egypt; Mostafa Ibrahim Khalil	Egypt; Ahmed Ashraf Shawky	Egypt; Ibrahim Magdy Moussa
Team kata	Egypt; Mostafa Ibrahim Khalil; Ibrahim Magdy Moussa; Ahmed Ashraf Shawky	Turkey; Arslan Çalışkan; Orcun Duman; Metin Sofuoğlu	South Africa; Stef Biagioni; Silvio Cerone-Biagioni; Marius Madgwick
Team kata	Egypt; Mostafa Ibrahim Khalil; Ibrahim Magdy Moussa; Ahmed Ashraf Shawky	Turkey; Arslan Çalışkan; Orcun Duman; Metin Sofuoğlu	Russia; Maksim Ksenofontov; Alexander Rusanov; Emil Skovorodnikov
Kumite -60 kg	Russia; Evgenii Alekhin	Egypt; Mohamed Aly	Kazakhstan; Darkhan Assadilov
Kumite -60 kg	Russia; Evgenii Alekhin	Egypt; Mohamed Aly	Turkey; Aykut Kaya
Kumite -67 kg	Azerbaijan; Rafiz Hasanov	Egypt; Magdy Hanafy	Russia; Albert Budaev
Kumite -67 kg	Azerbaijan; Rafiz Hasanov	Egypt; Magdy Hanafy	Russia; Viacheslav Kraynyuk
Kumite -75 kg	Azerbaijan; Rafael Aghayev	Ukraine; Stanislav Horuna	Russia; Aleksandr Shcherban
Kumite -75 kg	Azerbaijan; Rafael Aghayev	Ukraine; Stanislav Horuna	Turkey; Serkan Yağcı
Kumite -84 kg	Greece; Michail-Georgios Tzanos	Egypt; Hany Shaker Keshta	Azerbaijan; Asiman Gurbanli
Kumite -84 kg	Greece; Michail-Georgios Tzanos	Egypt; Hany Shaker Keshta	Georgia; Gogita Arkania
Kumite +84 kg	Russia; Mikhail Davydov	Azerbaijan; Shahin Atamov	Ukraine; Yevhen Motovylin
Kumite +84 kg	Russia; Mikhail Davydov	Azerbaijan; Shahin Atamov	Russia; Ilya Azingareev

=== Women ===
Event	Gold	Silver	Bronze
Individual kata	Pui Ki Li; Hong Kong	Sarah Sayed; Egypt	Sviatlana Yermakova; Belarus
Individual kata	Pui Ki Li; Hong Kong	Sarah Sayed; Egypt	Randa Abdelaziz; Egypt
Team kata	Egypt; Randa Abdelaziz; Mai Salama; Shaimaa Solyman	Belarus; Yauheniya Azarko; Anastasiya Chuprys; Sviatlana Yermakova	Russia; Kristina Apanasenko; Kristina Bolshakova; Ekaterina Kolotenkova
Team kata	Egypt; Randa Abdelaziz; Mai Salama; Shaimaa Solyman	Belarus; Yauheniya Azarko; Anastasiya Chuprys; Sviatlana Yermakova	Belarus; Aliaksandra Fursava; Maryia Fursava; Anastasiya Smaliakova
Kumite -50 kg	Russia; Elena Ponomareva	Italy; Giorgia Gargano	Belarus; Mariya Koulinkovitch
Kumite -50 kg	Russia; Elena Ponomareva	Italy; Giorgia Gargano	Austria; Bettina Plank
Kumite -55 kg	Egypt; Yassmin Attia	Luxembourg; Jennifer Warling	Egypt; Aya Naser Mohamed
Kumite -55 kg	Egypt; Yassmin Attia	Luxembourg; Jennifer Warling	Ukraine; Zhanna Melnyk
Kumite -61 kg	Russia; Olga Malofeeva	Russia; Alfina Khaliullina	Ukraine; Anita Serogina
Kumite -61 kg	Russia; Olga Malofeeva	Russia; Alfina Khaliullina	Russia; Olga Stepanova
Kumite -68 kg	Austria; Alisa Buchinger	Russia; Inga Sheroziya	Russia; Anastasia Gudilova
Kumite -68 kg	Austria; Alisa Buchinger	Russia; Inga Sheroziya	Kazakhstan; Guzaliya Gafurova
Kumite +68 kg	Croatia; Masa Martinovic	Russia; Ivanna Zaytseva	Egypt; Shaymaa Mohamed Alsayed
Kumite +68 kg	Croatia; Masa Martinovic	Russia; Ivanna Zaytseva	Russia; Vera Kovaleva

== Karate 1 Premier League - Jakarta 2013 ==
The Karate 1 Premier League – Jakarta 2013 was held on 22–23 June 2013 in Jakarta, Indonesia.

=== Men ===
Event	Gold	Silver	Bronze
Individual kata	Indonesia; Faizal Zainuddin	Austria; Thomas Kaserer	Malaysia; Tze Wai Leong
Individual kata	Indonesia; Faizal Zainuddin	Austria; Thomas Kaserer	Indonesia; Putu Yoga Yudistira
Team kata	Malaysia; Lim Chee Wei; Emmanuel Leong Theng Kuang; Leong Tze Wai	Indonesia; Giovanni Indra Maulana; Irvan Ramadhan; Sandi Wirawan	Indonesia; Faizal Zainuddin; Aswar; Fidelys Lolobua
Team kata	Malaysia; Lim Chee Wei; Emmanuel Leong Theng Kuang; Leong Tze Wai	Indonesia; Giovanni Indra Maulana; Irvan Ramadhan; Sandi Wirawan	Vietnam; Nguyen Thanh Long; Pham Thai Huy; Pham Truong An
Kumite -60 kg	Imam Tauhid Ragananda; Indonesia	Govinash Rajakumar; Malaysia	Lakanathan Kunasilan; Malaysia
Kumite -60 kg	Imam Tauhid Ragananda; Indonesia	Govinash Rajakumar; Malaysia	Erick Figuera; Venezuela
Kumite -67 kg	Tsuneari Yahiro; Australia	Sharmendran Raghonathan; Malaysia	Shaharudin Jamaludin; Malaysia
Kumite -67 kg	Tsuneari Yahiro; Australia	Sharmendran Raghonathan; Malaysia	Stefan Pokorny; Austria
Kumite -75 kg	Jayaraman Sharrma; Malaysia	Sergiy Mykhaylenko; Australia	Ka Wai Lee; Hong Kong
Kumite -75 kg	Jayaraman Sharrma; Malaysia	Sergiy Mykhaylenko; Australia	Alexander Nicastro; Venezuela
Kumite -84 kg	Hendro Salim; Indonesia	Zurab Gabelia; Russia	Cesar Herrera; Venezuela
Kumite -84 kg	Hendro Salim; Indonesia	Zurab Gabelia; Russia	Georgi Georgieff; Australia
Kumite +84 kg	Angel Aponte; Venezuela	Angel Georgieff; Australia	Mei-Yung Liu; Chinese Taipei
Kumite +84 kg	Angel Aponte; Venezuela	Angel Georgieff; Australia	George-Isac Caesar; Indonesia

=== Women ===
Event	Gold	Silver	Bronze
Individual kata	Vietnam; Do Thi Thu Ha	Vietnam; Nguyen Thi Hang	Malaysia; Celine Xin Yi Lee
Individual kata	Vietnam; Do Thi Thu Ha	Vietnam; Nguyen Thi Hang	Hong Kong; Grace Mo Sheung Lau
Team kata	Indonesia; Siti Maryam; Eva Fitria Setiawati; Ayu Rachmawati	Vietnam; Nguyen Thanh Hang; Do Thi Thu Ha; Nguyen Thi Ha Giang	Indonesia; Dewi Prasetya Kurniawan; Maria Ulfah; Prima Jeihen Putri Mayangsari
Team kata	Indonesia; Siti Maryam; Eva Fitria Setiawati; Ayu Rachmawati	Vietnam; Nguyen Thanh Hang; Do Thi Thu Ha; Nguyen Thi Ha Giang	Indonesia; Triwulan Mei Sudiani; Sulhadra; Ririn Krisnasari Seroh
Kumite -50 kg	Austria; Bettina Plank	Indonesia; Srunita Sari Sukatendel	Australia; Maria Alexiadis
Kumite -50 kg	Austria; Bettina Plank	Indonesia; Srunita Sari Sukatendel	Hong Kong; Yee Ting Tsang
Kumite -55 kg	Chinese Taipei; Wen Tzu-Yun	Malaysia; Nisha Alagasan	Slovakia; Jana Vojtíkevičová
Kumite -55 kg	Chinese Taipei; Wen Tzu-Yun	Malaysia; Nisha Alagasan	Indonesia; Fitrianingsih Nurhadiyanti
Kumite -61 kg	Malaysia; Shakila Salni Jefry Krishnan	Indonesia; Intan Nurjanah	Russia; Olga Stepanova
Kumite -61 kg	Malaysia; Shakila Salni Jefry Krishnan	Indonesia; Intan Nurjanah	Indonesia; Agung Sanistyarani Cok Istri
Kumite -68 kg	Omaira Molina; Venezuela	Alisa Buchinger; Austria	Inga Sheroziya; Russia
Kumite -68 kg	Omaira Molina; Venezuela	Alisa Buchinger; Austria	Shree Sharmini Segaran; Malaysia
Kumite +68 kg	Slovakia; Dominika Tatarova	Indonesia; Wiwi Pertiwi	Venezuela; Yeisy Pina
Kumite +68 kg	Slovakia; Dominika Tatarova	Indonesia; Wiwi Pertiwi	New Zealand; Charlotte Munro

== Karate1 Premier League - Istanbul 2013 ==
The Karate 1 Premier League – Istanbul 2013 was held on 7 September 2013 in Istanbul, Turkey.

=== Men ===
Event	Gold	Silver	Bronze
Individual kata	Ilja Smorguner; Germany	Farid Haghighi; Iran	Saied Salman Abdulhusain; Kuwait
Individual kata	Ilja Smorguner; Germany	Farid Haghighi; Iran	Sayed Mohammad Abdulhusain; Kuwait
Team kata	Iran; Farzad Mohammad Khanloo; Ahad Shahin Haragh; Armin Roushani Oskouez	Turkey; Metin Sofuoğlu; Arslan Çalışkan; Ali Sofuoğlu	Germany; Florian Genau; Philip Juettner; Jan Urke
Team kata	Iran; Farzad Mohammad Khanloo; Ahad Shahin Haragh; Armin Roushani Oskouez	Turkey; Metin Sofuoğlu; Arslan Çalışkan; Ali Sofuoğlu	Iran; Farid Haghighi; Amir Yariashlaghi; Morteza Hassanzadeh
Kumite -60 kg	Hamoon Derafshipour; Iran	Kalvis Kalniņš; Latvia	David Tskebuchava; Georgia
Kumite -60 kg	Hamoon Derafshipour; Iran	Kalvis Kalniņš; Latvia	Luca Maresca; Italy
Kumite -67 kg	Ali Abdulaziz; Kuwait	Hossein Samandarzavieh; Iran	Arvin Bagheri Ghaziani; Iran
Kumite -67 kg	Ali Abdulaziz; Kuwait	Hossein Samandarzavieh; Iran	Rafiz Hasanov; Azerbaijan
Kumite -75 kg	Bahman Asgari Ghoncheh; Iran	Saeid Hassanipour; Iran	Erman Eltemur; Turkey
Kumite -75 kg	Bahman Asgari Ghoncheh; Iran	Saeid Hassanipour; Iran	Lee Ka Wai; Hong Kong
Kumite -84 kg	Gökhan Gündüz; Turkey	Zabihollah Poorshab; Iran	Gogita Arkania; Georgia
Kumite -84 kg	Gökhan Gündüz; Turkey	Zabihollah Poorshab; Iran	Aykhan Mamayev; Azerbaijan
Kumite +84 kg	Sajjad Ganjzadeh; Iran	Rıdvan Kaptan; Turkey	Zharko Arsovski; North Macedonia
Kumite +84 kg	Sajjad Ganjzadeh; Iran	Rıdvan Kaptan; Turkey	Shahin Atamov; Azerbaijan

=== Women ===
Event	Gold	Silver	Bronze
Individual kata	Emma Lucraft; Belgium	Negin Bagheri Bazardeh; Iran	Terryana D'Onofrio; Italy
Individual kata	Emma Lucraft; Belgium	Negin Bagheri Bazardeh; Iran	Christine Heinrich; Germany
Team kata	Germany; Jasmin Bleul; Christine Heinrich; Sophie Wachter	Iran; Mahnaz Akhondzadeh; Soudabeh Ghasemi; Parvaneh Ghasemi	North Macedonia; Puliksenija Jovanoska; Marija Matrakoska; Zorica Spirkoska
Team kata	Germany; Jasmin Bleul; Christine Heinrich; Sophie Wachter	Iran; Mahnaz Akhondzadeh; Soudabeh Ghasemi; Parvaneh Ghasemi	Belarus; Aliaksandra Fursava; Maryia Fursava; Anastasiya Smaliakova
Kumite -50 kg	Gabriela Bruna; Chile	Serap Özçelik; Turkey	Bettina Plank; Austria
Kumite -50 kg	Gabriela Bruna; Chile	Serap Özçelik; Turkey	Sahar Karaji; Iran
Kumite -55 kg	Dhouha Ben Othman; Tunisia	Valéria Kumizaki; Brazil	Jennifer Warling; Luxembourg
Kumite -55 kg	Dhouha Ben Othman; Tunisia	Valéria Kumizaki; Brazil	Shima Alesaadi; Iran
Kumite -61 kg	Rozita Alipourkeshka; Iran	Delaram Dousti; Iran	Nicole Forcella; Italy
Kumite -61 kg	Rozita Alipourkeshka; Iran	Delaram Dousti; Iran	Aleksandra Stubleva; Bulgaria
Kumite -68 kg	Alisa Buchinger; Austria	Gitte Brunstad; Norway	Vasiliki Panetsidou; Greece
Kumite -68 kg	Alisa Buchinger; Austria	Gitte Brunstad; Norway	Pegah Zangeneh Karkooti; Iran
Kumite +68 kg	Masa Martinovic; Croatia	Dominika Tatarova; Slovakia	Faten Aissa; Tunisia
Kumite +68 kg	Masa Martinovic; Croatia	Dominika Tatarova; Slovakia	Vera Kovaleva; Russia

== Karate 1 Premier League – Frankfurt / Hanau 2013 ==
The Karate 1 Premier League – Frankfurt / Hanau 2013 was held on 21 September 2013 in Frankfurt and Hanau, Germany.

=== Men ===
Event	Gold	Silver	Bronze
Individual kata	Ryō Kiyuna; Japan	Issei Shimbaba; Japan	Ilja Smorguner; Germany
Individual kata	Ryō Kiyuna; Japan	Issei Shimbaba; Japan	Mattia Busato; Italy
Team kata	Japan; Ryuta Kinjo; Ryusei Kiyuna; Ryo Kiyuna Uemura	Spain; José Manuel Carbonell López; Damián Hugo Quintero Capdevila; Francisco José Salazar Jover	Austria; Christoph Erlenwein; Thomas Kaserer; Simon Klausberger
Team kata	Japan; Ryuta Kinjo; Ryusei Kiyuna; Ryo Kiyuna Uemura	Spain; José Manuel Carbonell López; Damián Hugo Quintero Capdevila; Francisco José Salazar Jover	Germany; Florian Genau; Philip Juettner; Jan Urke
Kumite -60 kg	Geoffrey Berens; Netherlands	Kalvis Kalniņš; Latvia	Luca Maresca; Italy
Kumite -60 kg	Geoffrey Berens; Netherlands	Kalvis Kalniņš; Latvia	Oleg Filippovich; Ukraine
Kumite -67 kg	Marvin Garin; France	Andrés Madera; Venezuela	Daniel Viveros; Ecuador
Kumite -67 kg	Marvin Garin; France	Andrés Madera; Venezuela	Gianluca De Vivo; Italy
Kumite -75 kg	Stanislav Horuna; Ukraine	Noah Bitsch; Germany	René Smaal; Netherlands
Kumite -75 kg	Stanislav Horuna; Ukraine	Noah Bitsch; Germany	Matúš Lieskovský; Slovakia
Kumite -84 kg	Ryutaro Araga; Japan	Nika Tsurtsumia; Germany	Hadysson Riou; France
Kumite -84 kg	Ryutaro Araga; Japan	Nika Tsurtsumia; Germany	Miloš Jovanović; Serbia
Kumite +84 kg	Moreno Sheppard; Netherlands	Salim Bendiab; France	Alejandro Mellado; Chile
Kumite +84 kg	Moreno Sheppard; Netherlands	Salim Bendiab; France	Andrei Grinevich; Belarus

=== Women ===
Event	Gold	Silver	Bronze
Individual kata	Rimi Kajikawa; Japan	Thi Hang Nguyen; Vietnam	Emiri Iwamoto; Japan
Individual kata	Rimi Kajikawa; Japan	Thi Hang Nguyen; Vietnam	Christine Heinrich; Germany
Team kata	Germany; Jasmin Bleul; Christine Heinrich; Sophie Wachter	Germany; Katharina Albers; Nadine Beinvohl; Laura Kirchner	France; Sophie Chaboisseau; Marie Delhumeau; Camille Pelatan
Team kata	Germany; Jasmin Bleul; Christine Heinrich; Sophie Wachter	Germany; Katharina Albers; Nadine Beinvohl; Laura Kirchner	Belarus; Aliaksandra Fursava; Maryia Fursava; Anastasiya Smaliakova
Kumite -50 kg	Bettina Plank; Austria	Hikaru Ohno; Japan	Roxane Côté; Canada
Kumite -50 kg	Bettina Plank; Austria	Hikaru Ohno; Japan	Gabriela Bruna; Chile
Kumite -55 kg	Jana Bitsch; Germany	Yuri Kaneko; Japan	Alessandra Hasani; Italy
Kumite -55 kg	Jana Bitsch; Germany	Yuri Kaneko; Japan	Zuzana Schwartzova; Slovakia
Kumite -61 kg	Ingrida Suchankova; Slovakia	Nicole Forcella; Italy	Nele De Vos; Belgium
Kumite -61 kg	Ingrida Suchankova; Slovakia	Nicole Forcella; Italy	Anita Serogina; Ukraine
Kumite -68 kg	Azra Sales; Croatia	Gitte Brunstad; Norway	Alisa Buchinger; Austria
Kumite -68 kg	Azra Sales; Croatia	Gitte Brunstad; Norway	Natalia Brozulatto; Brazil
Kumite +68 kg	Ayumi Uekusa; Japan	Masa Martinovic; Croatia	Vanesa Tania Nortan; Netherlands
Kumite +68 kg	Ayumi Uekusa; Japan	Masa Martinovic; Croatia	Fanny Clavien; Switzerland

== Karate 1 Premier League –Salzburg 2013 ==
The Karate 1 Premier League –Salzburg 2013 was held from 30 November to 1 December 2013 in Salzburg, Austria.

=== Men ===
Event	Gold	Silver	Bronze
Individual kata	Minh Dack; France	Enzo Montarello; France	Gabriele Petroni; Italy
Individual kata	Minh Dack; France	Enzo Montarello; France	Peter Fabian; Slovakia
Team kata	Croatia; Ivan Ermenc; Franjo Maškarin; Damjan Padovan	France; Lucas Jeannot; Geoffroy Monin; Ahmed Zemouri	Italy; Riccardo Losi; Alan Garda; Oscar Pe
Team kata	Croatia; Ivan Ermenc; Franjo Maškarin; Damjan Padovan	France; Lucas Jeannot; Geoffroy Monin; Ahmed Zemouri	Austria; Simon Klausberger; Thomas Kaserer; Christoph Erlenwein
Kumite -60 kg	Emil Pavlov; North Macedonia	Angelo Crescenzo; Italy	Johan Lopes; France
Kumite -60 kg	Emil Pavlov; North Macedonia	Angelo Crescenzo; Italy	Oleg Filippovich; Ukraine
Kumite -67 kg	Stefan Pokorny; Austria	Redouan Kousseksou; Morocco	Norbert Szilva; Hungary
Kumite -67 kg	Stefan Pokorny; Austria	Redouan Kousseksou; Morocco	Yves Martial Tadissi; Hungary
Kumite -75 kg	Goran Lucin; Croatia	Stanislav Horuna; Ukraine	Alton Brown; England
Kumite -75 kg	Goran Lucin; Croatia	Stanislav Horuna; Ukraine	Logan Da Costa; France
Kumite -84 kg	Ahmed Solyman; Egypt	Gökhan Gündüz; Turkey	Berat Jakupi; North Macedonia
Kumite -84 kg	Ahmed Solyman; Egypt	Gökhan Gündüz; Turkey	Gogita Arkania; Georgia
Kumite +84 kg	Salim Bendiab; France	Slobodan Bitevic; Serbia	Haris Sujković; Bosnia and Herzegovina
Kumite +84 kg	Salim Bendiab; France	Slobodan Bitevic; Serbia	Ivan Zoričić; Croatia

=== Women ===
Event	Gold	Silver	Bronze
Individual kata	Sandy Scordo; France	Emiri Iwamoto; Japan	Serena Bonuccelli; Italy
Individual kata	Sandy Scordo; France	Emiri Iwamoto; Japan	Terryana D'Onofrio; Italy
Team kata	Serbia; Dunja Zeravčić; Ivana Stepanović; Milana Jakšić	Belarus; Anastasiya Smaliakova; Maryia Fursava; Aliaksandra Fursava	Belarus; Sviatlana Yermakova; Nadzeya Herashchanka; Anastasiya Chuprys
Team kata	Serbia; Dunja Zeravčić; Ivana Stepanović; Milana Jakšić	Belarus; Anastasiya Smaliakova; Maryia Fursava; Aliaksandra Fursava	Germany; Marina Albers; Marie-Susanne Beinvohl; Lisa-Marie Kirchner
Kumite -50 kg	Bettina Plank; Austria	Kateryna Kryva; Ukraine	Jusleen Virk; Canada
Kumite -50 kg	Bettina Plank; Austria	Kateryna Kryva; Ukraine	Alexandra Recchia; France
Kumite -55 kg	Valéria Kumizaki; Brazil	Émilie Thouy; France	Alessandra Hasani; Italy
Kumite -55 kg	Valéria Kumizaki; Brazil	Émilie Thouy; France	Sara Cardin; Italy
Kumite -61 kg	Ana Lenard; Croatia	Sanja Cvetkota; Serbia	Stephanie Kaup; Austria
Kumite -61 kg	Ana Lenard; Croatia	Sanja Cvetkota; Serbia	Natalie Williams; England
Kumite -68 kg	Alisa Buchinger; Austria	Ivona Tubić; Croatia	Kate Karwacinski; England
Kumite -68 kg	Alisa Buchinger; Austria	Ivona Tubić; Croatia	Azra Sales; Croatia
Kumite +68 kg	Fanny Clavien; Switzerland	Vanesa Tania Nortan; Netherlands	Dominika Tatarova; Slovakia
Kumite +68 kg	Fanny Clavien; Switzerland	Vanesa Tania Nortan; Netherlands	Anne-Laure Florentin; France
