= Cossou =

Cossou is a French surname. Notable people with the surname include:

- Guillaume Cossou (born 1979), French karateka
- Lucien Cossou (born 1936), French footballer
- Mathieu Cossou (born 1985), French karateka
