= 2011 Karate1 Premier League =

International karate competition series

The Karate 1 – Premier League 2011 is a series of international karate competitions organized by the World Karate Federation (WKF) during the year 2011. The series formed part of the official international circuit for elite karate athletes competing in kata and kumite disciplines.

== Events ==
Stages	Series	Date	City	Country
1	Karate1 - Paris 2011	15 to 16 January 2011	Paris	France
2	Karate 1 – Istanbul 2011	17 to 18 September 2011	Istanbul	Turkey
3	Karate 1 – Salzburg 2011	12 to 13 November 2011	Salzburg	Austria

== Karate1 - Paris 2011 ==
The Karate 1 – Paris 2011 was held from 15 to 16 January 2011 in Paris, France.

=== Men ===
Event	Gold	Silver	Bronze
Individual kata	Antonio Díaz; Venezuela	Vu Duc Minh Dack; France	Mattia Busato; Italy
Individual kata	Antonio Díaz; Venezuela	Vu Duc Minh Dack; France	Itaru Oki; Japan
Kumite -60 kg	Amir Mehdizadeh; Iran	Kalvis Kalniņš; Latvia	Sofiane Ainine; France
Kumite -60 kg	Amir Mehdizadeh; Iran	Kalvis Kalniņš; Latvia	Johan Lopes; France
Kumite -67 kg	Jean Peña; Venezuela	William Rolle; France	Thomas Kaserer; Austria
Kumite -67 kg	Jean Peña; Venezuela	William Rolle; France	Anthony Gillet; France
Kumite -75 kg	Kenji Grillon; France	Saeid Hassanipour; Iran	Nabil Kherfi; France
Kumite -75 kg	Kenji Grillon; France	Saeid Hassanipour; Iran	Hiroto Shinohara; Japan
Kumite -84 kg	Gogita Arkania; Georgia	Timothy Petersen; Netherlands	Jean-Christophe Taumotekava; France
Kumite -84 kg	Gogita Arkania; Georgia	Timothy Petersen; Netherlands	Mickaël Serfati; France
Kumite +84 kg	Martin Nestorovski; North Macedonia	Nadir Benaissa; France	Hamadini Missipsa; Algeria
Kumite +84 kg	Martin Nestorovski; North Macedonia	Nadir Benaissa; France	Florian Malguy; France

=== Women ===
Event	Gold	Silver	Bronze
Individual kata	Sandy Scordo; France	Kazuyo Inoue; Japan	Sarah Aly; Egypt
Individual kata	Sandy Scordo; France	Kazuyo Inoue; Japan	Randa Abdelaziz; Egypt
Kumite -50 kg	Emilie Thouy; France	Betty Aquilina; France	Marilena Rubini-Volante; Switzerland
Kumite -50 kg	Emilie Thouy; France	Betty Aquilina; France	Laura Contreras; Mexico
Kumite -55 kg	Maeva Samy; France	Ryo Fujii; Japan	Jacqueline Factos; Ecuador
Kumite -55 kg	Maeva Samy; France	Ryo Fujii; Japan	Lorena Mendoza; Mexico
Kumite -61 kg	Lamya Matoub; France	Yu Miyamoto; Japan	Alisa Buchinger; Austria
Kumite -61 kg	Lamya Matoub; France	Yu Miyamoto; Japan	Lucie Ignace; France
Kumite -68 kg	Tiffany Fanjat; France	Sonia Fromager; France	Vasiliki Panetsidou; Greece
Kumite -68 kg	Tiffany Fanjat; France	Sonia Fromager; France	Cristina Vizcaíno-González; Spain
Kumite +68 kg	Nadège Aït-Ibrahim; France	Ruth Soufflet; France	Ciska van der Voort; Netherlands
Kumite +68 kg	Nadège Aït-Ibrahim; France	Ruth Soufflet; France	Vanesca Nortan; Netherlands

== Karate 1 – Istanbul 2011 ==
The Karate 1 – Istanbul 2011 was held from 17 to 18 September 2011 in Istanbul, Turkey.

=== Men ===
Event	Gold	Silver	Bronze
Individual kata	Antonio Díaz; Venezuela	Vladimír Míček; Czech Republic	Ali Sofuoğlu; Turkey
Individual kata	Antonio Díaz; Venezuela	Vladimír Míček; Czech Republic	Mehran Ghorbanalipour; Iran
Team kata	Indonesia; Aswar Aswar; Faizal Zainudin; Fidelys Lolobua	Egypt; Mahmoud Elsayed; Seif Orabi; Mohamed Sayed	Russia; Ilya Kucherov; Maxim Ksenofontov; Nikita Bakanov
Team kata	Indonesia; Aswar Aswar; Faizal Zainudin; Fidelys Lolobua	Egypt; Mahmoud Elsayed; Seif Orabi; Mohamed Sayed	Turkey; Metin Sofuoğlu; Orçun Duman; Alsan Çalışkan
Kumite -60 kg	Mohamed Aly; Egypt	İsmail Arapoğlu; Turkey	Eyüp Güler; Turkey
Kumite -60 kg	Mohamed Aly; Egypt	İsmail Arapoğlu; Turkey	Andrey Aktauov; Kazakhstan
Kumite -67 kg	Ömer Kemaloğlu; Turkey	Freddy Ichane; France	Mathieu Cossou; France
Kumite -67 kg	Ömer Kemaloğlu; Turkey	Freddy Ichane; France	William Rolle; France
Kumite -75 kg	Serxan Yağcı; Turkey	Kenji Grillon; France	Nabil Kherfi; France
Kumite -75 kg	Serxan Yağcı; Turkey	Kenji Grillon; France	Abdourahmane Dramé; France
Kumite -84 kg	Timothy Petersen; Netherlands	Tarek Abdesselem; France	Murat Salih Kurnaz; Turkey
Kumite -84 kg	Timothy Petersen; Netherlands	Tarek Abdesselem; France	Ognen Gruevski; North Macedonia
Kumite +84 kg	Ibrahim Gary; France	Enes Erkan; Turkey	Nadir Benaiss; France
Kumite +84 kg	Ibrahim Gary; France	Enes Erkan; Turkey	Rıdvan Kaptan; Turkey

=== Women ===
Event	Gold	Silver	Bronze
Individual kata	Sandy Scordo; France	Kazuyo Inoue; Japan	Sarah Aly; Egypt
Individual kata	Sandy Scordo; France	Kazuyo Inoue; Japan	Randa Abdelaziz; Egypt
Team kata	Indonesia; Dewi Prasetya; Sisilia Agustiani Ora; Syafrudin Yuliunti	Egypt; Noha Abdelkader; Nyreen Ahmed; Ihaima Roshdy	Turkey; Kübra Kahvecioğlu; Bigem Giroğlu; Hazel Kıratlı
Team kata	Indonesia; Dewi Prasetya; Sisilia Agustiani Ora; Syafrudin Yuliunti	Egypt; Noha Abdelkader; Nyreen Ahmed; Ihaima Roshdy	Turkey; Gizem Şahin; Rabia Küsmüs; Hazel Kıratlı
Kumite -50 kg	Bettina Plank; Austria	Alexandra Recchia; France	Serap Özçelik; Turkey
Kumite -50 kg	Bettina Plank; Austria	Alexandra Recchia; France	Asunur Yıldırımer; Turkey
Kumite -55 kg	Lucie Ignace; France	Aya Zeinhom; Egypt	Jacqueline Factos; Ecuador
Kumite -55 kg	Lucie Ignace; France	Aya Zeinhom; Egypt	Natasa Ilievska; North Macedonia
Kumite -61 kg	Lolita Dona; France	Alisa Buchinger; Austria	Merve Çoban; Turkey
Kumite -61 kg	Lolita Dona; France	Alisa Buchinger; Austria	Tugba Tek; Turkey
Kumite -68 kg	Vasiliki Panetsidou; Greece	Fatma Reda; Egypt	Meltem Hocaoğlu; Turkey
Kumite -68 kg	Vasiliki Panetsidou; Greece	Fatma Reda; Egypt	Lucélia Ribeiro; Brazil
Kumite +68 kg	Eleni Chatziliadou; Greece	Olivia Grant; Canada	Hüsniye Güler; Turkey
Kumite +68 kg	Eleni Chatziliadou; Greece	Olivia Grant; Canada	Jeanis Colzani; Brazil

== Karate 1 – Salzburg 2011 ==
The Karate 1 – Salzburg 2011 was held from 12 to 13 November 2011 in Salzburg, Austria.

=== Men ===
Event	Gold	Silver	Bronze
Individual kata	Antonio Díaz; Venezuela	Cleiver Casanova; Venezuela	Vu Duc Minh Dack; France
Individual kata	Antonio Díaz; Venezuela	Cleiver Casanova; Venezuela	Luca Brancaleon; Italy
Team kata	Egypt; Ahmed Magdy Ibrahim; Mostafa Ibrahim Khalil; Ahmed Ashraf Shawky	Austria; Vincent Auinger; Thomas Kaserer; Simon Klausberger	Germany; Kristian Agsten; Jan Urke; Leon Woldt
Team kata	Egypt; Ahmed Magdy Ibrahim; Mostafa Ibrahim Khalil; Ahmed Ashraf Shawky	Austria; Vincent Auinger; Thomas Kaserer; Simon Klausberger	Croatia; Ivan Ermenc; Franjo Maskarin; Damjan Padovan
Kumite -60 kg	Mohamed Gamal Aly; Egypt	Oleg Filipovych; Ukraine	Giuseppe Francesco Strano; Italy
Kumite -60 kg	Mohamed Gamal Aly; Egypt	Oleg Filipovych; Ukraine	Ji Hwan Lee; South Korea
Kumite -67 kg	Mohamed Amine Hasnaoui; Tunisia	Salvatore Serino; Italy	William Rolle; France
Kumite -67 kg	Mohamed Amine Hasnaoui; Tunisia	Salvatore Serino; Italy	Ahmed Elsayed Elshafei; Egypt
Kumite -75 kg	Luigi Busà; Italy	Ahmed Gamaleldin Solyman; Egypt	Nikola Jovanović; Serbia
Kumite -75 kg	Luigi Busà; Italy	Ahmed Gamaleldin Solyman; Egypt	Stanislav Horuna; Ukraine
Kumite -84 kg	Hany Shaker Keshta; Egypt	Nello Maestri; Italy	Timothy Petersen; Netherlands
Kumite -84 kg	Hany Shaker Keshta; Egypt	Nello Maestri; Italy	Yaroslav Horuna; Ukraine
Kumite +84 kg	Almir Cecunjanin; Montenegro	Ossama Abdelaziz Mansour; Egypt	Martin Nestorovski; North Macedonia
Kumite +84 kg	Almir Cecunjanin; Montenegro	Ossama Abdelaziz Mansour; Egypt	Ibrahim Gary; France

=== Women ===
Event	Gold	Silver	Bronze
Individual kata	Rika Usami; Japan	Kazuyo Inoue; Japan	Sandy Scordo; France
Individual kata	Rika Usami; Japan	Kazuyo Inoue; Japan	Veronika Mišková; Czech Republic
Team kata	Croatia; Petra Krivičić; Vlatka Kiuk; Marijana Kiuk	Egypt; Randa Atef Abdelaziz; Nehal Mohamed Ashkar; Mai Gamal Salama	Italy; Alberta Diocleziano; Simona Pucci; Giulia Talesco
Team kata	Croatia; Petra Krivičić; Vlatka Kiuk; Marijana Kiuk	Egypt; Randa Atef Abdelaziz; Nehal Mohamed Ashkar; Mai Gamal Salama	Serbia; Danijela Janjić; Katarina Piperin; Bojana Stanković
Kumite -50 kg	Alexandra Recchia; France	So-Young Jang; South Korea	Branka Aranđelović; Serbia
Kumite -50 kg	Alexandra Recchia; France	So-Young Jang; South Korea	Bettina Plank; Austria
Kumite -55 kg	Lucie Ignace; France	Natasha Ilievska; North Macedonia	Anzhelika Terliuga; Ukraine
Kumite -55 kg	Lucie Ignace; France	Natasha Ilievska; North Macedonia	Nadia Ahmed Abdel Monem; Egypt
Kumite -61 kg	Laura Pasqua; Italy	Alisa Buchinger; Austria	Jana Gfeller; Switzerland
Kumite -61 kg	Laura Pasqua; Italy	Alisa Buchinger; Austria	Lolita Dona; France
Kumite -68 kg	Ivona Tubić; Croatia	Tiffany Fanjat; France	Sonia Fromager; France
Kumite -68 kg	Ivona Tubić; Croatia	Tiffany Fanjat; France	Azra Sales; Croatia
Kumite +68 kg	Maša Martinovac; Croatia	Greta Vitelli; Italy	Zeinab Elmitwalli Koutb; Egypt
Kumite +68 kg	Maša Martinovac; Croatia	Greta Vitelli; Italy	Ruth Soufflet; France
