= Farid Haghighi =

Iranian karateka

- Born: 2 December 1989 (age 36); Tehran, Iran
- Style: Kata
- Teachers: Bahram Azizi & Amir Yari
- Rank: Black belt, 5th dan

Farid Haghighi
Medal record

Representing Iran

Kata Men's Karate

Youth Asian Championships
| Silver medal – second place | 2006 singapore | Individual Kata |

Youth Asian Championships
| Bronze medal – third place | 2008 malesia | Individual Kata |

Youth World Championships
| Silver medal – second place | 2007 Turkey | Individual Kata |

World universial championships
| Bronze medal – third place | 2010 Montenegro | Team kata |
| Gold medal – first place | 2014 Montenegro | Team kata |

Karate1 Premier League
| Bronze medal – third place | 2012 Turkey | Individual Kata |
| Silver medal – second place | 2013 Turkey | Individual Kata |

Asian club Championships
| Silver medal – second place | 2015 Uzbekistan | Individual Kata |

Farid Haghighi (Persian: فرید حقیقی, also Romanized as "Fa'rīd Haghighī"; born December 2, 1989 in Tehran) is an Iranian karateka. He also won the silver medal in World Karate Championships in 2007 and Bronze medal 2012 and Silver medal 2013 Karate1 Premier League. He began Karate training at age 8 with his first coach Bahram Azizi And since 2003 under the supervision of Amir Yari he has continued the sport. He is the first men's medalist at the Kata World Championships in Iran.
