= 2020 Karate1 Premier League =

The Karate 1 – Premier League 2020 is a series of international karate competitions organized by the World Karate Federation (WKF) during the year 2020. The series consists of multiple stages held in different countries as part of the Premier League circuit and brings together the world's top karate athletes competing in both kata and kumite disciplines.

== Events ==
Karate 1 – Premier League 2020
Stages	Date	Series	City	Country
1	24–26 January 2020	Premier League – Paris	Paris	France
2	14–16 February 2020	Premier League – Dubai	Dubai	United Arab Emirates
3	28 February – 1 March 2020	Premier League – Salzburg	Salzburg	Austria

== Karate1 Premier League - Paris 2020 ==
The Karate 1 Premier League – Paris 2020 was held from 24 to 26 January 2020 in Paris, France.

=== Men ===
Event	Gold	Silver	Bronze
Individual kata	Ryo Kiyuna; Japan	Damian Hugo Quintero Capdevila; Spain	Ali Sofuoglu; Turkey
Individual kata	Ryo Kiyuna; Japan	Damian Hugo Quintero Capdevila; Spain	Kazumasa Moto; Japan
Kumite -60 kg	Eray Samdan; Turkey	Darkhan Assadilov; Kazakhstan	Oussama Edari; Morocco
Kumite -60 kg	Eray Samdan; Turkey	Darkhan Assadilov; Kazakhstan	Christos-Stefanos Xenos; Greece
Kumite -67 kg	Steven Da Costa; France	Luca Maresca; Italy	Rafiz Hasanov; Azerbaijan
Kumite -67 kg	Steven Da Costa; France	Luca Maresca; Italy	Yanis Lamotte; France
Kumite -75 kg	Bahman Asgari Ghoncheh; Iran	Logan Da Costa; France	Joaquin Gonzalez Lavin; Chile
Kumite -75 kg	Bahman Asgari Ghoncheh; Iran	Logan Da Costa; France	Luigi Busa; Italy
Kumite -84 kg	Mohamed Ramadan; Egypt	Ryutaro Araga; Japan	Wu Chun-Wei; Chinese Taipei
Kumite -84 kg	Mohamed Ramadan; Egypt	Ryutaro Araga; Japan	Ugur Aktas; Turkey
Kumite +84 kg	Gogita Arkania; Georgia	Dnylson Jacquet; France	Saleh Abazari; Iran
Kumite +84 kg	Gogita Arkania; Georgia	Dnylson Jacquet; France	Jonathan Horne; Germany
Team kata	Turkey; Ali Sofuoglu; Enes Ozdemir; Emre Vefa Goktas	Spain; Jose Manuel Carbonell Lopez; Alejandro Manzana Diaz; Sergio Galan Lopez	Italy; Giuseppe Panagia; Alessandro Iodice; Gianluca Gallo
Team kata	Turkey; Ali Sofuoglu; Enes Ozdemir; Emre Vefa Goktas	Spain; Jose Manuel Carbonell Lopez; Alejandro Manzana Diaz; Sergio Galan Lopez	Morocco; Bilal Benkacem; Mohammed El Hanni; Adnane El Hakimi

=== Women ===
Event	Gold	Silver	Bronze
Individual kata	Sandra Sánchez Jaime; Spain	Viviana Bottaro; Italy	Kiyou Shimizu; Japan
Individual kata	Sandra Sánchez Jaime; Spain	Viviana Bottaro; Italy	Hikaru Ono; Japan
Kumite -50 kg	Serap Özçelik Arapoğlu; Turkey	Miho Miyahara; Japan	Junna Tsukii; Philippines
Kumite -50 kg	Serap Özçelik Arapoğlu; Turkey	Miho Miyahara; Japan	Radwa Sayed; Egypt
Kumite -55 kg	Anna Chernysheva; Russia	Anzhelika Terliuga; Ukraine	Tzu-Yun Wen; Chinese Taipei
Kumite -55 kg	Anna Chernysheva; Russia	Anzhelika Terliuga; Ukraine	Carlota Fernandez Osorio; Spain
Kumite -61 kg	Merve Coban; Turkey	Xiaoyan Yin; China	Leila Heurtault; France
Kumite -61 kg	Merve Coban; Turkey	Xiaoyan Yin; China	Gwendoline Philippe; France
Kumite -68 kg	Irina Zaretska; Azerbaijan	Feryal Abdelaziz; Egypt	Alisa Buchinger; Austria
Kumite -68 kg	Irina Zaretska; Azerbaijan	Feryal Abdelaziz; Egypt	Li Gong; China
Kumite +68 kg	Hamideh Abbasali; Iran	Meltem Hocaoğlu Akyol; Turkey	Anne-Laure Florentin; France
Kumite +68 kg	Hamideh Abbasali; Iran	Meltem Hocaoğlu Akyol; Turkey	Sohila Abouismail; Egypt
Team kata	Spain; Raquel Roy Rubio; Lidia Rodriguez Encabo; Marta Vega Letamendi	Italy; Terryana D'Onofrio; Michela Pezzetti; Carola Casale	Morocco; Aya En-Nesyry; Lamyae Bertali; Sanae Agalmam
Team kata	Spain; Raquel Roy Rubio; Lidia Rodriguez Encabo; Marta Vega Letamendi	Italy; Terryana D'Onofrio; Michela Pezzetti; Carola Casale	Russia; Polina Kotlyarova; Irina Troitskaya; Mariia Zotova

== Karate1 Premier League - Dubai 2020 ==
The Karate 1 Premier League – Dubai 2020 was held from 14 to 16 February 2020 in Dubai, United Arab Emirates.

=== Men ===
Event	Gold	Silver	Bronze
Individual kata	Damian Hugo Quintero Capdevila; Spain	Antonio Diaz; Venezuela	Enes Ozdemir; Turkey
Individual kata	Damian Hugo Quintero Capdevila; Spain	Antonio Diaz; Venezuela	Mattia Busato; Italy
Kumite -60 kg	Angelo Crescenzo; Italy	Darkhan Assadilov; Kazakhstan	Orges Arifi; Albania
Kumite -60 kg	Angelo Crescenzo; Italy	Darkhan Assadilov; Kazakhstan	Christos-Stefanos Xenos; Greece
Kumite -67 kg	Steven Da Costa; France	Vinicius Figueira; Brazil	Supa Ngamphuengphit; Thailand
Kumite -67 kg	Steven Da Costa; France	Vinicius Figueira; Brazil	Burak Uygur; Turkey
Kumite -75 kg	Rafael Aghayev; Azerbaijan	Luigi Busa; Italy	Abdalla Abdelaziz; Egypt
Kumite -75 kg	Rafael Aghayev; Azerbaijan	Luigi Busa; Italy	Bahman Asgari Ghoncheh; Iran
Kumite -84 kg	Zabihollah Poorshab; Iran	Daniyar Yuldashev; Kazakhstan	Mahdi Khodabakhshi; Iran
Kumite -84 kg	Zabihollah Poorshab; Iran	Daniyar Yuldashev; Kazakhstan	Farouk Abdesselam; France
Kumite +84 kg	Jonathan Horne; Germany	Gogita Arkania; Georgia	Dnylson Jacquet; France
Kumite +84 kg	Jonathan Horne; Germany	Gogita Arkania; Georgia	Tareg Hamedi; Saudi Arabia
Team kata	Kuwait; Sayed Mohammed Almosawi; Sayed Salman Almosawi; Mohammad Hussain	Spain; Jose Manuel Carbonell Lopez; Alejandro Manzana Diaz; Sergio Galan Lopez	Egypt; Youssef Hammad; Islam Hassan; Zeyad Mohamed
Team kata	Kuwait; Sayed Mohammed Almosawi; Sayed Salman Almosawi; Mohammad Hussain	Spain; Jose Manuel Carbonell Lopez; Alejandro Manzana Diaz; Sergio Galan Lopez	Russia; Maksim Ksenofontov; Mehman Rzaev; Emil Skovorodnikov

=== Women ===
Event	Gold	Silver	Bronze
Individual kata	Sandra Sánchez Jaime; Spain	Sakura Kokumai; United States	Dilara Eltemur; Turkey
Individual kata	Sandra Sánchez Jaime; Spain	Sakura Kokumai; United States	Grace Lau Mo Sheung; Hong Kong
Kumite -50 kg	Serap Özçelik Arapoğlu; Turkey	Nadia Gomez Morales; Spain	Sara Bahmanyar; Iran
Kumite -50 kg	Serap Özçelik Arapoğlu; Turkey	Nadia Gomez Morales; Spain	Bettina Plank; Austria
Kumite -55 kg	Anzhelika Terliuga; Ukraine	Yassmin Attia; Egypt	Jana Messerschmidt; Germany
Kumite -55 kg	Anzhelika Terliuga; Ukraine	Yassmin Attia; Egypt	Tuba Yakan; Turkey
Kumite -61 kg	Xiaoyan Yin; China	Shima Alesaadi; Iran	Giana Lotfy; Egypt
Kumite -61 kg	Xiaoyan Yin; China	Shima Alesaadi; Iran	Rozita Alipourkeshka; Iran
Kumite -68 kg	Li Gong; China	Feryal Abdelaziz; Egypt	Irina Zaretska; Azerbaijan
Kumite -68 kg	Li Gong; China	Feryal Abdelaziz; Egypt	Elena Quirici; Switzerland
Kumite +68 kg	Meltem Hocaoğlu Akyol; Turkey	Shymaa Abouel Yazed; Egypt	Laura Palacio Gonzalez; Spain
Kumite +68 kg	Meltem Hocaoğlu Akyol; Turkey	Shymaa Abouel Yazed; Egypt	Menna Shaaban Okila; Egypt
Team kata	Italy; Terryana D'Onofrio; Michela Pezzetti; Carola Casale	Spain; Raquel Roy Rubio; Lidia Rodriguez Encabo; Marta Vega Letamendi	Australia; Mishela Dimoska; Marijana Dimoska; Kiriana Kamcheska
Team kata	Italy; Terryana D'Onofrio; Michela Pezzetti; Carola Casale	Spain; Raquel Roy Rubio; Lidia Rodriguez Encabo; Marta Vega Letamendi	Peru; Sol Maria Romani; Saida Karlen Salcedo Hermoza; Rosa Almarza

== Karate1 Premier League - Salzburg 2020 ==
The Karate 1 Premier League – Salzburg 2020 was held from 28 February to 1 March 2020 in Salzburg, Austria.

=== Men ===
Event	Gold	Silver	Bronze
Individual kata	Kazumasa Moto; Japan	Ali Sofuoglu; Turkey	Emre Vefa Goktas; Turkey
Individual kata	Kazumasa Moto; Japan	Ali Sofuoglu; Turkey	Damian Hugo Quintero Capdevila; Spain
Kumite -60 kg	Emil Pavlov; North Macedonia	Angelo Crescenzo; Italy	Darkhan Assadilov; Kazakhstan
Kumite -60 kg	Emil Pavlov; North Macedonia	Angelo Crescenzo; Italy	Eray Samdan; Turkey
Kumite -67 kg	Rafiz Hasanov; Azerbaijan	Luca Maresca; Italy	Mussa Bexultan; Kazakhstan
Kumite -67 kg	Rafiz Hasanov; Azerbaijan	Luca Maresca; Italy	Ali Elsawy; Egypt
Kumite -75 kg	Bahman Asgari Ghoncheh; Iran	Stanislav Horuna; Ukraine	Erman Eltemur; Turkey
Kumite -75 kg	Bahman Asgari Ghoncheh; Iran	Stanislav Horuna; Ukraine	Karoly Gabor Harspataki; Hungary
Kumite -84 kg	Ugur Aktas; Turkey	Ivan Kvesic; Croatia	Daniyar Yuldashev; Kazakhstan
Kumite -84 kg	Ugur Aktas; Turkey	Ivan Kvesic; Croatia	Kenji Grillon; France
Kumite +84 kg	Ryzvan Talibov; Ukraine	Brian Irr; United States	Tarek Mahmoud; Egypt
Kumite +84 kg	Ryzvan Talibov; Ukraine	Brian Irr; United States	Gogita Arkania; Georgia
Team kata	Turkey; Enes Ozdemir; Ali Sofuoglu; Emre Vefa Goktas	Italy; Giuseppe Panagia; Alessandro Iodice; Gianluca Gallo	Spain; Jose Manuel Carbonell Lopez; Alejandro Manzana Diaz; Sergio Galan Lopez
Team kata	Turkey; Enes Ozdemir; Ali Sofuoglu; Emre Vefa Goktas	Italy; Giuseppe Panagia; Alessandro Iodice; Gianluca Gallo	Kuwait; Mohammad Hussain; Sayed Salman Almosawi; Sayed Mohammed Almosawi

=== Women ===
Event	Gold	Silver	Bronze
Individual kata	Sandra Sánchez Jaime; Spain	Sakura Kokumai; United States	Grace Lau Mo Sheung; Hong Kong
Individual kata	Sandra Sánchez Jaime; Spain	Sakura Kokumai; United States	Hikaru Ono; Japan
Kumite -50 kg	Miho Miyahara; Japan	Nadia Gomez Morales; Spain	Alexandra Recchia; France
Kumite -50 kg	Miho Miyahara; Japan	Nadia Gomez Morales; Spain	Serap Özçelik Arapoğlu; Turkey
Kumite -55 kg	Sara Cardin; Italy	Jana Messerschmidt; Germany	Valeria Kumizaki; Brazil
Kumite -55 kg	Sara Cardin; Italy	Jana Messerschmidt; Germany	Tzu-Yun Wen; Chinese Taipei
Kumite -61 kg	Merve Coban; Turkey	Haya Jumaa; Canada	Xiaoyan Yin; China
Kumite -61 kg	Merve Coban; Turkey	Haya Jumaa; Canada	Giana Lotfy; Egypt
Kumite -68 kg	Li Gong; China	Feryal Abdelaziz; Egypt	Victoria Isaeva; Russia
Kumite -68 kg	Li Gong; China	Feryal Abdelaziz; Egypt	Irina Zaretska; Azerbaijan
Kumite +68 kg	Hamideh Abbasali; Iran	Clio Ferracuti; Italy	Sofya Berultseva; Kazakhstan
Kumite +68 kg	Hamideh Abbasali; Iran	Clio Ferracuti; Italy	Tzu-Hsuan Wen; Chinese Taipei
Team kata	Spain; Raquel Roy Rubio; Lidia Rodriguez Encabo; Marta Garcia Lozano	Belarus; Maryia Fursava; Katsiaryna Karatkevich; Aliaksandra Fursava	Italy; Terryana D'Onofrio; Michela Pezzetti; Carola Casale
Team kata	Spain; Raquel Roy Rubio; Lidia Rodriguez Encabo; Marta Garcia Lozano	Belarus; Maryia Fursava; Katsiaryna Karatkevich; Aliaksandra Fursava	Russia; Anfisa Gerasimova; Ekaterina Gorshunova; Daria Tuliakova
