= 2025 Karate1 Premier League =

The Karate 1 – Premier League 2025 is a series of international karate competitions organized by the World Karate Federation (WKF) during the year 2025. The series consists of multiple stages held in different countries as part of the Premier League circuit and brings together the world's top karate athletes competing in both kata and kumite disciplines.

== Events ==
Karate 1 – Premier League 2025
Stages	Date	Series	City	Country
1	24–26 January 2025	Premier League – Paris	Paris	France
2	14–16 March 2025	Premier League – Hangzhou	Hangzhou	China
3	18–20 April 2025	Premier League – Cairo	Cairo	Egypt
4	30 May – 1 June 2025	Premier League – Rabat	Rabat	Morocco

== Karate1 Premier League - Paris 2025 ==
The Karate 1 Premier League – Paris 2025 was held from 24 to 26 January 2025 in Paris, France.

=== Men ===
Event	Gold	Silver	Bronze
Individual kata	Nishiyama Kakeru; Japan	Machida Yasuhiro; Japan	Moto Kazumasa; Japan
Individual kata	Nishiyama Kakeru; Japan	Machida Yasuhiro; Japan	Torres Gutierrez Ariel; United States
Kumite -60 kg	Samdan Eray; Turkey	Xenos Christos-Stefanos; Greece	Alpysbay Kaisar; Kazakhstan
Kumite -60 kg	Samdan Eray; Turkey	Xenos Christos-Stefanos; Greece	Meskini Ali; Iran
Kumite -67 kg	Kozaki Yugo; Japan	Ozer Omer Abdurrahim; Turkey	Figueira Vinicius; Brazil
Kumite -67 kg	Kozaki Yugo; Japan	Ozer Omer Abdurrahim; Turkey	Baliotis Georgios; Greece
Kumite -75 kg	Abdelaziz Abdalla; Egypt	Mikulic Nemanja; Montenegro	Rahozenko Erik; Ukraine
Kumite -75 kg	Abdelaziz Abdalla; Egypt	Mikulic Nemanja; Montenegro	?
Kumite -84 kg	Badawy Youssef; Egypt	Aljafari Mohammad; Jordan	Eto Junya; Japan
Kumite -84 kg	Badawy Youssef; Egypt	Aljafari Mohammad; Jordan	Srti Mehdi; Morocco
Kumite 84+ kg	Mahmoud Taha Tarek; Egypt	Bostandzic Anes; Bosnia and Herzegovina	Anarbekov Dias; Kazakhstan
Kumite 84+ kg	Mahmoud Taha Tarek; Egypt	Bostandzic Anes; Bosnia and Herzegovina	Timmermans Rob; Curaçao

=== Women ===
Event	Gold	Silver	Bronze
Individual kata	Ono Maho; Japan	Lau Mo Sheung Grace; Hong Kong	Mishima Kiri; Japan
Individual kata	Ono Maho; Japan	Lau Mo Sheung Grace; Hong Kong	Azuma Saeko; Japan
Kumite -50 kg	Bahmanyar Sara; Iran	Mohsenian Masoumeh; Iran	Zhangbyrbay Moldir; Kazakhstan
Kumite -50 kg	Bahmanyar Sara; Iran	Mohsenian Masoumeh; Iran	Salazar Yorgelis; Venezuela
Kumite -55 kg	Youssef Ahlam; Egypt	Furumoto-Deshaies Hana; Canada	Yakan Tuba; Turkey
Kumite -55 kg	Youssef Ahlam; Egypt	Furumoto-Deshaies Hana; Canada	Allen Trinity; United States
Kumite -61 kg	Shimada Sarara; Japan	Kanay Assel; Kazakhstan	Girvica Beata; Latvia
Kumite -61 kg	Shimada Sarara; Japan	Kanay Assel; Kazakhstan	Yvon Sydney; France
Kumite -68 kg	Sombe Thalya; France	Kama Tsubasa; Japan	Quirici Elena; Switzerland
Kumite -68 kg	Sombe Thalya; France	Kama Tsubasa; Japan	Eltemur Eda; Turkey
Kumite 68+ kg	Torres Garcia Maria; Spain	Berultseva Sofya; Kazakhstan	Walters Rochelle; England
Kumite 68+ kg	Torres Garcia Maria; Spain	Berultseva Sofya; Kazakhstan	Eddarhri Maroua; Morocco

== Karate1 Premier League - Hangzhou 2025 ==
The Karate 1 Premier League – Hangzhou 2025 was held from 14 to 16 March 2025 in Hangzhou, China.

=== Men ===
Event	Gold	Silver	Bronze
Individual kata	Nishiyama Kakeru; Japan	Torres Gutierrez Ariel; United States	Moto Kazumasa; Japan
Individual kata	Nishiyama Kakeru; Japan	Torres Gutierrez Ariel; United States	Vu Anthony; Sweden
Kumite -60 kg	Samdan Eray; Turkey	Xenos Christos-Stefanos; Greece	Hashimoto Hiromu; Japan
Kumite -60 kg	Samdan Eray; Turkey	Xenos Christos-Stefanos; Greece	Meziane Rayyan; France
Kumite -67 kg	Oubaya Said; Morocco	Almasatfa Abdel Rahman; Jordan	Rzazade Nuran; Azerbaijan
Kumite -67 kg	Oubaya Said; Morocco	Almasatfa Abdel Rahman; Jordan	Shih Cheng-Chung; Chinese Taipei
Kumite -75 kg	Abdelaziz Abdalla; Egypt	Berthon Enzo; France	Aghayev Farid; Azerbaijan
Kumite -75 kg	Abdelaziz Abdalla; Egypt	Berthon Enzo; France	Asgari Ghoncheh Bahman; Iran
Kumite -84 kg	Badawy Youssef; Egypt	Aljafari Mohammad; Jordan	Khodabakhshi Mahdi; Iran
Kumite -84 kg	Badawy Youssef; Egypt	Aljafari Mohammad; Jordan	Shimada Rikito; Japan
Kumite 84+ kg	Gelashvili Merabi; Georgia	Abazari Saleh; Iran	Kvesic Andjelo; Croatia
Kumite 84+ kg	Gelashvili Merabi; Georgia	Abazari Saleh; Iran	Mahmoud Taha Tarek; Egypt

=== Women ===
Event	Gold	Silver	Bronze
Individual kata	Lau Mo Sheung Grace; Hong Kong	Ono Maho; Japan	Azuma Saeko; Japan
Individual kata	Lau Mo Sheung Grace; Hong Kong	Ono Maho; Japan	Mishima Kiri; Japan
Kumite -50 kg	Ouikene Cylia; Algeria	Zhangbyrbay Moldir; Kazakhstan	Perfetto Erminia; Italy
Kumite -50 kg	Ouikene Cylia; Algeria	Zhangbyrbay Moldir; Kazakhstan	Lahyanassa Yamina; Canada
Kumite -55 kg	Kodo Rina; Japan	Saadati Fatemeh; Iran	Allen Trinity; United States
Kumite -55 kg	Kodo Rina; Japan	Saadati Fatemeh; Iran	Goranova Ivet; Bulgaria
Kumite -61 kg	Golshadnezhad Atousa; Iran	Khamis Reem; Germany	Mahjoub Wafa; Tunisia
Kumite -61 kg	Golshadnezhad Atousa; Iran	Khamis Reem; Germany	Kanay Assel; Kazakhstan
Kumite -68 kg	Kama Tsubasa; Japan	Quirici Elena; Switzerland	Brouk Nisrine; Morocco
Kumite -68 kg	Kama Tsubasa; Japan	Quirici Elena; Switzerland	Eltemur Eda; Turkey
Kumite 68+ kg	Pea Clemence; France	Ferracuti Clio; Italy	Berultseva Sofya; Kazakhstan
Kumite 68+ kg	Pea Clemence; France	Ferracuti Clio; Italy	Torres Garcia Maria; Spain

== Karate1 Premier League - Cairo 2025 ==
The Karate 1 Premier League – Cairo 2025 was held from 18 to 20 April 2025 in Cairo, Egypt.

=== Men ===
Event	Gold	Silver	Bronze
Individual kata	Nishiyama Kakeru; Japan	Torres Gutierrez Ariel; United States	Moto Kazumasa; Japan
Individual kata	Nishiyama Kakeru; Japan	Torres Gutierrez Ariel; United States	Ohata Kotaro; Japan
Kumite -60 kg	Hashimoto Hiromu; Japan	Aly Ziad; Egypt	Meskini Ali; Iran
Kumite -60 kg	Hashimoto Hiromu; Japan	Aly Ziad; Egypt	Haas Florian; Germany
Kumite -67 kg	Oubaya Said; Morocco	Freire Fuentes Tomas; Chile	Baliotis Georgios; Greece
Kumite -67 kg	Oubaya Said; Morocco	Freire Fuentes Tomas; Chile	Ayoub Anis Helassa; Algeria
Kumite -75 kg	Abdelgawad Abdalla Hesham; Egypt	Zaplitnyi Andrii; Ukraine	Sakiyama Yusei; Japan
Kumite -75 kg	Abdelgawad Abdalla Hesham; Egypt	Zaplitnyi Andrii; Ukraine	Abdelaziz Abdalla; Egypt
Kumite -84 kg	Badawy Youssef; Egypt	Aljafari Mohammad; Jordan	Gasparian Eduard; Individual Neutral Athletes
Kumite -84 kg	Badawy Youssef; Egypt	Aljafari Mohammad; Jordan	Osman Omar; Egypt
Kumite 84+ kg	Mahmoud Taha Tarek; Egypt	Avanzini Matteo; Italy	Sekot Nikolai; Germany
Kumite 84+ kg	Mahmoud Taha Tarek; Egypt	Avanzini Matteo; Italy	Mori Yuta; Japan

=== Women ===
Event	Gold	Silver	Bronze
Individual kata	Lau Mo Sheung Grace; Hong Kong	Ono Maho; Japan	Marques Rita; Portugal
Individual kata	Lau Mo Sheung Grace; Hong Kong	Ono Maho; Japan	Garcia Lozano Paola; Spain
Kumite -50 kg	Zhangbyrbay Moldir; Kazakhstan	Sgardelli Ema; Croatia	Rodrigues Catarina; Portugal
Kumite -50 kg	Zhangbyrbay Moldir; Kazakhstan	Sgardelli Ema; Croatia	Salama Reem Ahmed; Egypt
Kumite -55 kg	Goranova Ivet; Bulgaria	Harada Akari; Japan	Sakiyama Tsumugi; Japan
Kumite -55 kg	Goranova Ivet; Bulgaria	Harada Akari; Japan	Yakan Tuba; Turkey
Kumite -61 kg	Sholohova Oleksandra; Ukraine	Kanay Assel; Kazakhstan	Tolba Rahma; Egypt
Kumite -61 kg	Sholohova Oleksandra; Ukraine	Kanay Assel; Kazakhstan	Aly Noursin; Egypt
Kumite -68 kg	Quirici Elena; Switzerland	Brouk Nisrine; Morocco	Riedel Hannah; Germany
Kumite -68 kg	Quirici Elena; Switzerland	Brouk Nisrine; Morocco	Schroeter Madeleine; Germany
Kumite 68+ kg	Mahgoub Haidi; Egypt	Okila Menna Shaaban; Egypt	Kneer Johanna; Germany
Kumite 68+ kg	Mahgoub Haidi; Egypt	Okila Menna Shaaban; Egypt	Orana Fortesa; Kosovo

== Karate1 Premier League - Rabat 2025 ==
The Karate 1 Premier League – Rabat 2025 was held from 30 May to 1 June 2025 in Rabat, Morocco.

=== Men ===
Event	Gold	Silver	Bronze
Individual kata	Nishiyama Kakeru; Japan	Torres Gutierrez Ariel; United States	Abe Sakichi; Japan
Individual kata	Nishiyama Kakeru; Japan	Torres Gutierrez Ariel; United States	Ohata Kotaro; Japan
Kumite -60 kg	Xenos Christos-Stefanos; Greece	Sordia Tsotne; Georgia	Samdan Eray; Turkey
Kumite -60 kg	Xenos Christos-Stefanos; Greece	Sordia Tsotne; Georgia	Aly Ziad; Egypt
Kumite -67 kg	Ghaith Afeef; Jordan	Kozaki Yugo; Japan	Elsawy Ali; Egypt
Kumite -67 kg	Ghaith Afeef; Jordan	Kozaki Yugo; Japan	Rzazade Nuran; Azerbaijan
Kumite -75 kg	Abdelaziz Abdalla; Egypt	Mahauden Quentin; Belgium	Zaplitnyi Andrii; Ukraine
Kumite -75 kg	Abdelaziz Abdalla; Egypt	Mahauden Quentin; Belgium	Yurur Omer Faruk; Turkey
Kumite -84 kg	Aljafari Mohammad; Jordan	Mastrogiannis Konstantinos; Greece	Martina Michele; Italy
Kumite -84 kg	Aljafari Mohammad; Jordan	Mastrogiannis Konstantinos; Greece	Sam Hamza; Morocco
Kumite 84+ kg	Avanzini Matteo; Italy	Mahmoud Taha Tarek; Egypt	Sagilyan Eduard; United States
Kumite 84+ kg	Avanzini Matteo; Italy	Mahmoud Taha Tarek; Egypt	Tesanovic Djordje; Serbia

=== Women ===
Event	Gold	Silver	Bronze
Individual kata	Lau Mo Sheung Grace; Hong Kong	Ono Maho; Japan	D'Onofrio Terryana; Italy
Individual kata	Lau Mo Sheung Grace; Hong Kong	Ono Maho; Japan	En-Nesyry Aya; Morocco
Kumite -50 kg	Perfetto Erminia; Italy	Pappa Christina Triada; Greece	Palashevska Yuliia; Ukraine
Kumite -50 kg	Perfetto Erminia; Italy	Pappa Christina Triada; Greece	Hubrich Shara; Germany
Kumite -55 kg	Toro Meneses Valentina; Chile	Ku Tsui-Ping; Chinese Taipei	Mukai Ruan; Japan
Kumite -55 kg	Toro Meneses Valentina; Chile	Ku Tsui-Ping; Chinese Taipei	Yakan Tuba; Turkey
Kumite -61 kg	Semenenko Anastasiia; Germany	Rodrigues Barbara; Brazil	Sombe Tricya; France
Kumite -61 kg	Semenenko Anastasiia; Germany	Rodrigues Barbara; Brazil	Aly Noursin; Egypt
Kumite -68 kg	Sombe Thalya; France	Hendy Hadir; Egypt	Kama Tsubasa; Japan
Kumite -68 kg	Sombe Thalya; France	Hendy Hadir; Egypt	Sieliemienieva Elina; Ukraine
Kumite 68+ kg	Torres Garcia Maria; Spain	Walters Rochelle; England	Kydonaki Kyriaki; Greece
Kumite 68+ kg	Torres Garcia Maria; Spain	Walters Rochelle; England	Gurung Arika; Nepal
