= Mohammad Hussain =

Mohammad or Muhammad Hussain may refer to:

- Mohammad Hussain (cricketer), former Pakistani Test cricketer
- Muhammad Hussain (islamist), American Islamist terrorist
- Mohammad Majid Hussain, Indian politician
- Mohammad Hussein Fadlallah (1935–2010), a Lebanese Twelver Shia Muslim Grand Ayatollah
- Muhammad Hussain (soldier) (1949–1971), Pakistani soldier awarded the Nishan-e-Haider
- Muhammad Hussain (baseball) (born 1997), Pakistani baseball player
- Muhammad Hussain Najafi (born 1932), Pakistani Twelver Shia Muslim, a Grand Ayatollah
- Mohammad Hussain Sarahang, Afghan musician
- Mohammad Hussain Talat, Pakistani first-class cricketer
- Mohammad Hussein, Jordanian basketball player
- Mohammad Hossain, Indian politician
- Muhammad Husain (born 1951), Malaysian politician
- Muhammad Ahmad Hussein, Grand Mufti of Jerusalem
- Mohamed Hussain, Maldivian footballer
- Mohammed Hussain, Indian field hockey and soccer player
- Mohamed Hussein, Egyptian swimmer
- Mohamed Husain, Bahraini footballer
- Mohamed Zurga (Mohamed Abdallah Hossein, born 1998), Sudanese footballer
- Mohammed Hosein (born 1938), West Indian cricket umpire

== See also ==
- Mohammad Mosharraf Hossain (disambiguation)
- Mohammed Mosharref Hossain
- Mohamed Husseini, Tanzanian football player
- Mohamed Hussein Ali, Kenyan politician
- Mohammed Hussein Ali, Kenyan military commander
- Muhammad Hussain Khan, Pakistani politician
- Hajji Mohammad Hossein Isfahani, Iranian architect and politician
