= 2026 Karate One Premier League =

The Karate One – Premier League 2026 is a series of international karate competitions organized by the World Karate Federation (WKF) during the year 2026. The series consists of multiple stages held in different countries as part of the Premier League circuit and brings together the world's top karate athletes competing in both kata and kumite disciplines.

== Events ==
Karate One – Premier League 2026
Stages	Date	Series	City	Country
1	23–25 January 2026	Premier League – Istanbul	Istanbul	Turkey
2	13–15 March 2026	Premier League – Rome	Rome	Italy
3	10–12 April 2026	Premier League – Leshan	Leshan	China
4	12–14 June 2026	Premier League – Rabat	Rabat	Morocco

== Karate One Premier League - Istanbul 2026 ==
The Karate One Premier League - Istanbul 2026 was held from 23 to 25 January 2026 in Istanbul, Türkiye.

=== Men ===
Event	Gold	Silver	Bronze
Individual kata	Nishiyama Kakeru; Japan	Moto Kazumasa; Japan	Torres Gutierrez Ariel; United States
Individual kata	Nishiyama Kakeru; Japan	Moto Kazumasa; Japan	Okamoto Ken; Japan
Kumite -60 kg	Samdan Eray; Turkey	Kilic Nuri; Turkey	Sabatino Christian; Italy
Kumite -60 kg	Samdan Eray; Turkey	Kilic Nuri; Turkey	Hammad Abdallah; Jordan
Kumite -67 kg	Ogannisian Iurik [[|]]	Baliotis Georgios; Greece	Almasatfa Abdel Rahman; Jordan
Kumite -67 kg	Ogannisian Iurik [[|]]	Baliotis Georgios; Greece	Maresca Luca; Italy
Kumite -75 kg	Abdelaziz Abdalla; Egypt	Yurur Omer Faruk; Turkey	Asgari Ghoncheh Bahman; Iran
Kumite -75 kg	Abdelaziz Abdalla; Egypt	Yurur Omer Faruk; Turkey	Sakiyama Yusei; Japan
Kumite -84 kg	Osman Omar; Egypt	Badawy Youssef; Egypt	Gasparian Eduard [[|]]
Kumite -84 kg	Osman Omar; Egypt	Badawy Youssef; Egypt	Aljafari Mohammad; Jordan
Kumite 84+ kg	Rojas Rodrigo; Chile	Mahmoud Taha Tarek; Egypt	Elmasry Ahmed; Egypt
Kumite 84+ kg	Rojas Rodrigo; Chile	Mahmoud Taha Tarek; Egypt	Kudzynau Ivan [[|]]

=== Women ===
Event	Gold	Silver	Bronze
Individual kata	Lau Mo Sheung Grace; Hong Kong	Ono Maho; Japan	Shimizu Natsuki; Japan
Individual kata	Lau Mo Sheung Grace; Hong Kong	Ono Maho; Japan	Iwatani Azuki; Japan
Kumite -50 kg	Nyman Agnes; Sweden	Hubrich Shara; Germany	Sgardelli Ema; Croatia
Kumite -50 kg	Nyman Agnes; Sweden	Hubrich Shara; Germany	Ouikene Cylia; Algeria
Kumite -55 kg	Samasheva Bella; Kazakhstan	Kvasnicova Nina; Slovakia	Elhayti Chaimae; Morocco
Kumite -55 kg	Samasheva Bella; Kazakhstan	Kvasnicova Nina; Slovakia	Kodo Rina; Japan
Kumite -61 kg	Yenen Fatma Naz; Turkey	Ajaray Maryam; Belgium	Otaboyeva Sevinch; Uzbekistan
Kumite -61 kg	Yenen Fatma Naz; Turkey	Ajaray Maryam; Belgium	Shimada Sarara; Japan
Kumite -68 kg	Brouk Nisrine; Morocco	Hendy Hadir; Egypt	Meshkova Aleksandra [[|]]
Kumite -68 kg	Brouk Nisrine; Morocco	Hendy Hadir; Egypt	Schroeter Madeleine; Germany
Kumite 68+ kg	Berultseva Sofya; Kazakhstan	Gurung Arika; Nepal	Golombos Nikolina; Croatia
Kumite 68+ kg	Berultseva Sofya; Kazakhstan	Gurung Arika; Nepal	Giamouki Theodosia; Cyprus

== Karate One Premier League - Rome 2026 ==
The Karate One Premier League - Rome 2026 was held from 13 to 15 March 2026 in Rome, Italy.

=== Men ===
Event	Gold	Silver	Bronze
Individual kata	Nishiyama Kakeru; Japan	Torres Gutierrez Ariel; United States	Ghinami Alessio; Italy
Individual kata	Nishiyama Kakeru; Japan	Torres Gutierrez Ariel; United States	Ohata Kotaro; Japan
Kumite -60 kg	Akhmedov Akhmed [[|]]	Hashimoto Hiromu; Japan	Abdikadyr Miras; Kazakhstan
Kumite -60 kg	Akhmedov Akhmed [[|]]	Hashimoto Hiromu; Japan	Halici Mert; Turkey
Kumite -67 kg	Kozaki Yugo; Japan	Omara Adel; Egypt	Rashidov Abdul Vakhkhob; Uzbekistan
Kumite -67 kg	Kozaki Yugo; Japan	Omara Adel; Egypt	Maresca Luca; Italy
Kumite -75 kg	Pitsul Heorhii; Ukraine	Mahauden Quentin; Belgium	De Vivo Daniele; Italy
Kumite -75 kg	Pitsul Heorhii; Ukraine	Mahauden Quentin; Belgium	Franken Ricardo; Netherlands
Kumite -84 kg	Fiore Matteo; Italy	Gasparian Eduard [[|]]	Shimada Rikito; Japan
Kumite -84 kg	Fiore Matteo; Italy	Gasparian Eduard [[|]]	Osman Omar; Egypt
Kumite 84+ kg	Kvesic Andjelo; Croatia	Mohamed ElHassan; Egypt	Avanzini Matteo; Italy
Kumite 84+ kg	Kvesic Andjelo; Croatia	Mohamed ElHassan; Egypt	Kudzynau Ivan [[|]]

=== Women ===
Event	Gold	Silver	Bronze
Individual kata	Lau Mo Sheung Grace; Hong Kong	Ono Maho; Japan	Garcia Lozano Paola; Spain
Individual kata	Lau Mo Sheung Grace; Hong Kong	Ono Maho; Japan	Mishima Kiri; Japan
Kumite -50 kg	Salazar Yorgelis; Venezuela	Ouikene Cylia; Algeria	Perfetto Erminia; Italy
Kumite -50 kg	Salazar Yorgelis; Venezuela	Ouikene Cylia; Algeria	Legittimo Ludovica; Italy
Kumite -55 kg	Sipovic Nejra; Bosnia and Herzegovina	Lallo Viola; Italy	Abouriche Louiza; Algeria
Kumite -55 kg	Sipovic Nejra; Bosnia and Herzegovina	Lallo Viola; Italy	Youssef Ahlam; Egypt
Kumite -61 kg	Shimada Sarara; Japan	Kanay Assel; Kazakhstan	Sipovic Emina; Bosnia and Herzegovina
Kumite -61 kg	Shimada Sarara; Japan	Kanay Assel; Kazakhstan	Mahjoub Wafa; Tunisia
Kumite -68 kg	Quirici Elena; Switzerland	Sombe Thalya; France	Zaretska Iryna; Azerbaijan
Kumite -68 kg	Quirici Elena; Switzerland	Sombe Thalya; France	Sieliemienieva Elina; Ukraine
Kumite 68+ kg	Berultseva Sofya; Kazakhstan	Walters Rochelle; England	Torres Garcia Maria; Spain
Kumite 68+ kg	Berultseva Sofya; Kazakhstan	Walters Rochelle; England	Kneer Johanna; Germany

== Karate One Premier League - Leshan 2026 ==
The Karate One Premier League - Leshan 2026 was held from 10 to 12 April 2026 in Leshan, China.

=== Men ===
Event	Gold	Silver	Bronze
Individual kata	Nishiyama Kakeru; Japan	Ohata Kotaro; Japan	Torres Gutierrez Ariel; United States
Individual kata	Nishiyama Kakeru; Japan	Ohata Kotaro; Japan	Moto Kazumasa; Japan
Kumite -60 kg	Kilic Nuri; Turkey	Hashimoto Hiromu; Japan	Hammad Abdallah; Jordan
Kumite -60 kg	Kilic Nuri; Turkey	Hashimoto Hiromu; Japan	Turakhonov Mekhriddin; Uzbekistan
Kumite -67 kg	Rashidov Abdul Vakhkhob; Uzbekistan	Maresca Luca; Italy	Altynbek Olzhas; Kazakhstan
Kumite -67 kg	Rashidov Abdul Vakhkhob; Uzbekistan	Maresca Luca; Italy	Almasatfa Abdel Rahman; Jordan
Kumite -75 kg	Bulut Enes; Turkey	Azhikanov Nurkanat; Kazakhstan	Sharafutdinov Ernest [[|]]
Kumite -75 kg	Bulut Enes; Turkey	Azhikanov Nurkanat; Kazakhstan	Mahauden Quentin; Belgium
Kumite -84 kg	Aljafari Mohammad; Jordan	Shimada Rikito; Japan	Gasparian Eduard [[|]]
Kumite -84 kg	Aljafari Mohammad; Jordan	Shimada Rikito; Japan	Martina Michele; Italy
Kumite 84+ kg	Rojas Rodrigo; Chile	Bostandzic Anes; Bosnia and Herzegovina	Ciani Michele; Italy
Kumite 84+ kg	Rojas Rodrigo; Chile	Bostandzic Anes; Bosnia and Herzegovina	Talibov Ryzvan; Ukraine

=== Women ===
Event	Gold	Silver	Bronze
Individual kata	Lau Mo Sheung Grace; Hong Kong	Ono Maho; Japan	Shimizu Natsuki; Japan
Individual kata	Lau Mo Sheung Grace; Hong Kong	Ono Maho; Japan	Mishima Kiri; Japan
Kumite -50 kg	Salazar Yorgelis; Venezuela	Ouikene Cylia; Algeria	Hubrich Shara; Germany
Kumite -50 kg	Salazar Yorgelis; Venezuela	Ouikene Cylia; Algeria	Ishihara Mizuki; Japan
Kumite -55 kg	Wei Yuchun; China	Dimova Valeriya [[|]]	Zviadauri Lizi; Georgia
Kumite -55 kg	Wei Yuchun; China	Dimova Valeriya [[|]]	Sipovic Nejra; Bosnia and Herzegovina
Kumite -61 kg	Gong Li; China	Kanay Assel; Kazakhstan	Shimada Sarara; Japan
Kumite -61 kg	Gong Li; China	Kanay Assel; Kazakhstan	Yenen Fatma Naz; Turkey
Kumite -68 kg	Meshkova Aleksandra [[|]]	Sieliemienieva Elina; Ukraine	Sombe Thalya; France
Kumite -68 kg	Meshkova Aleksandra [[|]]	Sieliemienieva Elina; Ukraine	Kama Tsubasa; Japan
Kumite 68+ kg	Berultseva Sofya; Kazakhstan	Gurung Arika; Nepal	Zibret Zala Maria; Slovenia
Kumite 68+ kg	Berultseva Sofya; Kazakhstan	Gurung Arika; Nepal	Bulay Dariia; Ukraine

== Karate One Premier League - Rabat 2026 ==
The Karate One Premier League - Rabat 2026 was held from 12 to 14 June 2026 in Rabat, Morocco.
