= Guillaume Cossou =

French karateka (born 1979)

Guillaume Cossou (born 29 June 1979) is a French karateka who won a bronze medal in the male open kumite at the 2004 European Karate Championships. Guillaume's brother Mathieu Cossou is also a karateka.
