= Mohamed Aly =

Mohamed Aly may refer to:

- Mohamed Aly (boxer) (born 1975), Egyptian boxer
- Mohamed Aly (gymnast), Egyptian gymnast
- Mohamed Aly (handballer), Egyptian handballer
- Mohamed Ahmed Aly (1920–2003), Egyptian sports shooter

== See also ==
- Muhammad Ali (1942–2016), American boxer
- Mohammad Ali (disambiguation)
