= Nikola Jovanović =

Nikola Jovanović may refer to:

== Film ==
- Nikola Jovanović (1939–2015), Serbian actor

== Politics ==
- Nikola Jovanović (politician), born in 1925 and a member of the Central Committee of the 13th Congress of the League of Communists of Yugoslavia

== Sports ==
=== Basketball ===
- Nikola Jovanović (basketball, born 1969), Borac Čačak, Crvena zvezda, FMP Železnik, Hemofarm
- Nikola Jovanović (basketball, born 1981), played professional basketball in Serbia, Cyprus, Greece, Poland, Romania, Hungary, and France
- Nikola Jovanović (basketball, born 1994), USC, Grand Rapids Drive, Crvena zvezda, Igokea

=== Football ===
- Nikola Jovanović (footballer, born 1952), Red Star Belgrade, Manchester United, Budućnost Podgorica
- Nikola Jovanović (footballer, born 1992), Serbian football defender

=== Other sports ===
- Nikola Jovanović (taekwondo) (born 1990), Serbian taekwondo athlete
