= Mathieu Cossou =

French karateka (born 1985)

Mathieu Cossou (born 1 June 1985 in Colombes, France) is a French karateka who won a silver medal in the men's kumite -65 kg weight class at the 2005 European Karate Championships. Mathieu's brother Guillaume Cossou is also a karateka.
