= 2022 in combat sports =

== Boxing ==
=== International boxing events ===
- May 8 – 20: 2022 IBA Women's World Boxing Championships in (Turkey) Istanbul

== Fencing ==
=== International fencing events ===
- July 15 – 23: 2022 World Fencing Championships in (Egypt) Cairo

=== 2021–22 Fencing World Cup ===
- November 19 – 21, 2021: WC #1 in (Estonia) Tallinn
  - Women's Épée winner: (France) Joséphine Jacques-André-Coquin
  - Women's Team Épée winners: Russia
- November 19 – 21, 2021: WC #2 in (Switzerland) Bern
  - Men's Épée winner: (Venezuela) Rubén Limardo
  - Men's Team Épée winners: Russia
- December 10 – 12, 2021: WC #3 in (France) Saint-Maur-des-Fossés
  - Women's Foil winner: (Italy) Alice Volpi
  - Women's Team Foil winners: Italy
- January 14 – 16: WC #4 in (France) Paris
  - Men's Foil winner: (Hong Kong) Cheung Ka Long
  - Men's Team Foil winners: Italy
- January 14 – 16: WC #5 in (Poland) Poznań
  - Women's Foil winner: (Italy) Alice Volpi
  - Women's Team Foil winners: United States
- January 15 – 17: WC #6 in (Georgia (country)) Tbilisi
  - Men's Sabre winner: (Georgia (country)) Sandro Bazadze
  - Women's Sabre winner: (France) Caroline Queroli
  - Men's Team Sabre winners: South Korea
  - Women's Team Sabre winners: South Korea
- January 28 – 30: WC #7 in (Bulgaria) Plovdiv
  - Women's Sabre winner: (Azerbaijan) Anna Bashta
  - Women's Team Sabre winners: France
- January 28 – 30: WC #8 in (Qatar) Doha
  - Men's Épée winner: (France) Yannick Borel
  - Women's Épée winner: (Estonia) Katrina Lehis
- February 11 – 13: WC #9 in Sochi
  - Men's Épée winner: (Italy) Valerio Cuomo
  - Men's Team Épée winners: Russia
- February 11 – 13: WC #10 in (Spain) Barcelona
  - Women's Épée winner: (South Korea) Song Se-ra
  - Women's Team Épée winners: France
- February 25 – 27: WC #11 in (Egypt) Cairo
  - Men's Foil winner: (Russia) Anton Borodachev
  - Men's Team Foil winners: United States
- February 25 – 27: WC #12 in (Mexico) Guadalajara
  - Women's Foil winner: (Italy) Alice Volpi
  - Women's Team Foil winners: United States
- March 4 – 6: WC #13 in (Greece) Athens
  - Women's Sabre winner: (Azerbaijan) Anna Bashta
  - Women's Team Sabre winners: Italy
- March 4 – 6: WC #14 in (Hungary) Budapest
  - Men's Épée winner: (Venezuela) Rubén Limardo
  - Women's Épée winner: (Italy) Alberta Santuccio
- March 18 – 20: WC #15 in Budapest
  - Men's Sabre winner: (Hungary) Áron Szilágyi
  - Men's Team Sabre winners: Hungary
- March 18 – 20: WC #16 in (Turkey) Istanbul
  - Women's Sabre winner: (France) Manon Apithy-Brunet
  - Women's Team Sabre winners: South Korea
- April 15 – 17: WC #17 in (France) Paris
  - Men's Épée winner: (France) Nelson Lopez-Pourtier
  - Men's Team Épée winners: Hungary
- April 15 – 18: WC #18 in (Serbia) Belgrade
  - Men's Foil winner: (Italy) Tommaso Marini
  - Women's Foil winner: (Germany) Anne Sauer
  - Men's Team Foil winners: Italy
  - Women's Team Foil winners: France
- April 29 – May 1: WC #19 in (Bulgaria) Plovdiv
  - Men's Foil winner: (Italy) Alessio Foconi
  - Men's Team Foil winners: Italy
- April 29 – May 1: WC #20 in (Germany) Tauberbischofsheim
  - Women's Foil winner: (United States) Lee Kiefer
  - Women's Team Foil winners: Italy
- April 29 – May 1: WC #21 in (Egypt) Cairo
  - Men's Épée winner: (France) Yannick Borel
  - Women's Épée winner: (South Korea) Choi In-jeong
- May 6 – 8: WC #22 in (Spain) Madrid
  - Men's Sabre winner: (South Korea) Oh Sang-uk
  - Men's Team Sabre winners: South Korea
- May 6 – 8: WC #23 in (Tunisia) Hammamet
  - Women's Sabre winner: (Japan) Misaki Emura
  - Women's Team Sabre winners: South Korea
- May 12 – 14: WC #24 in (Germany) Heidenheim an der Brenz
  - Men's Épée winner: (France) Romain Cannone
  - Men's Team Épée winners: South Korea
- May 13 – 15: WC #25 in (South Korea) Incheon
  - Men's Foil winner: (Italy) Tommaso Marini
  - Women's Foil winner: (United States) Lee Kiefer
- May 20 – 22: WC #26 in (Italy) Padua
  - Men's Sabre winner: (Hungary) Áron Szilágyi
  - Women's Sabre winner: (Azerbaijan) Anna Bashta
- May 27 – 29: WC #27 in (Poland) Katowice
  - Women's Épée winner: (South Korea) Choi In-jeong
  - Women's Team Épée winners: South Korea
- May 27 – 29: WC #28 in (Georgia (country)) Tbilisi
  - Men's Épée winner: (Ukraine) Volodymyr Stankevych
  - Men's Team Épée winners: Switzerland

== Judo ==
- August 7 – 14: 2022 World Judo Championships in (Uzbekistan) Tashkent

=== Judo World Tour ===
- January 28 – 30: (Portugal) 2022 Judo Grand Prix Almada
  - Extra-lightweight winners: (South Korea) Lee Ha-rim (m) / (Portugal) Catarina Costa (f)
  - Half-lightweight winners: (Moldova) Denis Vieru (m) / (Kosovo) Distria Krasniqi (f)
  - Lightweight winners: (Uzbekistan) Murodjon Yuldoshev (m) / (Brazil) Rafaela Silva (f)
  - Half-middleweight winners: (Belgium) Matthias Casse (m) / (Netherlands) Joanne van Lieshout (f)
  - Middleweight winners: (Netherlands) Jesper Smink (m) / (Croatia) Lara Cvjetko (f)
  - Half-heavyweight winners: (Portugal) Jorge Fonseca (m) / (South Korea) Yoon Hyun-ji (f)
  - Heavyweight winners: (South Korea) Kim Min-jong (m) / (South Korea) Kim Ha-yun (f)
- February 5 & 6: (France) 2022 Judo Grand Slam Paris
  - Extra-lightweight winners: (Japan) Ryuju Nagayama (m) / (Japan) Natsumi Tsunoda (f)
  - Half-lightweight winners: (Mongolia) Yondonperenlein Baskhüü (m) / (France) Amandine Buchard (f)
  - Lightweight winners: (Georgia (country)) Lasha Shavdatuashvili (m) / (Japan) Haruka Funakubo (f)
  - Half-middleweight winners: (Japan) Sotaro Fujiwara (m) / (Japan) Nami Nabekura (f)
  - Middleweight winners: (Japan) Sanshiro Murao (m) / (France) Margaux Pinot (f)
  - Half-heavyweight winners: (Belgium) Toma Nikiforov (m) / (France) Audrey Tcheuméo (f)
  - Heavyweight winners: (Mongolia) Odkhüügiin Tsetsentsengel (m) / (Japan) Wakaba Tomita (f)
- February 17 – 19: (Israel) 2022 Judo Grand Slam Tel Aviv
  - Extra-lightweight winners: (Ukraine) Artem Lesiuk (m) / (France) Shirine Boukli (f)
  - Half-lightweight winners: (Israel) Baruch Shmailov (m) / (France) Astride Gneto (f)
  - Lightweight winners: (Azerbaijan) Hidayat Heydarov (m) / (France) Priscilla Gneto (f)
  - Half-middleweight winners: (Belgium) Matthias Casse (m) / (Japan) Megumi Horikawa (f)
  - Middleweight winners: (Azerbaijan) Mammadali Mehdiyev (m) / (Japan) Shiho Tanaka (f)
  - Half-heavyweight winners: (Georgia (country)) Ilia Sulamanidze (m) / (Poland) Beata Pacut (f)
  - Heavyweight winners: (Georgia (country)) Guram Tushishvili (m) / (France) Romane Dicko (f)
- April 1 – 3: (Turkey) 2022 Judo Grand Slam Antalya
  - Extra-lightweight winners: (Chinese Taipei) Yang Yung-wei (m) / (Mongolia) Ganbaataryn Narantsetseg (f)
  - Half-lightweight winners: (Moldova) Denis Vieru (m) / (Hungary) Réka Pupp (f)
  - Lightweight winners: (Georgia (country)) Giorgi Terashvili (m) / (Canada) Jessica Klimkait (f)
  - Half-middleweight winners: (Brazil) Guilherme Schimidt (m) / (United Kingdom) Lucy Renshall (f)
  - Middleweight winners: (Cuba) Iván Felipe Silva Morales (m) / (France) Marie-Ève Gahié (f)
  - Half-heavyweight winners: (Portugal) Jorge Fonseca (m) / (Germany) Anna-Maria Wagner (f)
  - Heavyweight winners: (Georgia (country)) Guram Tushishvili (m) / (France) Léa Fontaine (f)
- June 3 – 5: (Georgia (country)) 2022 Judo Grand Slam Tbilisi

=== Judo Senior European Cup ===
- March 19 & 20: Senior European Cup #1 in (Latvia) Riga
- April 23 & 24: Senior European Cup #2 in (Croatia) Dubrovnik

=== Judo European Cup ===
- February 11 – 13: European Cup #1 in (Bosnia and Herzegovina) Sarajevo
  - Extra-lightweight winners: (Azerbaijan) Turan Bayramov (m) / (Turkey) Gülkader Şentürk (f)
  - Half-lightweight winners: (Turkey) Ejder Toktay (m) / (Switzerland) Binta Ndiaye (f)
  - Lightweight winners: (Germany) Michel Adam (m) / (Spain) Carla Ubasart Mascaró (f)
  - Half-middleweight winners: (France) Arnaud Aregba (m) / (Spain) Sarai Padilla (f)
  - Middleweight winners: (Germany) Martin Matijass (m) / (Croatia) Lara Cvjetko (f)
  - Half-heavyweight winners: (Italy) Enrico Bergamelli (m) / (Kosovo) Loriana Kuka (f)
  - Heavyweight winners: (Slovenia) Vito Dragič (m) / (France) Valentine Marchand (f)
- February 26 & 27: European Cup #2 in (Poland) Warsaw

=== Judo European Open ===
- March 5 & 6: European Open #1 in (Czech Republic) Prague

=== Judo African Open ===
- March 12 & 13: African Open #1 in (Tunisia) Tunis
- March 19 & 20: African Open #2 in (Algeria) Algiers

== Karate ==
- May 25 – 29: 2022 European Karate Championships in (Turkey) Gaziantep
- May 26 – 28: 2022 Pan American Karate Championships in Curaçao
- June 4 – 5: 2022 Oceania Karate Championships in New Caledonia

=== 2022 Karate1 Premier League ===
- February 18 – 20: #1 in (United Arab Emirates) Fujairah
  - Kata winners: (Turkey) Enes Özdemir (m) / (Japan) Kiyou Shimizu (f)
  - Men's −60 kg winner: (Jordan) Abdullah Hammad
  - Men's −67 kg winner: (Kazakhstan) Didar Amirali
  - Men's −75 kg winner: (Egypt) Abdalla Abdelaziz
  - Men's −84 kg winner: (Egypt) Youssef Badawy
  - Men's +84 kg winner: (Egypt) Hazeem Mohamed
  - Women's −50 kg winner: (Kazakhstan) Moldir Zhangbyrbay
  - Women's −55 kg winner: (Russia) Anna Chernysheva
  - Women's −61 kg winner: (Italy) Alessandra Mangiacapra
  - Women's −68 kg winner: (Azerbaijan) Irina Zaretska
  - Women's +68 kg winner: (France) Nancy Garcia
- April 22 – 24: #2 in (Portugal) Matosinhos
  - Kata winners: (Japan) Kakeru Nishiyama (m) / (Japan) Kiyou Shimizu (f)
  - Men's −60 kg winner: (Greece) Christos-Stefanos Xenos
  - Men's −67 kg winner: (France) Steven Da Costa
  - Men's −75 kg winner: (Italy) Daniele De Vivo
  - Men's −84 kg winner: (Netherlands) Brian Timmermans
  - Men's +84 kg winner: (Spain) Babacar Seck
  - Women's −50 kg winner: (Venezuela) Yorgelis Salazar
  - Women's −55 kg winner: (Ukraine) Anzhelika Terliuga
  - Women's −61 kg winner: (Ukraine) Anita Serogina
  - Women's −68 kg winner: (Italy) Silvia Semeraro
  - Women's +68 kg winner: (Croatia) Lucija Lesjak
- May 13 – 15: #3 in (Morocco) Rabat
  - Kata winners: (Japan) Kazumasa Moto (m) / (Japan) Hikaru Ono (f)
  - Men's −60 kg winner: (Morocco) Abdel Ali Jina
  - Men's −67 kg winner: (Greece) Dionysios Xenos
  - Men's −75 kg winner: (Egypt) Abdalla Abdelaziz
  - Men's −84 kg winner: (Egypt) Youssef Badawy
  - Men's +84 kg winner: (Egypt) Taha Tarek Mahmoud
  - Women's −50 kg winner: (Egypt) Reem Ahmed Salama
  - Women's −55 kg winner: (Ukraine) Anzhelika Terliuga
  - Women's −61 kg winner: (Egypt) Dahab Ali
  - Women's −68 kg winner: (Switzerland) Elena Quirici
  - Women's +68 kg winner: (Japan) Ayumi Uekusa
- September 2 – 4: #4 in (Azerbaijan) Baku

=== 2022 Karate1 Series A ===
- January 28 – 30: #1 in Pamplona
  - Kata winners: (Japan) Ryuji Moto (m) / (Spain) Gema Morales (f)
  - Kata Team winners: Kuwait (Mohammad Hussain, Sayed Salman Al-Mosawi, Mohammad Al-Mosawi) (m) / Spain (Raquel Roy Rubio, María López Pintado, Lidia Rodríguez Encabo) (f)
  - Men's −60 kg winner: (Italy) Danilo Greco
  - Men's −67 kg winner: (Russia) Ernest Sharafutdinov
  - Men's −75 kg winner: (France) Kilian Cizo
  - Men's −84 kg winner: (France) Dany Makamata
  - Men's +84 kg winner: (Czech Republic) Ondřej Bosák
  - Women's −50 kg winner: (Brazil) Valéria Kumizaki
  - Women's −55 kg winner: (Germany) Mia Bitsch
  - Women's −61 kg winner: (Switzerland) Elena Quirici
  - Women's −68 kg winner: (Netherlands) Lynn Snel
  - Women's +68 kg winner: (Russia) Tatiana Zyabkina
- June 10 – 12: #2 in (Egypt) Cairo
- September 23 – 25: #3 in (Chile) Temuco
- November 11 – 13: #4 in (China) TBD

== Mixed Martial Arts ==
=== UFC ===
The UFC promotional company has held a total of 33 events so far in 2022.

=== Bellator ===
In 2022 Bellator has held a total of 14 events so far.

=== ONE Championship ===
The ONE Championship has held a total of 32 events across the world in 2022.

== Sambo ==
- April 21 – 23: 2022 European Youth and Junior Sambo Championships in (Estonia) Tallinn
- May 27 – 29: 2022 European Sambo Championships in (Russia) Yekaterinburg
- June 2 – 4: 2022 Asian Sambo Championships in (Lebanon) Jounieh
- June 2 – 4: 2022 Asian Youth and Junior Sambo Championships in (Lebanon) Jounieh
- July 15 – 17: 2022 African Sambo Championships in (Cameroon) Yaounde
- July 29 – 31: 2022 Pan American Sambo Championships in (Costa Rica) Puntarenas
- August 27 & 28: 2022 World Beach Sambo Championships in (Israel) Bat Yam
- September 17 & 18: 2022 World Masters Sambo Championships in (Armenia) Yerevan
- October 14 – 16: 2022 World Youth and Junior Sambo Championships in (Bulgaria) Panagyurishte
- November 11 – 13: 2022 World Sambo Championships in (Turkmenistan) Ashgabat
- November 26 – 27: 2022 World Schools Sambo Championships in (Armenia) Tsaghkadzor
- December 3 & 4: 2022 World Cadet Sambo Championships in (Moldova) Chișinău

=== 2022 World Sambo Cup ===
- March 24 & 25: World Super Cup "Memorial to the SAMBO Founders" in (Russia) Moscow
- May 14 & 15: WC #1 in (Dominican Republic) Santo Domingo
- June 18 & 19: WC #2 in (Morocco) Casablanca
- August 20 & 21: WC #3 in (Kyrgyzstan) Bishkek
- September 17 & 18: WC #4 in (Serbia) Novi Sad

=== 2022 European Sambo Cup ===
- February 11 – 13: EC #1 in (Belarus) Minsk
  - Women's 50 kg winner: (Russia) Kristina Karekyan
  - Women's 54 kg winner: (Belarus) Alena Kupava
  - Men's 58 kg winner: (Armenia) Tigran Kirakosyan
  - Women's 59 kg winner: (Russia) Evgenia Pavlova
  - Men's 64 kg winner: (Russia) Alexander Pshenychnykh
  - Women's 65 kg winner: (Russia) Karina Cherevan
  - Men's 71 kg winner: (Georgia (country)) Mindia Liluashvili
  - Women's 72 kg winner: (Russia) Anastasia Filippovich
  - Men's 79 kg winner: (Georgia (country)) Besarioni Berulava
  - Women's 80 kg winner: (Georgia (country)) Nino Odzelashvili
  - Women's 80+ kg winner: (Belarus) Maria Kondratieva
  - Men's 88 kg winner: (Belarus) Vladimir Zhupikov
  - Men's 98 kg winner: (Russia) Sergey Kuznetsov
  - Men's 98+ kg winner: (Russia) Anton Brachev
- September 10 & 11: EC #2 in (Georgia (country)) Tbilisi
- October 9 & 10: EC #3 in (Russia) Kazan
- December 9 – 11: EC #4 in (Romania) Bucharest

=== 2022 Asian Sambo Cup ===
- TBD in July: AC #1 in (Indonesia) Bali

== Taekwondo ==
- April 21 – 24: 2022 World Taekwondo Poomsae Championships in (South Korea) Goyang
- May 19 – 22: 2022 European Taekwondo Championships and 2022 Para-European Taekwondo Championships in (United Kingdom) Manchester

== Wrestling ==
=== 2022 Wrestling Continental Championships ===
- March 7–13: 2022 European U23 Wrestling Championship in (Bulgaria) Plovdiv
  - Freestyle wrestling winners: Azerbaijan
  - Greco-Roman wrestling winners: Georgia
  - Women wrestling winners: Turkey
- March 26 – April 3: 2022 European Wrestling Championships in (Hungary) Budapest
  - Freestyle wrestling winners: Azerbaijan
  - Greco-Roman wrestling winners: Azerbaijan
  - Women wrestling winners: Turkey
- April 19–24: 2022 Asian Wrestling Championships in (Mongolia) Ulaanbaatar
  - Freestyle wrestling winners: Iran
  - Greco-Roman wrestling winners: Kazakhstan
  - Women wrestling winners: Japan
- May 10–13: Wrestling at the 2021 Summer Deaflympics in (Brazil) Caxias do Sul
  - Freestyle wrestling winners: Turkey
  - Greco-Roman wrestling winners: Iran
- May 5–8: 2022 Pan American Wrestling Championships in (Mexico) Acapulco
  - Freestyle wrestling winners: United States
  - Greco-Roman wrestling winners: United States
  - Women wrestling winners: United States
- May 17–19: Wrestling at the 2022 Southeast Asian Games in Hanoi
  - Freestyle wrestling winners: Vietnam
  - Greco-Roman wrestling winners: Vietnam
  - Women wrestling winners: Vietnam
- May 17–22: 2022 African Wrestling Championships in (Morocco) El Jadida
  - Freestyle wrestling winners: Egypt
  - Greco-Roman wrestling winners: Egypt
  - Women wrestling winners: Tunisia
- June 13–19: 2022 European Cadets Wrestling Championships in (Romania) Bucharest
  - Freestyle wrestling winners: Azerbaijan
  - Greco-Roman wrestling winners: Azerbaijan
  - Women wrestling winners: Ukraine
- June 19–26: 2022 Asian U23 and Cadets Wrestling Championship in Bishkek
  - Cadets (U-17)
    - Freestyle wrestling winners: India
    - Greco-Roman wrestling winners: Kyrgyzstan
    - Women wrestling winners: India
  - U-23
    - Freestyle wrestling winners: Kazakhstan
    - Greco-Roman wrestling winners: Kyrgyzstan
    - Women wrestling winners: India
- June 24–26: 2022 Pan American Cadets Wrestling Championships in (Argentina) Buenos Aires
  - Freestyle wrestling winners: United States
  - Greco-Roman wrestling winners: United States
  - Women wrestling winners: United States
- June 27–30: Wrestling at the 2022 Mediterranean Games in (Algeria) Oran
  - Freestyle wrestling winners: Turkey
  - Greco-Roman wrestling winners: Turkey
  - Women wrestling winners: Turkey
- June 27 – July 3: 2022 European Juniors Wrestling Championships in (Italy) Rome
  - Freestyle wrestling winners: Georgia
  - Greco-Roman wrestling winners: Georgia
  - Women wrestling winners: Ukraine
- July 2–10: 2022 Asian Juniors Wrestling Championships in (Bahrain) Manama
  - Schools (U-15)
    - Freestyle wrestling winners: India
    - Greco-Roman wrestling winners: Iran
    - Women wrestling winners: India
  - Juniors U-20
    - Freestyle wrestling winners: Iran
    - Greco-Roman wrestling winners: Iran
    - Women wrestling winners: Japan
- July 3–5: Wrestling at the 2022 Bolivarian Games in (Colombia) Valledupar
    - Freestyle wrestling winners: Venezuela
    - Greco-Roman wrestling winners: Venezuela
    - Women wrestling winners: Ecuador
- July 8–10: 2022 Pan American Juniors Wrestling Championships in (Mexico) Oaxtepec
    - Freestyle wrestling winners: United States
    - Greco-Roman wrestling winners: United States
    - Women wrestling winners: United States
- July 16–19: 2022 European Schools Wrestling Championship in (Croatia) Zagreb
    - Freestyle wrestling winners: Georgia
    - Greco-Roman wrestling winners: Azerbaijan
    - Women wrestling winners: Ukraine
- July 25–31: 2022 World Cadets Wrestling Championships in (Italy) Rome
  - Freestyle wrestling winners: United States
  - Greco-Roman wrestling winners: Iran
  - Women wrestling winners: Japan
- August 5–6: Wrestling at the 2022 Commonwealth Games in (England) Birmingham
- August 10–13: Wrestling at the 2021 Islamic Solidarity Games in (Turkey) Konya
- August 15–21: 2022 World Junior Wrestling Championships in (Bulgaria) Sofia
  - Freestyle wrestling winners: Iran
  - Greco-Roman wrestling winners: Iran
  - Women wrestling winners: Japan
- September 10–18: 2022 World Wrestling Championships in (Serbia) Belgrade
  - Freestyle wrestling winners: United States
  - Greco-Roman wrestling winners: Turkey
  - Women wrestling winners: Japan
- September 26-30: Wrestling at the FISU World Cup Combat Sports in Samsun
  - Freestyle wrestling winners: Turkey
  - Greco-Roman wrestling winners: Turkey
  - Women wrestling winners: Turkey
- October 4–9: 2022 Veterans World Wrestling Championships in (Bulgaria) Sofia
- October 12–14: Wrestling at the 2022 South American Games in (Paraguay) Asunción
- October 17–23: 2022 U23 World Wrestling Championships in (Spain) Pontevedra
  - Freestyle wrestling winners: Georgia
  - Greco-Roman wrestling winners: Iran
  - Women wrestling winners: Japan
- November 5–6: 2022 Wrestling World Cup - Men's Greco-Roman in (Azerbaijan) Baku
  - Greco-Roman wrestling winners: Iran
- December 10–11: 2022 Wrestling World Cup - Men's freestyle in Iowa City
  - Freestyle wrestling winners: United States
- December 10–11: 2022 Wrestling World Cup - Women's freestyle in (United States) Iowa City
  - Women wrestling winners: Ukraine

=== 2022 Wrestling Ranking Series ===
Ranking Series Calendar 2022:

- 24–27 February: 1st Ranking Series: 2022 Yasar Dogu Tournament and 2022 Vehbi Emre & Hamit Kaplan Tournament in Istanbul
  - Freestyle wrestling winners: Turkey
  - Greco–Roman wrestling winners: Turkey
  - Women wrestling winners: Russian Wrestling Federation
- 2–5 June: 2nd Ranking Series: 2022 Bolat Turlykhanov Cup in Almaty
  - Freestyle wrestling winners: Kazakhstan
  - Greco–Roman wrestling winners: Iran
  - Women wrestling winners: India
- 22–25 June: 3rd Ranking Series: Matteo Pellicone Ranking Series 2022 in (Italy) Rome
  - Freestyle wrestling winners: Azerbaijan
  - Greco–Roman wrestling winners: Azerbaijan
  - Women wrestling winners: Ukraine
- 14–17 July: 4th Ranking Series: 2022 Tunis Ranking Series in Tunisia Tunis
  - Freestyle wrestling winners: India
  - Greco–Roman wrestling winners: Turkey
  - Women wrestling winners: India

=== 2022 Wrestling International tournament ===
- January 20–23: Grand Prix de France Henri Deglane 2022 in Nice
  - Competition cancelled.
- January 26–30: Golden Grand Prix Ivan Yarygin 2022 in Krasnoyarsk
  - Final medals rankings: 1st place: Russia, 2nd place: Dagestan, 3rd place: United States
- January 29–30: 2022 Grand Prix Zagreb Open in (Croatia) Zagreb
  - Greco–Roman wrestling winners: Turkey
- February 17–20: 2022 Dan Kolov & Nikola Petrov Tournament in Veliko Tarnovo
  - Freestyle wrestling winners: Belarus
  - Greco–Roman wrestling winners: Georgia
  - Women wrestling winners: Bulgaria
- May 12–15: 2022 Muhamet Malo in Tirana
  - Freestyle wrestling winners: Albania
  - Greco–Roman wrestling winners: Italy
- May 27–29: 2022 Pat Shaw Memorial in Guatemala City
  - Freestyle wrestling winners: Guatemala
  - Greco–Roman wrestling winners: Guatemala
  - Women wrestling winners: Guatemala
- June 10–12: 2022 Macedonian Pearl in Radovish
  - Freestyle wrestling winners: North Macedonia
- July 8–10: 2022 Grand Prix of Spain in Madrid
  - Freestyle wrestling winners: Germany
  - Greco–Roman wrestling winners: Georgia
  - Women wrestling winners: Canada
- July 21–24: 2022 Ziolkowski, Pytlasinski, Poland Open in Warsaw
  - Freestyle wrestling winners: Ukraine
  - Greco–Roman wrestling winners: Hungary
  - Women wrestling winners: China
- July 29–31: 2022 Ion Cornianu & Ladislau Simon in (Romania) Bucharest
  - Freestyle wrestling winners: Kazakhstan
  - Greco–Roman wrestling winners: Kazakhstan
  - Women wrestling winners: China
- August 6–7: 2022 Grand Prix of Germany in Dortmund
  - Greco–Roman wrestling winners: Ukraine
- August 12–13: 2022 Ljubomir Ivanovic Gedza Memorial in (Serbia) Mladenovac
  - Greco–Roman wrestling winners: Hungary
- August 19–21: 2022 Druskininkai Cup in (Lithuania) Druskininkai
  - Greco–Roman wrestling winners: Georgia
- August 25-26: Slavin, Halfen, Weinberg & Gottfreund Memorial in Beer Sheva
  - Freestyle wrestling winners: Israel
  - Greco–Roman wrestling winners: Israel
- September 30–1: 2022 Thor Masters in (Denmark) Nykobing Falster
- November 2–6: 2022 Kunayev D.A. in Taraz City
  - Freestyle wrestling winners: Kazakhstan
- November 5–6: 2022 Kristjan Palusalu Memorial in (Estonia) Tallinn
- December 3–4: 2022 Haparanda Cup in (Sweden) Haparanda
- December 10–11: 2022 Arvo Haavisto in (Finland) Ilmajoki
