= Alessandra Mangiacapra =

Italian karateka (born 1999)

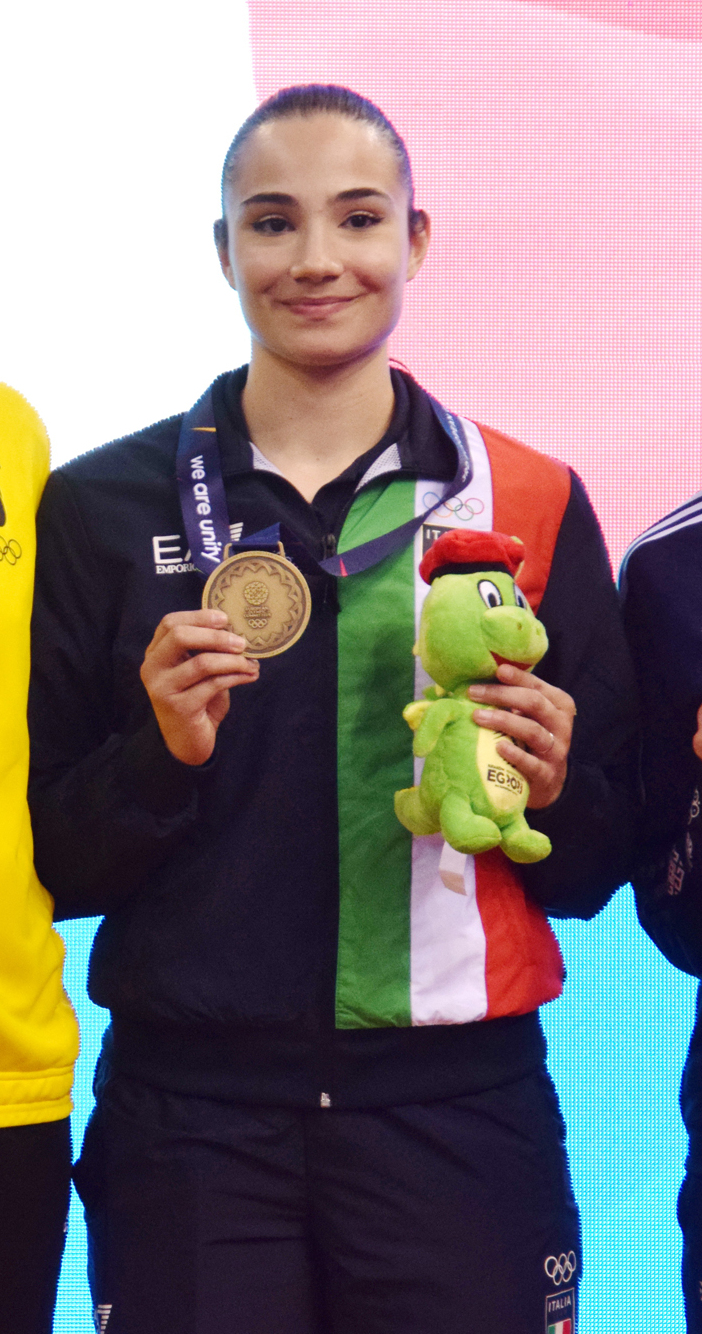
- Mangiacapra at the 2023 European Games

Personal information
- Born: 10 July 1999 (age 27)

Sport
- Country: Italy
- Sport: Karate
- Weight class: 61 kg
- Events: Kumite; Team kumite
Medal record
Women's karate
Representing Italy
World Championships
Bronze medal – third place	2021 Dubai	Team kumite
European Games
Bronze medal – third place	2023 Kraków-Małopolska	Kumite 61 kg
European Championships
Bronze medal – third place	2021 Poreč	Team kumite
Bronze medal – third place	2023 Guadalajara	Team kumite
Mediterranean Games
Bronze medal – third place	2022 Oran	Kumite 61 kg
Bronze medal – third place	2026 Taranto	Kumite 61 kg

Alessandra Mangiacapra (born 10 July 1999) is an Italian karateka. She won one of the bronze medals in the women's kumite 61 kg event at the 2023 European Games held in Poland. She also won one of the bronze medals in her event at the 2022 Mediterranean Games held in Oran, Algeria.

== Career ==
Mangiacapra won the silver medal in her event at the 2019 World Cadet, Junior and U21 Karate Championships held in Santiago, Chile. She lost against Gwendoline Philippe of France in the final.

In 2021, Italy won one of the bronze medals in the women's team kumite event at the European Karate Championships held in Poreč, Croatia. A few months later, Italy won one of the bronze medals in the women's team kumite event at the World Karate Championships held in Dubai, United Arab Emirates. Mangiacapra also competed in the women's 61 kg event where she was eliminated in the quarterfinals by Ingrida Suchánková of Slovakia.

Mangiacapra competed in the women's 61 kg event at the 2022 European Karate Championships held in Gaziantep, Turkey where she was eliminated in her first match. A month later, she won one of the bronze medals in her event at the 2022 Mediterranean Games held in Oran, Algeria.

In 2023, Italy won one of the bronze medals in the women's team kumite event at the European Karate Championships held in Guadalajara, Spain. She also competed in the women's kumite 61 kg event. A few months later, Mangiacapra won one of the bronze medals in the women's kumite 61 kg event at the 2023 European Games held in Poland. She finished in second place in her pool and she then lost in the semifinals against eventual gold medalist Reem Khamis of Germany. In the same year, she competed in the women's 61 kg event at the World Karate Championships held in Budapest, Hungary.

== Achievements ==
Year	Competition	Location	Rank	Event
2021	European Championships	Poreč, Croatia	3rd	Team kumite
2021	World Championships	Dubai, United Arab Emirates	3rd	Team kumite
2022	Mediterranean Games	Oran, Algeria	3rd	Kumite 61 kg
2023	European Championships	Guadalajara, Spain	3rd	Team kumite
2023	European Games	Kraków and Małopolska, Poland	3rd	Kumite 61 kg
2026	Mediterranean Games	Taranto, Italy	3rd	Kumite 61 kg
