= 2024 European Karate Championships – Women's team kumite =

European Karate Championship

Women's team kumite at the 2024 European Karate Championships
- Venue: Krešimir Ćosić Hall
- Location: Zadar, Croatia
- Dates: 10–11 May
- Nations: 33
- Teams: 33

Medalists
gold medal	Mia Bitsch; Shara Hubrich; Reem Khamis; Johanna Kneer; Madeleine Schröter	Germany
silver medal	Giulia Angelucci; Anna Pia Desiderio; Pamela Bodei; Clio Ferracuti; Viola Lallo	Italy
bronze medal	Sudenur Aksoy; Eda Eltemur; Gülbahar Gözütok; Tuba Yakan; Fatma Naz Yenen	Turkey
bronze medal	Alizée Agier; Léa Avazeri; Thalya Sombe; Jennifer Zameto	France

The Women's team kumite competition at the 2024 European Karate Championships was held from 10 to 11 May 2024.

== Results ==
=== Final ===
Final
Italy	0
Germany	2

=== Top half ===
Round of 64
	Score	
Latvia	0–2	Turkey

Round of 32
Turkey	2
Kosovo	1
Sweden	1
Azerbaijan	2
Spain	2
Switzerland	1
Montenegro	0
Italy	2
Romania	0
Netherlands	2
Hungary	2
Denmark	0
Austria	0
Poland	2
Slovakia	0
Croatia	2

Round of 16
Turkey	2
Azerbaijan	0
Spain	0
Italy	2
Netherlands	2
Hungary	1
Poland	1
Croatia	2

Quarterfinals
Turkey	0
Italy	2
Netherlands	0
Croatia	2

Semifinals
Italy	2
Croatia	0

=== Bottom half ===
Round of 32
Bosnia and Herzegovina	0
Belgium	2
Scotland	2
Ireland	1
Ukraine	0
North Macedonia	2
Cyprus
France
Portugal	0
England	2
Bulgaria	0
Slovenia	0
Finland	0
Serbia	2
Greece	0
Germany	2

Round of 16
Belgium	2
Scotland	0
North Macedonia	2
France	3
England	2
Slovenia	0
Serbia	0
Germany	2

Quarterfinals
Belgium	0
France	2
England	0
Germany	2

Semifinals
France	1
Germany	2

=== Repechage ===
Repechage round 1
Montenegro	0
Spain	2
Serbia	1
Greece	2

Repechage round 2
Spain	0
Turkey	2
England	0
Serbia	2

Bronze medals
Croatia	0
Turkey	2
France	2
Serbia	0
