= Karate at the 2023 European Games – Women's kumite 61 kg =

Women's kumite 61 kg at the 2023 European Games
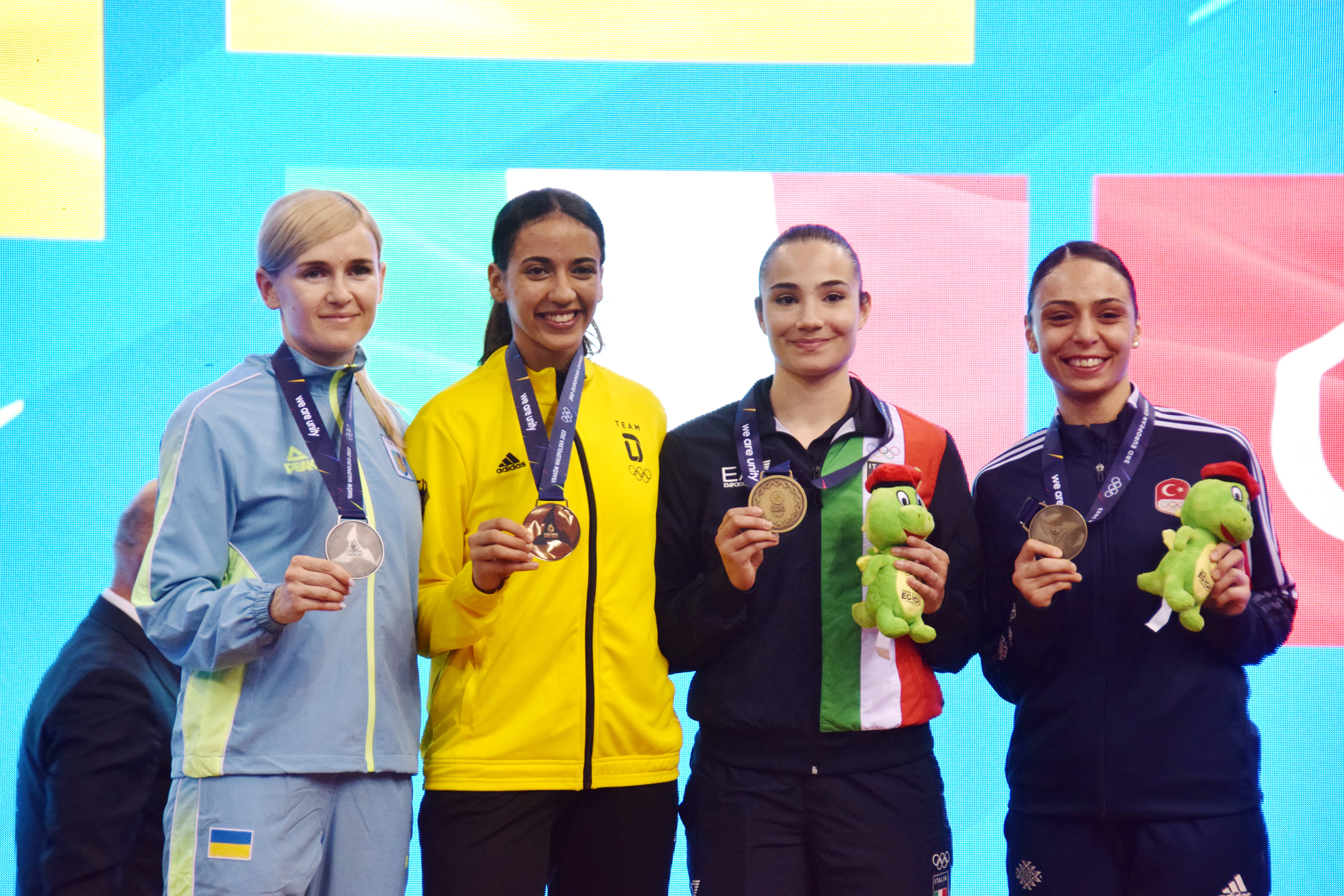
- Venue: Bielsko-Biała Arena
- Date: 23 June
- Competitors: 8 from 8 nations

Medalists
gold medal	Reem Khamis	Germany
silver medal	Anita Serogina	Ukraine
bronze medal	Alessandra Mangiacapra	Italy
bronze medal	Gülbahar Gözütok	Turkey

The women's kumite 61 kg competition at the 2023 European Games was held on 23 June 2023 at the Bielsko-Biała Arena.

== Results ==
=== Elimination round ===
Pool A

Pos	Athlete	B	W	D	D^{0}	L	Pts	Score	(Germany)	(Turkey)	(Netherlands)	(Poland)
1	Reem Khamis (GER)	3	3	0	0	0	9	12–4	—	3–0	4–0	5–4
2	Gülbahar Gözütok (TUR)	3	2	0	0	1	6	12–6	0–3	—	1–0	11–3
3	Lynn Snel (NED)	3	1	0	0	2	3	6–6	0–4	0–1	—	6–1
4	Weronika Mikulska (POL)	3	0	0	0	3	0	8–22	4–5	3–11	1–6	—

Source: EG2023

Pool B

Pos	Athlete	B	W	D	D^{0}	L	Pts	Score	(Ukraine)	(Italy)	(Slovakia)	(Sweden)
1	Anita Serogina (UKR)	3	3	0	0	0	9	12–4	—	5–1	3–2	4–1
2	Alessandra Mangiacapra (ITA)	3	2	0	0	1	6	5–7	1–5	—	2–1	2–1
3	Ingrida Bakoš Suchánková (SVK)	3	1	0	0	2	3	7–5	2–3	1–2	—	4–0
4	Anna-Johanna Nilsson (SWE)	3	0	0	0	3	0	2–10	1–4	1–2	0–4	—

Source: EG2023

=== Finals ===
Semifinals
Alessandra Mangiacapra (ITA)	1
Reem Khamis (GER)	7
Gülbahar Gözütok (TUR)	0
Anita Serogina (UKR)	2

Gold medal bout
Reem Khamis (GER)	2
Anita Serogina (UKR)	2
