= Gülbahar Gözütok =

Turkish karateka (born 2002)

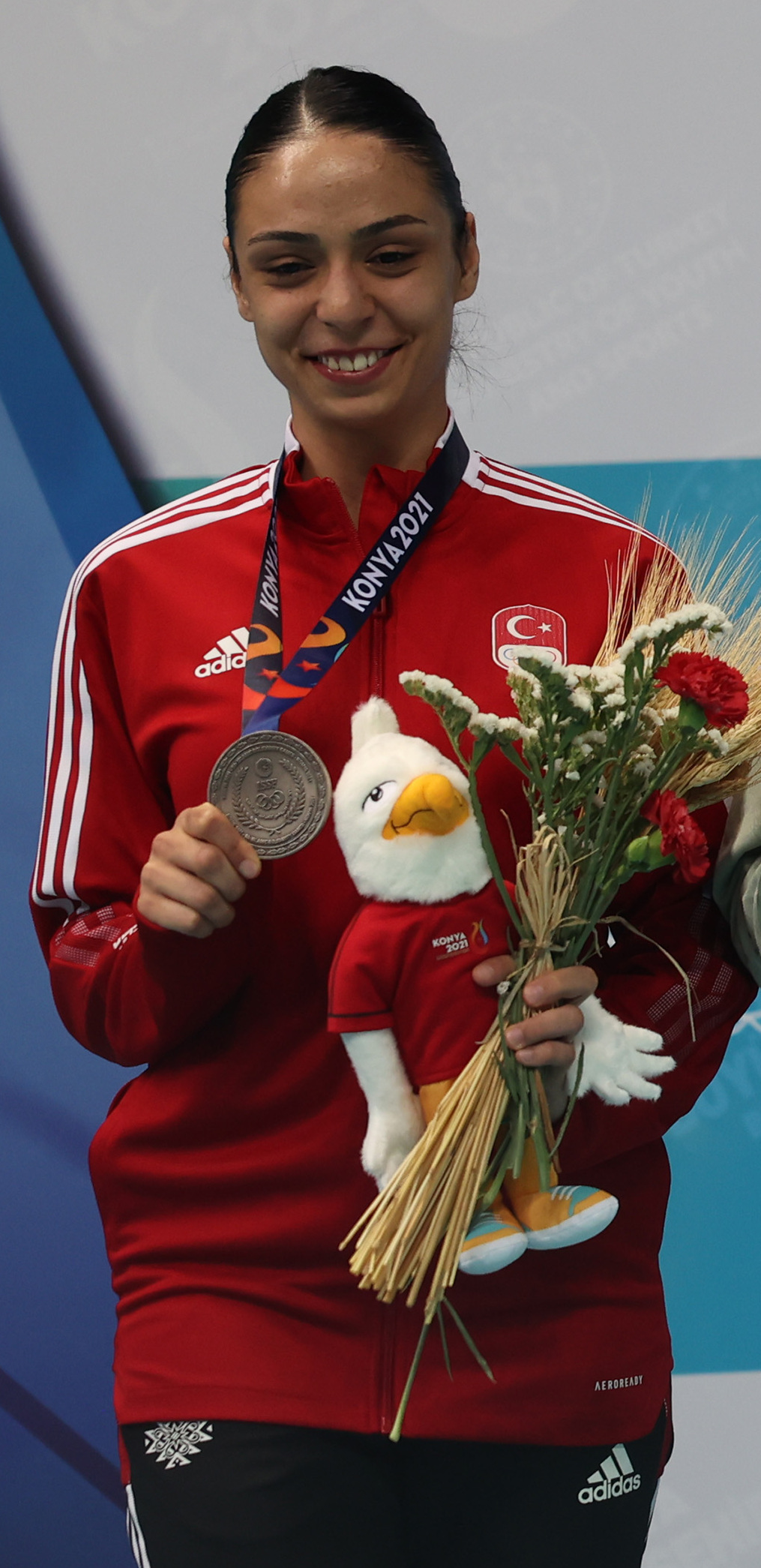

Personal information
- Born: 2 January 2002 (age 24) Kayseri, Turkey
- Years active: 2013–
- Height: 170 cm (5 ft 7 in)
- Weight: 61 kg (134 lb; 9.6 st)

Sport
- Country: Turkey
- Sport: Karate
Medal record
Women's karate
Representing Turkey
European Championships
Bronze medal – third place	2024 Zadar	Team kumite
European Games
Bronze medal – third place	2023 Kraków	Kumite 61 kg
Islamic Solidarity Games
Silver medal – second place	2021 Konya	Kumite 61 kg
World U21 Championships
Gold medal – first place	2022 Konya	Kumite 61 kg

Gülbahar Gözütok (born 2 January 2002) is a Turkish karateka.

== Career ==
=== Early years ===
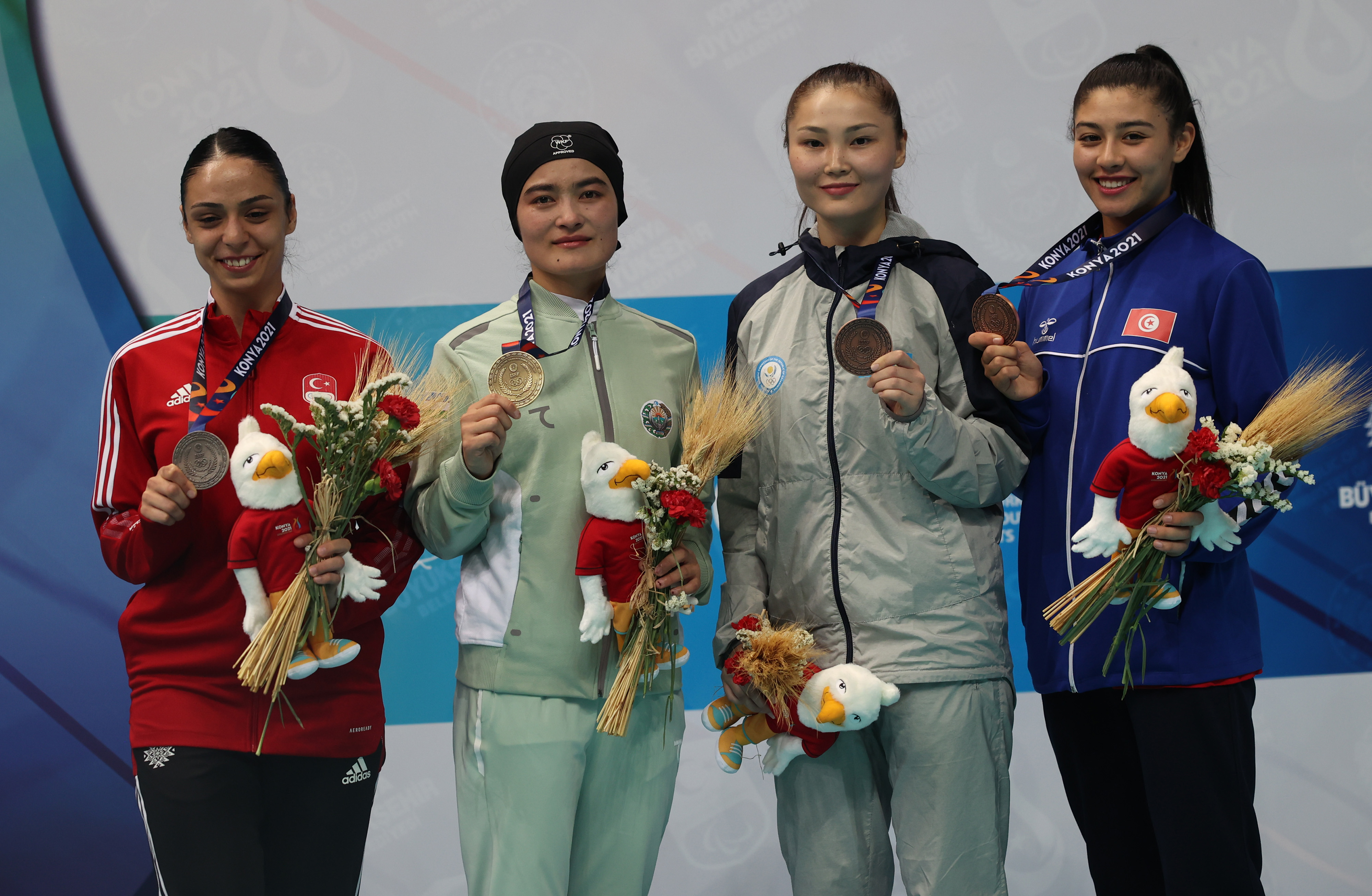
Gözütok (left) at the 61 kg medal ceremony of the 2021 Islamic Solidarity Games.

Gözütok took the gold medal, her first official medal, in the +40 kg event of the 2002-births category at the 2013 Turkish Children's Championship in İzmir. At the "5th World Children's Karate Championship" (Turkish: Dünya Çocukları Karate Şampionası) in 2014, which is held annually on the occasion of the National Sovereignty and Children's Day in Turkey, Gözütok became champion. In 2015 at the age of 13, she won three gold and a silver medal at the 7th European Shotokan Karate Championship and at the World Cup. In November 2019, she took the silver medal at the Turkish U21 Championship. She won the gold medal by defeating German Reem Khamis in the women's 61 kg final match in the U21 category at the 2022 World U21 Championships held at the Karatay Congress and Sport Center in Konya, Turkey.

=== Senior career ===
In February 2022, she debuted as senior at the Turkish Championships, and became champion. The same year in August, she became silver medalist at the Islamic Solidarity Games in Konya, Turkey. She won a bronze medal in the women's 61 kg event at the 2023 European Games held at the Bielsko-Biała Arena in Bielsko-Biała, Poland.

Gözütok is a member of Balkaya Sport Club in Kayseri, where she is coached by Metin Balkaya.

== Personal life ==
Gülbaher Gözütok was born on 2 January 2002. She lives in Kayseri, Turkey.
