= Gwendoline Philippe =

French karateka (born 1999)

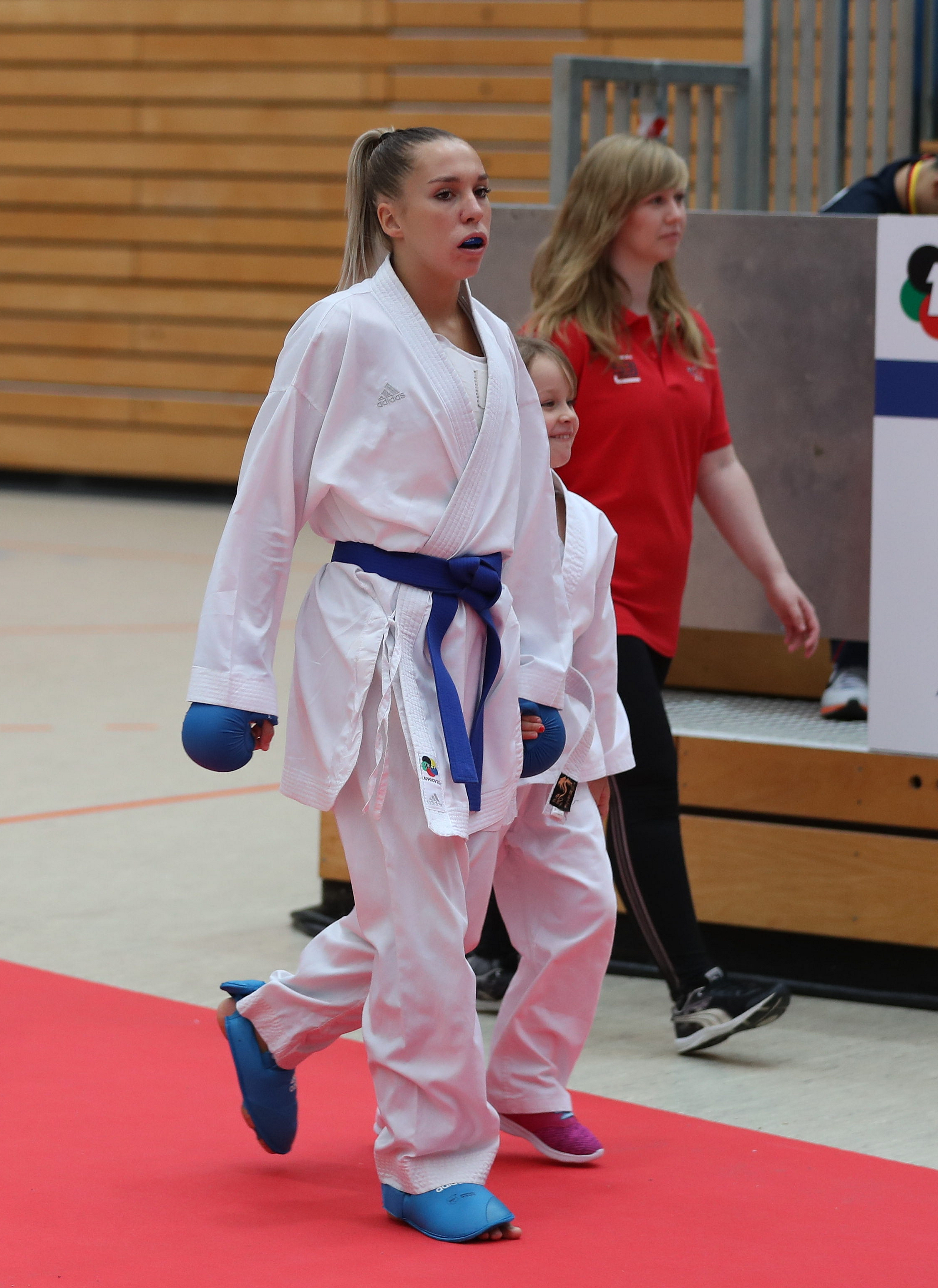
- Gwendoline Philippe in 2018

Personal information
- Born: 28 June 1999 (age 27) Bagnols-sur-Cèze, France
- Height: 168 cm (5 ft 6 in)

Sport
- Country: France
- Sport: Karate
- Weight class: 61 kg
- Events: Kumite; Team kumite
Medal record
Women's karate
Representing France
European Games
Bronze medal – third place	2019 Minsk	Kumite 61 kg
European Championships
Bronze medal – third place	2018 Novi Sad	Team kumite

Gwendoline Philippe (born 28 June 1999) is a French karateka. She won one of the bronze medals in the women's kumite 61 kg event at the 2019 European Games held in Minsk, Belarus. In the semi-finals she lost against Tjaša Ristić of Slovenia.

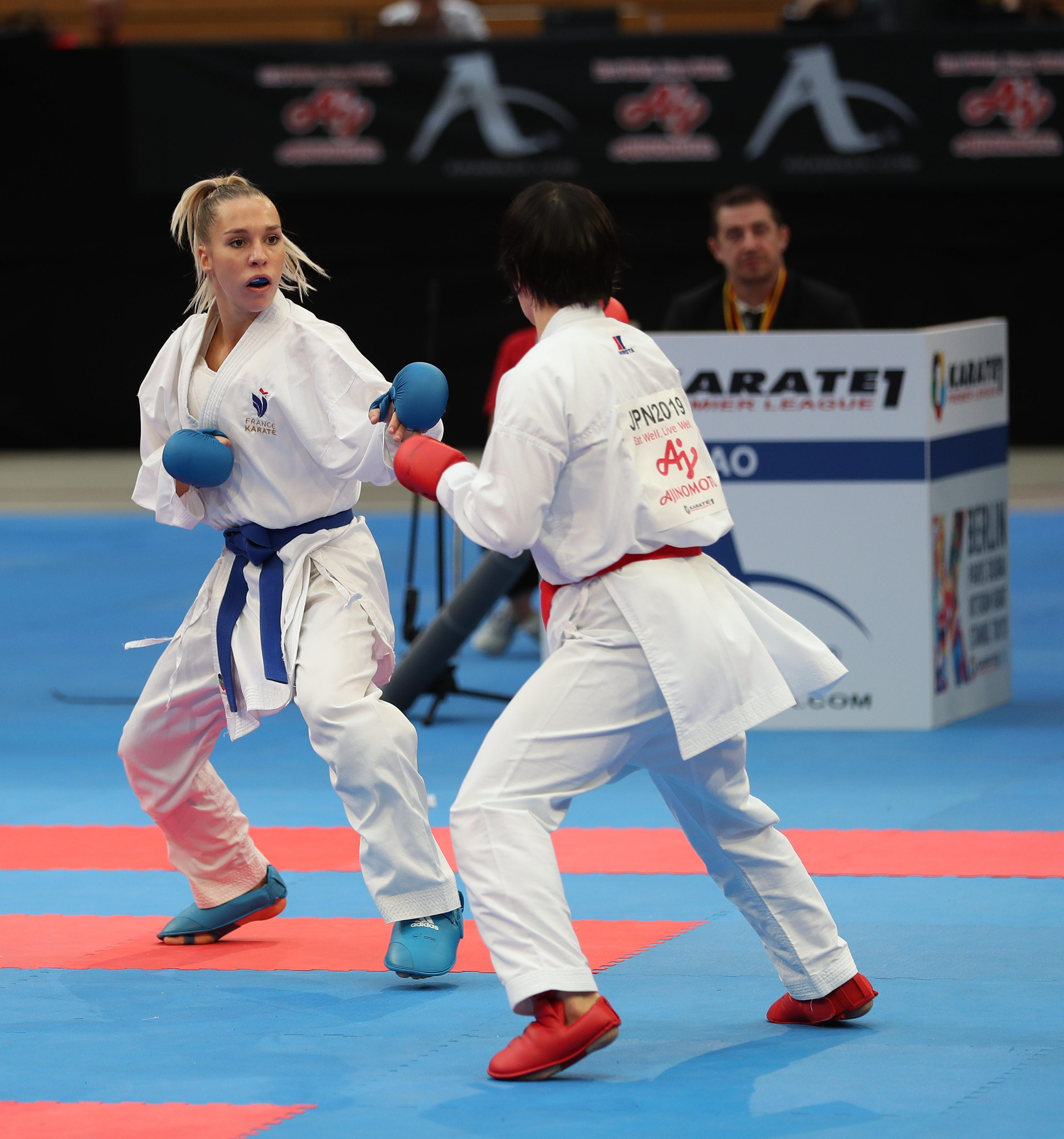
Gwendoline Philippe at K1PL Berlin 2018

At the 2018 European Karate Championships held in Novi Sad, Serbia, Philippe won the bronze medal in the team kumite event. She won the gold medal in her event at the 2019 World Cadet, Junior and U21 Karate Championships held in Santiago, Chile.

== Achievements ==
Year	Competition	Venue	Rank	Event
2018	European Championships	Novi Sad, Serbia	3rd	Team kumite
2019	European Games	Minsk, Belarus	3rd	Kumite 61 kg
