= 2022 World Cadet, Junior and U21 Karate Championships =

2022 U21, Junior & Cadet World Championships
- Venue: Karatay Congress and Sport Center
- Location: Konya, Turkey
- Dates: 26–30 October
- Competitors: 1779 from 98 nations

The 2022 World Cadet, Junior and U21 Karate Championships, was a karate event held in Konya, Turkey from 26 to 30 October 2022.

== Age divisions ==
Cadets 14-16 / Juniors 16-18 / Espoirs 18-21

== Medal table ==
* Host nation (Turkey)

Rank	Nation	Gold	Silver	Bronze	Total
1	Japan	10	0	3	13
2	Turkey*	4	5	3	12
3	Egypt	4	2	5	11
4	Algeria	3	0	0	3
5	Kazakhstan	2	1	1	4
6	Azerbaijan	2	0	2	4
7	Jordan	1	3	3	7
8	Germany	1	3	0	4
9	Saudi Arabia	1	2	0	3
9	Vietnam	1	2	0	3
11	France	1	1	8	10
12	Italy	1	0	6	7
13	Montenegro	1	0	2	3
14	Croatia	1	0	1	2
15	Greece	1	0	0	1
15	Iran	1	0	0	1
17	Morocco	0	3	5	8
18	Spain	0	2	5	7
19	Indonesia	0	2	1	3
20	North Macedonia	0	2	0	2
21	Bosnia and Herzegovina	0	1	3	4
22	Hungary	0	1	1	2
22	Netherlands	0	1	1	2
22	Tunisia	0	1	1	2
25	Czech Republic	0	1	0	1
25	Estonia	0	1	0	1
25	Poland	0	1	0	1
28	Ukraine	0	0	5	5
29	Slovakia	0	0	2	2
30	Argentina	0	0	1	1
30	Australia	0	0	1	1
30	Canada	0	0	1	1
30	El Salvador	0	0	1	1
30	England	0	0	1	1
30	Libya	0	0	1	1
30	Philippines	0	0	1	1
30	Romania	0	0	1	1
30	Scotland	0	0	1	1
30	Slovenia	0	0	1	1
30	Thailand	0	0	1	1
Totals (40 entries)		35	35	69	139

== U-21 ==
=== Men ===
Event	Gold	Silver	Bronze
Kata	Sakichi Abe; Japan	Duc Anh Nguyen; Vietnam	Enes Özdemir; Turkey
Kata	Sakichi Abe; Japan	Duc Anh Nguyen; Vietnam	Alessio Ghinami; Italy
Kumite −60 kg	Aminagha Guliyev; Azerbaijan	Pavle Dujaković; Bosnia and Herzegovina	Nikita Filipov; Ukraine
Kumite −60 kg	Aminagha Guliyev; Azerbaijan	Pavle Dujaković; Bosnia and Herzegovina	Mohamed Salah; Egypt
Kumite −67 kg	Abdallah Hammad; Jordan	Said Oubaya; Morocco	Iván Gómez Campanario; Spain
Kumite −67 kg	Abdallah Hammad; Jordan	Said Oubaya; Morocco	Ryoma Kitashiro; Japan
Kumite −75 kg	Alireza Heydari; Iran	Ömer Faruk Yürür; Turkey	Hasan Masarweh; Jordan
Kumite −75 kg	Alireza Heydari; Iran	Ömer Faruk Yürür; Turkey	Sebastiaan van Teeffelen; Netherlands
Kumite −84 kg	Matteo Fiore; Italy	Vitomir Trajkovski; North Macedonia	Mohammed Aljafari; Jordan
Kumite −84 kg	Matteo Fiore; Italy	Vitomir Trajkovski; North Macedonia	Achraf Hbila; Morocco
Kumite +84 kg	Sanad Sufyani; Saudi Arabia	Stefan Stojanovikj; North Macedonia	Anes Bostandzic; Bosnia and Herzegovina
Kumite +84 kg	Sanad Sufyani; Saudi Arabia	Stefan Stojanovikj; North Macedonia	James Francis; England

=== Women ===
Event	Gold	Silver	Bronze
Kata	Mirisa Ohuchi; Japan	Damayanti Marzella; Indonesia	Nourhan Sewidan; Egypt
Kata	Mirisa Ohuchi; Japan	Damayanti Marzella; Indonesia	Sakura Alforte; Philippines
Kumite −50 kg	Cylia Ouikene; Algeria	Hiba Fellaoui; Morocco	Gabriella Izaguirre; El Salvador
Kumite −50 kg	Cylia Ouikene; Algeria	Hiba Fellaoui; Morocco	Ema Sgardelli; Croatia
Kumite −55 kg	Louiza Abouriche; Algeria	Bella Samasheva; Kazakhstan	Sonia Villalobos; Spain
Kumite −55 kg	Louiza Abouriche; Algeria	Bella Samasheva; Kazakhstan	Tylla Levacher; France
Kumite −61 kg	Gülbahar Gözütok; Turkey	Reem Khamis; Germany	Iosune Urra Beraza; Spain
Kumite −61 kg	Gülbahar Gözütok; Turkey	Reem Khamis; Germany	Jennifer Zameto; France
Kumite −68 kg	Thalya Sombe; France	Sudenur Aksoy; Turkey	Tsubasa Kama; Japan
Kumite −68 kg	Thalya Sombe; France	Sudenur Aksoy; Turkey	Elizabeta Molnar; Slovenia
Kumite +68 kg	Sara Terazawa; Japan	Martina Šáchová; Czech Republic	Niamh Junner; Scotland
Kumite +68 kg	Sara Terazawa; Japan	Martina Šáchová; Czech Republic	Milena Jovanovic; Montenegro

== Junior ==
=== Men ===
Event	Gold	Silver	Bronze
Kata	Rizuki Saito; Japan	Furkan Kaynar; Turkey	Ivan Martin Montenegro; Spain
Kata	Rizuki Saito; Japan	Furkan Kaynar; Turkey	Lucas Hoffmann; France
Team kata (Junior + Cadet)	Japan	Turkey	France
Team kata (Junior + Cadet)	Japan	Turkey	Morocco
Kumite −55 kg	Farid Savadov; Azerbaijan	Mathias Kerneur; France	Waseem Salamaeh; Jordan
Kumite −55 kg	Farid Savadov; Azerbaijan	Mathias Kerneur; France	Guido Squillante; Italy
Kumite −61 kg	Maxim Moskvichyov; Kazakhstan	Abdulaziz Alsaif; Saudi Arabia	Luka Pejić; Bosnia and Herzegovina
Kumite −61 kg	Maxim Moskvichyov; Kazakhstan	Abdulaziz Alsaif; Saudi Arabia	Zaid Slassi; Morocco
Kumite −68 kg	Enes Fatih Kurt; Turkey	Ali Mugari; Saudi Arabia	Ismaila Cissokho; France
Kumite −68 kg	Enes Fatih Kurt; Turkey	Ali Mugari; Saudi Arabia	Rashid Suleymanov; Azerbaijan
Kumite −76 kg	Emre Saljiu; Montenegro	Saif Bani Fares; Jordan	Youssef Farag; Egypt
Kumite −76 kg	Emre Saljiu; Montenegro	Saif Bani Fares; Jordan	Süleyman Aydemir; Turkey
Kumite +76 kg	Yusuf Eren Temizel; Turkey	Yousef Nofal; Jordan	Alisher Taizhan; Kazakhstan
Kumite +76 kg	Yusuf Eren Temizel; Turkey	Yousef Nofal; Jordan	Hamza Labid; Morocco

=== Women ===
Event	Gold	Silver	Bronze
Kata	Aoba Furukawa; Japan	Paola García Lozano; Spain	Oonah Gamboa; Canada
Kata	Aoba Furukawa; Japan	Paola García Lozano; Spain	Jana Khamis; Egypt
Team kata (Junior + Cadet)	Japan	Egypt	Spain
Team kata (Junior + Cadet)	Japan	Egypt	Indonesia
Kumite −48 kg	Ganna Aly; Egypt	Phuong Thao Nguyen; Vietnam	Polina Marchenko; Ukraine
Kumite −48 kg	Ganna Aly; Egypt	Phuong Thao Nguyen; Vietnam	Emma Colletti; Italy
Kumite −53 kg	Nguyen Thi Dieu Ly; Vietnam	Nejma Imitik; Morocco	Nina Kvasnicova; Slovakia
Kumite −53 kg	Nguyen Thi Dieu Ly; Vietnam	Nejma Imitik; Morocco	Rebecca Ortu; Italy
Kumite −59 kg	Fatma Sorour; Egypt	Emma Lili Loyal; Hungary	Emina Sipovic; Bosnia and Herzegovina
Kumite −59 kg	Fatma Sorour; Egypt	Emma Lili Loyal; Hungary	Irene Marturano; Italy
Kumite +59 kg	Hannah Riedel; Germany	Rahma Tolba; Egypt	Anna Pia Desiderio; Italy
Kumite +59 kg	Hannah Riedel; Germany	Rahma Tolba; Egypt	Maroua Eddarhri; Morocco

== Cadet ==
=== Men ===
Event	Gold	Silver	Bronze
Kata	Ukyo Tatsumi; Japan	Jonas Abu Wahib; Germany	Azusa Takata; Romania
Kata	Ukyo Tatsumi; Japan	Jonas Abu Wahib; Germany	Azusa Takata; Australia
Kumite −52 kg	Abdalla Aly Eltohamy; Egypt	Heidar Safi; Germany	Ismayil Khamoyev; Azerbaijan
Kumite −52 kg	Abdalla Aly Eltohamy; Egypt	Heidar Safi; Germany	Juki Fukushima; Japan
Kumite −57 kg	Mohamed Ashraf; Egypt	Thomas Krijnen; Netherlands	Natthakrit Ingloy; Thailand
Kumite −57 kg	Mohamed Ashraf; Egypt	Thomas Krijnen; Netherlands	Nazarii Prannychuk; Ukraine
Kumite −63 kg	Nazim Douaidi; Algeria	İslam Mustafa Ograglı; Turkey	Karim Ahmed; Egypt
Kumite −63 kg	Nazim Douaidi; Algeria	İslam Mustafa Ograglı; Turkey	Albasheer Alduweebi; Libya
Kumite −70 kg	Alikhan Kadyrgali; Kazakhstan	Waleed Qatamish; Jordan	Patricio Montalbetti; Argentina
Kumite −70 kg	Alikhan Kadyrgali; Kazakhstan	Waleed Qatamish; Jordan	Saad Yassin; Egypt
Kumite +70 kg	Ilias Psomas; Greece	Saveli Bolotskihh; Estonia	Rayen Ghazouani; Tunisia
Kumite +70 kg	Ilias Psomas; Greece	Saveli Bolotskihh; Estonia	Adam Tadjer; France

=== Women ===
Event	Gold	Silver	Bronze
Kata	Azusa Takata; Japan	Nadlima Layla; Indonesia	Tuğba Süngü; Turkey
Kata	Azusa Takata; Japan	Nadlima Layla; Indonesia	Maï-Linh Bui; France
Kumite −47 kg	Towana Uchida; Japan	Zuzanna Dopieralska; Poland	Elsa Schmitt; France
Kumite −47 kg	Towana Uchida; Japan	Zuzanna Dopieralska; Poland	Anna Yashchyshyn; Ukraine
Kumite −54 kg	Buse Kılıç; Turkey	Maysa Ksantini; Tunisia	Jovana Damnjanovic; Montenegro
Kumite −54 kg	Buse Kılıç; Turkey	Maysa Ksantini; Tunisia	Alexandra Zeumerova; Slovakia
Kumite +54 kg	Sara Tomic; Croatia	Mireia Villanueva; Spain	Anna Kopfer; Hungary
Kumite +54 kg	Sara Tomic; Croatia	Mireia Villanueva; Spain	Daria Bulay; Ukraine

== Participating nations ==
1779 athletes from 98 countries participated:

- Albania (6)
- Algeria (29)
- Argentina (7)
- Armenia (14)
- Australia (25)
- Austria (16)
- Azerbaijan (28)
- Belgium (17)
- Bolivia (1)
- Bosnia and Herzegovina (33)
- Brazil (35)
- Bulgaria (15)
- Cambodia (4)
- Canada (34)
- Chile (21)
- Chinese Taipei (33)
- Colombia (24)
- Costa Rica (3)
- Croatia (37)
- Croatia (2)
- Cyprus (23)
- Czech Republic (25)
- Denmark (24)
- Ecuador (7)
- Egypt (36)
- El Salvador (2)
- England (27)
- Estonia (10)
- Finland (5)
- France (37)
- Georgia (17)
- Germany (35)
- Greece (33)
- Guatemala (1)
- Hong Kong (20)
- Hungary (26)
- Iceland (3)
- India (25)
- Indonesia (17)
- Iraq (16)
- Ireland (12)
- Iran (37)
- Israel (13)
- Italy (38)
- Japan (39)
- Jordan (22)
- Kazakhstan (34)
- Kosovo (19)
- Kuwait (23)
- Kyrgyzstan (12)
- Latvia (21)
- Libya (4)
- Lithuania (7)
- Luxembourg (10)
- Madagascar (2)
- Malaysia (6)
- Malta (10)
- Mexico (32)
- Moldova (3)
- Montenegro (27)
- Morocco (27)
- Nauru (2)
- Netherlands (19)
- New Zealand (15)
- North Macedonia (34)
- Northern Ireland (2)
- Norway (7)
- Pakistan (3)
- Palestine (10)
- Peru (10)
- Philippines (1)
- Poland (30)
- Portugal (27)
- Qatar (2)
- South Korea (2)
- Romania (33)
- San Marino (1)
- Saudi Arabia (20)
- Scotland (14)
- Senegal (8)
- Serbia (34)
- Singapore (2)
- Slovakia (33)
- Slovenia (21)
- South Africa (23)
- Spain (38)
- Sweden (9)
- Switzerland (19)
- Thailand (8)
- Tunisia (14)
- Turkey (39)
- Ukraine (33)
- United Arab Emirates (2)
- United States (36)
- Uzbekistan (17)
- Venezuela (24)
- Vietnam (12)
- Wales (4)

|}
