= 2024 World Cadet, Junior and U21 Karate Championships =

2024 U21, Junior & Cadet World Championships
- Venue: Palazzo del Turismo
- Location: Venice, Italy
- Dates: 9–13 October
- Competitors: 1960 from 105 nations

The 2024 World Cadet, Junior and U21 Karate Championships, is a karate event held in Venice, Italy from 9 to 13 October 2024.

== Medal table ==
* Host nation (Italy)

Rank	Nation	Gold	Silver	Bronze	Total
1	Japan	12	0	3	15
2	Egypt	6	4	5	15
3	Italy*	5	2	8	15
4	Turkey	2	1	2	5
5	Sweden	2	1	0	3
6	France	2	0	9	11
7	Ukraine	2	0	3	5
8	Saudi Arabia	1	3	3	7
9	Croatia	1	2	3	6
10	Jordan	1	2	0	3
11	Kazakhstan	1	1	2	4
12	Iran	1	0	1	2
13	Palestine	1	0	0	1
14	Spain	0	3	4	7
–	Individual Neutral Athletes	0	2	3	5
15	Bosnia and Herzegovina	0	2	1	3
15	Germany	0	2	1	3
17	Portugal	0	1	3	4
17	Slovakia	0	1	3	4
19	Belgium	0	1	2	3
20	Brazil	0	1	1	2
20	Montenegro	0	1	1	2
20	Thailand	0	1	1	2
20	Vietnam	0	1	1	2
24	Czech Republic	0	1	0	1
24	Guatemala	0	1	0	1
24	Poland	0	1	0	1
24	Scotland	0	1	0	1
24	Serbia	0	1	0	1
29	United States	0	0	2	2
30	Argentina	0	0	1	1
30	Austria	0	0	1	1
30	Azerbaijan	0	0	1	1
30	Bulgaria	0	0	1	1
30	Denmark	0	0	1	1
30	Georgia	0	0	1	1
30	Greece	0	0	1	1
30	Hungary	0	0	1	1
30	Mexico	0	0	1	1
30	North Macedonia	0	0	1	1
30	Romania	0	0	1	1
30	Senegal	0	0	1	1
Totals (41 entries)		37	37	74	148

== U-21 ==
=== Men ===
Event	Gold	Silver	Bronze
Kata	Anthony Vu; Sweden	Roman Hrčka; Slovakia	Abdelrahman Elmowafi; Egypt
Kata	Anthony Vu; Sweden	Roman Hrčka; Slovakia	Taiga Ishikawa; Japan
Kumite −60 kg	Nuri Kılıç; Turkey	Amin Abdelmalki; Belgium	Janco Dorta; United States
Kumite −60 kg	Nuri Kılıç; Turkey	Amin Abdelmalki; Belgium	Mohamed Youssef; Egypt
Kumite −67 kg	Adel Omara; Egypt	Akhmed Akhmedov; Authorised Neutral Athletes	Guilherme Goncalves; Portugal
Kumite −67 kg	Adel Omara; Egypt	Akhmed Akhmedov; Authorised Neutral Athletes	Muhammed Özdemir; Germany
Kumite −75 kg	Ömer Faruk Yürür; Turkey	Youssef Farag; Egypt	Heorhii Pitsul; Ukraine
Kumite −75 kg	Ömer Faruk Yürür; Turkey	Youssef Farag; Egypt	Ika Sulamanidze; Georgia
Kumite −84 kg	Omar Osman; Egypt	Mohammad Aljafari; Jordan	Yosuke Abe; Japan
Kumite −84 kg	Omar Osman; Egypt	Mohammad Aljafari; Jordan	Anas Alzahrani; Saudi Arabia
Kumite +84 kg	Matteo Avanzini; Italy	Anes Bostandzic; Bosnia and Herzegovina	Stefan Stojanovikj; North Macedonia
Kumite +84 kg	Matteo Avanzini; Italy	Anes Bostandzic; Bosnia and Herzegovina	Borja Gutiérrez Marques; Spain

=== Women ===
Event	Gold	Silver	Bronze
Kata	Kotomi Sato; Japan	Paola García; Spain	Natasa Gamova; Slovakia
Kata	Kotomi Sato; Japan	Paola García; Spain	Orsola Donofrio; Italy
Kumite −50 kg	Mizuki Ishihara; Japan	Ema Sgardelli; Croatia	Valeriia Sergaieva; Ukraine
Kumite −50 kg	Mizuki Ishihara; Japan	Ema Sgardelli; Croatia	Yalda Naghibeiranvand; Iran
Kumite −55 kg	Fatemeh Zahra Saeidabadi; Iran	Menatalah Elhawary; Egypt	Nina Kvasnicová; Slovakia
Kumite −55 kg	Fatemeh Zahra Saeidabadi; Iran	Menatalah Elhawary; Egypt	Sirikamonnate Chokprasertgul; Thailand
Kumite −61 kg	Rahma Tolba; Egypt	Anastasiia Semenenko; Germany	Emina Sipović; Bosnia and Herzegovina
Kumite −61 kg	Rahma Tolba; Egypt	Anastasiia Semenenko; Germany	Darija Šnajder; Croatia
Kumite −68 kg	Thalya Sombé; France	Marina Kurteš; Bosnia and Herzegovina	Sudenur Aksoy; Turkey
Kumite −68 kg	Thalya Sombé; France	Marina Kurteš; Bosnia and Herzegovina	Anna Pia Desiderio; Italy
Kumite +68 kg	Sophie Bednarski; Sweden	Daria Iushkova; Authorised Neutral Athletes	Asia Pergolesi; Italy
Kumite +68 kg	Sophie Bednarski; Sweden	Daria Iushkova; Authorised Neutral Athletes	Nikolina Golomboš; Croatia

== Junior ==
=== Men ===
Event	Gold	Silver	Bronze
Kata	Soshi Okumura; Japan	Tomas Izan Lopez; Spain	Thomas Klemz; France
Kata	Soshi Okumura; Japan	Tomas Izan Lopez; Spain	João Vieira; Portugal
Team kata (Junior + Cadet)	Japan; Haru Furuse; Soshi Okumura; Kodai Tai	Portugal; Vasco Mateus; Martim Oliveira; João Vieira	Italy; Salvatore Camanzo; Emanuele Caponera; Emanuel Romagnoli
Team kata (Junior + Cadet)	Japan; Haru Furuse; Soshi Okumura; Kodai Tai	Portugal; Vasco Mateus; Martim Oliveira; João Vieira	United States; Daniel Ho; David Ho; Mateo Nacu; Lance Santos
Kumite −55 kg	Hani Rashid; Jordan	Thanakorn Taolek; Thailand	Miras Abdikadyr; Kazakhstan
Kumite −55 kg	Hani Rashid; Jordan	Thanakorn Taolek; Thailand	Ali Alariani; Saudi Arabia
Kumite −61 kg	Emanuele Califano; Italy	Saad AlSaif; Saudi Arabia	Yasin Bettache; France
Kumite −61 kg	Emanuele Califano; Italy	Saad AlSaif; Saudi Arabia	Alexandre Neagu Barzan; Romania
Kumite −68 kg	Ashraf Mohamed; Egypt	Alvise Toniolo; Italy	Hairiss Hierso; France
Kumite −68 kg	Ashraf Mohamed; Egypt	Alvise Toniolo; Italy	Ahmet Öztürk; Turkey
Kumite −76 kg	Alikhan Kadyrgali; Kazakhstan	Sven Strahija; Croatia	Iker Leal Moreno; Spain
Kumite −76 kg	Alikhan Kadyrgali; Kazakhstan	Sven Strahija; Croatia	Yacine Ben Fathallah; France
Kumite +76 kg	Abdullah AlQahtani; Saudi Arabia	Federico Supino; Italy	Serigne Mbacke Seck; Senegal
Kumite +76 kg	Abdullah AlQahtani; Saudi Arabia	Federico Supino; Italy	Lukáš Bohunický; Slovakia

=== Women ===
Event	Gold	Silver	Bronze
Kata	Azusa Takata; Japan	Yasmin Henrique; Brazil	Julieta Fotheringham; Spain
Kata	Azusa Takata; Japan	Yasmin Henrique; Brazil	Bùi Ngọc Nhi; Vietnam
Team kata (Junior + Cadet)	Japan; Non Hori; Miu Kishida; Misa Kobayashi	Spain; Judith Nieto; Abril Madrid; Beatriz Carballo; Lucia Rodrigo Diaz	Italy; Francesca Crucitti; Roberta Dominici; Martina Padoan
Team kata (Junior + Cadet)	Japan; Non Hori; Miu Kishida; Misa Kobayashi	Spain; Judith Nieto; Abril Madrid; Beatriz Carballo; Lucia Rodrigo Diaz	Egypt; Maryam Abdelghany; Mariam Elezaby; Habiba Moussa; Jana Raafat
Kumite −48 kg	Ludovica Legittimo; Italy	Agnes Nyman; Sweden	Towana Uchida; Japan
Kumite −48 kg	Ludovica Legittimo; Italy	Agnes Nyman; Sweden	Arnella Gubashieva; Authorised Neutral Athletes
Kumite −53 kg	Juria Natori; Japan	Alexandra Wolf; Germany	Elsa Schmitt; France
Kumite −53 kg	Juria Natori; Japan	Alexandra Wolf; Germany	Sofiia Liaskalo; Authorised Neutral Athletes
Kumite −59 kg	Monica Arzumian; France	Gulnur Koishybay; Kazakhstan	Gulay Orujova; Azerbaijan
Kumite −59 kg	Monica Arzumian; France	Gulnur Koishybay; Kazakhstan	Violetta Makarenko; Ukraine
Kumite −66 kg	Mariam Tantawi; Egypt	Elize Bauld; Scotland	Eirini Katsika; Greece
Kumite −66 kg	Mariam Tantawi; Egypt	Elize Bauld; Scotland	Elisa Cattaneo; Italy
Kumite +66 kg	Sara Tomić; Croatia	Amálie Haková; Czech Republic	Jovana Damjanović; Montenegro
Kumite +66 kg	Sara Tomić; Croatia	Amálie Haková; Czech Republic	Malak Elbarbary; Egypt

== Cadet ==
=== Men ===
Event	Gold	Silver	Bronze
Kata	Takeru Hamazawa; Japan	Tarık Koç; Turkey	Matteo Freda; Italy
Kata	Takeru Hamazawa; Japan	Tarık Koç; Turkey	Vasco Mateus; Portugal
Kumite −52 kg	Maksym Viechkanov; Ukraine	Arafat Abdulrahman; Saudi Arabia	Leonardo Nascimento; Brazil
Kumite −52 kg	Maksym Viechkanov; Ukraine	Arafat Abdulrahman; Saudi Arabia	Alim Tekuev; Individual Neutral Athletes
Kumite −57 kg	Kabu Yagura; Japan	Hatem Al-Harasees; Jordan	David Ríos García; Spain
Kumite −57 kg	Kabu Yagura; Japan	Hatem Al-Harasees; Jordan	Leo Lambert; France
Kumite −63 kg	Mouaz Mostafa; Egypt	Jorge Flores Ortiz; Guatemala	Nikola Birač; Croatia
Kumite −63 kg	Mouaz Mostafa; Egypt	Jorge Flores Ortiz; Guatemala	Rayan Zoueini; Belgium
Kumite −70 kg	Almerico Tommasino; Italy	Jusuf Saljiu; Montenegro	Lisandro Fontana; Argentina
Kumite −70 kg	Almerico Tommasino; Italy	Jusuf Saljiu; Montenegro	Bader Al-Bargawi; Saudi Arabia
Kumite +70 kg	Arashi Chiba; Japan	Amro Al-Bargawi; Saudi Arabia	Sungkar Kanibek; Kazakhstan
Kumite +70 kg	Arashi Chiba; Japan	Amro Al-Bargawi; Saudi Arabia	Lenny Malcoiffe; France

=== Women ===
Event	Gold	Silver	Bronze
Kata	Wakana Ito; Japan	Nguyen Mai Quynh Anh; Vietnam	Tamara Lehner; Austria
Kata	Wakana Ito; Japan	Nguyen Mai Quynh Anh; Vietnam	Ninon Vaucelle-Spelle; France
Kumite −47 kg	Rinri Oda; Japan	Jana Vinčić; Serbia	Malak Afifi; Egypt
Kumite −47 kg	Rinri Oda; Japan	Jana Vinčić; Serbia	Zsófia Ágnes Hefner; Hungary
Kumite −54 kg	Mariia Hnes; Ukraine	Wiktoria Kraczaj; Poland	Adriana Boyadzhieva; Bulgaria
Kumite −54 kg	Mariia Hnes; Ukraine	Wiktoria Kraczaj; Poland	Morgane Scarfone; France
Kumite −61 kg	Graziella Ecchili; Italy	Nourhan Elmorsi; Egypt	Yasmine Rejraji; Belgium
Kumite −61 kg	Graziella Ecchili; Italy	Nourhan Elmorsi; Egypt	Hannah Søndergaard; Denmark
Kumite +61 kg	Mariam Bsharat; Palestine	Roaa Mohamed; Egypt	Nicole Correddu; Italy
Kumite +61 kg	Mariam Bsharat; Palestine	Roaa Mohamed; Egypt	Valeria Linett Martinez; Mexico

== Participating nations ==
1960 athletes from 105 countries participated:

1. Albania (10)
2. Algeria (22)
3. Angola (1)
4. Argentina (10)
5. Armenia (12)
6. Australia (32)
7. Austria (14)
8. Azerbaijan (25)
9. Bangladesh (1)
10. Belgium (22)
11. Benin (4)
12. Bolivia (3)
13. Bosnia and Herzegovina (38)
14. Brazil (42)
15. Bulgaria (22)
16. Burundi (1)
17. Canada (35)
18. Chinese Taipei (17)
19. Colombia (19)
20. Costa Rica (6)
21. Croatia (40)
22. Curaçao (2)
23. Cyprus (27)
24. Czech Republic (31)
25. Denmark (28)
26. Dominican Republic (4)
27. Ecuador (3)
28. Egypt (41)
29. El Salvador (4)
30. England (34)
31. Estonia (9)
32. Finland (5)
33. France (39)
34. Georgia (19)
35. Germany (39)
36. Greece (36)
37. Guatemala (1)
38. Hong Kong (24)
39. Hungary (28)
40. Iceland (3)
41. India (7)
42. Individual Neutral Athletes - 1 (33)
43. Individual Neutral Athletes - 2 (27)
44. Indonesia (7)
45. Ireland (19)
46. Iran (19)
47. Israel (13)
48. Italy (41) (Host)
49. Jamaica (2)
50. Japan (32)
51. Jordan (10)
52. Kazakhstan (30)
53. Kosovo (28)
54. Kuwait (19)
55. Kyrgyzstan (12)
56. Latvia (27)
57. Libya (4)
58. Lithuania (16)
59. Luxembourg (24)
60. Macau (6)
61. Madagascar (1)
62. Malaysia (5)
63. Malta (12)
64. Mexico (35)
65. Moldova (11)
66. Montenegro (36)
67. Nepal (1)
68. Netherlands (16)
69. New Zealand (19)
70. North Macedonia (37)
71. Norway (10)
72. Pakistan (1)
73. Palestine (4)
74. Panama (3)
75. Paraguay (1)
76. China (12)
77. Peru (6)
78. Philippines (5)
79. Poland (35)
80. Portugal (28)
81. Puerto Rico (5)
82. Qatar (4)
83. South Korea (11)
84. Romania (35)
85. San Marino (4)
86. Saudi Arabia (27)
87. Scotland (25)
88. Senegal (4)
89. Serbia (39)
90. Singapore (1)
91. Slovakia (35)
92. Slovenia (23)
93. South Africa (26)
94. Spain (41)
95. Sweden (5)
96. Switzerland (26)
97. Thailand (12)
98. Tunisia (8)
99. Turkey (42)
100. Turkmenistan (10)
101. Ukraine (37)
102. United Arab Emirates (6)
103. United States (41)
104. Uruguay (4)
105. Venezuela (34)
106. Vietnam (10)
107. Wales (1)
