= Thalya Sombé =

French karateka (born 2003)

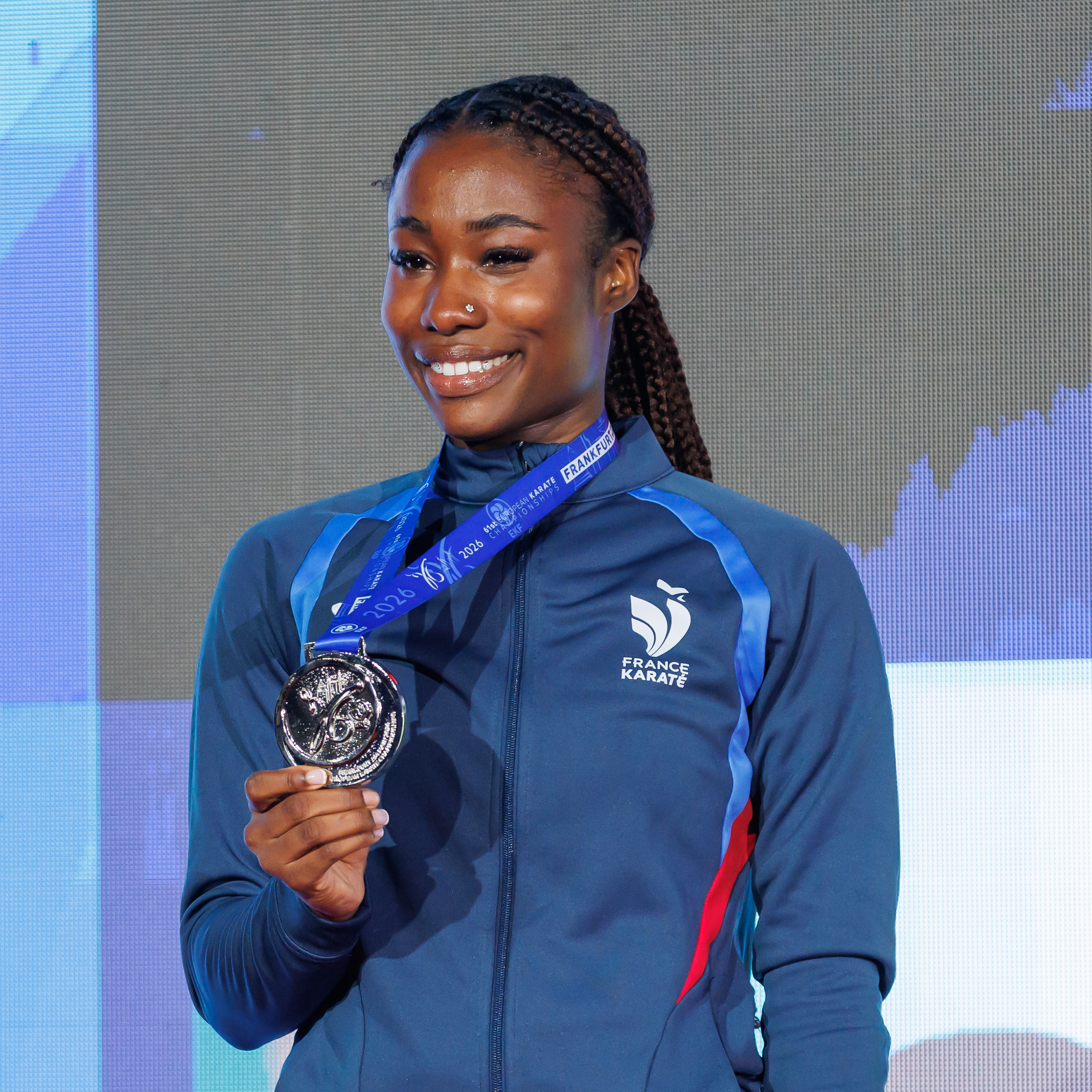
- Born: 21 October 2003 (age 22)
- Nationality: French
- Weight: 68 kg (150 lb)
- Style: Kumite

Thalya Sombé (born 21 October 2003) is a French karateka competing in the kumite. She is a gold medalist at the World Karate Championships, a three-time medalist at the European Karate Championships, and two-time gold medalist at the World U21 Championships.

== Career ==
In 2022, at the U21 World Championships, Sombé won the gold medal in the −68 kg category. In October 2023, she won one of the bronze medals in the women's team kumite event at the European Karate Championships held in Guadalajara, Spain.

In May 2024, Sombé won one of the bronze medals in the women's team kumite event at the European Karate Championships held in Zadar, Croatia. She then returned to the U21 World Championships in October and won the gold medal once again.

Sombé won a silver medal in the women's team kumite event at the 2025 European Karate Championships held in Yerevan, Armenia. She also competed in the women's 68 kg event at the 2025 World Games held in Chengdu, China. She then competed in the 68 kg event at the World Karate Championships and won the gold medal.
