= 2023 European Karate Championships – Women's 61 kg =

European Karate Championship

Women's 61 kg at the 2023 European Karate Championships
- Venue: Palacio Multiusos de Guadalajara
- Location: Guadalajara, Spain
- Dates: 22, 25 March
- Competitors: 31 from 31 nations

Medalists
gold medal	Reem Khamis	Germany
silver medal	Anita Serogina	Ukraine
bronze medal	Anna-Johanna Nilsson	Sweden
bronze medal	Konstantina Chrysopoulou	Greece

The Women's 61 kg competition at the 2023 European Karate Championships was held on 22 and 25 March 2023.

== Results ==
=== Finals ===
Semifinals
(Turkey) Gülbahar Gözütok	0
(Germany) Reem Khamis	3
(France) Laura Sivert	0
(Ukraine) Anita Serogina	1

Final
(Germany) Reem Khamis	2
(Ukraine) Anita Serogina	1

=== Repechage ===
Repechage 1
(Poland) Weronika Mikulska	3
(Croatia) Lucia Battaia	0

Repechage 2
(Poland) Weronika Mikulska	0
(Sweden) Anna-Johanna Nilsson	1

Bronze medal
(Sweden) Anna-Johanna Nilsson	3
(Turkey) Gülbahar Gözütok	0

Repechage
(Scotland) Carly McNab	0
(Greece) Konstantina Chrysopoulou	5

Bronze medal
(Greece) Konstantina Chrysopoulou	5
(France) Laura Sivert	0

=== Top half ===
==== Section 1 ====
Round of 32
(Denmark) Erika Batakujevic	1
(England) Jasmine Pomeroy	1
(Portugal) Teresa Silva	0
(Italy) Alessandra Mangiacapra	4
(Turkey) Gülbahar Gözütok	8
(Serbia) Tamara Živković	0
(Bulgaria) Ivet Goranova	3
(Bosnia and Herzegovina) Emina Sipović	4

Round of 16
(England) Jasmine Pomeroy	0
(Italy) Alessandra Mangiacapra	3
(Turkey) Gülbahar Gözütok	2
(Bosnia and Herzegovina) Emina Sipović	0

Quarterfinals
(Italy) Alessandra Mangiacapra	1
(Turkey) Gülbahar Gözütok	6

==== Section 2 ====
Round of 32
(Hungary) Aleksandra Ilankovic	0
(Romania) Miruna Mălăuţă	3
(Finland) Kiia Koponen	1
(Sweden) Anna-Johanna Nilsson	4
(Azerbaijan) Renata Arabli	0
(Croatia) Lucia Battaia	1
(Poland) Weronika Mikulska	1
(Germany) Reem Khamis	5

Round of 16
(Romania) Miruna Mălăuţă	0
(Sweden) Anna-Johanna Nilsson	5
(Croatia) Lucia Battaia	0
(Germany) Reem Khamis	2

Quarterfinals
(Sweden) Anna-Johanna Nilsson	2
(Germany) Reem Khamis	3

=== Bottom half ===
==== Section 3 ====
Round of 32
(Spain) Carlota Fernández	8
(North Macedonia) Veronika Kostovska	3
(Slovenia) Hana Debeljak	3
(Netherlands) Lynn Snel	2
(Republic of Ireland) Ayla O'Sullivan	1
(Austria) Lejla Topalovic	7
(France) Laura Sivert	1
(Switzerland) Nina Radjenovic	0

Round of 16
(Spain) Carlota Fernández	2
(Slovenia) Hana Debeljak	0
(Austria) Lejla Topalovic	0
(France) Laura Sivert	0

Quarterfinals
(Spain) Carlota Fernández	2
(France) Laura Sivert	6

==== Section 4 ====
Round of 32
(Cyprus) Anthea Stylianou	0
(Slovakia) Zuzana Schwartzová	1
(Luxembourg) Berna Allison	0
(Greece) Konstantina Chrysopoulou	5
(Montenegro) Ksenija Rajović	4
(Scotland) Carly McNab	4

Round of 16
(Slovakia) Zuzana Schwartzová	1
(Greece) Konstantina Chrysopoulou	5
(Scotland) Carly McNab	0
(Ukraine) Anita Serogina	4

Quarterfinals
(Greece) Konstantina Chrysopoulou	0
(Ukraine) Anita Serogina	6
