= African Sambo Championships =

Sports championship

African Sambo Championships are the main championships in Sambo and Combat Sambo, organized by the African Sambo Confederation.

| Edition | Year | Host city | Host country | Dates | Top of the medal table |
|---|---|---|---|---|---|
| 9 | 2014 | Yaoundé | Cameroon | 25 – 29 September 2014 | Cameroon |
| 10 | 2015 | Casablanca | Morocco | 21 – 25 May 2015 | Morocco |
| 11 | 2016 | Niamey | Niger | 27 – 29 May 2016 | Cameroon |
| 12 | 2017 | Victoria | Seychelles | 11 – 15 May 2017 | Morocco |
| 13 | 2018 | Hammamet | Tunisia | 23 – 25 June 2018 | Morocco |
| 14 | 2019 | Casablanca | Morocco | 15 – 17 June 2019 | Morocco |
| 15 | 2021 | Cairo | Egypt | 28 – 31 July 2021 | Morocco |
| 16 | 2022 | Yaoundé | Cameroon | 16 – 17 July 2022 | Cameroon |
| 17 | 2023 | Casablanca | Morocco | 20 – 22 May 2023 | Morocco |
| 18 | 2024 | Cairo | Egypt | 1 – 3 June 2024 | Egypt |
| 19 | 2025 | Conakry | Guinea | 24 – 26 May 2025 | Morocco |
| 20 | 2026 | Cairo | Egypt | 13 – 15 June 2026 | Morocco |
