= 2023 European Karate Championships – Women's team kumite =

European Karate Championship

Women's team kumite at the 2023 European Karate Championships
- Venue: Palacio Multiusos de Guadalajara
- Location: Guadalajara, Spain
- Dates: 23–25 March
- Nations: 28
- Teams: 28

Medalists
gold medal	Gizem Bugur; Reem Khamis; Johanna Kneer; Madeleine Schröter	Germany
silver medal	Sadea Bećirović; Lucija Lesjak; Lea Vukoja; Mia Greta Zorko	Croatia
bronze medal	Pamela Bodei; Clio Ferracuti; Alessandra Mangiacapra; Silvia Semeraro	Italy
bronze medal	Alizée Agier; Léa Avazeri; Thalya Sombe; Jennifer Zameto	France

The Women's team kumite competition at the 2023 European Karate Championships was held from 23 to 25 March 2023.

== Results ==
=== Finals ===
Semifinals
Germany	(6)
Finland	(1)
France	1
Croatia	2

Final
Germany	2
Croatia	0

=== Repechage ===
Repechage 1
Ireland	(2)
Italy	(9)

Repechage 2
Italy	(13)
Spain	(7)

Bronze medal
Italy	(3)
Finland	(0)

Repechage
Serbia	2
Turkey	0

Bronze medal
Serbia	0
France	2

=== Top half ===
==== Section 1 ====
Round of 32
Portugal	0
Italy	2
Ireland	0
Germany	2
Hungary	2
Switzerland	1

Round of 16
Italy	0
Germany	2
Hungary	0
Spain	2

Quarterfinals
Germany	(8)
Spain	(1)

==== Section 2 ====
Round of 32
Netherlands	0
Bosnia and Herzegovina	2
Slovenia	0
North Macedonia	2
Finland	(10)
England	(6)

Round of 16
Bosnia and Herzegovina	0
North Macedonia	2
Finland	2
Slovakia	1

Quarterfinals
North Macedonia	(4)
Finland	(10)

=== Bottom half ===
==== Section 3 ====
Round of 32
Austria	1
Azerbaijan	1
Poland	0
Ukraine	2
Sweden	(2)
Scotland	(4)

Round of 16
Azerbaijan	1
Ukraine	2
Scotland	(0)
France	(7)

Quarterfinals
Ukraine	0
France	2

==== Section 4 ====
Round of 32
Bulgaria	(6)
Cyprus	(15)
Turkey	2
Greece	0
Serbia	2
Montenegro	1

Round of 16
Cyprus	(3)
Turkey	(8)
Serbia	1
Croatia	2

Quarterfinals
Turkey	0
Croatia	2
