= Karate at the 2019 European Games – Women's kumite 61 kg =

Women's kumite 61 kg at the 2019 European Games
- Venue: Čyžoŭka-Arena
- Date: 30 June
- Competitors: 8 from 8 nations

Medalists
gold medal	Anita Serogina	Ukraine
silver medal	Tjaša Ristić	Slovenia
bronze medal	Merve Çoban	Turkey
bronze medal	Gwendoline Philippe	France

The women's kumite 61 kg competition at the 2019 European Games in Minsk was held on 30 June 2019 at the Čyžoŭka-Arena.

== Schedule ==
All times are local (UTC+3).

Date	Time	Event
Sunday, 30 June 2019	10:30	Elimination round
Sunday, 30 June 2019	15:32	Semifinals
Sunday, 30 June 2019	17:08	Final

== Results ==
=== Elimination round ===
==== Group A ====
Rank	Athlete	B	W	D	L	Pts	Score
1	Merve Çoban (TUR)	3	1	2	0	4	5–3
2	Tjaša Ristić (SLO)	3	1	1	1	3	3–3
3	Cristina Ferrer (ESP)	3	0	3	0	3	1–1
4	Anastasiya Dzyachkova (BLR)	3	0	2	1	2	3–5

	Score	
Merve Çoban (TUR)	0–0	Cristina Ferrer (ESP)
Tjaša Ristić (SLO)	2–0	Anastasiya Dzyachkova (BLR)
Tjaša Ristić (SLO)	1–1	Cristina Ferrer (ESP)
Merve Çoban (TUR)	3–3	Anastasiya Dzyachkova (BLR)
Anastasiya Dzyachkova (BLR)	0–0	Cristina Ferrer (ESP)
Merve Çoban (TUR)	2–0	Tjaša Ristić (SLO)

==== Group B ====
Rank	Athlete	B	W	D	L	Pts	Score
1	Gwendoline Philippe (FRA)	3	2	1	0	5	8–0
2	Anita Serogina (UKR)	3	2	1	0	5	7–0
3	Jovana Preković (SRB)	3	1	0	2	2	3–8
4	Bettina Alstadsæther (NOR)	3	0	0	3	0	0–10

	Score	
Gwendoline Philippe (FRA)	4–0	Bettina Alstadsæther (NOR)
Jovana Preković (SRB)	0–4	Anita Serogina (UKR)
Jovana Preković (SRB)	3–0	Bettina Alstadsæther (NOR)
Gwendoline Philippe (FRA)	0–0	Anita Serogina (UKR)
Anita Serogina (UKR)	3–0	Bettina Alstadsæther (NOR)
Gwendoline Philippe (FRA)	4–0	Jovana Preković (SRB)

=== Finals ===
Semifinals
Merve Çoban (TUR)	2
Anita Serogina (UKR)	2
Gwendoline Philippe (FRA)	2
Tjaša Ristić (SLO)	4

Final
Anita Serogina (UKR)	3
Tjaša Ristić (SLO)	1
