= 2017 African Sambo Championships =

The 2017 African Sambo Championships were held in Victoria, Seychelles from 11 to 15 May 2017.

== Medal overview ==
=== Women ===
- 64 kg

1. SITCHEPING Paule (CMR)

2. MARIE CHERYL Ella (SEY)

- 72 kg

1. FEUGANG KUETHE Edwige (CMR)

2. MARIM YAHYA Zakaria (EGY)

- +80 kg

1. FOKOU Dechantal (CMR)

2. PAYET Amanda (SEY)

3. JEEBUN HENNA Nikeeta (MRI)

=== Men ===
- 57 kg

1. ZELMOUMI Mohammed (MAR)

2. SEYNI Abdoul-rachid (NIG)

3. MOUSTAPHA Boubakari (CMR)

- 62 kg

1. KOUROU Ayoub (MAR)

2. MAKNI Sami (TUN)

3. MODIBO Coulibaly (CIV)

3. VICTORIN Lanndio (SEY)

- 68 kg

1. EL KARS Abderrahim (MAR)

2. SADFI Mohamed Tarek (TUN)

3. YANGFI Eric lionel (CMR)

- 74 kg

1. NNOUK Nwatsok (CMR)

2. HLALA Moncef (MAR)

- 82 kg

1. MESSI Louis (CMR)

2. OULHAJ Marouan (MAR)

3. FINESSE FANIRY Francis (SEY)

- 90 kg

1. CHAKIRI El houcine (MAR)

2. AMADOU MOUMOUNI Mahamadou (NIG)

3. GABRIEL Roge (SEY)

3. NDJIMA ENOWA Raoul (CMR)

- +100 kg

1. DUGASSE Dominic (SEY)

2. MAKREM Saanouni (TUN)

3. LUTCHMUN Sarvesh (MRI)

=== Combat SAMBO ===
- 62 kg

1. FOKAM Celestin (CMR)

2. LAGHFIRI Bouchaib (MAR)

3. BEN ANESS Montassar (TUN)

- 68 kg

1. MSALLMI Saifallah (TUN)

2. AMIMI Ilias (MAR)

- 3. MBOLLO Luc daniel (CMR)

3. WALID IBRAHIM Moawad (EGY)

- 74 kg

1. ZOUAD Elhoussine (MAR)

2. MBONG Rene (CMR)

3. ALCINDOR HUBERT Brian (SEY)

- 82 kg

1. BATAMAG Epoune (CMR)

2. DIANI Badreddine (MAR)

- 90 kg

1. EDDERDAK Nasser (MAR)

2. TCHAMOU Mickael (CMR)

3. WALID RAEY Mohamed (EGY)

- 100 kg

1. KARROUTI Reda (MAR)

2. IMARIRENE Mohamed (ALG)

=== Medals table ===
Teams Gold Silver Bronze Total

Morocco 7 5 0 12

Cameroon 7 2 4 13

Tunisia 1 3 1 5

Seychelles 1 2 3 6

Niger 0 2 o 2

Egypt 0 1 2 3

Algeria 0 1 0 1

Mauritius 0 0 2 2

Ivory Coast 0 0 1 1
