= 2022 Veterans World Wrestling Championships =

- Host city: Bulgaria, Plovdiv
- Dates: 4–9 October

The 2022 Veterans World Wrestling Championships was held from 4 to 9 October 2022 in Plovdiv, Bulgaria.

The competition was held in the following age categories:

- Division " A " 35 – 40 years
- Division " B " 41 – 45 years
- Division " C " 46 – 50 years
- Division " D " 51 – 55 years
- Division " E " 56 – 60 years

The weight categories are as follows:

- 55 – 62 kg
- 70 kg
- 78 kg
- 88 kg
- 100 kg
- 100 – 130 kg

== Medal table ==
* Host nation (Bulgaria)

Rank	Nation	Gold	Silver	Bronze	Total
1	United States	11	11	15	37
2	Turkey	6	2	5	13
3	Kazakhstan	5	8	5	18
4	Sweden	5	6	5	16
5	Germany	4	2	9	15
6	Egypt	2	7	4	13
7	Romania	2	3	1	6
8	Jordan	2	2	0	4
9	Bulgaria*	2	1	9	12
10	France	2	1	8	11
11	Kyrgyzstan	2	1	4	7
12	Italy	2	1	1	4
13	Georgia	2	0	1	3
13	Moldova	2	0	1	3
13	Slovakia	2	0	1	3
16	Estonia	2	0	0	2
17	Poland	1	2	2	5
18	Hungary	1	1	7	9
19	Norway	1	1	0	2
20	Finland	1	0	2	3
21	Saudi Arabia	1	0	1	2
22	Serbia	1	0	0	1
22	South Africa	1	0	0	1
24	Mongolia	0	2	5	7
25	Latvia	0	2	0	2
26	India	0	1	2	3
27	Greece	0	1	1	2
28	Armenia	0	1	0	1
28	Azerbaijan	0	1	0	1
28	Croatia	0	1	0	1
28	Tajikistan	0	1	0	1
32	Spain	0	0	2	2
33	Albania	0	0	1	1
33	Iran	0	0	1	1
33	Israel	0	0	1	1
33	Lithuania	0	0	1	1
33	Pakistan	0	0	1	1
33	Ukraine	0	0	1	1
33	Uzbekistan	0	0	1	1
Totals (39 entries)		60	59	98	217

== Medal summary ==
=== Men's freestyle ===
==== Veterans A ====
Event	Gold	Silver	Bronze
62 kg	Mostafa Hassan Mohamed; Egypt	Nathan Hansen; United States	Amantay Nuradilov; Kazakhstan
62 kg	Mostafa Hassan Mohamed; Egypt	Nathan Hansen; United States	Baasanjav Khasdorj; Mongolia
70 kg	Nurlan Bekzhanov; Kazakhstan	Reece Humphrey; United States	Oleksandr Kosyntsev; Ukraine
70 kg	Nurlan Bekzhanov; Kazakhstan	Reece Humphrey; United States	Jordin Humphrey; United States
78 kg	Abdulhamit Altun; Turkey	Walter Saunders; United States	Alexandru Burca; Moldova
78 kg	Abdulhamit Altun; Turkey	Walter Saunders; United States	Jagmander; India
88 kg	Abay Smagulov; Kazakhstan	Mohinder Singh; India	İsmet Karabulut; Turkey
88 kg	Abay Smagulov; Kazakhstan	Mohinder Singh; India	Roman Sarybaev; Kyrgyzstan
100 kg	Ahmet Bilici; Turkey	Armands Zvirbulis; Latvia	Dragomir Stoychev; Bulgaria
100 kg	Ahmet Bilici; Turkey	Armands Zvirbulis; Latvia	Ali İmamoğlu; Turkey
130 kg	Daniel Erekson; United States	Mohamed Omara; Egypt	Faruk Akkoyun; Turkey

==== Veterans B ====
Event	Gold	Silver	Bronze
62 kg	Jaanek Lips; Estonia	Dan Stefan Popa; Romania	Svetoslav Dimitrov; Bulgaria
62 kg	Jaanek Lips; Estonia	Dan Stefan Popa; Romania	Tarek Abouelwafa Omar; Egypt
70 kg	Vadim Guigolaev; France	Hassan Madani; Egypt	Leevy Carlton Mears; United States
70 kg	Vadim Guigolaev; France	Hassan Madani; Egypt	Lkhagvasuren Uriankhai; Mongolia
78 kg	Csaba Fazakas; Romania	Nikolay Kassyanik; Kazakhstan	Mario Haselbauer; Germany
88 kg	Yessentay Khapar; Kazakhstan	Mohamed Atfet Ahmed; Egypt	James Robert Medeiros; United States
88 kg	Yessentay Khapar; Kazakhstan	Mohamed Atfet Ahmed; Egypt	Victor Ferrandiz Lagares; Spain
100 kg	Benjamin Van Rooyen; South Africa	Yahia Abutabeekh; Jordan	Ahmed Said Mohamadi; Egypt
100 kg	Benjamin Van Rooyen; South Africa	Yahia Abutabeekh; Jordan	Pawel Wolinski; Poland
130 kg	Leif Eddy Bengtsson; Sweden	Cosmin Petho; Romania	Parveen Kumar; India
130 kg	Leif Eddy Bengtsson; Sweden	Cosmin Petho; Romania	Michael Stuart Harbison; United States

==== Veterans C ====
Event	Gold	Silver	Bronze
62 kg	David Yi; United States	Khurts Janchiv; Mongolia	Robinson Prebish; United States
70 kg	Thomas Donahue; United States	Michele Rauhut; Germany	William James Anderson; United States
70 kg	Thomas Donahue; United States	Michele Rauhut; Germany	Sabyrzhan Zholdayev; Kazakhstan
78 kg	Attila Raisz; Slovakia	Rudolph John James; United States	Mohammad Ahmadi Afshar; Spain
78 kg	Attila Raisz; Slovakia	Rudolph John James; United States	Mirash Pali; Albania
88 kg	Adrian Recorean; Romania	Octavius Bellamy; United States	Henrich Pietrik; Slovakia
88 kg	Adrian Recorean; Romania	Octavius Bellamy; United States	Ion Ciprian Dascalescu; Romania
100 kg	Attila Gaál; Slovakia	Igors Samusonoks; Latvia	Nabil Yahya Hawsawi; Saudi Arabia
100 kg	Attila Gaál; Slovakia	Igors Samusonoks; Latvia	Mehmed Kodakov; Bulgaria
130 kg	Aydın Halimoğlu; Turkey	Mustafa Bayram; Turkey	Gabriel Beauperthuy; United States

==== Veterans D ====
Event	Gold	Silver	Bronze
62 kg	Remzi Osman; Bulgaria	Samat Aitkulov; Kazakhstan	Nurzhan Nurbekov; Kazakhstan
70 kg	Shamshe Tlashadze; Georgia	Maqsudov Jamshed; Tajikistan	Stefan Bittmann; Germany
78 kg	Jonathan Molfino; Italy	Lech Szczesniak; Poland	Dirk Stastny; Germany
78 kg	Jonathan Molfino; Italy	Lech Szczesniak; Poland	Kadyr Keneshov; Kyrgyzstan
88 kg	Kevin Pine; United States	Munkhchuluun Lochin; Mongolia	Not Awarded
100 kg	Chynarbek Izabekov; Kyrgyzstan	Sergey Yelisseyev; Kazakhstan	Ankhbayar Tsend; Mongolia
130 kg	George Orlando Porter; United States	Saleh Al Zriqat; Jordan	Marcho Markov; Bulgaria

==== Veterans E ====
Event	Gold	Silver	Bronze
62 kg	Boris Savva; Moldova	Winfried Hoefflich; Germany	Roger Papotto; France
62 kg	Boris Savva; Moldova	Winfried Hoefflich; Germany	Tsogtsaikhan Myagmar; Mongolia
70 kg	Stephen Horton; United States	Talant Begaliev; Kyrgyzstan	Murat Tussupbekov; Kazakhstan
70 kg	Stephen Horton; United States	Talant Begaliev; Kyrgyzstan	Antanas Merkevičius; Lithuania
78 kg	Osman Önder; Turkey	Stig-Goran Eriksson; Sweden	Turpalali Sulimanov; Kazakhstan
78 kg	Osman Önder; Turkey	Stig-Goran Eriksson; Sweden	Steffen Hampe; Germany
88 kg	Petros Petrosyan; United States	Jeffrey Anderson; United States	James Paul Miller; United States
88 kg	Petros Petrosyan; United States	Jeffrey Anderson; United States	Gyula Lakatos; Hungary
100 kg	Detlef Hein John; Germany	Charles Jones; United States	Ivan Chavov; Bulgaria
130 kg	Saadanbek Niiazov; Kyrgyzstan	Anuar Uxumbayev; Kazakhstan	Ardeshir Poorhekmat; Iran

=== Men's Greco-Roman ===
==== Veterans A ====
Event	Gold	Silver	Bronze
62 kg	Zholdybay Tokbayev; Kazakhstan	Mostafa Hassan Abdelaal; Egypt	Jarkko Wester; Sweden
70 kg	Argo Mitt; Estonia	Jarreau Blade Humphrey; United States	Aibek Berdaliev; Kyrgyzstan
70 kg	Argo Mitt; Estonia	Jarreau Blade Humphrey; United States	Murshud Mammadov; France
78 kg	Dumitru Popov; Moldova	Aake Tobias Kantola; Sweden	Serkan Kara; Turkey
78 kg	Dumitru Popov; Moldova	Aake Tobias Kantola; Sweden	Eric Buisson; France
88 kg	Andrey Samokhin; Kazakhstan	Elgiz Mammadov; Azerbaijan	Antonio Vrazhev; Bulgaria
88 kg	Andrey Samokhin; Kazakhstan	Elgiz Mammadov; Azerbaijan	Plamen Palev; Bulgaria
100 kg	Zsolt Dajka; Hungary	Mostafa Mahmoud Frhat; Egypt	Zaza Shavadze; Georgia
100 kg	Zsolt Dajka; Hungary	Mostafa Mahmoud Frhat; Egypt	Walid Said; Sweden
130 kg	Saleh Moustafa Omara; Egypt	Hristo Ivanov Georgiev; Bulgaria	Ronald Dombkowski II; United States

==== Veterans B ====
Event	Gold	Silver	Bronze
62 kg	Daniel Franke; Germany	Samat Ospan; Kazakhstan	Tarek Abouelwafa Omar; Egypt
70 kg	Milan Maric; Serbia	Hassan Ibrahim Madany; Egypt	Karl Granbom; Sweden
70 kg	Milan Maric; Serbia	Hassan Ibrahim Madany; Egypt	Mario Anzenberger; Germany
78 kg	Kurt Tommy Lundell; Sweden	Eduard Durmanov; Kazakhstan	Andrei Stashonak; United States
78 kg	Kurt Tommy Lundell; Sweden	Eduard Durmanov; Kazakhstan	Uri Markman; Israel
88 kg	Hüseyin Memi; Turkey	Dragos Ivanov; France	Mohamed Atfet Ahmed; Egypt
88 kg	Hüseyin Memi; Turkey	Dragos Ivanov; France	Gerald Dwayne Harris; United States
100 kg	Yahia Abutabeekh; Jordan	Ahmed Said Ahmed; Egypt	Jozsef Jarnovics; Hungary
100 kg	Yahia Abutabeekh; Jordan	Ahmed Said Ahmed; Egypt	Sanjar Umarkhodjaev; Uzbekistan
130 kg	Leif Bengtsson; Sweden	Marius Otelea; Romania	Petar Bogaevski; Bulgaria
130 kg	Leif Bengtsson; Sweden	Marius Otelea; Romania	Pavlin Bankov; Bulgaria

==== Veterans C ====
Event	Gold	Silver	Bronze
62 kg	David Yi; United States	Nuno Berlinda; Sweden	Michele Maggiale; Italy
70 kg	Djamel Ainaoui; France	Ghukas Sahakyan; Armenia	Amar Assaoui; France
78 kg	Jimmy Samuelsson; Sweden	Johan Mikael Hedberg; Sweden	Rudolph John James; United States
78 kg	Jimmy Samuelsson; Sweden	Johan Mikael Hedberg; Sweden	Juha Pajunen; Finland
88 kg	Octavius Bellamy; United States	Vasileios Batalas; Greece	Alvin Leroy Riggs; United States
100 kg	Nabil Yahya Hawsawi; Saudi Arabia	Tom Rune Ljosaak; Norway	Zsolt Boda; Hungary
100 kg	Nabil Yahya Hawsawi; Saudi Arabia	Tom Rune Ljosaak; Norway	Frederic Calixte; France
130 kg	Rafal Koszowski; Poland	Gabriel Beauperthuy; United States	Tsanlig Munkhbayar; Mongolia

==== Veterans D ====
Event	Gold	Silver	Bronze
62 kg	Terho Petteri Kettunen; Finland	Nurzhan Nurbekov; Kazakhstan	Karl Fredrik Kleist; Sweden
62 kg	Terho Petteri Kettunen; Finland	Nurzhan Nurbekov; Kazakhstan	Kai Martti Koivunen; Finland
70 kg	Tariel Shavadze; Georgia	Gabor Matyas; Hungary	Frederic Paul Michel; France
70 kg	Tariel Shavadze; Georgia	Gabor Matyas; Hungary	Stefan Bittmann; Germany
78 kg	Anders Roger Sjoeqvist; Sweden	Jonathan Molfino; Italy	Abdelhafid Benomari; France
78 kg	Anders Roger Sjoeqvist; Sweden	Jonathan Molfino; Italy	Ercan Ayyıldız; Turkey
88 kg	Martin Inge Dalsbotten; Norway	Jerzy Sekura; Poland	Kevin Robert Pine; United States
88 kg	Martin Inge Dalsbotten; Norway	Jerzy Sekura; Poland	Laszlo Angyal; Hungary
100 kg	Hristo Gabrovski; Bulgaria	Ivo Smrke; Croatia	Domenico Lemme; United States
100 kg	Hristo Gabrovski; Bulgaria	Ivo Smrke; Croatia	Laszlo Kertesz; Hungary
130 kg	Saleh Al Zriqat; Jordan	George Orlando Porter; United States	Muhammad Akram Khan; Pakistan

==== Veterans E ====
Event	Gold	Silver	Bronze
62 kg	Winfried Thomas Hoeflich; Germany	Kanat Galiyev; Kazakhstan	Nikolaos Tsiakaras; Greece
62 kg	Winfried Thomas Hoeflich; Germany	Kanat Galiyev; Kazakhstan	Kubanychbek Aldazhanov; Kyrgyzstan
70 kg	Domenico Piccinini; Italy	Lars Mikael Dahl; Sweden	Lars Christer Jacobson; Sweden
70 kg	Domenico Piccinini; Italy	Lars Mikael Dahl; Sweden	Piotr Dabrowski; Poland
78 kg	Osman Önder; Turkey	Stig Göran Eriksson; Sweden	Dieter Uwe Hemmann; Germany
78 kg	Osman Önder; Turkey	Stig Göran Eriksson; Sweden	Philippe Grasland; France
88 kg	Jeffrey Anderson; United States	Kevin Stowell Kares; United States	Karoly Laszlo Szeitl; Hungary
88 kg	Jeffrey Anderson; United States	Kevin Stowell Kares; United States	Gyula Lakatos; Hungary
100 kg	Detlef Hein John; Germany	Zeki Bayraktar; Turkey	Frank Klemens Drescher; Germany
100 kg	Detlef Hein John; Germany	Zeki Bayraktar; Turkey	Anton Mayr; Germany
130 kg	Brian Alan Jones; United States	Not Awarded	Not Awarded
