= Tjaša Ristić =

Slovenian karateka

Sport
- Country: Slovenia
- Sport: Karate
- Weight class: 61 kg
- Event: Kumite
Medal record
Women's karate
Representing Slovenia
European Games
Silver medal – second place	2019 Minsk	Kumite 61 kg
European Championships
Silver medal – second place	2019 Guadalajara	Kumite 61 kg
Bronze medal – third place	2018 Novi Sad	Kumite 61 kg
Mediterranean Games
Gold medal – first place	2018 Tarragona	Kumite 61 kg

Tjaša Ristić is a Slovenian karateka. She won the silver medal in the women's kumite 61 kg event at the 2019 European Games held in Minsk, Belarus. In the final, she lost against Anita Serogina of Ukraine.

== Career ==
In 2015, Ristić lost her bronze medal match, against Ana Lenard of Croatia, in the women's kumite 61 kg at the European Games held in Baku, Azerbaijan.

At the 2018 European Karate Championships held in Novi Sad, Serbia, Ristić won one of the bronze medals in the women's kumite 61 kg event. A month later, she won the gold medal in the women's kumite 61 kg event at the 2018 Mediterranean Games held in Tarragona, Spain.

In 2021, Ristić competed at the World Olympic Qualification Tournament held in Paris, France hoping to qualify for the 2020 Summer Olympics in Tokyo, Japan. She won her first match but she was then eliminated in her next match by Nele De Vos of Belgium.

== Achievements ==
Year	Competition	Venue	Rank	Event
2018	European Championships	Novi Sad, Serbia	3rd	Kumite 61 kg
2018	Mediterranean Games	Tarragona, Spain	1st	Kumite 61 kg
2019	European Championships	Guadalajara, Spain	2nd	Kumite 61 kg
2019	European Games	Minsk, Belarus	2nd	Kumite 61 kg
