= Reem Khamis =

German karateka (born 2002)

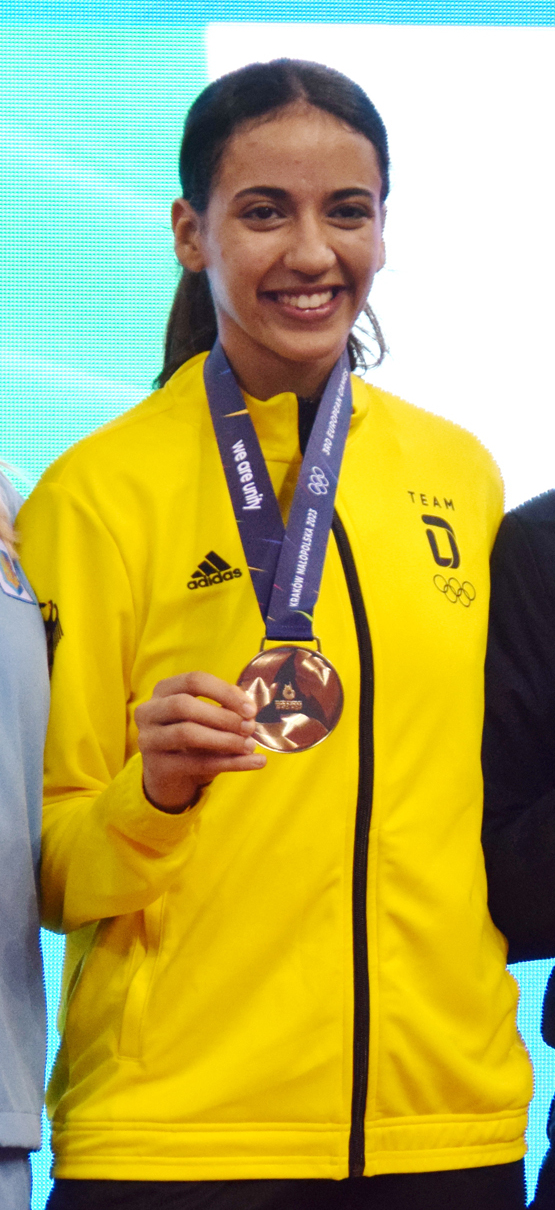
- Reem Khamis at the 2023 European Games.

Personal information
- Born: 7 December 2002 (age 23)

Sport
- Country: Germany
- Sport: Karate
- Weight class: 61 kg
- Events: Kumite; Team kumite
Medal record
Women's karate
Representing Germany
European Games
Gold medal – first place	2023 Kraków-Małopolska	Kumite 61 kg
European Championships
Gold medal – first place	2023 Guadalajara	Kumite 61 kg
Gold medal – first place	2023 Guadalajara	Team kumite
Gold medal – first place	2024 Zadar	Team kumite
Bronze medal – third place	2024 Zadar	Kumite 61 kg

Reem Khamis (born 7 December 2002) is a German karateka. She has been part of the German National Team since the middle of the 2021 year. She won the gold medal in the women's kumite 61 kg event at the 2023 European Games held in Poland. She also won the gold medal in individual 61kg event at the 2023 European Karate Championships held in Guadalajara, Spain.

== Career ==
Khamis won the silver medal in the women's U-21 61 kg event at the 2022 World Cadet, Junior and U21 Karate Championships held in Konya, Turkey.

Her success made her lead in the world ranking under U21. Currently she is ranked 2 in the world seniors ranking as well.

She became the Grand Winner in the Female -61 kg category for year 2024 by winning two bronze medals and a silver medal at three out of the four Premier League events.

She won one of the bronze medals in the women's 61 kg event at the 2024 European Karate Championships held in Zadar, Croatia. She also won the gold medal in the women's team kumite event.

In 2025, Khamis won a silver medal in Premier League held in Hangzhou, China, after sustaining an injury during the final match that led to tearing her anterior cruciate ligament.

== Life ==
She studies mechanical engineering at Hamburg University of Applied Sciences.

== Achievements ==
Year	Competition	Location	Rank	Event
2022	European Championships	Prague, Czech Republic	3rd	Kumite U21 61 kg
2022	World Championships	Konya, Turkey	2nd	Kumite 61 kg
2023	European Championships	Guadalajara, Spain	1st	Kumite 61 kg
2023	European Championships	Guadalajara, Spain	1st	Team kumite
2023	European Games	Kraków and Małopolska, Poland	1st	Kumite 61 kg
2024	European Championships	Zadar, Croatia	3rd	Kumite 61 kg
2024	European Championships	Zadar, Croatia	1st	Team kumite
2024	Karate1 Premier League	Cairo, Egypt	1st	Kumite U21 61 kg
2024	Karate1 Premier League	Casablanca, Morocco	3rd	Kumite U21 61 kg
