= Grand Prix de France Henri Deglane 2022 =

Henri Deglane Grand Prix 2022
- Host city: Nice, France
- Dates: January 20–23
- Stadium: Salle Serge Leyrit

The XXXXVIII Grand Prix de France Henri Deglane 2022 (also known as Grand Prix of France 2022 and Henri Deglane Grand Prix 2022) will be a wrestling event held in Nice, France. It was originally scheduled to be held between 20 and 23 January 2022. It is held in the memory of 1924 Olympic Gold medalist Henri Deglane.

French Wrestling Federation (Fédération de Française de Lutte) informed that the Grand Prix de France Henri Deglane 2022 is officially postponed. The decision has been taken after several meetings within the French Wrestling Federation and with the French Ministry of Sports. Given the current COVID-19 situation in France and the world, the French Wrestling Federation recognizes that they cannot organize the competition without putting at risk the athletes and staff.

== Medal overview ==
=== Men's freestyle ===
Event	Gold	Silver	Bronze
57 kg			
61 kg			
65 kg			
70 kg			
74 kg			
79 kg			
86 kg			
92 kg			
97 kg			
125 kg			

=== Greco-Roman ===
Event	Gold	Silver	Bronze
55 kg			
60 kg			
63 kg			
67 kg			
72 kg			
77 kg			
82 kg			
87 kg			
97 kg			
130 kg			

=== Women's freestyle ===
Event	Gold	Silver	Bronze
50 kg			
53 kg			
55 kg			
57 kg			
59 kg			
62 kg			
65 kg			
68 kg			
72 kg			
76 kg			
