= Anita Serogina =

Ukrainian karateka (born 1990)

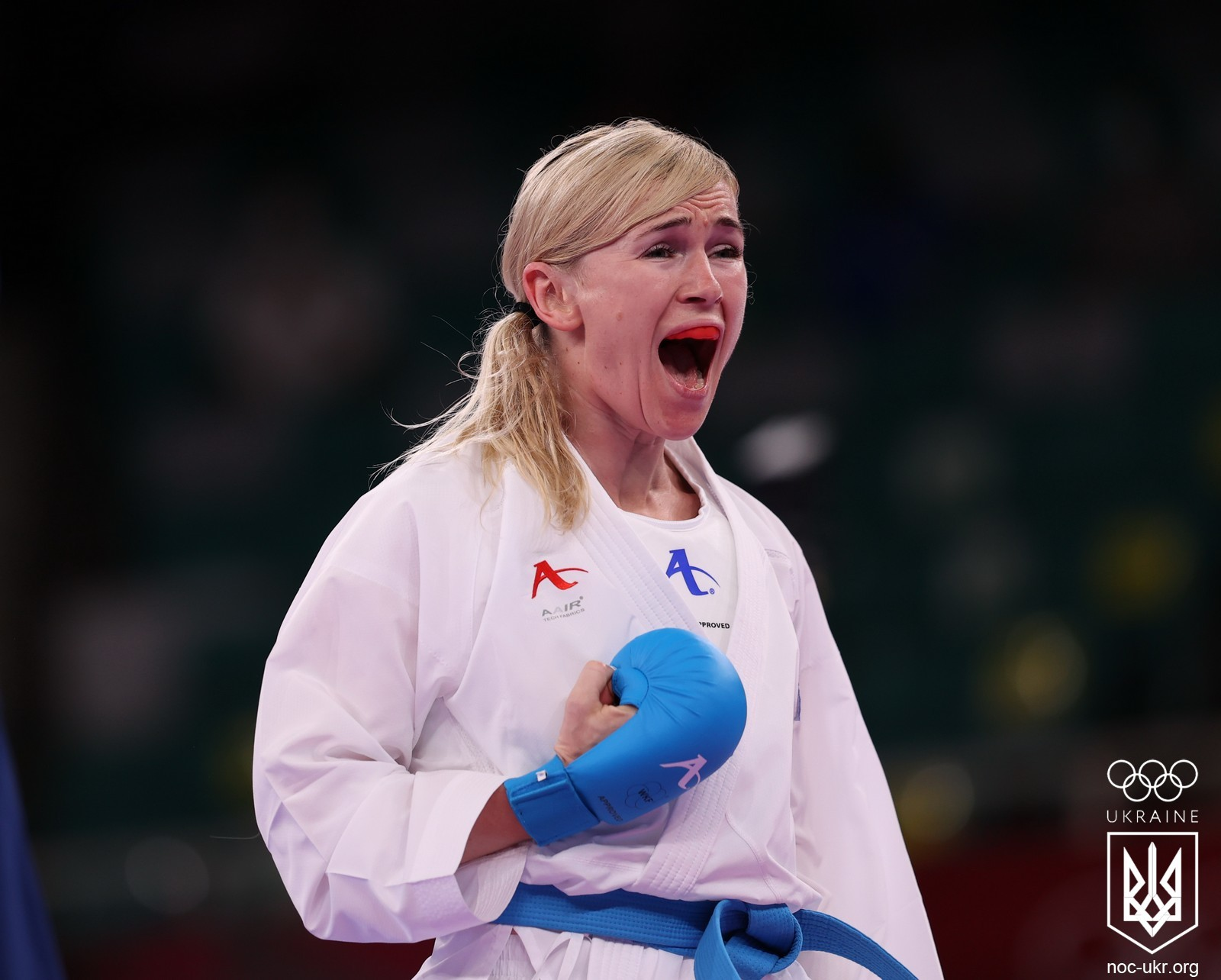
- Serogina at the 2020 Summer Olympics
- Born: Аніта Серьогіна; 16 January 1990 (age 36); Chornomorsk, Odesa Oblast, Ukrainian SSR, Soviet Union
- Nationality: Ukrainian
- Division: 61 kg
- Style: Karate Kumite

Anita Arturivna Serogina (Ukrainian: Аніта Артурівна Серьогіна, born 16 January 1990, in Chornomorsk) is a Ukrainian karateka competing in the kumite 61 kg division and coach. She started karate training at the age of eleven with the coach Tonkoshkur Olexandr (Ukrainian: Тонкошкур Олександр).

== Career ==
Serogina won the gold medal in the women's 61 kg event at the 2022 World Games held in Birmingham, United States. She is also a 2017 World Games medalist, World and European championships medalist.

Serogina won the gold medal in the women's kumite 61 kg event at the 2019 European Games held in Minsk, Belarus. In the final she defeated Tjaša Ristić of Slovenia.

In 2021, Serogina qualified at the World Olympic Qualification Tournament held in Paris, France to compete at the 2020 Summer Olympics in Tokyo, Japan. She competed in the women's 61 kg event. In November 2021, she won the silver medal in the women's 61 kg event at the 2021 World Karate Championships held in Dubai, United Arab Emirates.

She won the silver medal in the women's 61 kg event at the 2023 European Karate Championships held in Guadalajara, Spain. She also won the silver medal in the women's 61 kg event at the 2023 European Games held in Poland. She competed in the women's 61 kg event at the 2023 World Karate Championships held in Budapest, Hungary.

== Achievements ==
Year	Competition	Venue	Rank	Event
2017	World Games	Wrocław, Poland	2nd	Kumite 61 kg
2018	European Championships	Novi Sad, Serbia	2nd	Kumite 61 kg
2021	World Championships	Dubai, United Arab Emirates	2nd	Kumite 61 kg
2022	World Games	Birmingham, United States	1st	Kumite 61 kg
2023	European Championships	Guadalajara, Spain	2nd	Kumite 61 kg
2023	European Games	Kraków and Małopolska, Poland	2nd	Kumite 61 kg
