= Dębowiec Sports Arena =

Polish sports facility

Coordinates: 49°47′01″N 19°01′22″E

- Dębowiec Arena
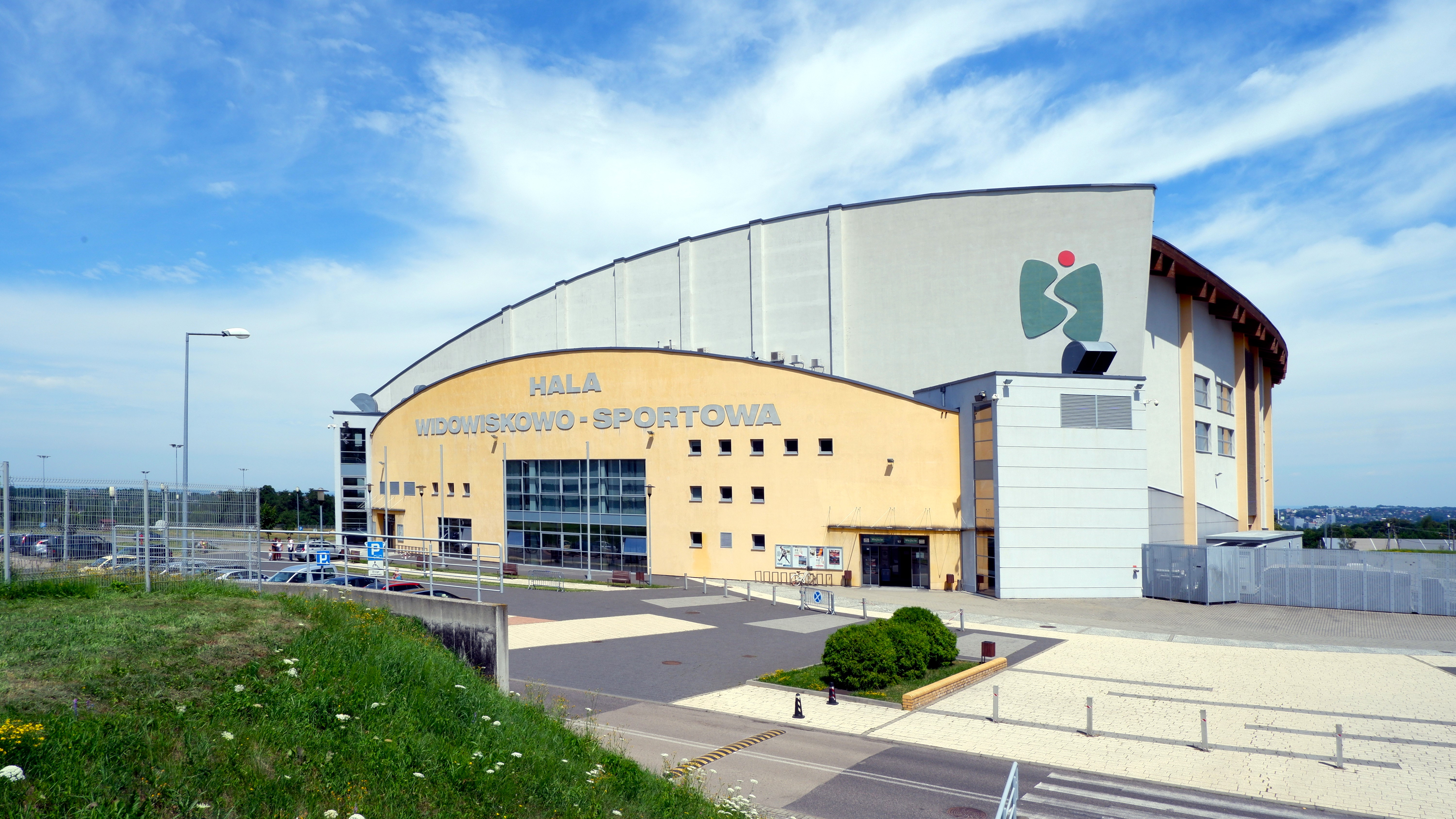
- Interactive map of Dębowiec Sports Arena
- Location: Bielsko-Biała, Poland
- Owner: BBOSiR
- Capacity: 4,500

Construction
- Groundbreaking: 2009
- Opened: 2 September 2010
- Cost: 75 million PLN
- Architect: Barbara Konieczny

Dębowiec Sports Arena (known in Poland as Hala Widowiskowo-Sportowa w Bielsku-Białej) is an indoor arena that is located in Bielsko-Biała, Poland. It is the home of the professional Polish Women's-Volleyball League club Aluprof Bielsko-Biała. The arena opened on September 2, 2010, and it has a seating capacity of 4,500.
