= Sudenur Aksoy =

Turkish karateka (born 2004)

- Born: 5 January 2004 (age 22); Istanbul, Turkey
- Nationality: Turkish
- Height: 1.75 m (5 ft 9 in)
- Weight: 68 kg (150 lb)
- Style: Karate Kumite

Sudenur Aksoy (born 2004) is a Turkish karateka competing in the kumite.

== Career ==
She won one of the bronze medals in the women's team kumite event at the 2024 European Karate Championships held in Zadar, Croatia.
