= World Cadet, Junior and U21 Karate Championships =

World Karate Championship Junior

Karate World Championships Junior
- Current event or competition: 2026 World Cadet, Junior and U21 Karate Championships

Competition details
- Discipline: Karate
- Type: Kumite and Kata, biennial
- Organiser: World Karate Federation (WKF)

Divisions
- Current weight divisions: Cadet Male -52Kg,-57Kg, -63Kg; Female -47Kg, -54Kg, 54+Kg; Junior; Male -55Kg,-61Kg, -68Kg, -76Kg and 76+Kg; Female -48Kg, -53Kg, -59Kg and 59+Kg; U21 Male -60Kg,-67Kg, -75Kg, -84Kg and 84+Kg; Female -50Kg, -55Kg, -61Kg, -68Kg and 68+Kg

History
- First edition: 1996 in Johannesburg, South Africa
- Editions: 14 (2026)
- Most recent: 2026 in Bielsko-Biała, Poland

The World Cadet, Junior and U21 Karate Championships, also known as World Karate Championship Junior are the highest level of competition for karate for U21 athletes organized by the World Karate Federation (WKF). Initiated in 1996 and held in Johannesburg, South Africa, the competition is held in a different city every two years.

== Age divisions ==
Cadets 14-16 / Juniors 16-18 / Espoirs 18-21 (Since 2009)

== Weight divisions ==
The weight classification in this competition is divided into three categories, which are:

	Female					Male				
Cadet	-47kg	-54kg	54+kg	-	-	-52kg	-57kg	-63kg	-	-
Junior	-48kg	-53kg	-59kg	59+kg	-	-55kg	-61kg	-68kg	-76kg	76+kg
U21	-50kg	-55kg	-61kg	-68kg	68+kg	-60kg	-67kg	-75kg	-84kg	84+kg

== Editions ==
8th WORLD CADET & JUNIOR KARATE CHAMPIONSHIPS 3rd UNDER 21 CUP - 2013

1996 Unofficial

Edition	Year	Host city	Host country	Events	Results
Cadet and Junior World Championship
0	1996	Johannesburg	South Africa		
1	1999	Sofia	Bulgaria		
2	2001	Athens	Greece		
3	2003	Marseille	France		
4	2005	Limassol	Cyprus		
5	2007	Istanbul	Turkey		
Cadet and Junior and U21 (Espoirs) World Championship
6	2009	Rabat	Morocco		
7	2011	Malacca	Malaysia		
8	2013	Guadalajara	Spain		
9	2015	Jakarta	Indonesia		
10	2017	Santa Cruz de Tenerife	Spain		
11	2019	Santiago	Chile	35	
12	2022	Konya	Turkey	35	
13	2024	Venice	Italy	35	
14	2026	Bielsko-Biała	Poland	41	

== All-time medal table ==
The following reflects the all-time medal counts as of the 2024 World Cadet, Junior and U21 Karate Championships:

Rank	Nation	Gold	Silver	Bronze	Total
1	Japan	74	18	33	125
2	Egypt	53	31	56	140
3	France	39	35	75	149
4	Turkey	39	34	48	121
5	Iran	26	13	33	72
6	Italy	22	25	54	101
7	Spain	18	26	43	87
8	Kazakhstan	8	3	13	24
9	Croatia	7	5	26	38
10	Algeria	6	4	4	14
11	Germany	5	15	29	49
12	Russia	5	10	20	35
13	Morocco	5	8	17	30
14	Greece	5	5	8	18
15	England	5	3	13	21
16	Montenegro	5	1	9	15
17	Azerbaijan	4	9	14	27
18	Saudi Arabia	4	7	5	16
19	Jordan	4	6	8	18
20	Indonesia	4	6	2	12
21	Serbia	4	4	7	15
22	Hungary	4	3	14	21
23	United States	3	7	10	20
24	Bosnia and Herzegovina	3	6	11	20
25	Ukraine	3	4	14	21
26	Brazil	2	3	9	14
27	Tunisia	2	3	7	12
28	Netherlands	2	2	12	16
29	Mexico	2	1	9	12
30	Sweden	2	1	2	5
31	Venezuela	1	8	10	19
32	Slovakia	1	7	16	24
33	Vietnam	1	6	3	10
34	Austria	1	5	10	16
35	Serbia and Montenegro	1	4	3	8
36	Belgium	1	3	9	13
37	Denmark	1	3	5	9
38	Chile	1	3	1	5
39	Kuwait	1	2	6	9
40	Poland	1	2	2	5
41	Belarus	1	1	7	9
42	Peru	1	1	6	8
43	Canada	1	1	4	6
43	Estonia	1	1	4	6
45	Senegal	1	1	3	5
46	Thailand	1	1	2	4
46	Yugoslavia	1	1	2	4
48	China	1	1	1	3
48	Luxembourg	1	1	1	3
50	Palestine	1	0	0	1
50	United Arab Emirates	1	0	0	1
52	Bulgaria	0	5	7	12
53	Latvia	0	5	0	5
54	North Macedonia	0	3	7	10
55	Czech Republic	0	3	4	7
56	Switzerland	0	3	1	4
57	Norway	0	3	0	3
58	Scotland	0	2	5	7
59	New Zealand	0	2	3	5
–	Individual Neutral Athletes	0	2	3	5
60	Portugal	0	1	7	8
61	Australia	0	1	3	4
62	Finland	0	1	1	2
62	Uzbekistan	0	1	1	2
64	Ecuador	0	1	0	1
64	Great Britain	0	1	0	1
64	Guatemala	0	1	0	1
64	Taiwan	0	1	0	1
68	Malaysia	0	0	4	4
69	Dominican Republic	0	0	3	3
70	Argentina	0	0	2	2
70	El Salvador	0	0	2	2
70	Philippines	0	0	2	2
70	Romania	0	0	2	2
74	Armenia	0	0	1	1
74	Chinese Taipei	0	0	1	1
74	Colombia	0	0	1	1
74	Georgia	0	0	1	1
74	Libya	0	0	1	1
74	Moldova	0	0	1	1
74	Qatar	0	0	1	1
74	Saar	0	0	1	1
74	Slovenia	0	0	1	1
74	South Africa	0	0	1	1
Totals (83 entries)		386	386	767	1,539
