= Karate at the 2025 World Games – Qualification =

This article details the qualifying phase for karate at the 2025 World Games. 96 quota places for the Games are entitled to the karatekas coming from their respective NOCs, based on the results at designated tournaments supervised by World Karate Federation. Each NOC could enter a maximum of eight karatekas (one in each division) of twelve event categories. The host nation China has reserved a spot in each of the events.

== Qualifying system ==
The rule that a country can only have one competitor per category prevails throughout the qualification process.

=== First qualification ===
3 Place per Category: Gold, Silver and the Bronze medal winner with the highest ranking of the 2023 World Karate Championships in Budapest.

=== Second qualification ===
3 Place per Category: Three first positions in the World Karate Federation Ranking as per 31 March 2025.

=== Third qualification ===
1 Place per Category: The person from the host country China.

=== Fourth qualification ===
1 Place per Category: The remaining total of 12 places are distributed by continental federation.

== Qualification summary ==
The following table summarises the outcome of qualification for the Karate at the 2022 World Games. Following athletes gained at least one quota place for Chengdu.

NOC	Men						Women						Total
NOC	Kata	60 kg	67 kg	75 kg	-84 kg	+84	Kata	50 kg	55 kg	61 kg	68 kg	+68	Total
Azerbaijan											Yes		1
Bulgaria									Yes				1
China	Yes	Yes	Yes	Yes	Yes	Yes	Yes	Yes	Yes	Yes	Yes	Yes	12
Egypt				Yes	Yes	Yes				Yes		Yes	5
France			Yes			Yes							2
Greece		Yes											1
Hong Kong							Yes						1
Hungary				Yes									1
Indonesia											Yes		1
Iran					Yes								1
Italy		Yes					Yes	Yes					3
Japan	Yes						Yes					Yes	3
Jordan					Yes								1
Kazakhstan		Yes	Yes					Yes					3
Montenegro			Yes										1
Serbia						Yes							1
Spain	Yes											Yes	2
Switzerland											Yes		1
Turkey	Yes								Yes	Yes			3
Ukraine				Yes					Yes				2
Venezuela								Yes					1
Total: 21 NOCs	4	4	4	4	4	4	4	4	4	3	4	4	47

== Men's events ==
=== Kata ===
Qualification method	Places	Rank	NOC	Qualified karateka
Host nation	1	—	China	Kangwey Yang
2023 World Karate Championships	4	1st place, gold medalist(s)	~~Turkey~~	~~Ali Sofuoğlu~~ (Note: Originally, Ali Sofuoğlu qualified as the gold medalist in the discipline at the 2023 World Karate Championships, but in April 2025, he received a two-year suspension for anti-doping violations.)
2023 World Karate Championships	4	2nd place, silver medalist(s)	Spain	Damián Quintero
2023 World Karate Championships	4	3rd place, bronze medalist(s)	Japan	Kakeru Nishiyama
2023 World Karate Championships	4	3rd place, bronze medalist(s)	United States	Ariel Torres
Karate Ranking	3	1	Italy	Alessio Ghinami
Karate Ranking	3	2	Sweden	Anthony Vu
Karate Ranking	3	3	Slovakia	Roman Hrčka
Continental representative	1	—	Egypt	Adam Ellithy

=== Kumite -60 kg ===
Qualification method	Places	Rank	NOC	Qualified karateka
Host nation	1	—	China	Leilei Shi
2023 World Karate Championships	3	1st place, gold medalist(s)	Greece	Christos-Stefanos Xenos
2023 World Karate Championships	3	2nd place, silver medalist(s)	Kazakhstan	Kaisar Alpysbay
2023 World Karate Championships	3	3rd place, bronze medalist(s)	Italy	Angelo Crescenzo
Karate Ranking	3	1	Japan	Hiromu Hashimoto
Karate Ranking	3	2	Turkey	Eray Şamdan
Karate Ranking	3	3	Kuwait	Abdullah Shaaban
Continental representative	1	—	Morocco	Abdel Ali Jina

=== Kumite -67 kg ===
Qualification method	Places	Rank	NOC	Qualified karateka
Host nation	1	—	China	Weicheng Wang
2023 World Karate Championships	3	1st place, gold medalist(s)	France	Steven Da Costa (Note: Despite winning gold metal in the 2023 World Karate Championships, Da Costa does not appear in the list of qualified karatekas at the games' official website.)
2023 World Karate Championships	3	2nd place, silver medalist(s)	Montenegro	Nenad Dulović
2023 World Karate Championships	3	3rd place, bronze medalist(s)	Kazakhstan	Didar Amirali
2023 World Karate Championships	3	3rd place, bronze medalist(s)	Saudi Arabia	Fahad Al-Khathami
Karate Ranking	3	1	Japan	Yugo Kozaki
Karate Ranking	3	2	Brazil	Vinicius Figueira
Karate Ranking	3	3	Jordan	Abdelrahman Al-Masatfa
Continental representative	1	—	Morocco	Said Oubaya

=== Kumite -75 kg ===
Qualification method	Places	Rank	NOC	Qualified karateka
Host nation	1	—	China	Junbo Xu
2023 World Karate Championships	3	1st place, gold medalist(s)	Egypt	Abdalla Abdelaziz
2023 World Karate Championships	3	2nd place, silver medalist(s)	Hungary	Gábor Hárspataki
2023 World Karate Championships	3	3rd place, bronze medalist(s)	Ukraine	Andrii Zaplitnyi
Karate Ranking	3	1	France	Enzo Berthon
Karate Ranking	3	2	Kazakhstan	Nurkanat Azhikanov
Karate Ranking	3	3	Japan	Yusei Sakiyama
Continental representative	1	—	Australia	Mitchell Durham

=== Kumite -84 kg ===
Qualification method	Places	Rank	NOC	Qualified karateka
Host nation	1	—	China	Peiqi Duan
2023 World Karate Championships	3	1st place, gold medalist(s)	Egypt	Youssef Badawy
2023 World Karate Championships	3	2nd place, silver medalist(s)	Iran	Mehdi Khodabakhshi (Note: Despite winning silver metal in the 2023 World Karate Championships, Khodabakhshi does not appear in the list of qualified karatekas at the games' official website.)
2023 World Karate Championships	3	3rd place, bronze medalist(s)	Jordan	Mohammad Al-Jafari
2023 World Karate Championships	3	3rd place, bronze medalist(s)	Ukraine	Valerii Chobotar
Karate Ranking	3	1	Japan	Rikito Shimada
Karate Ranking	3	2	Greece	Konstantinos Mastrogiannis
Karate Ranking	3	3	Croatia	Ivan Kvesić
Continental representative	1	—	Netherlands	Brian Timmermans

=== Kumite +84 kg ===
Qualification method	Places	Rank	NOC	Qualified karateka
Host nation	1	—	China	Ang Zhai
2023 World Karate Championships	3	1st place, gold medalist(s)	France	Mehdi Filali
2023 World Karate Championships	3	2nd place, silver medalist(s)	Egypt	Taha Mahmoud
2023 World Karate Championships	3	3rd place, bronze medalist(s)	Iran	Sajad Ganjzadeh
Karate Ranking	3	1	Ukraine	Ryzvan Talibov
Karate Ranking	3	2	Croatia	Anđelo Kvesić
Karate Ranking	3	3	Aruba	Rob Timmermans
Continental representative	1	—	United States	Eduard Sagilyan

== Women's events ==
=== Kata ===
Qualification method	Places	Rank	NOC	Qualified karateka
Host nation	1	—	China	Yiwei Tao
2023 World Karate Championships	3	1st place, gold medalist(s)	Japan	Hikaru Ono
2023 World Karate Championships	3	2nd place, silver medalist(s)	Hong Kong	Grace Lau
2023 World Karate Championships	3	3rd place, bronze medalist(s)	Italy	Terryana D'Onofrio
Karate Ranking	3	1	United States	Sakura Kokumai
Karate Ranking	3	2	Iran	Fatemeh Sadeghi
Karate Ranking	3	3	Spain	Paola García
Continental representative	1	—	Colombia	Valentina Zapata

=== Kumite -50 kg ===
Qualification method	Places	Rank	NOC	Qualified karateka
Host nation	1	—	China	Junhui Wang
2023 World Karate Championships	3	1st place, gold medalist(s)	Kazakhstan	Moldir Zhangbyrbay
2023 World Karate Championships	3	2nd place, silver medalist(s)	Italy	Erminia Perfetto
2023 World Karate Championships	3	3rd place, bronze medalist(s)	Venezuela	Yorgelis Salazar
Karate Ranking	3	1	Croatia	Ema Sgardelli
Karate Ranking	3	2	Iran	Sara Bahmanyar
Karate Ranking	3	3	Canada	Yamina Lahyanssa
Continental representative	1	—	Algeria	Cylia Ouikene

=== Kumite -55 kg ===
Qualification method	Places	Rank	NOC	Qualified karateka
Host nation	1	—	China	Yuchun Wei
2023 World Karate Championships	3	1st place, gold medalist(s)	Turkey	Tuba Yakan
2023 World Karate Championships	3	2nd place, silver medalist(s)	Bulgaria	Ivet Goranova
2023 World Karate Championships	3	3rd place, bronze medalist(s)	Ukraine	Anzhelika Terliuga
Karate Ranking	3	1	Chile	Valentina Toro
Karate Ranking	3	2	Germany	Mia Bitsch
Karate Ranking	3	3	Canada	Hana Furumoto-Deshaies
Continental representative	1	—	Japan	Rina Kodo

=== Kumite -61 kg ===
Qualification method	Places	Rank	NOC	Qualified karateka
Host nation	1	—	—N/a	—N/a
2023 World Karate Championships	4	1st place, gold medalist(s)	China	Gong Li
2023 World Karate Championships	4	2nd place, silver medalist(s)	Turkey	Fatma Naz Yenen
2023 World Karate Championships	4	3rd place, bronze medalist(s)	Egypt	Noursin Aly
2023 World Karate Championships	4	3rd place, bronze medalist(s)	France	Laura Sivert
Karate Ranking	3	1	Kazakhstan	Assel Kanay
Karate Ranking	3	2	Germany	Reem Khamis
Karate Ranking	3	3	Japan	Sarara Shimada
Continental representative	1	—	Tunisia	Wafa Mahjoub

=== Kumite -68 kg ===
Qualification method	Places	Rank	NOC	Qualified karateka
Host nation	1	—	China	Qiaoqiao Li
2023 World Karate Championships	3	1st place, gold medalist(s)	Azerbaijan	Irina Zaretska
2023 World Karate Championships	3	2nd place, silver medalist(s)	Switzerland	Elena Quirici
2023 World Karate Championships	3	3rd place, bronze medalist(s)	Indonesia	Ceyco Georgia Zefanya
Karate Ranking	3	1	Japan	Tsubasa Kama
Karate Ranking	3	2	France	Thalya Sombe
Karate Ranking	3	3	Turkey	Eda Eltemur
Continental representative	1	—	Egypt	Hadir Hendy

=== Kumite +68 kg ===
Qualification method	Places	Rank	NOC	Qualified karateka
Host nation	1	—	China	Qiqi Xu
2023 World Karate Championships	3	1st place, gold medalist(s)	Japan	Ayaka Saito (Note: Despite winning gold metal in the 2023 World Karate Championships, Saito does not appear in the list of qualified karatekas at the games' official website.)
2023 World Karate Championships	3	2nd place, silver medalist(s)	Spain	María Torres
2023 World Karate Championships	3	3rd place, bronze medalist(s)	Egypt	Menna Shaaban Okila
2023 World Karate Championships	3	3rd place, bronze medalist(s)	Italy	Clio Ferracuti
Karate Ranking	3	1	Kazakhstan	Sofya Berultseva
Karate Ranking	3	2	Germany	Johanna Kneer
Karate Ranking	3	3	France	Nancy Garcia
Continental representative	1	—	Australia	Hannah Sullivan
