= Karate at the 2025 World Games – Women's kumite 61 kg =

Women's kumite 61 kg at the 2025 World Games
- Venue: Jianyang Cultural and Sports Centre Gymnasium
- Location: Chengdu, China
- Dates: 9 August
- Competitors: 8 from 8 nations

Medalists
gold medal	Gong Li	China
silver medal	Sarara Shimada	Japan
bronze medal	Noursin Ali	Egypt

The women's kumite 61 kg competition in karate at the 2025 World Games took place on 9 August 2025 at the Jianyang Cultural and Sports Centre Gymnasium in Chengdu, China.

== Results ==
=== Pool round ===
==== Pool A ====
Pos	Athlete	B	W	D	D^{0}	L	Pts	Score	(China)	(Japan)	(Tunisia)	(Turkey)
1	Gong Li (CHN)	3	3	0	0	0	9	18–5	—	2–1	10–1	6–3
2	Sarara Shimada (JPN)	3	2	0	0	1	6	13–8	1–2	—	8–5	4–1
3	Wafa Mahjoub (TUN)	3	1	0	0	2	3	9–18	1–10	5–8	—	3–0
4	Fatma Naz Yenen (TUR)	3	0	0	0	3	0	4–13	3–6	1–4	0–3	—

Source: Chengdu 2025

==== Pool B ====
Pos	Athlete	B	W	D	D^{0}	L	Pts	Score	(Iran)	(Egypt)	(Kazakhstan)	(France)
1	Atousa Golshadnejad (IRI)	3	3	0	0	0	9	8–3	—	2–1	3–2	3–0
2	Noursin Ali (EGY)	3	2	0	0	1	6	6–5	1–2	—	3–3	2–0
3	Assel Kanay (KAZ)	3	0	0	1	2	0 (Note: Kanay (KAZ) 0–0 Sivert (FRA). Scores obtained: Kanay 5, Sivert 0.)	5–6	2–3	3–3	—	0–0
4	Laura Sivert (FRA)	3	0	0	1	2	0	0–5	0–3	0–2	0–0	—

Source: Chengdu 2025

=== Finals ===
Semi-finals
Noursin Ali (EGY)	0
Gong Li (CHN)	4
Sarara Shimada (JPN)	2
Atousa Golshadnejad (IRI)	1

Gold medal bout
Gong Li (CHN)	5
Sarara Shimada (JPN)	1
Bronze medal bout
Noursin Ali (EGY)	5
Atousa Golshadnejad (IRI)	0
