= Pakistan women's national karate team =

The Pakistan women's national karate team represents Pakistan in international karate competitions. It is administered by the Pakistan Karate Federation (PKF). Members of the team compete at competitions including the continental and regional games (Asian and South Asian Games). At the Asian Games held in Jakarta, Indonesia in 2018, Nargis Hameedullah became the first Pakistani woman to win an individual medal (a bronze) at the Asian Games.

== Events ==
Pakistan has sent a team to participate in the following events:

1. Asian (AKF) Championships: 2012
2. Asian Games: 2018
3. South Asian Games: 2006, 2010, 2019

== History ==
In 2012, a two-member team participated in its first ever Asian (AKF) Championships which were held in Tashkent, Uzbekistan.

== Team Members ==
Current Members
Name	Competitions	Event	Medals
Kulsoom Hazara	Asian Championships: 2012 South Asian Games: 2019		
Nargis Hameedullah	Asian Games: 2018; South Asian Games: 2019	- Kumite (team), kata (team), 68+kg	Bronze Gold (kumite), and 2 x silver (kata and 68+)
Shahida Abbasi	South Asian Games: 2019	Kata (individual and team), Kumite (team),	2 x Gold (individual kata and team kumite) and silver (kata team)

Current Members
Name	Competitions	Event	Medal
Gulsoom	South Asian Games: 2010	under 61 kg, kata (team)	2 x Bronze
Hina Azeem	South Asian Games: 2006	Individual (Kumite) 53 kg	Bronze
Rahila Shaheen	South Asian Games: 2006	Individual (Kumite) 53 kg	Bronze
Sarah Nasir	South Asian Games: 2010	under 55 kg, Kata (team)	Gold Kata: Bronze
Sohaila	South Asian Games: 2010	Kata (team)	Bronze
Zohrah	South Asian Games: 2010	under 45 kg, Kata (individual and team)	3 x Bronze,

== Medals ==
South Asian Games
Games	Gold	Silver	Bronze	Total
(Sri Lanka) Colombo (2006)				
(Bangladesh) Dhaka (2010)				
(India) Guwahati (2016)				
(Nepal) Kathmandu (2019)	2	4	3	9
Total				
