= 2025 World Karate Championships – Women's 61 kg =

Women's kumite 61 kg at the 2025 World Karate Championships
- Venue: Cairo Stadium Indoor Halls Complex
- Location: Cairo, Egypt
- Dates: 28–30 November
- Competitors: 32

Medalists
gold medal	Atousa Golshadnejad	Iran
silver medal	Gong Li	China
bronze medal	Assel Kanay	Kazakhstan
bronze medal	Wafa Mahjoub	Tunisia

The women's kumite 61 kg competition at the 2025 World Karate Championships was held from 28 to 30 November 2025.

== Results ==
=== Group phase ===
==== Group A ====
Pos	Athlete	B	W	D	D^{0}	L	Pts	Score	(Egypt)	(Netherlands)	(Italy)	(Colombia)
1	Noursin Aly (EGY)	3	3	0	0	0	9	11–6	—	1–0	6–6	4–0
2	Ashley Kakiay (NED)	3	2	0	0	1	6	4–4	0–1	—	3–3	1–0
3	Aurora Graziosi (ITA)	3	1	0	0	2	3	11–10	6–6	3–3	—	2–1
4	Natalia Bernal (COL)	3	0	0	0	3	0	1–7	0–4	0–1	1–2	—

==== Group B ====
Pos	Athlete	B	W	D	D^{0}	L	Pts	Score	(China)	(Bosnia and Herzegovina)	(Brazil)	(France)
1	Gong Li (CHN)	3	2	0	1	0	6 (Note: Gong (CHN) 1–0 Sipović (BIH))	5–0	—	1–0	4–0	0–0
2	Emina Sipović (BIH)	3	2	0	0	1	6	13–5	0–1	—	4–3	9–1
3	Bárbara Rodrigues (BRA) [3]	3	1	0	0	2	3	5–8	0–4	3–4	—	2–0
4	Sydney Yvon (FRA)	3	0	0	1	2	0	1–11	0–0	1–9	0–2	—

==== Group C ====
Pos	Athlete	B	W	D	D^{0}	L	Pts	Score	(Turkey)	(Chile)	(Sweden)	(Algeria)
1	Fatma Naz Yenen (TUR)	3	3	0	0	0	9	10–5	—	6–5	2–0	2–0
2	Bárbara Huaiquiman (CHI)	3	1	0	0	2	3 (Note: Huaiquiman (CHI) 1–1, Nilsson (SWE) 1–1, Ghelam (ALG) 1–1. Scores obtained: Huaiquiman 12, Nilsson 6, Ghelam 2. Nilsson 6–0 Ghelam.)	12–8	5–6	—	6–0	1–2
3	Anna-Johanna Nilsson (SWE)	3	1	0	0	2	3	6–8	0–2	0–6	—	6–0
4	Khadidja Ghelam (ALG)	3	1	0	0	2	3	2–9	0–2	2–1	0–6	—

==== Group D ====
Pos	Athlete	B	W	D	D^{0}	L	Pts	Score	(Ukraine)		(Poland)	(Nigeria)
1	Oleksandra Sholohova (UKR) [2]	3	2	0	1	0	6 (Note: Sholohova (UKR) 0–0 Azarava (WKF). Scores obtained: Sholohova 11, Azarava 7.)	11–2	—	0–0	2–1	9–1
2	Maryia Azarava (WKF-2)	3	2	0	1	0	6	7–0	0–0	—	1–0	6–0
3	Katarzyna Lewandowska (POL)	3	1	0	0	2	3	3–3	1–2	0–1	—	2–0
4	Constance Abode (NGR)	3	0	0	0	3	0	1–17	1–9	0–6	0–2	—

==== Group E ====
Pos	Athlete	B	W	D	D^{0}	L	Pts	Score	(Australia)	(Malaysia)	(Austria)	(Germany)
1	Iris Webb (AUS)	3	3	0	0	0	9	9–2	—	1–0	4–1	4–1
2	Zakiah Adnan (MAS)	3	2	0	0	1	6	7–6	0–1	—	4–4	3–1
3	Lejla Topalovic (AUT)	3	1	0	0	2	3	7–8	1–4	4–4	—	2–0
4	Reem Khamis (GER)	3	0	0	0	3	0	2–9	1–4	1–3	0–2	—

==== Group F ====
Pos	Athlete	B	W	D	D^{0}	L	Pts	Score	(Iran)	(Uzbekistan)	(Cameroon)	(Latvia)
1	Atousa Golshadnejad (IRI) [4]	3	2	0	1	0	6 (Note: Golshadnejad (IRI) 2–1 Otaboyeva (UZB))	10–1	—	2–1	8–0	0–0
2	Sevinch Otaboyeva (UZB)	3	2	0	0	1	6	9–6	1–2	—	2–1	6–3
3	Dzeu Nelly (CMR)	3	1	0	0	2	3	6–12	0–8	1–2	—	5–2
4	Beata Girvica (LAT)	3	0	0	1	2	0	5–11	0–0	3–6	2–5	—

==== Group G ====
Pos	Athlete	B	W	D	D^{0}	L	Pts	Score	(Japan)	(Belgium)	(Romania)	(Ecuador)
1	Sarara Shimada (JPN)	3	3	0	0	0	9	10–2	—	4–2	2–0	4–0
2	Maryam Ajaray (BEL)	3	2	0	0	1	6	11–5	2–4	—	2–1	7–0
3	Miruna Mălăuță (ROU)	3	1	0	0	2	3	3–6	0–2	1–2	—	2–2
4	Jacqueline Factos (ECU)	3	0	0	0	3	0	2–13	0–4	0–7	2–2	—

==== Group H ====
Pos	Athlete	B	W	D	D^{0}	L	Pts	Score	(Tunisia)	(Kazakhstan)	(Switzerland)	(India)
1	Wafa Mahjoub (TUN)	3	3	0	0	0	9	15–1	—	2–1	4–0	9–0
2	Assel Kanay (KAZ) [1]	3	2	0	0	1	6	12–3	1–2	—	3–1	8–0
3	Nina Radjenovic (SUI)	3	1	0	0	2	3	6–10	0–4	1–3	—	5–3
4	Hanee Ali (IND)	3	0	0	0	3	0	3–22	0–9	0–8	3–5	—

=== Elimination phase ===
Round of 16; 28 November
Assel Kanay (KAZ)	5
Noursin Aly (EGY)	2
Maryam Ajaray (BEL)	0
Gong Li (CHN)	0
Sevinch Otaboyeva (UZB)	6
Fatma Naz Yenen (TUR)	2
Zakiah Adnan (MAS)	0
Oleksandra Sholohova (UKR)	4
Maryia Azarava (WKF-2)	6
Iris Webb (AUS)	4
Bárbara Huaiquiman (CHI)	0
Atousa Golshadnejad (IRI)	0
Emina Sipović (BIH)	8
Sarara Shimada (JPN)	9
Ashley Kakiay (NED)	1
Wafa Mahjoub (TUN)	2

Quarterfinals; 29 November
Assel Kanay (KAZ)	1
Gong Li (CHN)	1
Sevinch Otaboyeva (UZB)	2
Oleksandra Sholohova (UKR)	4
Maryia Azarava (WKF-2)	0
Atousa Golshadnejad (IRI)	5
Sarara Shimada (JPN)	2
Wafa Mahjoub (TUN)	6

Semifinals; 29 November
Gong Li (CHN)	5
Oleksandra Sholohova (UKR)	0
Atousa Golshadnejad (IRI)	4
Wafa Mahjoub (TUN)	1

Final; 30 November
Gong Li (CHN)	2
Atousa Golshadnejad (IRI)	4

Bronze medals 30 November
Assel Kanay (KAZ)	3
Oleksandra Sholohova (UKR)	2
Maryia Azarava (WKF-2)	6
Wafa Mahjoub (TUN)	7
