= 2023 World Karate Championships – Women's 61 kg =

Women's kumite 61 kg at the 2023 World Karate Championships
- Venue: László Papp Budapest Sports Arena
- Location: Budapest, Hungary
- Dates: 25, 28 October
- Competitors: 68 from 68 nations

Medalists
| gold medal | Gong Li | China |
| silver medal | Fatma Naz Yenen | Turkey |
| bronze medal | Laura Sivert | France |
| bronze medal | Noursin Aly | Egypt |

The women's kumite 61 kg competition at the 2023 World Karate Championships was held on 25 and 28 October 2023.

== Results ==
=== Finals ===
Semifinals
(France) Laura Sivert | 0
(China) Gong Li | 1
(Turkey) Fatma Naz Yenen | 9
(Egypt) Noursin Aly | 5

Final
(China) Gong Li | 6
(Turkey) Fatma Naz Yenen | 1

=== Repechage ===
Repechage 1
(Argentina) Laura Díaz | 1
(Japan) Maya Suzuki | 5

Repechage 2
(Japan) Maya Suzuki | 0
(Ukraine) Anita Serogina | 3

Repechage 3
(Ukraine) Anita Serogina | 2
(Vietnam) Hoàng Thị Mỹ Tâm | 4

Bronze medal
(Vietnam) Hoàng Thị Mỹ Tâm | 0
(France) Laura Sivert | 0

Repechage 1
(Canada) Haya Jumaa | 2
(Belgium) Maryam Ajaray | 0

Repechage 2
(Canada) Haya Jumaa | 4
(Algeria) Chaima Midi | 3

Repechage 3
(Canada) Haya Jumaa | 0
(Tunisia) Wafa Mahjoub | 5

Bronze medal
(Tunisia) Wafa Mahjoub | 2
(Egypt) Noursin Aly | 6

=== Top half ===
==== Section 1 ====
First round
(North Macedonia) Veronika Kostovska | 3
(Brazil) Isadora Fernandes | 2

Second round
(North Macedonia) Veronika Kostovska | 1
(Peru) Alexandra Grande | 2
(Latvia) Aleksandra Davidova | 2
(Saudi Arabia) Najla Al-Otaibi | 0
(Slovakia) Hana Kuklová | 2
(Kenya) Esther Katunge | 0
(Chile) Valentina Vega | 2
(Ecuador) Jacqueline Factos | 6
(Hong Kong) Chow Hei Wood | 0
(France) Laura Sivert | 6
(Cyprus) Anthea Stylianou | 2
(Scotland) Carly McNab | 7
(Hungary) Aleksandra Ilankovic | 2
Maryia Azarava | 1
(Thailand) Penpisut Namkhao | 1
(Kazakhstan) Assel Kanay | 3

Third round
(Peru) Alexandra Grande | 4
(Latvia) Aleksandra Davidova | 1
(Slovakia) Hana Kuklová | 4
(Ecuador) Jacqueline Factos | 5
(France) Laura Sivert | 7
(Scotland) Carly McNab | 0
(Hungary) Aleksandra Ilankovic | 3
(Kazakhstan) Assel Kanay | 2

Fourth round
(Peru) Alexandra Grande | 5
(Ecuador) Jacqueline Factos | 1
(France) Laura Sivert | 2
(Hungary) Aleksandra Ilankovic | 1

Quarterfinals
(Peru) Alexandra Grande | 0
(France) Laura Sivert | 1

==== Section 2 ====
First round
(Venezuela) Claudymar Garcés | 0
(Greece) Konstantina Chrysopoulou | 2

Second round
(Greece) Konstantina Chrysopoulou | 1
(South Africa) Danielle van Wyk | 2
(Netherlands) Lynn Snel
(Iran) Atousa Golshadnezhad | w/o
(India) Deepika Dhiman | 0
(Vietnam) Hoàng Thị Mỹ Tâm | 7
(Norway) Mia Rognhaug Hagen | 0
(Morocco) Fatima-Zahra Chajai | 0
(Jordan) Nourallah Naser | 9
(Japan) Maya Suzuki | 9
(China) Gong Li | 6
(Argentina) Laura Díaz | 0
(Kosovo) Njomza Ibrahimi | 0
(Sweden) Anna-Johanna Nilsson | 2
(United States) Ellora Jaggi | 0
(Ukraine) Anita Serogina | 4

Third round
(South Africa) Danielle van Wyk | 1
(Iran) Atousa Golshadnezhad | 2
(Vietnam) Hoàng Thị Mỹ Tâm | 6
(Morocco) Fatima-Zahra Chajai | 2
(Japan) Maya Suzuki | 2
(China) Gong Li | 8
(Sweden) Anna-Johanna Nilsson | 1
(Ukraine) Anita Serogina | 2

Fourth round
(Iran) Atousa Golshadnezhad | 0
(Vietnam) Hoàng Thị Mỹ Tâm | 1
(China) Gong Li | 3
(Ukraine) Anita Serogina | 1

Quarterfinals
(Vietnam) Hoàng Thị Mỹ Tâm | 3
(China) Gong Li | 6

=== Bottom half ===
==== Section 3 ====
First round
(Italy) Alessandra Mangiacapra | 4
(Finland) Kiia Koponen | 0

Second round
(Italy) Alessandra Mangiacapra | 10
(Montenegro) Ksenija Rajović | 0
(Algeria) Chaima Midi | 11
(Colombia) Natalia Bernal | 5
(Curaçao) Joanna Horsmans | 3
(Belgium) Maryam Ajaray | 11
(Turkey) Fatma Naz Yenen | 1
(Canada) Haya Jumaa | 0
(Uzbekistan) Zulkhumor Tursunalieva | 8
(Romania) Miruna Mălăuţă | 3
(Austria) Lejla Topalovic | 0
(Spain) Carlota Fernández | 2
(Australia) Kristina Mah | 1
(Slovenia) Hana Debeljak | 4
(Philippines) Jamie Lim | 0
(Tunisia) Wafa Mahjoub | 5

Third round
(Italy) Alessandra Mangiacapra | 2
(Algeria) Chaima Midi | 5
(Belgium) Maryam Ajaray | 2
(Turkey) Fatma Naz Yenen | 2
(Uzbekistan) Zulkhumor Tursunalieva | 3
(Spain) Carlota Fernández | 9
(Slovenia) Hana Debeljak | 2
(Tunisia) Wafa Mahjoub | 4

Fourth round
(Algeria) Chaima Midi | 3
(Turkey) Fatma Naz Yenen | 8
(Spain) Carlota Fernández | 2
(Tunisia) Wafa Mahjoub | 4

Quarterfinals
(Turkey) Fatma Naz Yenen | 8
(Tunisia) Wafa Mahjoub | 6

==== Section 4 ====
First round
(Denmark) Trine Fuyu Lind | 5
(Chinese Taipei) Huang Yu-ru | 1

Second round
(Denmark) Trine Fuyu Lind | 8
(Chad) Victorine Koro | 0
(England) Jasmine Pomeroy | w/o
(Serbia) Nevena Filipov
(South Korea) Chae Min-yeong | 0
(United Arab Emirates) Sarah Al-Ameri | 2
(Poland) Weronika Mikulska | 1
(Switzerland) Nina Radjenovic | 4
(Bosnia and Herzegovina) Emina Sipović | 7
(Azerbaijan) Renata Arabli | 1
(Egypt) Noursin Aly | 7
(Malaysia) Zakiah Adnan | 6
(Portugal) Renata Baptista | 3
(Croatia) Laura Lisac | 1
Anastasiya Chupina | 3
(Germany) Reem Khamis | 2

Third round
(Denmark) Trine Fuyu Lind | 7
(England) Jasmine Pomeroy | 2
(United Arab Emirates) Sarah Al-Ameri | 6
(Switzerland) Nina Radjenovic | 5
(Bosnia and Herzegovina) Emina Sipović | 4
(Egypt) Noursin Aly | 7
(Portugal) Renata Baptista | 0
Anastasiya Chupina | 0

Fourth round
(Denmark) Trine Fuyu Lind | 4
(United Arab Emirates) Sarah Al-Ameri | 6
(Egypt) Noursin Aly | 5
Anastasiya Chupina | 5

Quarterfinals
(United Arab Emirates) Sarah Al-Ameri | 5
(Egypt) Noursin Aly | 5
