= Shahida Abbasi =

Pakistani karateka

Personal information
- Nationality: Pakistani

Sport
- Sport: Karate
Medal record
Representing Pakistan
South Asian Karate Championships
Bronze medal – third place	2016 New Delhi	Kata (individual)
Bronze medal – third place	2016 New Delhi	Kata (team)
Bronze medal – third place	2016 New Delhi	Kumite (-45kg)
Bronze medal – third place	2017 Colombo	Kata (individual)
Bronze medal – third place	2017 Colombo	Kata (team)
Bronze medal – third place	2017 Colombo	Kumite (-45kg)
Bronze medal – third place	2017 Colombo	Kumite (team)
South Asian Games
Gold medal – first place	2019 Kathmandu	Kata (individual)
Gold medal – first place	2019 Kathmandu	Kumite (team)
Silver medal – second place	2019 Kathmandu	Kata (team)

Shahida Abbasi (born c. 1995) is a Pakistani karateka. She is the first Pakistani woman to compete internationally in kata.

== Background ==
Abbasi belongs to the Hazara community of Quetta, Balochistan. She is the second of four daughters.

== Career ==
Coached by Muhammad Shah, Abbasi started learning karate in 2004. She is also learning the martial art of Sholokan and teaching karate in her hometown. Her sensei is Ghulam Ali.

=== National ===
Abbasi initially represented her home province, Balochistan and now represents WAPDA in national competitions. While representing Balochistan at the 31st National Games held in Peshawar in 2010, she won a silver medal alongside her teammates: Naz and Zahara in team kata. At the 13th National Karate Championships held at the Nishtar Park Sports Complex Gymnasium Hall in Lahore, Abbasi won gold in individual kata, and the National Games held in Peshawar in November 2019, Abbasi won 2 gold medals, in individual kata and in team (3 persons) kata.

=== International ===
At the 3rd South Asian Karate Championships held in New Delhi, India in 2016, Abbasi won three bronze medals: kata (individual and team) and kumite (-45 kg) individual event. In 2017, at the 4th South Asian Karate Championships held in Colombo, Sri Lanka, Abbasi won four bronze medals: kata (individual and team) and kumite (-45 kg and team). Abbasi also participated in the Islamic Solidarity Games held in Baku, Azerbaijan. At the South Asian Games held in Kathmandu, Nepal in December 2019, Abbasi won the gold medal in the individual kata event with 42 points, which was the country's first gold medal at these Games. She also claimed another gold in the women's team kumite alongside her teammates: Kulsoom Hazara, Sana Kausar, Nargis Hameedullah, Sabira Gul. In the women's team kata event, she won silver alongside Nargis Hameedullah and Naz Gul.
