= Slovakia at the 2017 World Games =

- IOC code: SVK

in Wrocław, Poland 20 July 2017 – 30 July 2017
- Medals Ranked 57th: Gold 0 Silver 0 Bronze 1 Total 1

World Games appearances (overview)
- 1981; 1985; 1989; 1993; 1997; 2001; 2005; 2009; 2013; 2017; 2022; 2025

Slovakia competed at the 2017 World Games held in Wrocław, Poland.

== Medalists ==
Medal	Name	Sport	Event
Bronze	Ingrida Suchánková	Karate	Women's kumite 61 kg

== Dancesport ==
Lubomir Mick and Adriana Dindofferova competed in the Standard competition.

Filip Kočiš and Andrea Hrušková competed in the Rock'n'Roll competition.

== Karate ==
Ingrida Suchánková won the bronze medal in the women's kumite 61 kg event.

Dominika Tatarova competed in the women's kumite +68 kg event without advancing to the semi-finals.
