= Chaima Midi =

Algerian karateka (born 1996)

Personal information
- Born: 1 February 1996 (age 30)

Sport
- Country: Algeria
- Sport: Karate
- Weight class: 61 kg
- Events: Kumite; Team kumite
Medal record
Women's karate
Representing Algeria
African Games
Gold medal – first place	2019 Rabat	Kumite 61 kg
Bronze medal – third place	2019 Rabat	Team kumite
Bronze medal – third place	2023 Accra	Kumite 61 kg
Mediterranean Games
Gold medal – first place	2022 Oran	Kumite 61 kg
African Championships
Gold medal – first place	2018 Kigali	Team kumite
Silver medal – second place	2021 Cairo	Team kumite
Silver medal – second place	2019 Gaborone	Kumite 61 kg
Bronze medal – third place	2021 Cairo	Kumite 61 kg
Bronze medal – third place	2020 Tangier	Kumite 61 kg
Bronze medal – third place	2019 Gaborone	Team kumite
Bronze medal – third place	2018 Kigali	Kumite 61 kg

Chaima Midi (born 1 February 1996) is an Algerian karateka. She won the gold medal in the women's 61 kg event at the 2019 African Games held in Rabat, Morocco. She also won one of the bronze medals in the women's team kumite event at the 2019 African Games.

== Career ==
She won the silver medal in her event at the 2019 African Karate Championships held in Gaborone, Botswana. She also won one of the bronze medals in the women's team kumite event.

In June 2021, she competed at the World Olympic Qualification Tournament held in Paris, France hoping to qualify for the 2020 Summer Olympics in Tokyo, Japan. In November 2021, she competed in the women's 61 kg event at the World Karate Championships held in Dubai, United Arab Emirates.

She won the gold medal in the women's 61 kg event at the 2022 Mediterranean Games held in Oran, Algeria. In the final, she defeated Wafa Mahjoub of Tunisia. In 2023, she competed in the women's 61 kg event at the World Karate Championships held in Budapest, Hungary.

== Achievements ==
Year	Competition	Venue	Rank	Event
2019	African Games	Rabat, Morocco	1st	Kumite 61 kg
2019	African Games	Rabat, Morocco	3rd	Team kumite
2022	Mediterranean Games	Oran, Algeria	1st	Kumite 61 kg
2024	African Games	Accra, Ghana	3rd	Kumite 61 kg
