= Karate at the 2026 Asian Games – Women's kumite 61 kg =

Women's kumite 61 kg at the 2026 Asian Games
- Venue: Toyohashi City General Gymnasium
- Date: 21 September 2026
- Competitors: 11 from 11 nations

Medalists
gold medal	Gong Li	China
silver medal	Assel Kanay	Kazakhstan
bronze medal	Sarara Shimada	Japan
bronze medal	Vann Chakriya	Cambodia

The women's kumite 61 kilograms competition at the 2026 Asian Games took place on 21 September 2026 at Toyohashi City General Gymnasium, Toyohashi. Gong Li of China entered the competition as the defending champion and defeated Kazakhstan's Assel Kanay 8–2 in the final to win the gold medal and retain her title.

The event also hosted the first inter-Korean match at the Asian Game in which South Korea's An Jeong-eun defeated North Korea's Jong Se-ri 3–0 in the quarterfinals; An then advanced to the semifinals, where she lost 8–0 to Gong.

== Schedule ==
All times are Japan Standard Time (UTC+09:00)

Date	Time	Event
Monday, 21 September 2026	14:35	Round of 16
Monday, 21 September 2026	14:35	Quarterfinals
Monday, 21 September 2026	14:35	Semifinals
Monday, 21 September 2026	14:35	Repechage
Monday, 21 September 2026	14:35	Bronze medal bouts
Monday, 21 September 2026	17:25	Final

== Results ==
=== Main bracket ===
Round of 16
Sonesavanh Chanthavong (LAO)	0
Jong Se-ri (PRK)	3
Sarara Shimada (JPN)	2
Gong Li (CHN)	6
Humaira Akhter Antara (BAN)	1
Assel Kanay (KAZ)	9

Quarterfinals
Jong Se-ri (PRK)	0
An Jeong-eun (KOR)	3
Gong Li (CHN)	8
Zakiah Adnan (MAS)	1
Assel Kanay (KAZ)	9
Pürevjavyn Maraljingoo (MGL)	1
Nourallah Naser (JOR)	0
Vann Chakriya (CAM)	6

Semifinals
An Jeong-eun (KOR)	0
Gong Li (CHN)	8
Assel Kanay (KAZ)	3
Vann Chakriya (CAM)	0

Final
Gong Li (CHN)	8
Assel Kanay (KAZ)	2

=== Repechage ===
Repechage round 1
Sarara Shimada (JPN)	1
Zakiah Adnan (MAS)	1
Humaira Akhter Antara (BAN)	8
Pürevjavyn Maraljingoo (MGL)	0

Bronze medal bouts
Sarara Shimada (JPN)	9
An Jeong-eun (KOR)	2
Humaira Akhter Antara (BAN)	0
Vann Chakriya (CAM)	5
