= Karate at the 2022 Asian Games – Women's kumite 61 kg =

Women's kumite 61 kg at the 2022 Asian Games
- Venue: Linping Sports Centre Gymnasium
- Date: 6 October 2023
- Competitors: 16 from 16 nations

Medalists
gold medal	Gong Li	China
silver medal	Nguyễn Thị Ngoan	Vietnam
bronze medal	Assel Kanay	Kazakhstan
bronze medal	Kymbat Toitonova	Kyrgyzstan

The women's kumite 61 kilograms competition at the 2022 Asian Games took place on 6 October 2023 at Linping Sports Centre Gymnasium, Hangzhou.

== Schedule ==
All times are China Standard Time (UTC+08:00)

Date	Time	Event
Friday, 6 October 2023	14:30	Round of 16
Friday, 6 October 2023	14:30	Quarterfinals
Friday, 6 October 2023	14:30	Semifinals
Friday, 6 October 2023	14:30	Repechages
Friday, 6 October 2023	14:30	Finals

== Results ==
=== Main bracket ===
Round of 16
Assel Kanay (KAZ)	6
Zakiah Adnan (MAS)	0
Jamie Lim (PHI)	3
Zulkhumor Tursunalieva (UZB)	1
Atousa Golshadnejad (IRI)	4
Sarah Al-Ameri (UAE)	1
Marta de Jesus (MAC)	1
Nguyễn Thị Ngoan (VIE)	5
Vilatda Boupphavanh (LAO)	0
Vann Chakriya (CAM)	3
Muna Al-Diri (JOR)	0
Gong Li (CHN)	3
Chae Min-yeong (KOR)	0
Kymbat Toitonova (KGZ)	8
Nirupa Dong Tamang (NEP)	1
Humaira Akhter Antara (BAN)	5

Quarterfinals
Assel Kanay (KAZ)	1
Jamie Lim (PHI)	0
Atousa Golshadnejad (IRI)	2
Nguyễn Thị Ngoan (VIE)	2
Vann Chakriya (CAM)	0
Gong Li (CHN)	8
Kymbat Toitonova (KGZ)	9
Humaira Akhter Antara (BAN)	1

Semifinals
Assel Kanay (KAZ)	5
Nguyễn Thị Ngoan (VIE)	7
Gong Li (CHN)	10
Kymbat Toitonova (KGZ)	0

Gold medal contest
Nguyễn Thị Ngoan (VIE)	0
Gong Li (CHN)	9

=== Repechage ===
Repechage round 1
Marta de Jesus (MAC)	0
Atousa Golshadnejad (IRI)	2
Muna Al-Diri (JOR)	0
Vann Chakriya (CAM)	3

Bronze medal bouts
Atousa Golshadnejad (IRI)	0
Assel Kanay (KAZ)	1
Vann Chakriya (CAM)	0
Kymbat Toitonova (KGZ)	4
