= Dancesport at the 2017 World Games – Rock'n'Roll =

Rock'n'Roll at the 2017 World Games
- Venue: Centennial Hall
- Date: 29 July 2017
- Competitors: 28 from 14 nations

Medalists
1st place, gold medalist(s)		Jacek Tarczyło; Anna Miadzielec	Poland
2nd place, silver medalist(s)		Konstantin Chistikov; Ksenia Osnovina	Russia
3rd place, bronze medalist(s)		Tobias Bludau; Michelle Uhl	Germany

The rock'n'roll competition at the 2017 World Games took place on 29 July 2017 at the Centennial Hall in Wrocław, Poland.

== Competition format ==
A total of 14 pairs from 14 nations entered the competition. In first round best four pairs qualified directly to the semifinal. In the hope round additional eight pairs are advancing to the semifinal. From semifinal the best six pairs qualifies to the final, where they dance two programmes: foot technique and acrobatic.

== Results ==
=== First round ===
Rank	Athletes	Nation	Score	Note
1	Konstantin Chistikov/Ksenia Osnovina	Russia	82.82	Q
2	Jacek Tarczyło/Anna Miadzielec	Poland	80.18	Q
3	Tobias Bludau/Michelle Uhl	Germany	78.95	Q
4	Steinar Berg/Anne Ragnhild	Norway	74.92	Q
5	Filip Kočiš/Andrea Hrušková	Slovakia	72.06	
6	Marek Divoký/Lenka Richtrová	Czech Republic	69.85	
7	Nicolas Thevenon/Melitine Poulios	France	67.59	
8	Stephan Schlegel/Gwendoline Schlegel	Switzerland	52.43	
9	Thomas Glaser/Verena Lampeter	Austria	50.32	
10	Jonathan Bell/Megan Bolton	Australia	49.43	
11	Franci Pevc/Tina Rabič	Slovenia	27.90	
12	Sabine Mendy/Clarisse Lea Sagna	Senegal	25.25	
13	Jorge Vera/Santia Hinostroza	Peru	22.39	
14	Swapnil Londhe/Tanushree Rakshit	India	2.40	

=== Hope round ===
Rank	Athletes	Nation	Score	Note
1	Marek Divoký/Lenka Richtrová	Czech Republic	72.37	Q
2	Filip Kočiš/Andrea Hrušková	Slovakia	71.66	Q
3	Nicolas Thevenon/Melitine Poulios	France	71.65	Q
4	Stephan Schlegel/Gwendoline Schlegel	Switzerland	69.22	Q
5	Thomas Glaser/Verena Lampeter	Austria	57.18	Q
6	Sabine Mendy/Clarisse Lea Sagna	Senegal	33.84	Q
7	Franci Pevc/Tina Rabič	Slovenia	28.09	Q
8	Swapnil Londhe/Tanushree Rakshit	India	7.44	Q
9	Jorge Vera/Santia Hinostroza	Peru	3.32	
10	Jonathan Bell/Megan Bolton	Australia	-49.32	

=== Semifinal ===
Rank	Athletes	Nation	Score	Note
1	Jacek Tarczyło/Anna Miadzielec	Poland	114.46	Q
2	Konstantin Chistikov/Ksenia Osnovina	Russia	113.99	Q
3	Tobias Bludau/Michelle Uhl	Germany	103.38	Q
4	Steinar Berg/Anne Ragnhild	Norway	98.92	Q
5	Marek Divoký/Lenka Richtrová	Czech Republic	90.73	Q
6	Nicolas Thevenon/Melitine Poulios	France	89.75	Q
7	Filip Kočiš/Andrea Hrušková	Slovakia	89.67	
8	Stephan Schlegel/Gwendoline Schlegel	Switzerland	85.64	
9	Franci Pevc/Tina Rabič	Slovenia	76.64	
10	Thomas Glaser/Verena Lampeter	Austria	69.50	
11	Sabine Mendy/Clarisse Lea Sagna	Senegal	34.58	
12	Swapnil Londhe/Tanushree Rakshit	India	-16.65	

=== Final ===
Rank	Athletes	Nation	Foot technique	Acrobatic
1st place, gold medalist(s)	Jacek Tarczyło/Anna Miadzielec	Poland	27.64	115.63
2nd place, silver medalist(s)	Konstantin Chistikov/Ksenia Osnovina	Russia	25.20	109.98
3rd place, bronze medalist(s)	Tobias Bludau/Michelle Uhl	Germany	23.84	108.49
4	Steinar Berg/Anne Ragnhild	Norway	20.31	98.78
5	Nicolas Thevenon/Melitine Poulios	France	21.48	89.59
6	Marek Divoký/Lenka Richtrová	Czech Republic	19.88	89.07
