= 2026 European Karate Championships – Women's 61 kg =

Women's 61 kg at the 2026 European Karate Championships
- Venue: Eissporthalle Frankfurt
- Location: Frankfurt, Germany
- Dates: 20, 23 May
- Competitors: 34 from 34 nations

Medalists
gold medal	Altana Basangova
silver medal	Mia Greta Zorko	Croatia
bronze medal	Ingrida Suchánková	Slovakia
bronze medal	Emina Sipović	Bosnia and Herzegovina

The women's 61 kg competition at the 2026 European Karate Championships was held on 20 and 23 May 2026.

== Results ==
=== Finals ===
Semifinals
(Croatia) Mia Greta Zorko	5
(Slovakia) Ingrida Suchánková	3
(Azerbaijan) Gulay Orujova	1
Altana Basangova	4

Final
(Croatia) Mia Greta Zorko	4
Altana Basangova	6

=== Repechage ===
Repechage 1
(Portugal) Daniela Lourenço	0
(Turkey) Fatma Naz Yenen	6

Repechage 2
(Turkey) Fatma Naz Yenen	9
(Montenegro) Nadja Boričić	1

Bronze medal
(Turkey) Fatma Naz Yenen	3
(Slovakia) Ingrida Suchánková	7

Repechage 1
(Switzerland) Nina Radjenovic	3
(Bosnia and Herzegovina) Emina Sipović	4

Repechage 2
(Bosnia and Herzegovina) Emina Sipović	4
(Ukraine) Oleksandra Sholokhova	1

Bronze medal
(Bosnia and Herzegovina) Emina Sipović	4
(Azerbaijan) Gulay Orujova	0

=== Top half ===
==== Section 1 ====
Round of 64
(Montenegro) Nadja Boričić	8
(Iceland) Eydís Magnéa Friðriksdóttir	0

Round of 32
(Montenegro) Nadja Boričić	1
(Denmark) Karla Bohnhof	0
(Netherlands) Ashley Kakiay	4
(Cyprus) Anthi Stylianou	0
(Portugal) Daniela Lourenço	1
(Croatia) Mia Greta Zorko	3
(Austria) Lejla Topalovic	2
(Turkey) Fatma Naz Yenen	3

Round of 16
(Montenegro) Nadja Boričić	4
(Netherlands) Ashley Kakiay	0
(Croatia) Mia Greta Zorko	5
(Turkey) Fatma Naz Yenen	4

Quarterfinals
(Montenegro) Nadja Boričić	3
(Croatia) Mia Greta Zorko	7

==== Section 2 ====
Round of 32
Yana Konnava	1
(Kosovo) Elmedina Istogu	2
(Poland) Katarzyna Lewandowska	0
(Lithuania) Gabrielė Marozaitė	2
(Slovakia) Ingrida Suchánková	10
(Luxembourg) Sarah Gawellek	1
(Greece) Maria Stoli	1
(France) Monica Arzumian	10

Round of 16
(Kosovo) Elmedina Istogu	2
(Lithuania) Gabrielė Marozaitė	8
(Slovakia) Ingrida Suchánková	1
(France) Monica Arzumian	0

Quarterfinals
(Lithuania) Gabrielė Marozaitė	0
(Slovakia) Ingrida Suchánková	1

=== Bottom half ===
==== Section 3 ====
Round of 64
(Slovenia) Hana Debeljak	4
(Serbia) Nevena Filipov	4

Round of 32
(Serbia) Nevena Filipov	2
(Hungary) Aicha Harspataki	3
(Azerbaijan) Gulay Orujova	2
(Belgium) Maryam Ajaray	0
(Latvia) Beata Girvica	8
(Scotland) Elize Bauld	3
(Spain) Mar Trenado	4
(Germany) Anastasiia Semenenko	1

Round of 16
(Hungary) Aicha Harspataki	2
(Azerbaijan) Gulay Orujova	8
(Latvia) Beata Girvica	3
(Spain) Mar Trenado	4

Quarterfinals
(Azerbaijan) Gulay Orujova	5
(Spain) Mar Trenado	3

==== Section 4 ====
Round of 32
(Bosnia and Herzegovina) Emina Sipović	3
(England) Jasmine Pomeroy	1
(Switzerland) Nina Radjenovic	0
Altana Basangova	5
(Italy) Irene Marturano	0
(North Macedonia) Veronika Kostovska	8
(Romania) Miruna Mălăuță	1
(Ukraine) Oleksandra Sholokhova	3

Round of 16
(Bosnia and Herzegovina) Emina Sipović	0
Altana Basangova	5
(North Macedonia) Veronika Kostovska	4
(Ukraine) Oleksandra Sholokhova	14

Quarterfinals
Altana Basangova	0
(Ukraine) Oleksandra Sholokhova	0
