= 2025 European Karate Championships – Women's 61 kg =

European Karate Championship

Women's 61 kg at the 2025 European Karate Championships
- Venue: Karen Demirchyan Sports and Concerts Complex
- Location: Yerevan, Armenia
- Dates: 8, 10 May
- Competitors: 33 from 31 nations

Medalists
gold medal	Oleksandra Soholova	Ukraine
silver medal	Beata Girvica	Latvia
bronze medal	Anna-Johanna Nilsson	Sweden
bronze medal	Anastasiia Semenenko	Germany

The Women's 61 kg competition at the 2025 European Karate Championships was held on 8 and 10 May 2025.

== Results ==
=== Finals ===
Semifinals
(Latvia) Beata Girvica	2
(Romania) Miruna Mălăuță	0
(Ukraine) Oleksandra Soholova	3
(Germany) Anastasiia Semenenko	2

Final
(Latvia) Beata Girvica	0
(Ukraine) Oleksandra Soholova	2

=== Repechage ===
Repechage 1
(Slovenia) Hana Debeljak	4
(Croatia) Mia Greta Zorko	7

Repechage 2
(Croatia) Mia Greta Zorko	2
(Sweden) Anna-Johanna Nilsson	4

Bronze medal
(Sweden) Anna-Johanna Nilsson	8
(Romania) Miruna Mălăuță	0

Repechage 1
Anastasiya Chupina	1
(Switzerland) Nina Radjenovic	2

Repechage 2
(Switzerland) Nina Radjenovic	1
Maryia Azarava	2

Bronze medal
Maryia Azarava	0
(Germany) Anastasiia Semenenko	4

=== Top half ===
==== Section 1 ====
Round of 64
(Slovenia) Hana Debeljak	2
(England) Jasmine Pomeroy	1

Round of 32
(Slovenia) Hana Debeljak	1
(Latvia) Beata Girvica	4
(Croatia) Mia Greta Zorko	8
(Denmark) Trine Fuyu Lind	0
(Scotland) Carly McNab	3
(Hungary) Aicha Zakia Boussebaa	4
(Italy) Veronica Brunori	4
(Sweden) Anna-Johanna Nilsson	5

Round of 16
(Latvia) Beata Girvica	6
(Croatia) Mia Greta Zorko	3
(Hungary) Aicha Zakia Boussebaa	1
(Sweden) Anna-Johanna Nilsson	3

Quarterfinals
(Latvia) Beata Girvica	2
(Sweden) Anna-Johanna Nilsson	0

==== Section 2 ====
Round of 32
(Cyprus) Anthi Stylianou	5
(Iceland) Eydís Friðriksdóttir	5
(Georgia (country)) Ani Patrishvili	0
(Austria) Lejla Topalovic	4
(Slovakia) Anna Váczy	2
(Kosovo) Elmedina Istogu	4
(Romania) Miruna Mălăuță	3
(Belgium) Maryam Ajaray	2

Round of 16
(Cyprus) Anthi Stylianou	0
(Austria) Lejla Topalovic	8
(Kosovo) Elmedina Istogu	5
(Romania) Miruna Mălăuță	11

Quarterfinals
(Austria) Lejla Topalovic	0
(Romania) Miruna Mălăuță	0

=== Bottom half ===
==== Section 3 ====
Round of 32
(Switzerland) Nina Radjenovic	3
(North Macedonia) Veronika Kostovska	0
Anastasiya Chupina	1
(Ukraine) Oleksandra Soholova	1
(Greece) Lydia Xenou	0
Maryia Azarava	1
(Netherlands) Ashley Kakiay	0
(Turkey) Fatma Naz Yenen	0

Round of 16
(Switzerland) Nina Radjenovic	0
(Ukraine) Oleksandra Soholova	4
Maryia Azarava	0
(Netherlands) Ashley Kakiay	0

Quarterfinals
(Ukraine) Oleksandra Soholova	1
Maryia Azarava	0

==== Section 4 ====
Round of 32
(Germany) Anastasiia Semenenko	4
(Montenegro) Nađa Boričić	0
(Bosnia and Herzegovina) Emina Sipović	1
(Spain) Mar Trenado	3
(Lithuania) Gabrielė Marozaitė	3
(Serbia) Nevena Filipov	8
(Poland) Katarzyna Lewandowska	0
(France) Sydney Yvon	6

Round of 16
(Germany) Anastasiia Semenenko	0
(Spain) Mar Trenado	0
(Serbia) Nevena Filipov	0
(France) Sydney Yvon	2

Quarterfinals
(Germany) Anastasiia Semenenko	4
(France) Sydney Yvon	2
