= Gong Li (karateka) =

Chinese karateka (born 1999)

Personal information
- Born: 16 August 1999 (age 27) Beijing, China

Sport
- Country: China
- Sport: Karate
- Events: Kumite; Team kumite
Medal record
Women's karate
Representing China
Olympic Games
Bronze medal – third place	2020 Tokyo	Kumite +61 kg
World Games
Gold medal – first place	2025 Chengdu	Kumite 61 kg
World Championships
Gold medal – first place	2023 Budapest	Kumite 61 kg
Silver medal – second place	2025 Cairo	Kumite 61 kg
Asian Games
Gold medal – first place	2022 Hangzhou	Kumite 61 kg
Gold medal – first place	2026 Aichi–Nagoya	Kumite 61 kg
Asian Championships
Bronze medal – third place	2019 Tashkent	Team kumite
Bronze medal – third place	2023 Malacca	Kumite 61 kg
Bronze medal – third place	2023 Malacca	Team kumite
Bronze medal – third place	2026 Bali	Kumite 61 kg

Gong Li (born 16 August 1999) is a Chinese karateka who won a bronze medal at the postponed 2020 Summer Olympics. In 2023, she won the gold medal in the women's 61 kg event at the 2022 Asian Games held in Hangzhou, China, and successfully defended her title at the 2026 Asian Games in Aichi-Nagoya, Japan.

== Life ==
She was educated at Beijing Sport University and she lives in Beijing.

In 2018, she represented her country at the world championships in Madrid, Spain.

In 2020, she won the 68 kg weight class at the national championships.

She represented her country at the 2020 Summer Olympics in Tokyo. An early match was against the eventual Gold Medal winner Feryal Abdelaziz of Egypt. She lost (4–0). She went on to the semi-finals where she took the bronze medal.

She won the gold medal in the women's 61 kg event at the 2023 World Karate Championships held in Budapest, Hungary. Later that year, she won the women's 61 kg kumite gold medal at the 2022 Asian Games in Hangzhou, China.

In 2026, she successfully defended her Asian Games title by winning the women's 61 kg kumite gold medal at the 2026 Asian Games in Aichi-Nagoya, Japan. She defeated Japan's Sarara Shimada (6–2) and Malaysia's Zakiah Adnan (8–1) before defeating South Korea's An Jeong-eun (8–0) in the semifinals. In the final, she defeated Kazakhstan's Assel Kanay (8–2) to win the gold medal.
