= Kristina Mah =

Australian karateka

Sport
- Country: Australia
- Sport: Karate
- Weight class: 61 kg
- Event: Kumite
Medal record
Women's karate
Representing Australia
World Karate Championships
Gold medal – first place	2010 Belgrade	Kumite 61 kg
World Combat Games
Silver medal – second place	2013 Saint Petersburg	Kumite 61 kg

Kristina Mah is an Australian karateka. She is a gold medalist at the World Karate Championships.

== Career ==
In 2010, she won the gold medal in the women's kumite 61 kg event at the 2010 World Karate Championships held in Belgrade, Serbia. In 2012, she was eliminated from the competition in the same event at 2012 World Karate Championships by Boutheina Hasnaoui of Tunisia. Hasnaoui went on to win the silver medal. In 2013, she won the silver medal in the women's kumite 61 kg event at the 2013 World Combat Games held in Saint Petersburg, Russia.

In 2017, she represented Australia at the 2017 World Games held in Wrocław, Poland in the women's kumite 61 kg event. She was eliminated from the competition by Alexandra Grande of Peru. Grande went on to win the gold medal.

In 2021, she competed at the World Olympic Qualification Tournament held in Paris, France hoping to qualify for the 2020 Summer Olympics in Tokyo, Japan. In 2023, she competed in the women's 61 kg event at the World Karate Championships held in Budapest, Hungary.

== Achievements ==
Year	Competition	Venue	Rank	Event
2010	World Championships	Belgrade, Serbia	1st	Kumite 61 kg
2013	World Combat Games	Saint Petersburg, Russia	2nd	Kumite 61 kg
