= 2024 European Karate Championships – Women's 61 kg =

European Karate Championship

Women's 61 kg at the 2024 European Karate Championships
- Venue: Krešimir Ćosić Hall
- Location: Zadar, Croatia
- Dates: 10–11 May
- Nations: 33
- Teams: 33

Medalists
gold medal	Ingrida Suchánková	Slovakia
silver medal	Lejla Topalovic	Austria
bronze medal	Fatma Naz Yenen	Turkey
bronze medal	Reem Khamis	Germany

The women's 61 kg competition at the 2024 European Karate Championships was held from 10 to 11 May 2024.

== Results ==
=== Final ===
Final
Ingrida Suchánková (SVK)	6
Lejla Topalovic (AUT)	5

=== Top half ===
Round of 64
	Score	
Jasmine Pomeroy (ENG)	0–2	Indira Garcia (ESP)

Round of 32
Indira Garcia (ESP)	1
Maria Azarava (ANA)	4
Nevena Filipov (SRB)	8
Nina Radjenovic (SUI)	1
Aleksandra Davidova (LAT)	2
Aysu Aliyeva (AZE)	0
Aleksandra Ilankovic (HUN)	1
Fatma Naz Yenen (TUR)	3
Hana Debeljak (SLO)	0
Anna-Johanna Nilsson (SWE)	4
Veronika Kostovska (MKD)	0
Laura Sivert (FRA)	1
Ingrida Suchánková (SVK)	2
Renata Baptista (POR)	1
Ashley Kakiay (NED)	5
Anita Serogina (UKR)	4

Round of 16
Maria Azarava (ANA)	0
Nevena Filipov (SRB)	3
Aleksandra Davidova (LAT)	0
Fatma Naz Yenen (TUR)	1
Anna-Johanna Nilsson (SWE)	0
Laura Sivert (FRA)	0
Ingrida Suchánková (SVK)	3
Ashley Kakiay (NED)	1

Quarterfinals
Nevena Filipov (SRB)	2
Fatma Naz Yenen (TUR)	4
Anna-Johanna Nilsson (SWE)	2
Ingrida Suchánková (SVK)	3

Semifinals
Fatma Naz Yenen (TUR)	2
Ingrida Suchánková (SVK)	2

=== Bottom half ===
Round of 32
Mia Čačko (CRO)	2
Carly McNab (SCO)	5
Elmedina Istogu (KOS)	3
Konstantina Chrysopoulou (GRE)	2
Miruna Mălăuţă (ROU)	1
Lejla Topalovic (AUT)	6
Daniela Holk (POL)	2
Maryam Ajaray (BEL)	4
Gabrielė Marozaitė (LTU)	5
Tina Vujadinović (MNE)	5
Emina Sipović (BIH)	4
Erika Batakujevic (DEN)	3
Giulia Angelucci (ITA)	3
Kiia Koponen (FIN)	0
Anthea Stylianou (CYP)	0
Reem Khamis (GER)	4

Round of 16
Carly McNab (SCO)	1
Elmedina Istogu (KOS)	4
Lejla Topalovic (AUT)	4
Maryam Ajaray (BEL)	1
Tina Vujadinović (MNE)	0
Emina Sipović (BIH)	8
Giulia Angelucci (ITA)	1
Reem Khamis (GER)	4

Quarterfinals
Elmedina Istogu (KOS)	0
Lejla Topalovic (AUT)	2
Emina Sipović (BIH)	4
Reem Khamis (GER)	4

Semifinals
Lejla Topalovic (AUT)	2
Reem Khamis (GER)	1

=== Repechage ===
Repechage round 1
Renata Baptista (POR)	0
Ashley Kakiay (NED)	1
Maryam Ajaray (BEL)	1
Miruna Mălăuţă (ROU)	2

Repechage round 2
Anna-Johanna Nilsson (SWE)	0
Ashley Kakiay (NED)	0
Elmedina Istogu (KOS)	2
Miruna Mălăuţă (ROU)	3

Bronze medals
Fatma Naz Yenen (TUR)	2
Ashley Kakiay (NED)	1
Reem Khamis (GER)	9
Miruna Mălăuţă (ROU)	4
