= 2021 World Karate Championships – Women's 61 kg =

World Karate Championship

Women's kumite 61 kg at the 2021 World Karate Championships
- Venue: Hamdan Sports Complex
- Location: Dubai, United Arab Emirates
- Dates: 17–20 November
- Competitors: 62 from 62 nations

Medalists
gold medal	Jovana Preković	Serbia
silver medal	Anita Serogina	Ukraine
bronze medal	Lynn Snel	Netherlands
bronze medal	Alexandra Grande	Peru

The Women's 61 kg competition at the 2021 World Karate Championships was held from 17 to 20 November 2021.

== Results ==
=== Finals ===
Semifinals
(Ukraine) Anita Serogina	0
(Canada) Haya Jumaa	0
(Slovakia) Ingrida Suchánková	2
(Serbia) Jovana Preković	3

Final
(Ukraine) Anita Serogina	1
(Serbia) Jovana Preković	2

=== Repechage ===
Repechage 1
(Netherlands) Lynn Snel	0
(Cyprus) Anthea Stylianou	0

Repechage 2
(Netherlands) Lynn Snel	6
(Spain) Indira Zúñiga	2

Repechage 3
(Netherlands) Lynn Snel	1
(Philippines) Jamie Lim	1

Bronze medal
(Netherlands) Lynn Snel	5
(Canada) Haya Jumaa	2

Repechage 2
(Poland) Dorota Banaszczyk	1
(Peru) Alexandra Grande	1

Repechage 3
(Peru) Alexandra Grande	5
(Algeria) Chaima Midi	4

Bronze medal
(Peru) Alexandra Grande	6
(Slovakia) Ingrida Suchánková	5

=== Top half ===
==== Section 1 ====
First round
(Germany) Anna Miggou	0
(Japan) Sarara Shimada	5
(Mexico) Xhunashi Caballero	1
(England) Natalie Williams	1
Alana Kochieva	2
(Philippines) Jamie Lim	4
(France) Laura Sivert	1
(Kazakhstan) Nikol Tsengel	1
(Belarus) Maryia Azarava	6
(Cyprus) Anthea Stylianou	9
(Netherlands) Lynn Snel	0
(Ukraine) Anita Serogina	1
(Republic of Ireland) Ayla O'Sullivan	8
(Turkmenistan) Ogultach Bayramova	0
Devina Dea	0
(Spain) Indira Zúñiga	1

Second round
(Japan) Sarara Shimada	2
(Mexico) Xhunashi Caballero	0
(Philippines) Jamie Lim	0
(France) Laura Sivert	0
(Cyprus) Anthea Stylianou	0
(Ukraine) Anita Serogina	1
(Republic of Ireland) Ayla O'Sullivan	0
(Spain) Indira Zúñiga	3

Third round
(Japan) Sarara Shimada	0
(Philippines) Jamie Lim	0
(Ukraine) Anita Serogina	1
(Spain) Indira Zúñiga	1

Quarterfinals
(Philippines) Jamie Lim	1
(Ukraine) Anita Serogina	2

==== Section 2 ====
First round
(Hungary) Aleksandra Ilankovic	4
(Jordan) Joud Al-Drous	0
(Tunisia) Wafa Mahjoub	7
(Norway) Bettina Alstadsæther	7
(South Africa) Elsabe Le Roux	0
(United States) Elisa Au	1
(Sweden) Anna-Johanna Nilsson	3
(Bolivia) Briza Sandoval	0
(Chile) Bárbara Huaiquimán	0
(Canada) Haya Jumaa	10
(Bosnia and Herzegovina) Marina Kurteš	0
(Turkey) Merve Çoban	0
(Kenya) Kanini Muli	1
(Puerto Rico) Janessa Fonseca	6

Second round
(Hungary) Aleksandra Ilankovic	8
(Tunisia) Wafa Mahjoub	8
(United States) Elisa Au	1
(Sweden) Anna-Johanna Nilsson	3
(Canada) Haya Jumaa	1
(Turkey) Merve Çoban	0
(Puerto Rico) Janessa Fonseca	3
(Uzbekistan) Zulkhumor Tursunalieva	1

Third round
(Tunisia) Wafa Mahjoub	0
(Sweden) Anna-Johanna Nilsson	0
(Canada) Haya Jumaa	6
(Puerto Rico) Janessa Fonseca	0

Quarterfinals
(Sweden) Anna-Johanna Nilsson	0
(Canada) Haya Jumaa	1

=== Bottom half ===
==== Section 3 ====
First round
(Switzerland) Nina Radjenovic	4
(Belgium) Nele De Vos	0
(India) Deepika Dhiman	0
(Romania) Miruna Mălăuță	2
(Italy) Alessandra Mangiacapra	3
(Croatia) Ana Lenard	2
(Chinese Taipei) Ku Tsui-ping	0
(Bangladesh) Humaira Akther Antara	0
(Czech Republic) Lucie Veithová	1
(Slovakia) Ingrida Suchánková	7
(Brazil) Sabrina Zefino Pereira	4
(Singapore) Kok Shi Yun	0
(Estonia) Anna Sokk	1
(Slovenia) Tjaša Ristić	0
(Senegal) Magatte Seck	0
(Denmark) Sarah Lundquist Aakerman	0

Second round
(Switzerland) Nina Radjenovic	2
(Romania) Miruna Mălăuță	0
(Italy) Alessandra Mangiacapra	2
(Chinese Taipei) Ku Tsui-ping	1
(Slovakia) Ingrida Suchánková	3
(Brazil) Sabrina Zefino Pereira	0
(Estonia) Anna Sokk	2
(Senegal) Magatte Seck	0

Third round
(Switzerland) Nina Radjenovic	0
(Italy) Alessandra Mangiacapra	2
(Slovakia) Ingrida Suchánková	5
(Estonia) Anna Sokk	1

Quarterfinals
(Italy) Alessandra Mangiacapra	1
(Slovakia) Ingrida Suchánková	10

==== Section 4 ====
First round
(Algeria) Chaima Midi	4
(Egypt) Noursin Aly	4
(Malaysia) Mathivani Murugeesan	3
(Montenegro) Ksenija Rajović	2
(Hong Kong) Hei Wood Chow	1
(Colombia) Diana Ramírez	2
(North Macedonia) Veronika Kostovska	0
(Ecuador) Jacqueline Factos	0
(Peru) Alexandra Grande	3
(Greece) Christina Konstantina Nika	1
(Azerbaijan) Ayla Rzazade	0
(Morocco) Fatima-Zahra Chajai	3
(Poland) Dorota Banaszczyk	1
Arm Sukkiaw	0

Second round
(Algeria) Chaima Midi	1
(Malaysia) Mathivani Murugeesan	0
(Colombia) Diana Ramírez	1
(Ecuador) Jacqueline Factos	2
(Peru) Alexandra Grande	6
(Morocco) Fatima-Zahra Chajai	0
(Poland) Dorota Banaszczyk	0
(Serbia) Jovana Preković	4

Third round
(Algeria) Chaima Midi	2
(Ecuador) Jacqueline Factos	1
(Peru) Alexandra Grande	0
(Serbia) Jovana Preković	5

Quarterfinals
(Algeria) Chaima Midi	0
(Serbia) Jovana Preković	8
