= Cheryl Murphy =

American karateka (born 1978)

- Born: 17 October 1978 (age 46); Olympia, Washington (United States)
- Style: Kumite
- Teacher(s): Herbert Wiles

Cheryl Murphy
Medal record

Women's karate

Representing United States

World Combat Games
Bronze medal – third place	2013 Saint Petersburg	Kumite −68

Cheryl Murphy (born October 17, 1978) is an American martial artist. She is a member of Team USA and a current Shotokan Karate fighter. She is stated to be a world class competition kumite competitor.

== Personal life ==
She was born in Olympia, Washington and resides in Queens, NY. She received her master's degree in Community Health at Long Island University.

== Career ==
She competes in the 68 kilograms (150 lb) division. Murphy has been a member of the Senior US Team since 2002. Murphy is ranked by the World Karate Federation She won the national division, US Open, and a gold medal in the 2012 Pan Americans. Murphy competed in the fifth World University Karate Championships in New York. She has held numerous top 5 rankings in Karate In 2011, she finished 9th in the Pan Am games She competed at the Karate at the 2013 World Combat Games, winning a bronze medal.

She is strong advocate of Karate being inducted into the Olympic Games and now works for FNB as a Quartz CFC person
