= Humaira Akhter Antara =

Bangladeshi karateka (born 2000)

Personal information
- Native name: হুমায়রা আক্তার অন্তরা
- Nationality: Bangladeshi
- Born: March 25, 2000 (age 26)

Sport
- Sport: Karate
- Events: Kumite (−61 kg), Kata
- Club: Bangladesh Ansar
Medal record
Representing Bangladesh
South Asian Games
Gold medal – first place	2019 Kathmandu	Kumite −61 kg
Silver medal – second place	2019 Kathmandu	Team kumite
Bronze medal – third place	2019 Kathmandu	Individual kata

Humaira Akhter Antara (also spelled Humaira Akhter Antora and Humayra Akter Antora; Bengali: হুমায়রা আক্তার অন্তরা; born 25 March 2000) is a Bangladeshi karateka. At the 2019 South Asian Games, she won gold in women's −61 kg kumite, silver in team kumite and bronze in individual kata. She was one of Bangladesh's flag bearers at the opening ceremony of the 2026 Asian Games.

== Early life ==
Humaira Akhter Antara was born on 25 March 2000. She grew up in Dhaka, while her family has roots in Rajbari. She attended a madrasa until the seventh grade, and completed her Higher Secondary Certificate at Willes Little Flower School and College in 2019. As of December 2019, she was studying accounting at Dhaka City College. She missed university admission examinations while attending the training camp for the 2019 South Asian Games.

== Sporting career ==
Antara began learning karate in 2013. She has said that self-defence as one of her reasons for taking up the sport. Her early trainers included twin brothers known as "Sun" and "Moon". She and her younger sister Jannatul Ferdous Sumi joined Bangladesh Ansar on contracts in 2014. At her first national championship in 2017, she won two silver medals and a bronze. The following year, she won gold in all three events she entered.

She won Bangladesh's first medal of the 2019 South Asian Games, a bronze in women's individual kata, on 2 December 2019. The next day, she won women's −61 kg kumite gold, defeating Nepal's Anu Gurung 5–2 in the final. She also won silver in women's team kumite alongside Mounjera Borna, Marzan Akter Priya and Naima Khatun, finishing the Games with three medals.

During the COVID-19 pandemic, Antara trained at home with her sisters. In a May 2020 interview, she said that the suspension of competitions and coaching had affected her income.

In April 2021, she won women's −61 kg kumite gold at the Bangladesh Games in Bandarban. At the 2022 Asian Games, held in Hangzhou in 2023, Antara defeated Nepal's Nirupa Tamang 5–1 in the women's −61 kg kumite round of 16 before losing 1–9 to Kyrgyzstan's Kymbat Toitonova in the quarter-finals.

At the 2025 Islamic Solidarity Games in Riyadh, Antara was eliminated in the women's −61 kg kumite round of 16 by Malaysia's Jayashree Pathiyanathan, who won on senshu after a 4–4 draw.

Antara and shooter Abdullah Hel Baki were Bangladesh's flagbearers at the opening ceremony of the 2026 Asian Games in Aichi–Nagoya in September 2026. In women's −61 kg kumite, Antara lost 1–9 to Kazakhstan's Assel Kanay in the round of 16, defeated Mongolia's Maraljingoo Purevjav 8–0 in the repechage, and lost 0–5 to Cambodia's Chakriya Vann in the bronze-medal bout, finishing joint fifth.

== Personal life ==
Antara has three younger sisters, who have also trained in karate. Her sister Jannatul Ferdous Sumi has competed at national level. In September 2020, Antara married fellow karateka Hossain Khan Moon, who had been a gold medallist at the 2010 South Asian Games. In 2023, she spoke about her husband's support for her training and career, as well as about how her parents had initially opposed her taking up karate, but she had told them them that learning self-defence was important for her safety.
