= Karate at the 2013 World Combat Games =

Karate competition

Karate, for the 2013 World Combat Games, was held at the Spartak - Sports Complex 'Arena', in Saint Petersburg, Russia. Competition took place on the 20 and 21 October 2013.

== Medal table ==
* Host nation (Russia)

| Rank | Nation | Gold | Silver | Bronze | Total |
|---|---|---|---|---|---|
| 1 | France (FRA) | 2 | 1 | 1 | 4 |
| 2 | Azerbaijan (AZE) | 2 | 0 | 0 | 2 |
| 3 | Japan (JPN) | 1 | 2 | 0 | 3 |
| 4 | Egypt (EGY) | 1 | 1 | 2 | 4 |
| 5 | Russia (RUS)* | 1 | 1 | 1 | 3 |
| 6 | Iran (IRI) | 1 | 1 | 0 | 2 |
| 7 | Turkey (TUR) | 1 | 0 | 2 | 3 |
| 8 | Croatia (CRO) | 1 | 0 | 0 | 1 |
| 8 | Mexico (MEX) | 1 | 0 | 0 | 1 |
| 8 | Venezuela (VEN) | 1 | 0 | 0 | 1 |
| 11 | Australia (AUS) | 0 | 1 | 0 | 1 |
| 11 | China (CHN) | 0 | 1 | 0 | 1 |
| 11 | Italy (ITA) | 0 | 1 | 0 | 1 |
| 11 | Latvia (LAT) | 0 | 1 | 0 | 1 |
| 11 | Morocco (MAR) | 0 | 1 | 0 | 1 |
| 11 | Spain (ESP) | 0 | 1 | 0 | 1 |
| 17 | United States (USA) | 0 | 0 | 2 | 2 |
| 18 | Brazil (BRA) | 0 | 0 | 1 | 1 |
| 18 | Colombia (COL) | 0 | 0 | 1 | 1 |
| 18 | Germany (GER) | 0 | 0 | 1 | 1 |
| 18 | Tunisia (TUN) | 0 | 0 | 1 | 1 |
| Totals (21 entries) | | 12 | 12 | 12 | 36 |

== Medal summary ==
=== Men ===
| Event | Gold | Silver | Bronze |
|---|---|---|---|
| Kata | Antonio José Díaz Fernández (VEN) | Ryo Kiyuna (JPN) | Ibrahim Magdy Moussa Ibra Ahmed (EGY) |
| Kumite 60 kg | Magomedraul Murtazaliev (RUS) | Kalvis Kalniņš (LAT) | Douglas Brose (BRA) |
| Kumite 67 kg | Saeid Ahmadi (IRI) | Redouan Kousseksou (MAR) | Jose Guillermo Ramirez Gutierrez (COL) |
| Kumite 75 kg | Rafael Aghayev (AZE) | Luigi Busà (ITA) | Noah Bitsch (GER) |
| Kumite 84 kg | Kenji Grillon (FRA) | Ryutaro Araga (JPN) | Hany Shaker El Sayed Keshta (EGY) |
| Kumite +84 kg | Shahin Atamov (AZE) | Zabihollah Pourshab (IRI) | Enes Erkan (TUR) |

=== Women ===
| Event | Gold | Silver | Bronze |
|---|---|---|---|
| Kata | Sandy Scordo (FRA) | Yaiza Martin Abello (ESP) | Sakura Kokumai (USA) |
| Kumite 50 kg | Serap Özçelik (TUR) | Hong LI (CHN) | Alexandra Recchia (FRA) |
| Kumite 55 kg | Miki Kobayashi (JPN) | Yassmine Hamdy Byomy Attia (EGY) | Tuba Yenen (TUR) |
| Kumite 61 kg | Merillela Arreola Ferrreyra (MEX) | Kristina Mah (AUS) | Olga Stepanova (RUS) |
| Kumite 68 kg | Fatma Alzahraa Mahmoud (EGY) | Inga Sheroziia (RUS) | Cheryl Murphy (USA) |
| Kumite +68 kg | Maša Martinović (CRO) | Nadege Ait Ibrahim (FRA) | Faten Aissa (TUN) |
