= Karate at the 2022 Mediterranean Games – Women's 61 kg =

Women's kumite 61 kg at the 2022 Mediterranean Games
- Venue: Mohammed ben Ahmed CCO Hall 03 and 06
- Date: 26 June
- Competitors: 15 from 15 nations

Medalists
gold medal	Chaima Midi	Algeria
silver medal	Wafa Mahjoub	Tunisia
bronze medal	Nejra Sipović	Bosnia and Herzegovina
bronze medal	Alessandra Mangiacapra	Italy

The women's 61 kg competition in karate at the 2022 Mediterranean Games was held on 26 June at the Mohammed ben Ahmed CCO Hall 03 and 06 in Oran.

== Results ==
=== Bracket ===
Round of 16
Gülbahar Gözütok (TUR)	4
Maeva Dario (FRA)	4
Fatima-Zahra Chajai (MAR)	0
Salma El-Shafei (EGY)	0
Wafa Mahjoub (TUN)	1
Nejra Sipović (BIH)	0
Simona Zaborska (MKD)	3
Tamara Živković (SRB)	3
Chaima Midi (ALG)	1
Sandra Herver (AND)	0
Anthea Stylianou (CYP)	2
Adelina Rama (KOS)	0
Ana Lenard (CRO)	1
María Espinosa (ESP)	2

Quarterfinals
Maeva Dario (FRA)	5
Salma El-Shafei (EGY)	3
Wafa Mahjoub (TUN)	8
Tamara Živković (SRB)	2
Chaima Midi (ALG)	3
Anthea Stylianou (CYP)	0
María Espinosa (ESP)	0
Alessandra Mangiacapra (ITA)	1

Semifinals
Maeva Dario (FRA)	1
Wafa Mahjoub (TUN)	8
Chaima Midi (ALG)	2
Alessandra Mangiacapra (ITA)	0

Final
Wafa Mahjoub (TUN)	2
Chaima Midi (ALG)	3

=== Repechage ===
Repechage
Nejra Sipović (BIH)	4
Tamara Živković (SRB)	0

Bronze medal
Nejra Sipović (BIH)	2
Maeva Dario (FRA)	1

Repechage
Sandra Herver (AND)	2
Anthea Stylianou (CYP)	2

Bronze medal
Anthea Stylianou (CYP)	0
Alessandra Mangiacapra (ITA)	5
