= Karate at the 2017 World Games – Women's kumite 61 kg =

Women's Kumite 61kg at the 2017 World Games
- Venue: GEM Sports Complex
- Date: 26 July 2017
- Competitors: 6 from 6 nations

Medalists
1st place, gold medalist(s)		(Peru) Alexandra Grande
2nd place, silver medalist(s)		(Ukraine) Anita Serogina
3rd place, bronze medalist(s)		(Slovakia) Ingrida Suchánková

The women's kumite 61 kg competition in karate at the 2017 World Games took place on 26 July 2017 at the GEM Sports Complex in Wrocław, Poland.

== Results ==
=== Elimination round ===
==== Group A ====
Rank	Athlete	B	W	D	L	Pts	Score
1	Anita Serogina (UKR)	2	1	1	0	3	5–0
2	Alexandra Grande (PER)	2	1	1	0	3	2–0
3	Kristina Mah (AUS)	2	0	0	2	0	0–7

	Score	
Alexandra Grande (PER)	2–0	Kristina Mah (AUS)
Alexandra Grande (PER)	0–0	Anita Serogina (UKR)
Kristina Mah (AUS)	0–5	Anita Serogina (UKR)

==== Group B ====
Rank	Athlete	B	W	D	L	Pts	Score
1	Ingrida Suchánková (SVK)	2	1	0	1	2	7–5
2	Justyna Gradowska (POL)	2	1	0	1	2	6–5
3	Lucie Ignace (FRA)	2	1	0	1	2	2–5

	Score	
Justyna Gradowska (POL)	1–2	Lucie Ignace (FRA)
Justyna Gradowska (POL)	5–3	Ingrida Suchánková (SVK)
Lucie Ignace (FRA)	0–4	Ingrida Suchánková (SVK)

=== Finals ===
Semifinals
Anita Serogina (UKR)	2
Justyna Gradowska (POL)	0
Ingrida Suchánková (SVK)	3
Alexandra Grande (PER)	5

Final
Anita Serogina (UKR)	0
Alexandra Grande (PER)	2
Third place
Justyna Gradowska (POL)	0
Ingrida Suchánková (SVK)	2
