= 2022 European Karate Championships – Women's 61 kg =

European Karate Championship

Women's 61 kg at the 2022 European Karate Championships
- Venue: Karataş Şahinbey Sport Hall
- Location: Gaziantep, Turkey
- Dates: 25–28 May
- Competitors: 26 from 26 nations

Medalists
gold medal	Ingrida Suchánková	Slovakia
silver medal	Anna Miggou	Germany
bronze medal	Anita Serogina	Ukraine
bronze medal	Laura Sivert	France

The Women's 61 kg competition at the 2022 European Karate Championships was held from 25 to 28 May 2022.

== Results ==
=== Finals ===
Semifinals
(Slovakia) Ingrida Suchánková	6
(Ukraine) Anita Serogina	1
(France) Laura Sivert	0
(Germany) Anna Miggou	1

Final
(Slovakia) Ingrida Suchánková	2
(Germany) Anna Miggou	1

=== Repechage ===
Repechage 2
(Belgium) Nele De Vos	0
(Netherlands) Lynn Snel	1

Bronze medal
(Netherlands) Lynn Snel	0
(Ukraine) Anita Serogina	4

Repechage 1
(North Macedonia) Veronika Kostovska	6
(Cyprus) Anthea Stylianou	2

Repechage 2
(North Macedonia) Veronika Kostovska	3
(Finland) Kiia Koponen	0

Bronze medal
(North Macedonia) Veronika Kostovska	3
(France) Laura Sivert	6

=== Top half ===
==== Section 1 ====
Round of 32
(Greece) Maria Mastrogianni	1
(Portugal) Teresa Silva	6
(Poland) Weronika Mikulska	1
(Netherlands) Lynn Snel	8
(Sweden) Anna-Johanna Nilsson	1
(Belgium) Nele De Vos	4

Round of 16
(Portugal) Teresa Silva	1
(Netherlands) Lynn Snel	2
(Belgium) Nele De Vos	0
(Slovakia) Ingrida Suchánková	8

Quarterfinals
(Netherlands) Lynn Snel	0
(Slovakia) Ingrida Suchánková	4

==== Section 2 ====
Round of 32
(Italy) Alessandra Mangiacapra	3
(Hungary) Aleksandra Ilankovic	4
(Republic of Ireland) Ayla O'Sullivan	0
(Turkey) Merve Çoban	4

Round of 16
(Hungary) Aleksandra Ilankovic	6
(Azerbaijan) Ayla Rzazade	0
(Turkey) Merve Çoban	0
(Ukraine) Anita Serogina	1

Quarterfinals
(Hungary) Aleksandra Ilankovic	0
(Ukraine) Anita Serogina	6

=== Bottom half ===
==== Section 3 ====
Round of 32
(Spain) María Espinosa	1
(Kosovo) Adelina Rama	3
(Switzerland) Nina Radjenovic	0
(France) Laura Sivert	2
(Romania) Claudia Ionita	2
(Austria) Lejla Topalovic	3

Round of 16
(Kosovo) Adelina Rama	3
(France) Laura Sivert	3
(Austria) Lejla Topalovic	1
(Bosnia and Herzegovina) Marina Kurteš	4

Quarterfinals
(France) Laura Sivert	4
(Bosnia and Herzegovina) Marina Kurteš	0

==== Section 4 ====
Round of 32
(Finland) Kiia Koponen	3
(Croatia) Petra Nuić	2
(Germany) Anna Miggou	7
(North Macedonia) Veronika Kostovska	0

Round of 16
(Finland) Kiia Koponen	5
(Serbia) Tamara Živković	0
(Germany) Anna Miggou	5
(Cyprus) Anthea Stylianou	1

Quarterfinals
(Finland) Kiia Koponen	0
(Germany) Anna Miggou	2
