= Kulsoom Hazara =

Pakistani karateka (born 1988)

Personal information
- Born: September 4, 1988 (age 37) Quetta, Pakistan

Sport
- Sport: Karate
Medal record
Representing Pakistan
South Asian Karate Championships
Gold medal – first place	2017 Colombo	-68kg
Bronze medal – third place	2017 Colombo	Kumite (team)
South Asian Games
Gold medal – first place	2019 Kathmandu	Kumite (team)
Silver medal – second place	2019 Kathmandu	-68kg

Kulsoom Hazara (born 4 September 1988) is a Pakistani karateka.

== Background ==
Hazara is the youngest of four children: three sisters and one brother and belongs to the Hazara community of Quetta, Balochistan. She lost her mother to cancer at the age of two and her father to a heart attack at the age of 9. On her father's death, her eldest sister, Fatima and her cousin and brother-in-law, Sarwar Ali became her guardians. In 2000, due to the sectarian violence in her hometown, she shifted to Karachi. The loss of her brother-in-law in 2003, proved traumatic and changed her life. Kulsoom completed 13th South Asian Games in Kathmandu, Nepal, she won a gold and silver medal despite an injury, securing a place as a prominent karateka woman in South Asia.

== Career ==
Her father got her admitted to a karate club owned by Sarwar Ali, when she was five.

=== National ===
Hazara initially represented Pakistan Army before switching to WAPDA. She won her first national level gold medal in 2005.

Owing to her meritorious achievements, Hazara received 'Icon of the Nation' award in 2017.

YEAR	TITLE	VENUE	AWARD
2002	1st National Women Karate Championship	Lahore	1 Bronze Medal
2004	National Games	Quetta	1 Bronze Medal
2006	National Women Karate Championship	Rawalpindi	1 Silver Medal
2008	National Women Karate Championship	Lahore	2 Gold Medals
2009	National Women Karate Championship	Hyderabad	3 Gold Medals
2010	6th National Women Karate Championship	Karachi	3 Gold Medals
2010	31st National Games	Peshawar	3 Gold Medals
2012	Shaheed Benazir Bhutto 8th National Women Karate Championship	Lahore	3 Gold medals
2012	32nd National Games	Lahore	3 Gold Medals
2015	9th National Women Karate Championship	Lahore	2 Gold Medals
2016	10th National Women Karate Championship	Lahore	2 Gold Medals
2017	11th National Women Karate Championship	Lahore	2 Gold Medals
2018	12th National Women Karate Championship	Sahiwal	2 Gold Medals
2019	33rd National Games	Peshawar	2 Gold Medals
2019	13th National Women Karate Championship	Lahore	2 Gold Medals

=== International ===
She represented Pakistan for the first time at the 4th Islamic Women's Games held in Tehran, Iran in 2005. She came fifth.

In 2010, she won her first medals, two bronze at the South Asian Games held in Dhaka, Bangladesh.

In 2012, she was part of the first ever women's team sent to the Asian Championships, which were held in Tashkent, Uzbekistan.

At the 2016 South Asian Karate Championship held in New Delhi, India, she won two medals: a gold and a silver. In the 2017 Championship held in Colombo, Sri Lanka, she won another gold in -68 kg and a bronze in team kumite. In the -68 kg final she defended her title by defeating her opponent by 10 points to 2.

In 2018, she participated in the Asian Games held in Jakarta, Indonesia.

At the 2019 South Asian Games in Kathmandu, Nepal, Hazara won gold in the team kumite event and a silver in the -68 kg event.

=== Events ===
Hazara has participated in the following international events:

1. 4th Islamic Women Games 2005, Tehran, Iran
2. 10th South Asian Games 2006, Colombo, Sri Lanka
3. 11th South Asian Games 2010, Dhaka, Bangladesh
4. 11th Senior Cadet AKF (Asian) Championship 2012, Tashkent, Uzbekistan
5. 17th Asian Games 2014, Incheon, South Korea
6. 3rd South Asian Karate Championship 2016, New Delhi, India
7. 4th South Asian karate championship 2017, Colombo, Sri Lanka
8. 4th Islamic Solidarity Game 2017, Baku, Azerbaijan
9. Karate 1 Premier League 2017, Dubai, UAE
10. 15th AKF Senior Championship 2018, Amman, Jordan
11. 18th Asian Games 2018, Jakarta, Indonesia
12. Karate 1 Series A 2018, Shanghai, China
13. 13th South Asian Games 2019, Kathmandu, Nepal

== Film ==
In 2018, Sharmeen Obaid-Chinoy made a short film about her titled, "Kulsoom Hazara - The Karate Wonder"
