= Noursin Aly =

Egyptian karateka (born 2002)

Personal information
- Born: 12 January 2002 (age 24)

Sport
- Country: Egypt
- Sport: Karate
- Weight class: 61 kg
- Event: Kumite
Medal record
Women's karate
Representing Egypt
World Games
Bronze medal – third place	2025 Chengdu	Kumite 61 kg
World Championships
Bronze medal – third place	2023 Budapest	Kumite 61 kg
African Games
Gold medal – first place	2023 Accra	Kumite 61 kg
Gold medal – first place	2023 Accra	Team kumite

Noursin Aly (born 12 January 2002) is an Egyptian karateka who specializes in kumite. She has won medals for her country at the African Games, World Games and World Karate Championships.

== Career ==
In 2021, Aly competed in the women's 61 kg event at the World Karate Championships held in Dubai, United Arab Emirates. She also competed in the women's 61 kg event at the 2023 World Karate Championships held in Budapest, Hungary, where she won a bronze medal.

In 2024, Aly won the gold medal in the 61 kg and team kumite events at the 2023 African Games held in Accra, Ghana. She won the bronze medal in the women's kumite 61 kg event at the 2025 World Games held in Chengdu, China. She defeated Atousa Golshadnejad of Iran in the bronze medal match.
