= Sarah Nasir =

Pakistani karateka

Sarah Nasir is a female, Pakistani karateka who on February 7, 2010 won a gold medal in the 2010 South Asian Games. She was named sports ambassador for Pakistan by the country's president.
