= Ingrida Suchánková =

Slovak karateka (born 1993)

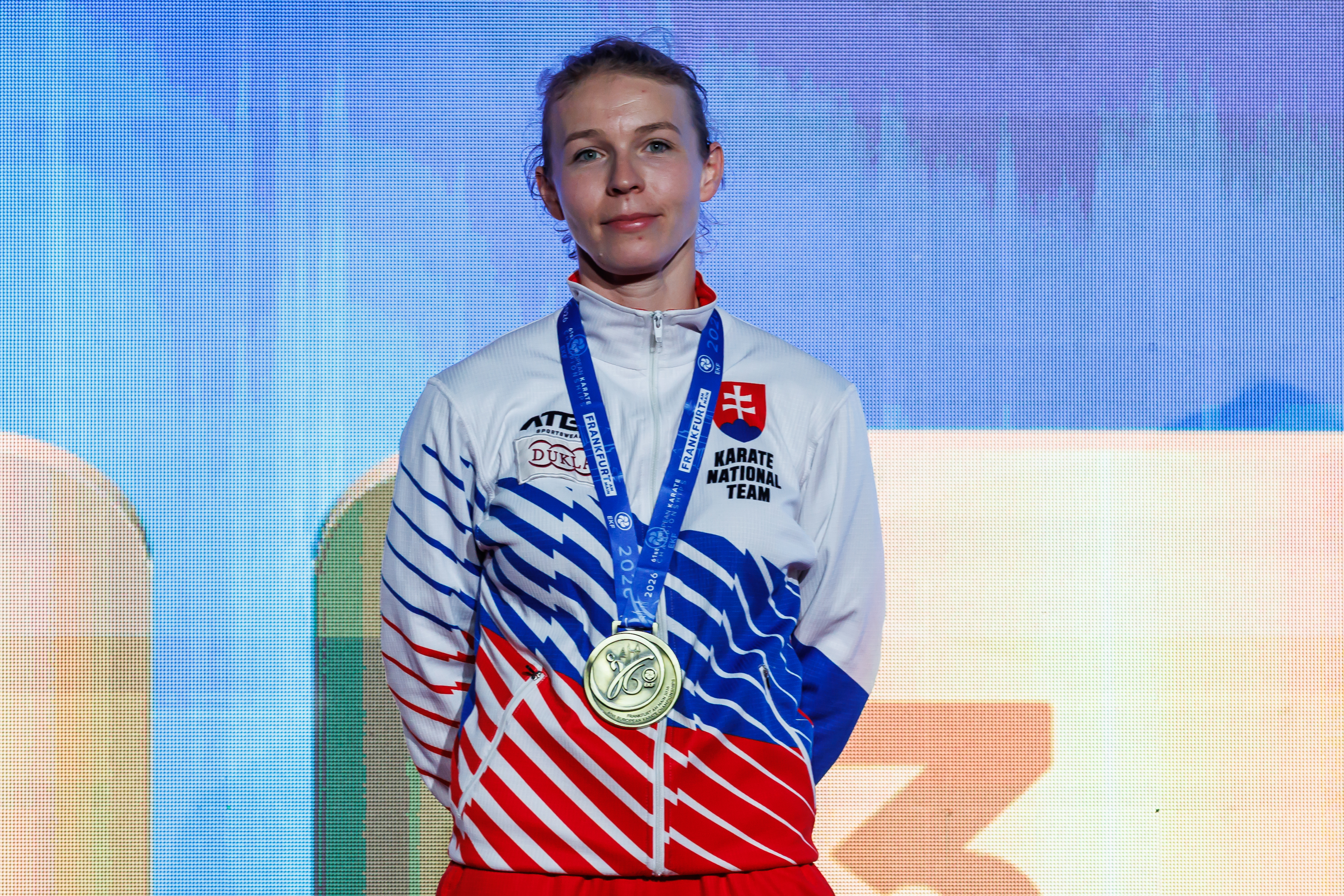

Personal information
- Born: 8 February 1993 (age 33)

Sport
- Country: Slovakia
- Sport: Karate
- Weight class: 61 kg
- Events: Kumite; Team kumite
Medal record
Women's karate
Representing Slovakia
World Championships
Bronze medal – third place	2016 Linz	Kumite 61 kg
World Games
Bronze medal – third place	2017 Wrocław	Kumite 61 kg
Bronze medal – third place	2022 Birmingham	Kumite 61 kg
European Championships
Gold medal – first place	2022 Gaziantep	Kumite 61 kg
Gold medal – first place	2024 Zadar	Kumite 61 kg
Silver medal – second place	2022 Gaziantep	Team kumite
Bronze medal – third place	2015 Istanbul	Kumite 61 kg
Bronze medal – third place	2017 İzmit	Team kumite
Bronze medal – third place	2019 Guadalajara	Kumite 61 kg
Bronze medal – third place	2021 Poreč	Kumite 61 kg
Bronze medal – third place	2026 Frankfurt	Kumite 61 kg

Ingrida Suchánková (born 8 February 1993) is a Slovak karateka. At the 2016 World Karate Championships held in Linz, Austria, she won one of the bronze medals in the women's kumite 61 kg event. She is also a two-time gold medalist and four-time bronze medalist in this event at the European Karate Championships.

== Career ==
In 2015, Suchánková represented Slovakia at the European Games held in Baku, Azerbaijan. She competed in the women's kumite 61 kg event without winning a medal. In the elimination round, she lost one match and two other matches ended in a draw and as a result, she did not advance to compete in the semi-finals.

At the 2017 World Games held in Wrocław, Poland, Suchánková won the bronze medal in the women's kumite 61 kg event. In her bronze medal match she defeated Justyna Gradowska of Poland.

In June 2021, Suchánková competed at the World Olympic Qualification Tournament held in Paris, France hoping to qualify for the 2020 Summer Olympics in Tokyo, Japan. In November 2021, she lost her bronze medal match in the women's 61 kg event at the World Karate Championships held in Dubai, United Arab Emirates.

Suchánková won the bronze medal in the women's 61 kg event at the 2022 World Games held in Birmingham, United States. She won the gold medal in the women's 61 kg event at the 2024 European Karate Championships held in Zadar, Croatia.

== Achievements ==
Year	Competition	Venue	Rank	Event
2015	European Championships	Istanbul, Turkey	3rd	Kumite 61 kg
2016	World Championships	Linz, Austria	3rd	Kumite 61 kg
2017	European Championships	İzmit, Turkey	3rd	Team kumite
2017	World Games	Wrocław, Poland	3rd	Kumite 61 kg
2019	European Championships	Guadalajara, Spain	3rd	Kumite 61 kg
2021	European Championships	Poreč, Croatia	3rd	Kumite 61 kg
2022	European Championships	Gaziantep, Turkey	1st	Kumite 61 kg
2022	European Championships	Gaziantep, Turkey	2nd	Team kumite
2022	World Games	Birmingham, United States	3rd	Kumite 61 kg
2024	European Championships	Zadar, Croatia	1st	Kumite 61 kg
2026	European Championships	Frankfurt, Germany	3rd	Kumite 61 kg
