= Peru at the 2017 World Games =

Peru at the World Games 2017
- IOC code: PER
- NOC: Comité Olímpico Peruano

in Wrocław, Poland 20 July 2017 – 30 July 2017
- Competitors: 1 in 1 sport
- Medals: Gold 1 Silver 0 Bronze 1 Total 2

World Games appearances
- 1981; 1985; 1989; 1993; 1997; 2001; 2005; 2009; 2013; 2017; 2022; 2025

Peru competed at the World Games 2017 in Wrocław, Poland, from 20 July 2017 to 30 July 2017.

== Competitors ==
Sports	Men	Women	Total	Events
Muaythai	0	1	1	1
Total	0	1	1	1

== Karate ==
Alexandra Grande won the gold medal in the women's kumite 61 kg event.

== Muaythai ==
Peru has qualified at the 2017 World Games:

- Women's -60kg - 1 quota (Valentina Shevchenko)
