= Karate at the 2019 South Asian Games =

South Asian Games in 2019

Karate at the 2019
- Venue: International Sports Complex, Satdobato
- Dates: 2–4 December 2019

Karate at the 2019 South Asian Games was hosted at the International Sports Complex, Satdobato, in Lalitpur, Nepal from 2 to 4 December 2019.

== Medal table ==
* Host nation (Nepal)

Rank	Nation	Gold	Silver	Bronze	Total
1	Nepal (NEP)*	10	4	5	19
2	Pakistan (PAK)	6	9	4	19
3	Bangladesh (BAN)	3	3	13	19
4	Sri Lanka (SRI)	0	3	15	18
5	Bhutan (BHU)	0	0	1	1
Totals (5 entries)		19	19	38	76

== Medalists ==
=== Kata ===
Event	Gold	Silver	Bronze
Men's individual	Mande Kaji Shrestha; Nepal	Niamatullah; Pakistan	Sounthararasa Balura; Sri Lanka
Men's individual	Mande Kaji Shrestha; Nepal	Niamatullah; Pakistan	Mohammad Hassan Khan; Bangladesh
Women's individual	Shaida; Pakistan	Chanchala Danuwar; Nepal	HeShanee Hettiarrachchi; Sri Lanka
Women's individual	Shaida; Pakistan	Chanchala Danuwar; Nepal	Humaira Akhter Antara; Bangladesh
Men's team	Nepal; Mande Kaji Shrestha; Mahasus Moktan; Prabin Manandha	Sri Lanka; Adikari Mudiyanselage; Thalamadille Gedara; Waranakulasuriya	Bangladesh; Md Arif; Md Saheed; Monowur Hossain
Men's team	Nepal; Mande Kaji Shrestha; Mahasus Moktan; Prabin Manandha	Sri Lanka; Adikari Mudiyanselage; Thalamadille Gedara; Waranakulasuriya	Pakistan; Naseer Ahmed; Noman Ahmed; Niamatullah
Women's team	Nepal; Nirmala Tamang; Saru Karki; Sangita Magar	Pakistan; Nargis; Shaida; Nazish Gul	Sri Lanka; Hewage; Jayakody Arachchige Dona; Pahalawattegedara
Women's team	Nepal; Nirmala Tamang; Saru Karki; Sangita Magar	Pakistan; Nargis; Shaida; Nazish Gul	Bangladesh; Karima; Nu May; Hla

=== Kumite ===
==== Men ====
Event	Gold	Silver	Bronze
50 kg	Noman Ahmed; Pakistan	Thalpawila Kankanamge; Sri Lanka	Mohammad Sobaz Miah; Bangladesh
50 kg	Noman Ahmed; Pakistan	Thalpawila Kankanamge; Sri Lanka	Sonam Lama; Nepal
55 kg	Laxman Tamang; Nepal	Muhammad Mostafa Kamal; Bangladesh	Kasmiyar Rosairo; Sri Lanka
55 kg	Laxman Tamang; Nepal	Muhammad Mostafa Kamal; Bangladesh	Murad Khan; Pakistan
60 kg	Md Alamin Salim; Bangladesh	Zafar Iqbal; Pakistan	Rajiv Pudasaini; Nepal
60 kg	Md Alamin Salim; Bangladesh	Zafar Iqbal; Pakistan	Weerakoon Muda; Sri Lanka
67 kg	Nabin Rasaili; Nepal	Naseer Ahmed; Pakistan	Fransisku Hettige Silva; Sri Lanka
67 kg	Nabin Rasaili; Nepal	Naseer Ahmed; Pakistan	Mohammad Ferdous; Bangladesh
75 kg	Saadi Abbas Jalbani; Pakistan	Gangaram Kushwar; Nepal	Sherab Wangchuk; Bhutan
75 kg	Saadi Abbas Jalbani; Pakistan	Gangaram Kushwar; Nepal	Bandarigodage Kasun Dhanushka; Sri Lanka
84 kg	Muhammad Awais; Pakistan	Diwas Shrestha; Nepal	Mohammad Ramzan; Bangladesh
84 kg	Muhammad Awais; Pakistan	Diwas Shrestha; Nepal	Archinge Kabindu; Sri Lanka
+84 kg	Biplav Lal Shrestha; Nepal	Baz Muhammad; Pakistan	Maggona Gamaralage Sumeda; Sri Lanka
+84 kg	Biplav Lal Shrestha; Nepal	Baz Muhammad; Pakistan	Atiqur Rahman; Bangladesh
Team	Pakistan; Saadi Abbas Jalbani; Naseer Ahmed; Rehmatullah; Shahbaz Khan; Baz Muhammad; Muhammad Awais; Murad Khan	Sri Lanka; Jayakoshi; Bandarigodage Kasun Dhanushka; Mendia; Sanberowan; Priyabershana; Bandara; Thureshinghe	Nepal; Mukundra Maharjan; Rajkumar Rasaili; Sushil Poudel; Arjun Bagchan; Lekhnath Mainali; Binod Shakya; Digamber Pant
Team	Pakistan; Saadi Abbas Jalbani; Naseer Ahmed; Rehmatullah; Shahbaz Khan; Baz Muhammad; Muhammad Awais; Murad Khan	Sri Lanka; Jayakoshi; Bandarigodage Kasun Dhanushka; Mendia; Sanberowan; Priyabershana; Bandara; Thureshinghe	Bangladesh; Mohammad Allamin; Mohammad Ramzan; Mohammad Afiurreham; Mohammad Hafizur Rehaman; Lokman Hossain; Hassan Khan; Mohammad Ferdous

==== Women ====
Event	Gold	Silver	Bronze
45 kg	Kusum Khadka; Nepal	Mounjera Borna; Bangladesh	Senarath Archaige Iskha; Sri Lanka
45 kg	Kusum Khadka; Nepal	Mounjera Borna; Bangladesh	Iqra Anwar; Pakistan
50 kg	Anu Adhikari; Nepal	Don Pawaulu Badalge Dinusha Kumari; Sri Lanka	Sabira Gul; Pakistan
50 kg	Anu Adhikari; Nepal	Don Pawaulu Badalge Dinusha Kumari; Sri Lanka	Famida Akter; Bangladesh
55 kg	Marzan Akter Priya; Bangladesh	Sana Kousar; Pakistan	Mukadam Wasam Thapa Samanmali; Sri Lanka
55 kg	Marzan Akter Priya; Bangladesh	Sana Kousar; Pakistan	Manisha Chaudhary; Nepal
61 kg	Humaira Akhter Antara; Bangladesh	Anu Gurung; Nepal	Naz Gull; Pakistan
61 kg	Humaira Akhter Antara; Bangladesh	Anu Gurung; Nepal	Jayakody Arachchige Buddika; Sri Lanka
68 kg	Sunita Maharjan; Nepal	Kulsoom; Pakistan	Moreom Khatun; Bangladesh
68 kg	Sunita Maharjan; Nepal	Kulsoom; Pakistan	Wijesoorya Arachige Sarani; Sri Lanka
+68 kg	Anupama Magar; Nepal	Nargis Hameedullah; Pakistan	Abida Sultana Ava; Bangladesh
+68 kg	Anupama Magar; Nepal	Nargis Hameedullah; Pakistan	Kulathunga Bijeyioon; Sri Lanka
Team	Pakistan; Kulsoom; Sana Kousar; Nargis Hameedullah; Sabira Gul	Bangladesh; Sifa; Marzan Akter Priya; Mounjera Borna; Nouma	Sri Lanka; Samanmali; Bandara; Aruni; Anjanli
Team	Pakistan; Kulsoom; Sana Kousar; Nargis Hameedullah; Sabira Gul	Bangladesh; Sifa; Marzan Akter Priya; Mounjera Borna; Nouma	Nepal; Sani Tamang; Aster Rai; Rita Karki; Susmita Tamang
