= Assel Kanay =

Kazakhstani karateka (born 2001)

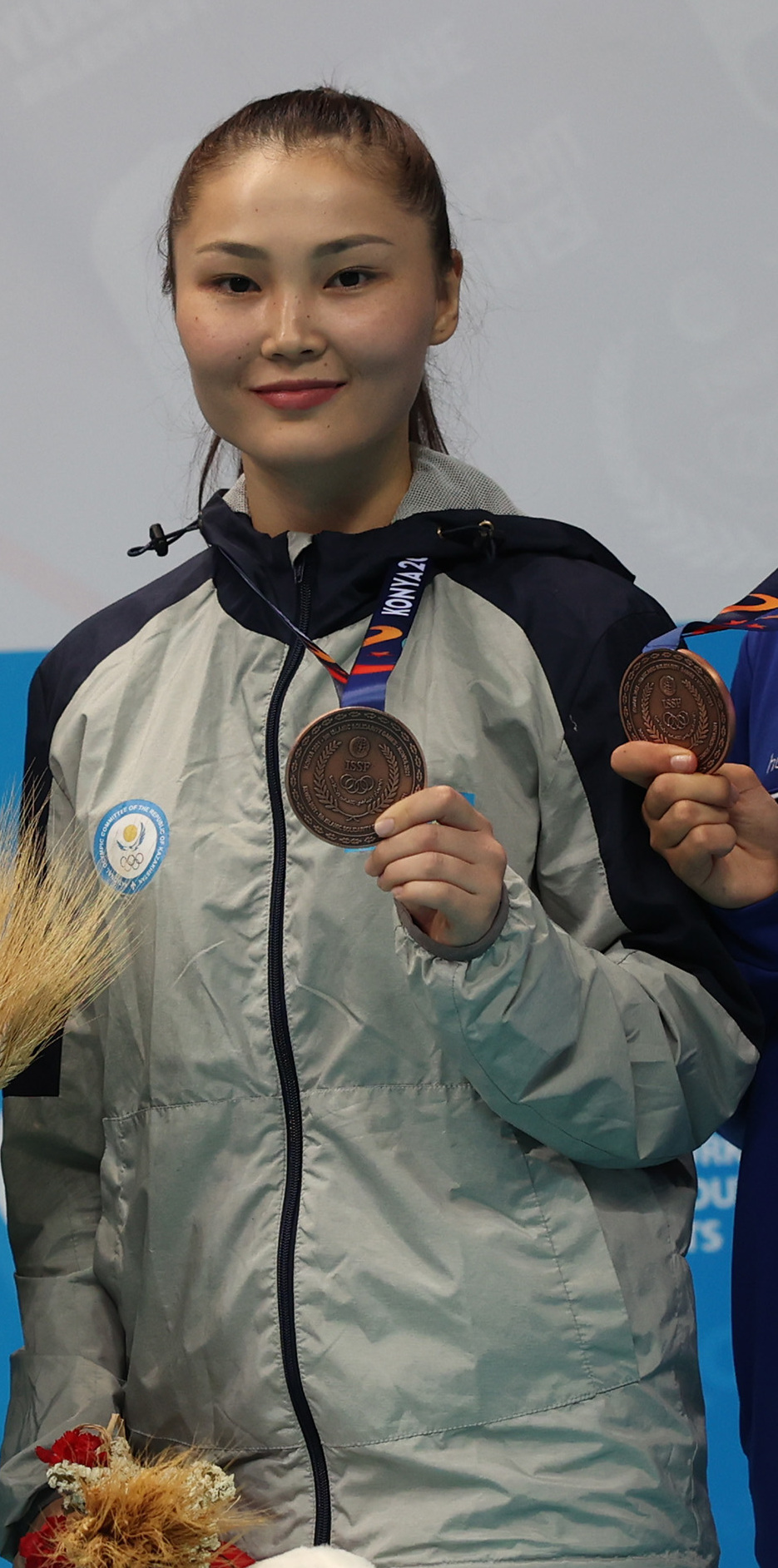
- Kanay at the 2021 Islamic Solidarity Games in Konya, Turkey

Personal information
- Nationality: Kazakhstan
- Born: 25 May 2001 (age 25) Shymkent, Kazakhstan
- Height: 1.68 m (5 ft 6 in)

Sport
- Country: Kazakhstan
- Sport: Karate
- Weight class: 61 kg; 68 kg
- Events: Kumite; Team kumite
Medal record
Women's karate
Representing Kazakhstan
World Championships
Bronze medal – third place	2025 Cairo	Kumite 61 kg
Asian Games
Silver medal – second place	2026 Aichi-Nagoya	Kumite 61 kg
Bronze medal – third place	2022 Hangzhou	Kumite 61 kg
Islamic Solidarity Games
Bronze medal – third place	2021 Konya	Kumite 61 kg
Asian Championships
Gold medal – first place	2022 Tashkent	Kumite 61 kg
Gold medal – first place	2022 Tashkent	Team kumite
Silver medal – second place	2025 Tashkent	Team kumite
Silver medal – second place	2026 Bali	Kumite 61 kg
Bronze medal – third place	2021 Almaty	Kumite 68 kg
Bronze medal – third place	2025 Tashkent	Kumite 61 kg

Assel Kanay (Kazakh: Әсел Талғатқызы Қанай; born 25 May 2001) is a Kazakhstani karateka. She won one of the bronze medals in the women's 61 kg event at the 2021 Islamic Solidarity Games held in Konya, Turkey and at the 2022 Asian Games held in Hangzhou, China. She is also a gold medalist in her event at the 2022 Asian Karate Championships held in Tashkent, Uzbekistan.

== Career ==
In November 2021, Kanay competed in the women's 68 kg event at the World Karate Championships held in Dubai, United Arab Emirates where she was eliminated in her third match by Alizée Agier of France. Agier went on to win one of the bronze medals in the event. A month later, Kanay won one of the bronze medals in her event at the 2021 Asian Karate Championships held in Almaty, Kazakhstan.

Kanay won one of the bronze medals in the women's 61 kg event at the 2021 Islamic Solidarity Games held in Konya, Turkey. She won two gold medals at the 2022 Asian Karate Championships held in Tashkent, Uzbekistan. She defeated Kymbat Toitonova of Kyrgyzstan in the gold medal match of the women's 61 kg event.

In 2023, Kanay won one of the bronze medals in the women's 61 kg event at the 2022 Asian Games held in Hangzhou, China. She defeated Atousa Golshadnezhad of Iran in her bronze medal match. She competed in the women's 61 kg event at the 2023 World Karate Championships held in Budapest, Hungary where she was eliminated in her second match.

== Achievements ==
Year	Competition	Venue	Rank	Event
2021	Asian Championships	Almaty, Kazakhstan	3rd	Kumite 68 kg
2022	Islamic Solidarity Games	Konya, Turkey	3rd	Kumite 61 kg
2022	Asian Championships	Tashkent, Uzbekistan	1st	Kumite 61 kg
2022	Asian Championships	Tashkent, Uzbekistan	1st	Team kumite
2023	Asian Games	Hangzhou, China	3rd	Kumite 61 kg
2025	Asian Championships	Tashkent, Uzbekistan	3rd	Kumite 61 kg
2025	Asian Championships	Tashkent, Uzbekistan	2nd	Team kumite
2026	Asian Championships	Bali, Indonesia	2nd	Kumite 61 kg
2026	Asian Games	Aichi and Nagoya, Japan	2nd	Kumite 61 kg
