= Wafa Mahjoub =

Tunisian karateka

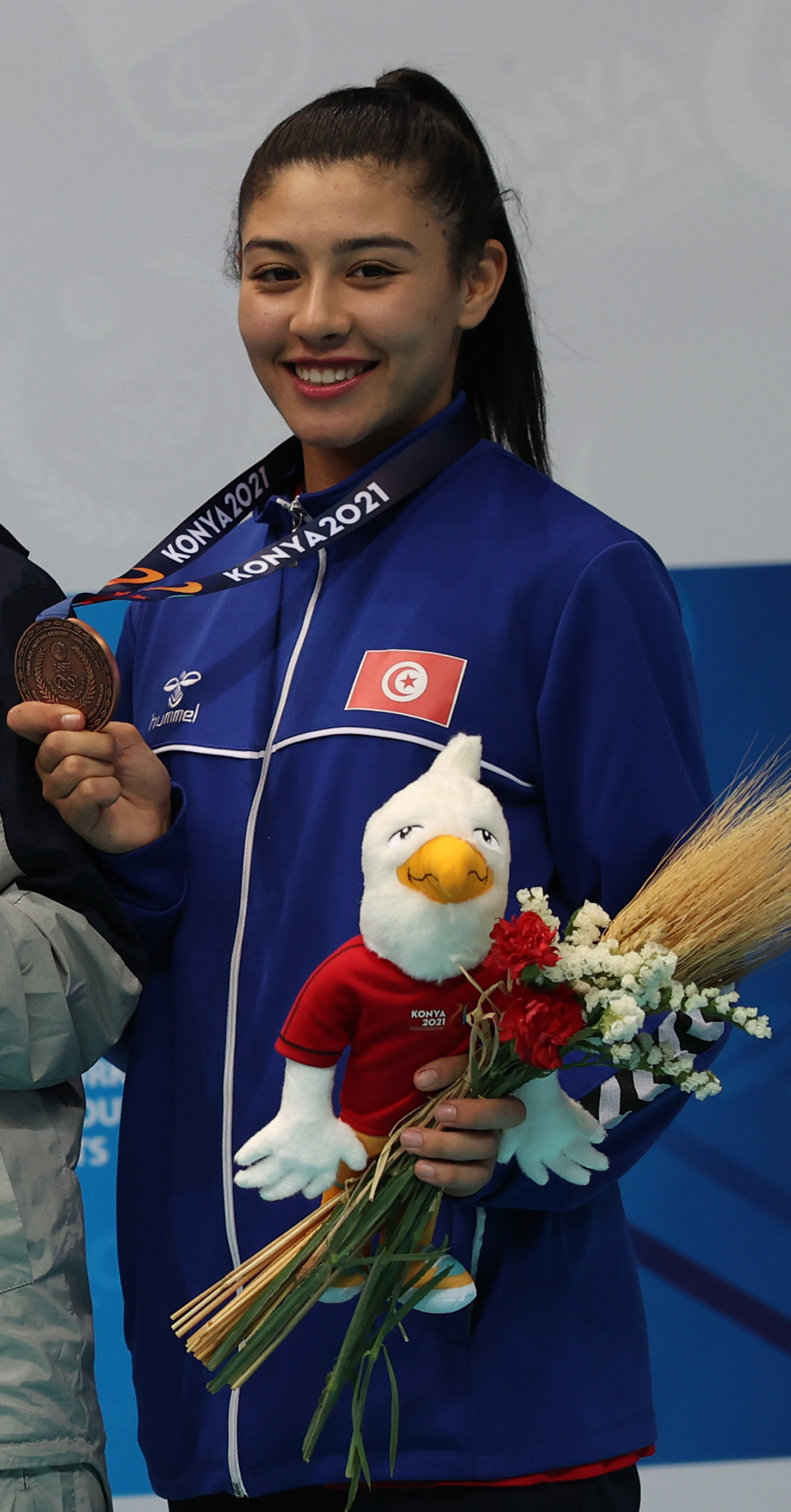

Sport
- Country: Tunisia
- Sport: Karate
- Weight class: 61 kg
- Event: Kumite
Medal record
Women's karate
Representing Tunisia
World Championships
Bronze medal – third place	2025 Cairo	Kumite 61 kg
African Games
Silver medal – second place	2023 Accra	Kumite 61 kg
Islamic Solidarity Games
Silver medal – second place	2025 Riyadh	Kumite 61 kg
Bronze medal – third place	2021 Konya	Kumite 61 kg
Mediterranean Games
Silver medal – second place	2022 Oran	Kumite 61 kg
Arab Games
Gold medal – first place	2023 Algiers	Kumite 61 kg

Wafa Mahjoub is a Tunisian karateka. She won the silver medal in the women's 61 kg event at the 2022 Mediterranean Games held in Oran, Algeria. She won one of the bronze medals in the women's 61 kg event at the 2021 Islamic Solidarity Games held in Konya, Turkey.

In 2021, she competed in the women's 61 kg event at the World Karate Championships held in Dubai, United Arab Emirates. She also competed in the women's 61 kg event at the 2023 World Karate Championships held in Budapest, Hungary.

In 2024, she won the silver medal in her event at the 2023 African Games held in Accra, Ghana.

== Achievements ==
Year	Competition	Venue	Rank	Event
2022	Mediterranean Games	Oran, Algeria	2nd	Kumite 61 kg
2022	Islamic Solidarity Games	Konya, Turkey	3rd	Kumite 61 kg
2023	Arab Games	Algiers, Algeria	1st	Kumite 61 kg
2024	African Games	Accra, Ghana	2nd	Kumite 61 kg
