= Fatma Naz Yenen =

Turkish karateka (born 2001)

- Born: 29 August 2001 (age 25); Kocaeli, Turkey
- Nationality: Turkish
- Height: 1.70 m (5 ft 7 in)
- Weight: 56 kg (123 lb)
- Style: Karate Kumite
- Team: Kocaeli Kağıt

Fatma Naz Yenen (born 29 August 2001) is a Turkish karateka competing in the kumite. She is sister of Tuba Yakan.

== Career ==
Fatma Naz Yenen won the silver medal in the women's 61 kg event at the 2023 World Karate Championships held in Budapest, Hungary.

She won one of the bronze medals in the women's 61 kg event at the 2024 European Karate Championships held in Zadar, Croatia.
