= Atousa Golshadnejad =

Iranian karateka (born 2003)

Personal information
- Born: June 22, 2003 (age 23) Kermanshah

Sport
- Country: Iran
- Sport: Karate
- Event: Kumite
- Coached by: Pegah Zangeneh
Medal record
Women's karate
Representing Iran
World Championships
Gold medal – first place	2025 Cairo	61 kg
Asian Championships
Gold medal – first place	2023 Malacca	61 kg
Gold medal – first place	2025 Tashkent	61 kg
Silver medal – second place	2023 Malacca	Team
Bronze medal – third place	2024 Hangzhou	61 kg
Bronze medal – third place	2025 Tashkent	Team
Islamic Solidarity Games
Gold medal – first place	2025 Riyadh	61 kg

Atousa Golshadnejad (born June 22, 2003) is an Iranian karate practitioner born in Kermanshah, Iran. Golshadenjad is a member of the Iranian national team in the age group of under 21 and adults. She won the gold medal in the 2021 Asian Championship in Almaty under the age of 21 and the 2023 Asian Championship in Malacca.

== Early life ==
Golshadnejad started karate in 2010 under the supervision of her trainer, Frank Nazari, at the Arad club in Kermanshah. Currently, she is the national champion of the women's karate team of the Islamic Republic of Iran, weighing under 61 kg.

== Career ==
=== 2021 Asian Championship ===
Atousa Golshadnejad appeared in her first international experience in the under-21-61 kg category at the 2021 Asian Championships in Almaty, Kazakhstan. In the first round, she defeated Limon Miso from the Philippines with a score of 1:0. In the second round, she defeated Hei Wood Chou from Hong Kong with a score of 4:0 and went to the finals. In the final match, Golshadenjad defeated Asal Kenny from Kazakhstan with a result of 4:3 and won the gold medal of this competition.

=== 2022 World Championship ===
Atousa Golshadnejad, representative of the 61-kg weight category under the age of 21 at the 2022 World Championship in Konya, Turkey, after taking a break in the first round, beat Lee Bouchard of Switzerland 8-0 and went to the next stage. In the third round, she won 7–2 against Shafaq Qoutabi from Italy and went to the next round. She defeated Sait Karari from Japan 3–1 in the fourth round. Gulshadanejad lost 4–3 to Gülbahar Gözütok in the semi-final and got another chance for the bronze medal. In the first round, she lost 3–0 to Hilary Jennifer Zamto from France and withdrew from the competition.

=== 2023 Asian Championship ===
In the first round, Golshadnejad beat Mona Al-Diri from Jordan with a score of 2–0, and in the second round, she managed to defeat Asel Kanaya from Kazakhstan with a score of 1–0. The platform of the 2023 Asian Championship 61- Iran women's weight representative in her third match against Gong Li from China, while the result of this competition was 0-0, she won with the judges' vote and Golshadnejad's Hanti and went to the finals of this competition, and in the final competition with the result of 3 Bar Safar defeated the Emirati opponent and became the owner of the 1st gold medal of the Asian Karate Championship.
